= 2026 Lebanon war =

Ongoing conflict in the Middle East

- Part of the Hezbollah–Israel conflict and the 2026 Iran war
- Israel Lebanon Israeli-occupied Lebanese territory Syria Israeli-occupied Golan Heights Other Israeli-occupied Syrian territory Litani River; Yellow Line (For an up-to-date, interactive, detailed map of the current military situation, see here.)
| Date | 2 March 2026 – present (8 months, 1 week and 1 day) |
| Location | Lebanon and Israel |
| Status | De jure temporary ceasefire since 16 April 2026 with continued Israeli airstrikes |
| Territorial changes | Israel occupies parts of Southern Lebanon |

Belligerents
| Hezbollah; Amal Movement (Note: The Amal Movement has played an active role in hostilities. Paramedics belonging to the Amal Movement's Islamic Risala Scout Association have been targeted in Israeli airstrikes.); (Popular Front for the Liberation of Palestine) PFLP (Note: Three PFLP fighters were reported killed while participating in battles in southern Lebanon.); SSNP-L volunteers (Note: The party has permitted its members to fight Israel in Southern Lebanon on their own accord.); Attacked by Israel: Palestinian Islamic Jihad; Hamas; Islamic Group of Lebanon; Iran; Islamic Revolutionary Guard Corps; Quds Force | Israel | Lebanon (Note: Lebanese soldiers have been killed in Israeli drone attacks. The Lebanese army arrested armed Hezbollah members.) (United Nations) UNIFIL (Note: UNIFIL peacekeepers have been attacked by the IDF, and have engaged in a clash with Hezbollah.) Attacked by Hezbollah and Israel: Syria (Note: Syria declared its support for the disarmament of Hezbollah following the outbreak of the war. In response, Hezbollah struck Syrian army positions near Damascus. Syrian authorities began closing smuggling routes used by Hezbollah along the Lebanese border. For further information, see Syria in the 2026 Iran war.) |

Commanders and leaders
| Naim Qassem; Muhammad Haydar; Talal Hamiyah; Ali Musa Daqduq X Hajj Yusuf Ismail Hashem X Ali Reda Abbas X Ahmed Ghaleb Balout X (Islamic Revolutionary Guard Corps) Ali Zadeh X (Islamic Revolutionary Guard Corps) Reza Khazaei X (Palestinian Islamic Jihad) Adham Adnan al-Othman X (Hamas) Ahmad Abdullah X | Benjamin Netanyahu; Israel Katz; Eyal Zamir; (Israel) Rafi Milo | (Lebanon) Joseph Aoun (Lebanon) Nawaf Salam (United Nations) Diodato Abagnara |

Units involved
- See order of battle

Casualties and losses
| (Hezbollah) 1,000+ fighters killed (per independent estimates); (Hezbollah) 2,500 fighters killed and 10,000 injured (per Israel) (Hezbollah) 5 fighters captured (per Israel); 6 paramedics killed; 3 members killed; (Islamic Revolutionary Guard Corps) 6 officers killed | (Israel) 41 soldiers and 1 demolition worker killed (Note: Forty-one on-duty IDF soldiers killed since 2 March 2026, including one by friendly fire. This figure excludes one soldier killed in a shooting in Tzur Natan (central Israel) and two killed in the West Bank (officially Judea and Samaria). It also excludes one off-duty soldier killed in Hezbollah shelling of Israel, who is counted as a civilian casualty. One civilian (a demolition worker) was killed in Lebanon while working for the IDF.) (Israel) 1,468 soldiers wounded (Note: Total wounded during Operation Roaring Lion.) | (Lebanon) 27+ soldiers killed, and 6 injured 4 Civil Defense members killed, and 11 injured 1 Republican Guard member arrested (United Nations) 7 peacekeepers killed, (Note: Consisting of four Indonesians, two French, and one Serbian peacekeepers.) and 21 injured (Note: Consisting of seven Indonesians, four Ghanaians, three French, two Spanish, two Malaysian, and one each from El Salvadorian, Nepali, and Polish peacekeepers.) |
- 4,362 killed, 12,378 injured, and 1.2 million+ displaced in Lebanon; 3 civilians killed in Israel (including 1 by friendly fire) (Note: Three civilians killed in Israel; this figure includes one civilian killed by friendly fire and 1 off-duty soldier. It does not include one civilian killed in an accident during a Hezbollah rocket attack and one civilian who died from a heart attack during Hezbollah and Iranian missile or rocket attacks.); 190 Syrian civilians killed by Israel

Since 2 March 2026, there has been an ongoing war in Lebanon between Israel and the militant group Hezbollah, with Israel invading parts of Lebanon. It is a resumption of major fighting in the Hezbollah–Israel conflict, and part of the wider conflict in the Middle East. The war has precipitated a humanitarian crisis, resulted in the deaths of more than 4,000 people from Israeli strikes in Lebanon, and seen the forced displacement of over 1 million.

Hezbollah attacked Israel on 8 October 2023, one day after Hamas' October 7 attacks at the start of the Gaza war, which led to the 2024 Israeli invasion of Lebanon. After an Israel-Lebanon ceasefire agreement in November 2024, Israel still conducted airstrikes, saying that Hezbollah breached ceasefire conditions. Hezbollah launched strikes on Israel on 2 March 2026, in response to Israel and the United States launching a war against Iran, Hezbollah's main backer, and assassinating its supreme leader. Israel resumed airstrikes across Lebanon on a larger scale and, on 16 March, began ground operations in southern Lebanon. The main bridges on the Litani River were blown up by Israel to cut off the south from the rest of Lebanon; Bint Jbeil became a site of intense ground combat. Israel announced it would demolish Lebanese border villages and occupy Lebanon up to the Litani. Lebanon moved to ban Hezbollah's military activities; it also condemned Israeli attacks on Lebanese civilians. Iran called for an end to Israeli attacks in Lebanon as a condition for a ceasefire in the wider war.

After a ceasefire halted the Iran war, Hezbollah halted its attacks. Israeli Prime Minister Benjamin Netanyahu said the ceasefire did not apply to Lebanon, contradicting Iran and the Pakistani mediator, and launched the largest airstrikes of the war. On 16 April, Israel and Lebanon agreed to a 10-day ceasefire, later extended more than once. On 3 June, Israel and Lebanon reached an agreement, facilitated by the US. On 4 June, Hezbollah rejected the Lebanon-Israel deal and demanded a full ceasefire and a full Israeli withdrawal from Lebanon. Speaker of Lebanese Parliament Nabih Berri suggested that Hezbollah and Israel both withdraw from south of the Litani.

On 15 June, the Islamabad Memorandum was agreed between the US and Iran, including a ceasefire in Lebanon. Israeli forces remained in occupied areas of Lebanon. On 19 June, U.S. President Donald Trump announced an Israel-Hezbollah truce entering into force at 4 p.m. local time (1 p.m. GMT). On 26 June, US secretary of state Marco Rubio announced a framework deal between Israel and Lebanon for "lasting peace and security". The agreement includes full disarmament of Hezbollah; it was rejected by Hezbollah. On 30 June, Iran announced that it, along with the US and Lebanon, has reached an agreement to establish a committee to oversee the conclusion of the war. On 15 July, the US State Department reported that Israel has agreed to withdraw from pilot zones in southern Lebanon. On 20 July, the US announced that Israel handed over sections of the buffer zone occupied by it in southern Lebanon to the Lebanese government as per its U.S.-mediated deal with Beirut. Lebanon's army began deploying in Zawtar al-Gharbiyeh on 21 July, after an Israeli withdrawal in line with the agreement.

== Background ==
In the aftermath of the outbreak of the Gaza war in October 2023, Israel and the Lebanese Shia militia Hezbollah have been engaged in conflict, as part of a longer stretch of hostilities between the two since the latter's founding in 1982. Hezbollah launched strikes against Israel after the 7 October 2023 attacks, which it said was in solidarity with the Palestinians. After a year of fighting, Israel invaded southern Lebanon in October 2024, pulling out after the US brokered an agreement between Israel and Lebanon at the end of November, but not before killing Hezbollah's militant leader, cleric Hassan Nasrallah. Between November 2024 and March 2026, however, several ceasefire violations occurred between the two, with Israel launching near-daily attacks killing 331 people (of which at least 127 were civilians) by November 2025; later, the total death toll reached 500; Israel said these actions were an attempt to enforce the ceasefire terms and prevent Hezbollah's renewed military buildup. Hezbollah violated the ceasefire terms by rebuilding its militant infrastructure and weapons arsenal.

UNIFIL, a UN peacekeeping mission present in southern Lebanon for decades, was terminated in September 2025 by the UN Security Council (amid pressure from Israel and the US, a permanent member of the council); its mandate ends on 31 December 2026 and it is expected to disappear from Lebanon in 2027 at the latest.

Following the US–Israeli joint strikes on Iran on 28 February 2026, Hezbollah condemned the attacks, stating "we are confident that the American and Israeli enemy will receive a great slap and will reap nothing but failure from its tyrannical, criminal aggression." On 1 March, after Iran confirmed the death of Ali Khamenei in the US–Israeli strikes, Hezbollah's secretary-general Naim Qassem vowed to retaliate and "undertake our duty of confronting the aggression", stating Hezbollah would not leave "the field of honor and resistance." Hezbollah later claimed that the attack was a "defensive act" after over a year of Israeli attacks despite a truce. It added that it restarted fighting to force Israel to stop its aggression and evacuate from seized Lebanese territories, emphasizing that the move was unrelated to the Iran war.

== Main events ==
=== First week (2–8 March) ===
On 2 March, Hezbollah launched several projectiles into northern Israel, the first time it had done so since the 2024 ceasefire, targeting a missile defense site south of Haifa. Hezbollah said it restarted fighting to force Israel to stop its aggression and evacuate from seized Lebanese territories, emphasizing that the move was unrelated to the Iran war. The Israel Defense Forces (IDF) said it had intercepted one projectile originating from Lebanon, letting several others fall into open sites. In response, Israeli jets struck targets in the Lebanese capital of Beirut at 3am local time, issuing evacuation orders to local civilians in 50 villages across Southern Lebanon and the Beqaa Valley. The Israeli military said it carried out "precise and targeted" strikes against "senior terrorist elements of the Hezbollah terrorist organization in the Beirut area" and "a central terrorist element of the Hezbollah terrorist organization in southern Lebanon." Early reports suggested the intended targets were Naim Qassem and Mohammad Raad. Later, Saudi news channel Al Hadath reported Raad's whereabouts were unknown and stated his body was being searched for in the rubble. The IDF said Hezbollah's intelligence chief, Hussain Makled, was killed in the strikes. Adham Adnan al-Othman, senior commander of the Palestinian Islamic Jihad in Lebanon, was also killed in an airstrike in Beirut's southern suburbs.

On 3 March, Hezbollah fired missiles and drones targeting three Israeli bases, Ramat David Airbase, the Meron monitoring base and Camp Yitzhak. Israel carried out airstrikes on Hezbollah strongholds and also targeted Al-Manar TV's headquarters in Beirut. Later on in the day, Israeli forces were ordered to seize positions within Lebanon. Israel said its military had seized "strategic areas" in southern Lebanon while ordering nearby Lebanese towns to evacuate. Israel struck Yohmor with white phosphorus, illegal under international law, causing several homes to catch fire.

On 4 March, Hezbollah launched drone and missiles into Israel, attempting to hit military bases and oil and gas infrastructures. Hezbollah anti-tank fire caused moderate injuries to two Israeli soldiers in southern Lebanon, making them the first Israeli injuries of the conflict. Israel launched strikes targeting the communications centers of Hezbollah, during which al-Manar TV station and al-Nour radio station were struck. More strikes were focused on villages in southern Lebanon used by Hezbollah. Following Hezbollah's continued attacks, Israel issued an immediate urgent evacuation warning to South Lebanon residents, telling them to move north of the Litani River. UN peacekeeping force reported Israeli soldiers entered several towns and villages in Southern Lebanon, including Kfar Kila, Houla, Kfar Shouba, Yaroun and Khiam.

Israel carried out an incursion into southern Syria on 4 March, shelling the area between Jamla and Saisoun in Daraa Governorate, and arrested four civilians. Israel accused Syria of deploying combat units to the Syrian Golan Heights, stating it will not allow the Hezbollah–Israel strikes to be used as a pretext to "harm the Druze" in southern Syria and demanded the Syrian government prevent Iraqi militias from crossing Syrian territory toward the Golan Heights.

UNIFIL published on 5 March that since 2 March it monitored over 210 missiles fired by Hezbollah into Israel. Israel killed a Hamas official in a strike in Beirut, as well as several strikes early in the day, including two in the Hezbollah stronghold of south Beirut. More attacks continued, targeting Hezbollah facilities and operatives, as it renewed its evacuation warning to residence in Southern Lebanon, close to sites it will target. At midday, the IDF published an immediate evacuation notice to the southern suburbs of Beirut, specifically Bourj el-Barajneh, Hadath, Haret Hreik and Chiyah. Residents were advised by the IDF to move north and east.

After Israel ordered inhabitants of the entire portion of Lebanon that is south of the Litani River to evacuate (along with some other areas), Hezbollah issued its own orders to civilians in a five-kilometer-wide strip of Israeli territory bordering Lebanon to evacuate. This message was published by Hezbollah in Hebrew, along with maps of the zone to be evacuated. Israeli sources described Hezbollah's self-described evacuation orders as psychological warfare; Israel said it is not evacuating the area. Hezbollah repeated the supposed evacuation order in the following days and weeks.

Hezbollah conducted a series of attacks on Israel and Israeli forces on 6 March, launching rockets and artillery shells toward the Golan Heights and Haifa. During the night and morning after issuing advance warnings to minimize civilian casualties, Israel launched a series of airstrikes targeting Hezbollah headquarters located in ten high-rise buildings in Beirut. The strikes also targeted warehouses where drones used in attacks against Israel were reportedly stored. A Hezbollah projectile fired near the Lebanese border injured eight Israeli soldiers, five severely. Among the injured was the son of far-right finance minister Bezalel Smotrich. Two Israeli missile strikes hit a UNIFIL battalion headquarters in al-Qaouzah in Bint Jbeil, injuring four UN peacekeepers from Ghana.

On 7 March, Hezbollah continued firing missiles and rockets into northern Israel; no deaths were reported. Israel's retaliation included attacks in the eastern Lebanese town of Nabi Chit, were reports say an operation to search for Ron Arad took place. The Lebanese health ministry reported that Israeli military killed over 41 people there, and injured 40 more. The deaths include at least three soldiers of the Lebanese Armed Forces and one from Lebanon's General Security Directorate. Later that day an evacuation notice was issued by the IDF to Zqouq El Mufdi, Tyre. These evacuation notices were followed by "Save your lives" notices and reminders to residents to stay away from their homes.

Israel launched an airstrike on the Ramada hotel building in central Beirut on 8 March, killing four key Iranian commanders of the IRGC's elite Quds Force, who were planning terror attacks on Israel. Later the Israeli army stated they killed five senior commanders from the Lebanon Corps of the Quds Force of the Islamic Revolutionary Guard Corps in a precise strike in Beirut. Netanyahu said: "Whoever lays down their arms will save their life, and whoever doesn't, their blood will be spilled." A Hezbollah rocket attack in southern Lebanon damaged a Puma armored engineering vehicle and then hit a Caterpillar D9 bulldozer attempting to assist the vehicle, killing two soldiers.

Constantinos Kombos, Cyprus's Foreign Minister, stated the explosive-packed drones launched from Lebanon toward the island, were launched by Hezbollah, targeting British bases there.

==== Airstrike on Ghazali family home (5 March) ====
Ghazali family killing
- Location: 33°31′41″N 35°39′6″E; Machghara
- Date: 5 March 2026 at sunset (17:56 EET)
- Target: Ibrahim Ghazali
- Attack type: Assassination (targeted killing) with other casualties
- Weapon: Airstrike
- Deaths: 4 (2 men + 2 children): Ibrahim Ghazali; Ibrahim's children: Ali and Fatima; Ibrahim's brother: Kassim Ghazali
- Injuries: 4 (both men's wives and parents)
- Perpetrators: Israel Defense Forces; (Israel) Israeli Air Force

On the evening of 5 March 2026, four members of the Ghazali family were killed by an Israeli airstrike on their home in Mashghara, southern Lebanon. The attack on the family home occurred while they were gathered for Iftar, the meal that breaks the fast at the end of the day in Ramadan. The men's maternal uncle, Fouad Qasem, who lived nearby, helped recover the bodies. He told NPR, "I held my own flesh and blood in my hands... What did the children do to deserve this?"

On 8 March, a memorial service was held for the family in Dearborn Heights, Michigan, where other family members lived. The service was attended by hundreds of people. One of the family members in Michigan was United States citizen Ayman Ghazali, the men's brother and the children's uncle. On 12 March, Ayman Ghazali attacked the Temple Israel synagogue. Ayman's suicide was the only death in the attack, but a security guard was injured and responding police officers were treated for smoke inhalation.

On 15 March, the IDF claimed responsibility for the attack in Lebanon, alleging that Ibrahim Ghazali (the children's father) was a Hezbollah commander and describing Ibrahim as "eliminated", the term the IDF uses for assassinations. The IDF's Arabic language spokesperson Avichai Adraee further alleged that Ibrahim Ghazali was in Hezbollah's anti-tank missile unit. In response to the statements by Israel, a Hezbollah spokesperson said that none of the family members were affiliated with Hezbollah.

=== Second week (9–15 March) ===
A double strike on a house in Al-Qlayaa killed Lebanese Maronite Catholic priest Father Pierre al-Rahi. According to Hezbollah, on 9 March the organization fought Israeli forces that landed once again in eastern Lebanon near Nabi Sheet. This time they were 15 Israeli helicopters that came from the Syrian side of the border. Hezbollah kept firing rocket and missiles in to Israel. During the day Israel targeted strikes on the Al-Qard Al-Hasan Association, an US-sanctioned institution known for funding Hezbollah. Before mid night, the Syrian Army informed Hezbollah shelled their positions. The Syrian Army declared they detected Hezbollah's reinforcements at the Syrian-Lebanese border.

The Syrian Army said they would coordinate a possible Syrian response to Hezbollah's actions with the Lebanese government side. On the same day, Syria reported early in the morning that artillery shells fired from Lebanon landed near a town 20 miles west of Damascus. Syria accused Hezbollah of targeting Syrian army positions in the area and said that it had observed Hezbollah reinforcements arriving along the Lebanon–Syria border, warning that it would respond to any attack on its territory.

Hezbollah claimed it targeted sites in Tell al-Hamames, south of the city of Khiam. According to reports Hezbollah and Iran fired missiles on northern Israel. It was reported that residents from Aalma El Chaeb in South Lebanon, left the town toward Tyre, escorted by LAF and UNIFIL forces. Later Israel issued warning to residence of Arnoun, Yohmor, Zawtar El Charqiyeh, and Zawtar El Gharbiyeh residents to evacuate.

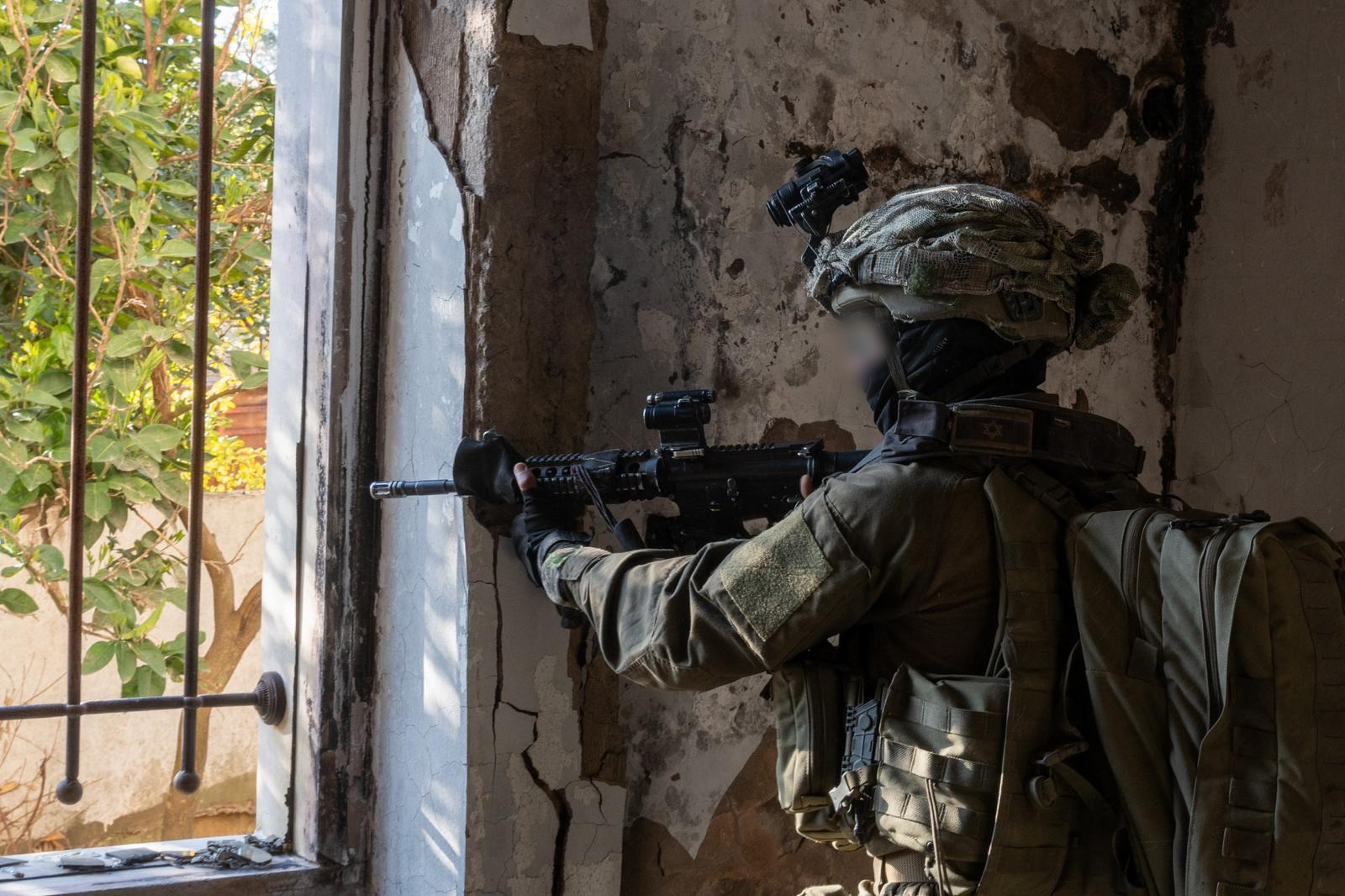
Israeli soldier in Southern Lebanon, 11 March

Lebanon's state-run National News Agency, reported about airstrikes over night on 11 March, that were later confirmed by the Israeli military. It was followed by an evacuation notice issued to six villages in south Lebanon. The IDF confirmed Iranian commander Ali Musallam Tabaja was killed during the airstrikes. On 12 March, an Israeli airstrike on the outskirts of the village of Ain Ebel killed three men.

Lebanon's health ministry said on 13 March that an Israeli airstrike hit a health center in Burj Qalaouiyah killing 12 people—nearly the entire medical team of paramedics, doctors, and nurses—leaving only one severely injured worker alive. Four others remain missing.

During the night of 13/14 March, fighting continued in Khiam. Israel continued to conduct airstrikes across Lebanon on 14 March, including areas outside of Hezbollah's operations. An airstrike on an apartment in Bourj Hammoud in northeastern Beirut killed at least one person and wounded four others.

=== Third week (16–22 March) ===
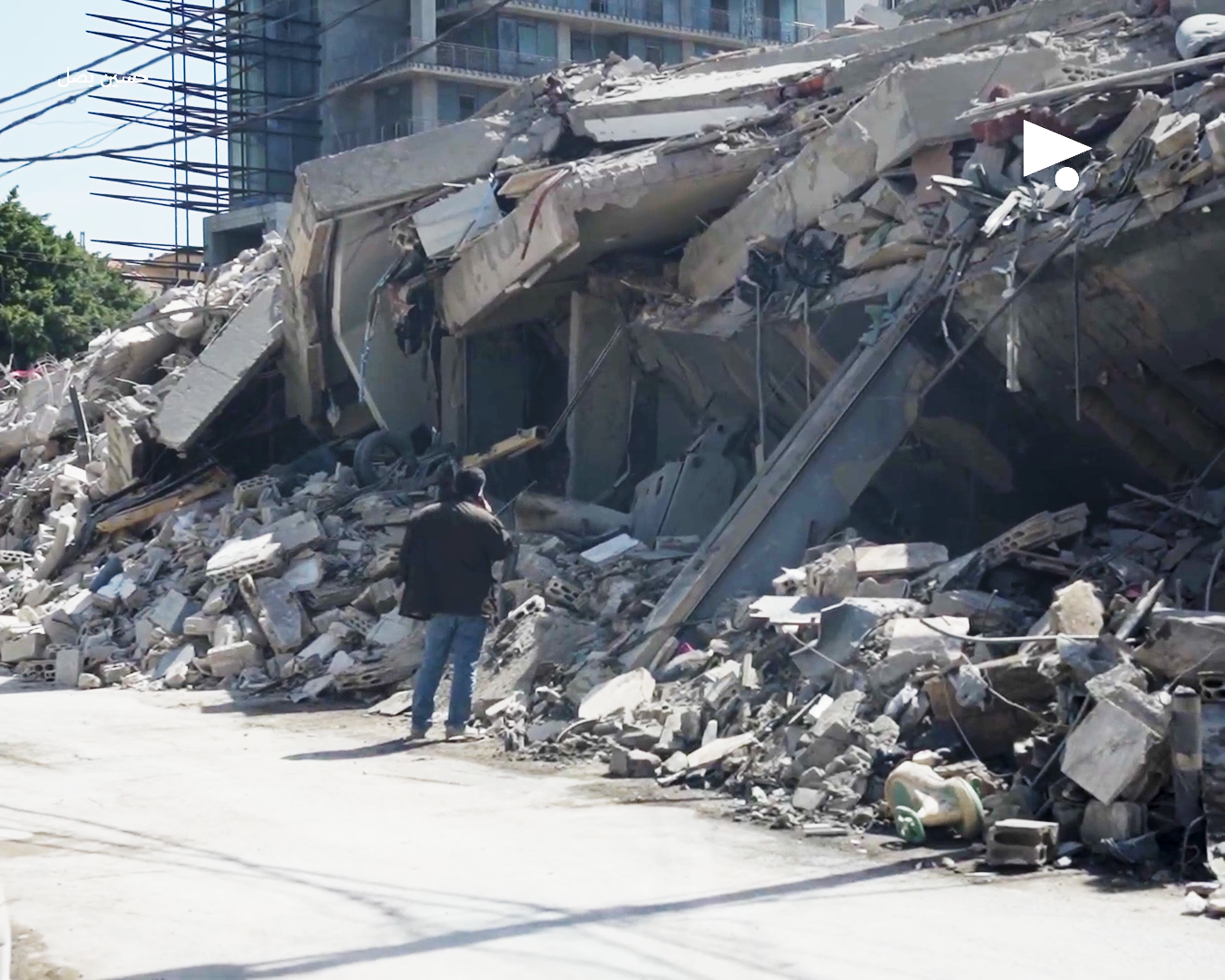
Aftermath of an airstrike in Bachoura, Beirut, on 18 March

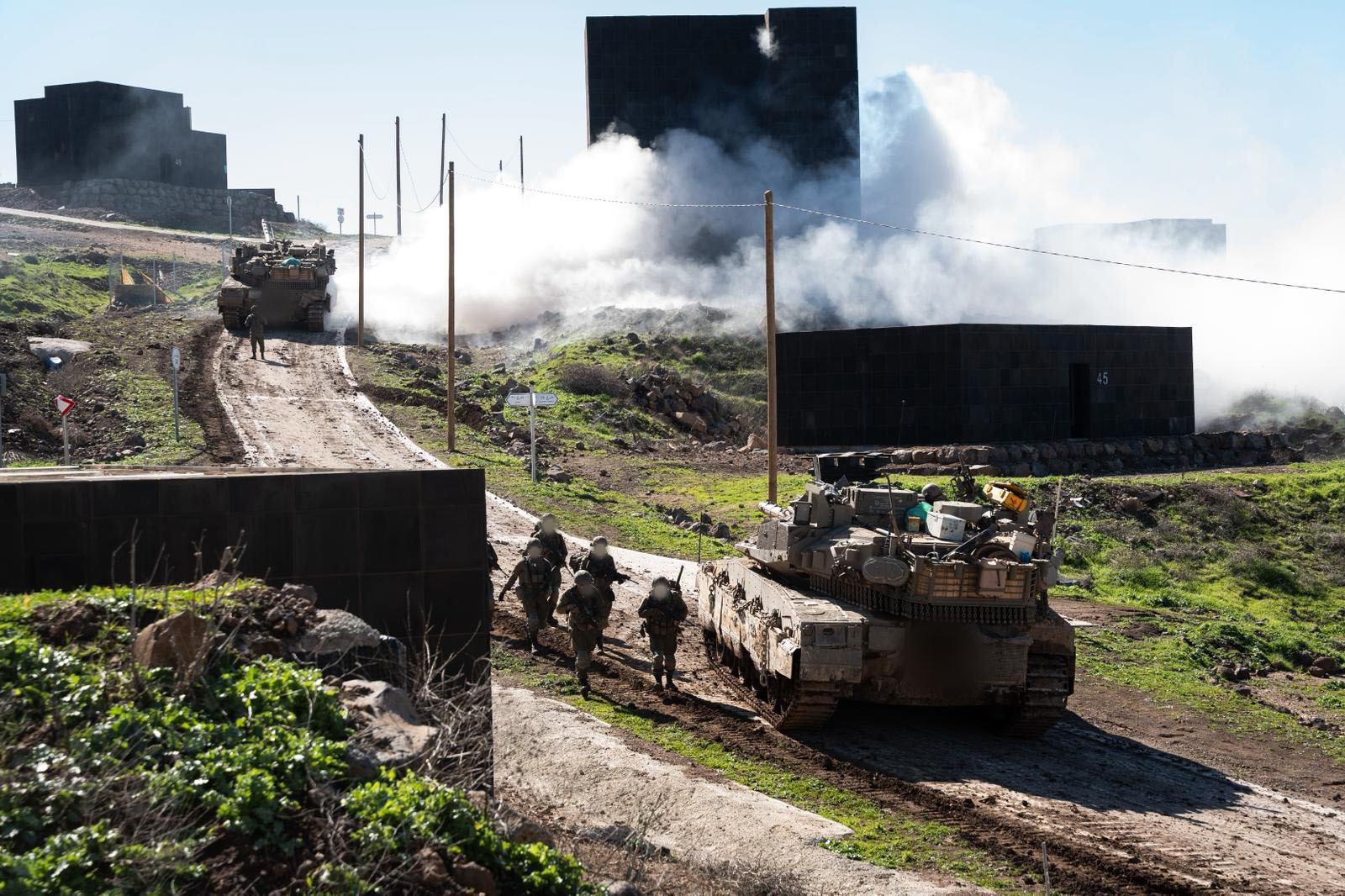
IDF 162nd Division on the Israel–Lebanon border, 21 March

The IDF announced on 16 March that it had begun a "targeted ground operation against key targets" in southern Lebanon, aimed at establishing "the forward defense area." Defense Minister Israel Katz said that such operations would continue until Hezbollah no longer posed a threat to northern Israeli communities, and ruled out displaced Lebanese people returning to their homes in the south until then. He added that the operations will resemble the Israeli invasion of the Gaza Strip, "just as was done against Hamas in Rafah, Beit Hanoun and the terror tunnels in Gaza." Hezbollah Secretary-General Naim Qassem has been designated a target for elimination.

Four injuries were reported in northern Israel as a result of Hezbollah rocket attacks on the area, including three in Nahariya and one in Kibbutz Kabri. An Israeli soldier from the Givati Brigade was injured during an operational accident. An Israeli airstrike hit a building near Jabal Amel Hospital outside Tyre killed one person and injured five others. Fighting was reported at the Hezbollah stronghold of Al-Khiyam in southern Lebanon where a "major battle was under way" with at least three airstrikes in the city. Israel also struck targets in Yatar, Burj Qalaouiyah, as-Sultaniyah, Shaqra, Qantara, and as-Sawana.

Mahmoud Qamati, Hezbollah's political council vice president, threatened to topple the cabinet of Nawaf Salam after the war ends, comparing it to Vichy France's regime. The Kuwaiti Ministry of Interior said it arrested a 16-member Hezbollah cell with weapons, drone and encrypted communications devices, which planned an attack. On 17 March, the IDF said it had deployed a second division to southern Lebanon, launching a ground invasion. Israel Katz said the operation would be similar to the Gaza war, suggested that Israel could occupy some Lebanese territory indefinitely and ruled out the return of displaced Lebanese people to their homes as long as Hezbollah remained a threat. In a joint statement, Canada, France, Germany, Italy, and the UK said such an operation should be avoided. Syria was pressured to militarily intervene in Lebanon by the United States by sending its troops and striking positions in Lebanon alongside the IDF in order to further weaken Hezbollah; however, the Syrian government refused the offer on the same day Israel Katz declared a ground invasion of southern Lebanon. Saudi Arabia, Qatar, Egypt, and Turkey discouraged a confrontation between Syria and Hezbollah.

Israel conducted extensive overnight strikes in central Beirut on 18 March, which were largely unannounced with no warnings issued, killing at least 10 people and injuring 27. Two Israeli soldiers were wounded by a Hezbollah mortar attack in northern Israel on 21 March. Civilians were also injured as munitions fired by Hezbollah struck civilian buildings in northern Israeli border towns, including Ma'alot.

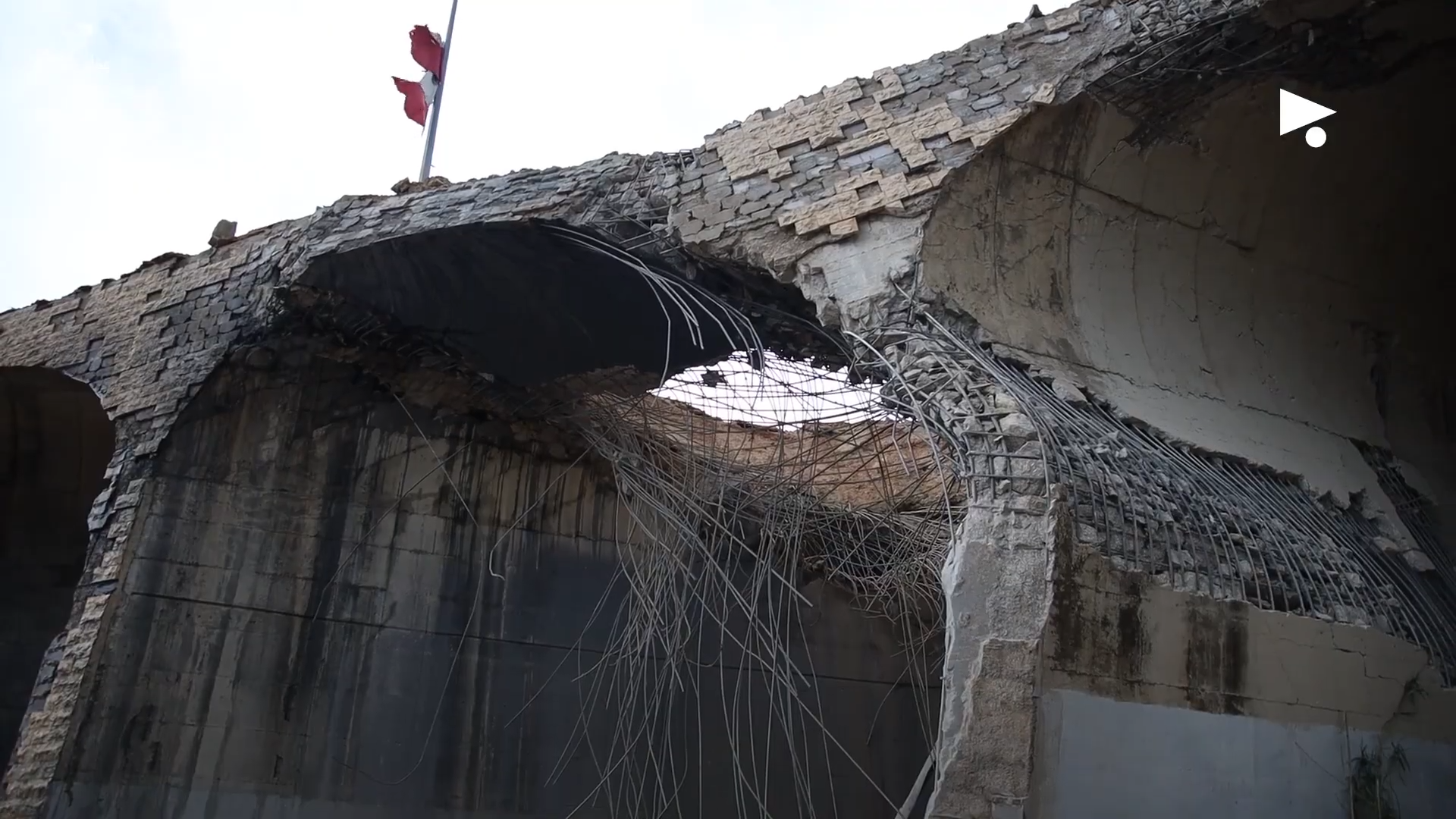
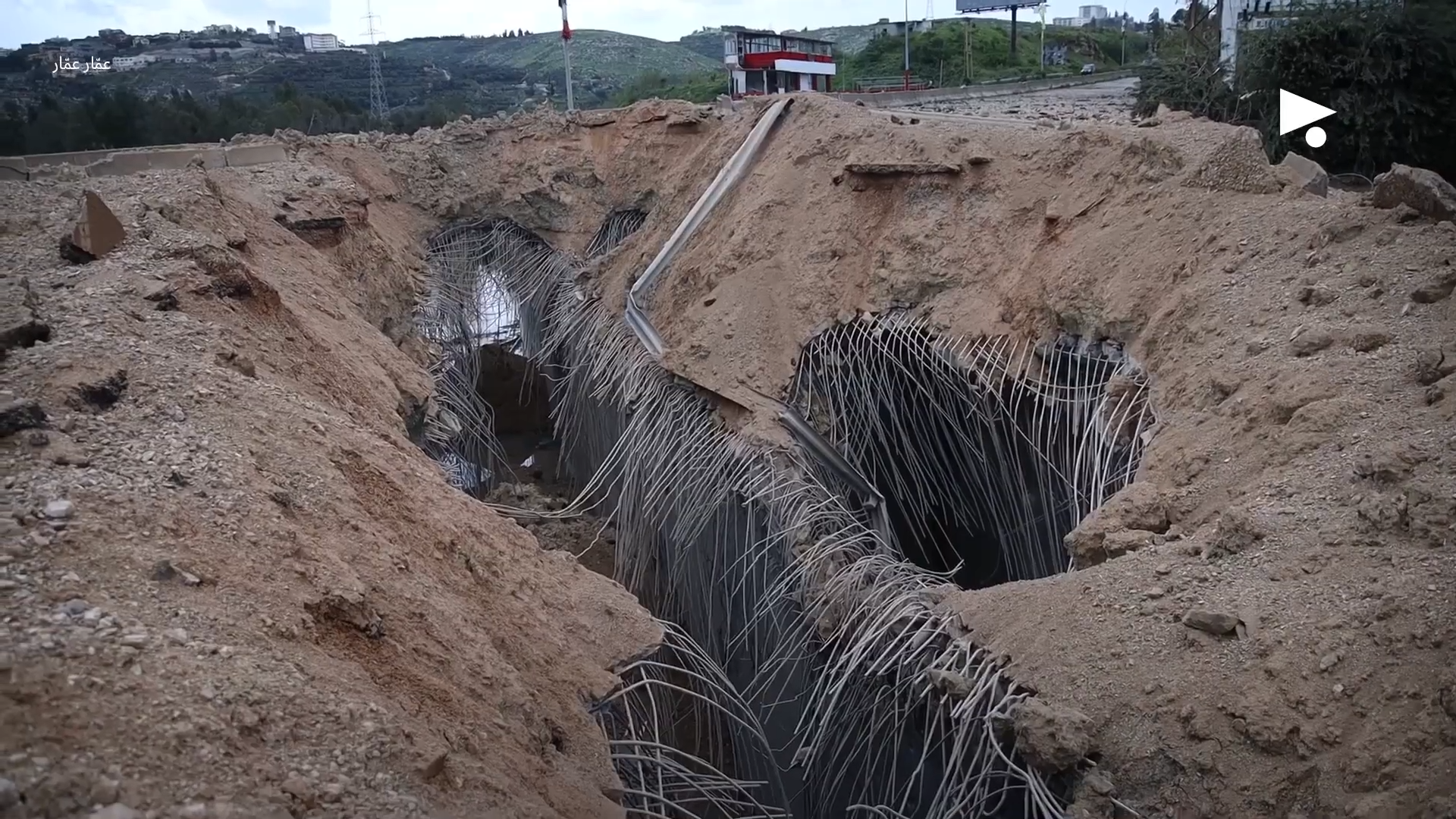
The Qasmiyeh Bridge after it was destroyed by Israeli forces

Israel's Defense Minister Katz declared that the IDF would demolish the Lebanese villages bordering Israel and destroy all the Litani river crossings. Following a warning, Israel destroyed the Qasmiyeh Bridge, the main bridge over the Litani river, connecting Lebanon and south Lebanon. Lebanese prime minister Nawaf Salam said that Hezbollah's operations are commanded by IRGC officers. The IDF reported that seven soldiers were wounded on Lebanon in separate incidents. IDF Chief of General Staff Eyal Zamir approved plans "to advance the targeted ground operations and strikes" against Hezbollah, and that this would be a "prolonged operation". The Israeli military said it killed Abu Khalil Barji, a commander in Hezbollah's Radwan Force, and two other Hezbollah operatives in an air strike in the Majdal Selem area of southern Lebanon. That same day, an Israeli avocado farmer was killed from a misfired artillery by the IDF near the Israeli–Lebanese border. Hezbollah official Wafiq Safa in an interview admitted Hezbollah had started the war for revenge over the assassination of Khamenei and threatened the Lebanese government with the repeat of the 7 May clashes.

=== Fourth week (23–29 March) ===
On 23 March the IDF struck the Dallafa Bridge in southern Lebanon, which it accuses Hezbollah of using to send militants and weapons to fight Israel. Finance Minister Bezalel Smotrich stated that Israel, following the war, should annex territories up to the Litani River. Satellite imagery from 23 March showed the remains of the Khiam detention center being demolished.

The Lebanese government declared the Iranian ambassador Mohammad Reza Sheibani persona non grata on 24 March, giving him time until Sunday to leave. According to Iran International (which opposes the current Iranian regime) Iran fired a ballistic missile at Lebanon several hours after the expulsion of the ambassador was announced, and the projectile struck Lebanon's coast in Sahel Alma (Keserwan District). Other reports indicate that Sahel Alma was only hit by debris, and that it occurred when an Israeli interceptor missile shot down, over Keserwan, a ballistic missile launched from Iran. Various sources from the US military intel heavily suggest the target was located on Cyprus.

Israel's defense minister, Israel Katz openly stated that the military will take control of south Lebanon all the way to the Litani river, mirroring the claims of Smotrich from the previous day. Hassan Fadlallah, a lawmaker of Hezbollah, vowed that the group would fight Israel to prevent the plan from coming to fruition, labeling it as one of the goals of the organization during the war.

Also on 24 March, an Israeli drone strike targeted the residence of a teacher in Ain Ebel, but the family members on the ground floor survived unharmed. Israel reported that missile fire from Lebanon killed one Israeli civilian and wounded another two. Israeli Defense minister Israel Katz states that the military will control a "security zone" up to the Litani River in southern Lebanon until the threat of Hezbollah is removed.

Nethanyahu followed Katz's and Smotrich's statement on 25 March calling for the creation of a "security/buffer zone" in Southern Lebanon. Iran asserted that Lebanon must be included as part of a ceasefire deal with the United States and Israel, thereby conditioning a ceasefire in the 2026 Iran war on a cessation of hostilities against Hezbollah. Two IDF soldiers were killed by Hezbollah attacks on Southern Lebanon on 26 March. One Israeli civilian was killed by Hezbollah rocket fire in Nahariyah. The IDF said that it was sending more troops from the 162nd Division to join two other army divisions in southern Lebanon to expand the "buffer zone" in the area.

The IDF made relatively rapid advances into southern Lebanon on 27 March, advancing north past the coastal town of Naqoura toward Bayada. Hezbollah said that it had targeted an Israeli tank in Bayada. An Israeli airstrike in southern Lebanon on 28 March killed two prominent Lebanese television journalists: Ali Choeib (also known as Ali Shaib) who worked for the Hezbollah-affiliated Al-Manar and Fatima Ftouni, who worked for the pro-Hezbollah Al Mayadeen. The IDF stated that Choeib had been exposing Israeli military positions, and described him as a member of Radwan force, Hezbollah's special operations unit. Israeli military posted a photo of Choeib in military fatigues on its X account and when asked for a source of the image, a military spokesperson said "it was photoshopped".

An IDF soldier was reported killed by a Hezbollah attack, while another three soldiers were wounded in south Lebanon. Israel killed two Lebanese paramedics in Bint Jbeil with airstrikes, and later accused Hezbollah of making "extensive military use" of ambulances and other medical facilities. Lebanese military sources told Al Jazeera that Israeli troops had bypassed Aitaroun and reached the outskirts of Wadi al-Salouqi, at the same time entering the town of Bayada, advanced toward the Litani from below the town of Qantara near al-Muhaysibat and also east of it.

The Iranian diplomatic source told Agence France-Presse the Iranian ambassador who is declared persona non grata defied the Lebanese government's order to leave.

Syrian authorities launched a crackdown on tunnels along the border with Lebanon used for smuggling arms by Hezbollah. The Syrian defense ministry announced the discovery and closure of two tunnels on the border of Lebanon used for smuggling by Hezbollah.

=== Fifth week (30 March – 5 April) ===
On 29 March, a UNIFIL position was shelled by Israel, killing a UNIFIL peacekeeper from Indonesia. On 30 March, two more UNIFIL peacekeepers from Indonesia were killed, this time when one vehicle in a convoy was hit by an explosion. In this case, the UN states they were most likely killed by a tripwire-activated explosive device planted by Hezbollah, because another explosive device of this kind was found nearby.

Also on 30 March, a UNIFIL patrol was stopped by Hezbollah in Deir Qanoun an-Naher on its main street and ordered to leave the area, which the patrol refused, resulting in gunfire from both sides.

Israeli media reported the death of four IDF soldiers in clashes with Hezbollah, three of whom were the from the Nahal Brigade's Reconnaissance Unit.

On 1 April, an Israeli Navy strike in Beirut killed the commander of Hezbollah's Southern Front, Hajj Yusuf Ismail Hashem, whose predecessor Ali Karaki was killed in September 2024. Hezbollah confirmed Hashem's death, stating that it was their harshest loss since the killing of Haytham Ali Tabatabai in November 2025. An IDF soldier was killed and another wounded on 4 April after a friendly fire incident in Sheeba southern Lebanon, during a commando raid.

The IDF hit a four-story building on 4 April, part of a church-sponsored social housing complex, in Ain Saade, a Christian locality not far from Beirut, killing at least three people including local politician Pierre Moawad (of Lebanese Forces, a party which currently forms the ruling coalition in Lebanon and is opposed to Hezbollah), his wife, and their female neighbor. The IDF said they were targeting a Hezbollah member hiding among local Christians, and that Moawad was not the intended target. Misinformation about the strike circulated online included a faked memo (a voice note) supposedly left by Pierre Moawad before his death. An account about a man who left the building and drove away on a motorcycle roughly around the time of the strike was relayed by the slain couple's daughter to journalists; media reports quoting the Lebanese army said the man on the motorcycle was a delivery driver, who had been delivering medications to one of the building's residents for a few months but L'Orient Today later wrote that, per an anonymous judicial source, the man was an unnamed Hezbollah official visiting his girlfriend. There has been speculation that Israeli strikes on Christian communities in Lebanon are aimed at inflaming sectarian tensions.

=== Sixth week (6–12 April) ===
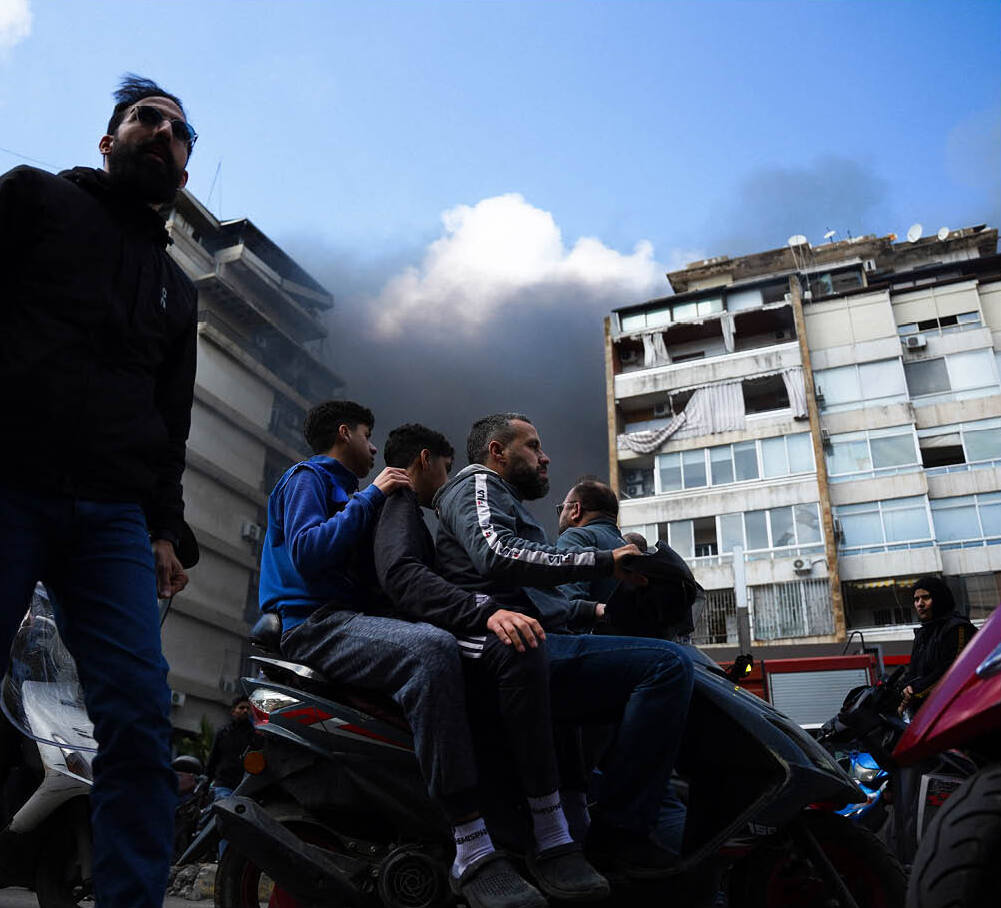
Smoke rises after an Israeli strike on Beirut during the 8 April attacks.

On 6 April, IDF spokesman Avichay Adraee ordered the southern suburbs of Beirut to be evacuated, because Israel will strike "Hezbollah infrastructure" there. The Israeli Ground Forces deployed the 98th Division into southern Lebanon on 7 April, in addition to the 36th, 91st, 146th, and 162nd divisions already there. The stated goal of their operation was to destroy buildings near the border being used for military purposes and to push Hezbollah members north of the Litani River. According to the Israeli paper Yedioth Ahronoth, the IDF was preparing a plan to continue the operations and ground occupation in Lebanon even after the Iran war ends. Hezbollah said on the same day that "fierce clashes" were taking place between its fighters and Israeli troops in Bint Jbeil, and that rocket and drone strikes targeted soldiers and Merkava tanks in the town, and in other settlements in southern Lebanon or northern Israel. Israeli troops destroyed buildings in Khiam and other border towns.

Israel agreed to a two-week ceasefire with Iran as part of the 7 April 2026 Iran war ceasefire. Although Pakistani prime minister Shehbaz Sharif said that the ceasefire includes all fronts of the war, including Lebanon, Israel rejected Sharif's condition, asserting that the ceasefire "does not include Lebanon." The United States has also said that the ceasefire does not include Lebanon. Hezbollah said that it had halted attacks on Israel and on Israeli soldiers in Lebanon.

Hours after the ceasefire announcement, Israel launched Operation Eternal Darkness on 8 April, which, per Israel, included a wide-ranging operation targeting all of Hezbollah's command and control centers in southern Lebanon, Beirut and the Bekaa Valley. The attacks were the largest since the start of the war, with Israel saying that its military hit over 100 targets within ten minutes. The attacks have killed at least 357 people. One IDF soldier was killed and five wounded in clashes with Hezbollah fighters in South Lebanon.

In the early hours of 9 April, Hezbollah said it launched a missile attack against northern Israel. Meanwhile, in Lebanon, Israeli strikes continued. Later, the IDF announced that it had killed Hezbollah leader Naim Qassem's personal secretary and nephew, Ali Yusuf Harshi in a strike on Beirut. Hezbollah was also reported to have fired "dozens" of rockets into Israel from Lebanon. At around 17:00 Israel Daylight Time, The Jerusalem Post reported that the 98th Division of the IDF had almost fully taken control of all of the town of Bint Jbeil, which had become the main site of ground combat between Hezbollah and the IDF.

On early 10 April, Israel launched a wave of strikes across Lebanon, killing at least 28 people, including 13 Lebanese State Security personnel at an office in Nabatieh. During a visit to Israeli commanders near Bint Jbeil, IDF chief of staff Eyal Zamir said that the IDF is in a "state of war" in Lebanon, despite the ceasefire with Iran.

On 12 April, a Lebanese security source informed that the Israeli army cut off all main roads leading to besieged Bint Jbeil and kept pounding it with air strikes, artillery shells and white phosphorus bombs, but still hasn't been yet able to capture important sites within the city itself, with clashes occurring all over the city outskirts. Prime Minister Netanyahu and Defense Minister Katz visited Israeli troops inside Lebanon, with Katz saying that Israel will eliminate the threat "just as we did in Gaza," including with the demolition of homes so that they cannot be used as "terror outposts."

=== Seventh week (13–19 April) ===
On 13 April, the IDF said to have killed over 100 Hezbollah fighters in Bint Jbeil in the past several days and to have successfully encircled the city, stating the complete takeover is expected to take a few more days. One IDF sergeant was killed in combat in Southern Lebanon.

On 15 April, Israel and Hezbollah forces in Lebanon engaged in more strikes against each other. A day later, two Israeli airstrikes destroyed the Qasmiyeh Bridge, the last remaining link between the area south of the Litani River and the rest of the country.

On 16 April, President Trump announced that Israel and Lebanon agreed to a 10-day truce, after his conversations with Prime Minister Netanyahu and President Aoun. The ceasefire entered into force on the night of 16/17 April local time. The IDF said the death of Ali Reda Abbas and other unnamed Hezbollah commanders, and alleged to have eliminated over 150 militants by the end of operations. Israeli defense minister Katz said that the IDF will hold its positions in southern Lebanon, and the Israeli military warned residents of the area to remain north of the Litani River, while the Lebanese military reported several violations of the ceasefire by Israel. The violations reportedly took place with attacks in Khiam and Bint Jbeil, and shelling in Dibbin. According to IDF commanders, residents will not be allowed to return to 55 villages that are in its operational zone, and PM Netanyahu stressed that the fight against Hezbollah is not over.

On 17 April, Israel killed one Hezbollah member in a drone strike on a motorcycle, and throughout 17 April and 18 April killed other Hezbollah members in several other strikes in Lebanon, in at least two cases stating that the Hezbollah members posed a threat. On 17 April, an IDF soldier was killed in Lebanon after entering a building previously rigged with explosives by Hezbollah. On 18 April, another IDF soldier was killed and 9 others wounded, one severely, when one of IDF bulldozers drove over an explosive device. Israel continued to perform demolitions of buildings in Israeli-occupied areas of Lebanon.

Israel said it continued strikes on military targets, which came in violation of the ceasefire. According to a security source familiar to Asharq Al-Awsat, the violations included artillery bombardments, drone strikes, house-to-house fighting, laying booby traps and destruction of houses.

A French soldier was killed by gunfire and three others injured in an attack on UNIFIL peacekeepers in Deir Kifa on 18 April. French president Emmanuel Macron attributed the attack to Hezbollah, which the group denied. Another French UNIFIL peacekeeper who was wounded in the attack died on 22 April from his injuries.

The Israeli military announced on the same day that it established a "yellow line" in southern Lebanon, like it did in Gaza. The zone which Israel intends to control, as marked on a map published by the IDF, covers a larger area than Israeli ground forces controlled at the moment of the ceasefire: a wider belt of Lebanon's southernmost areas, plus new areas of the Marjayoun District and even some areas north of the Litani River; and an area around the town of Shebaa (not to be confused with Shebaa Farms) and northeast of it. In total, the zone encompasses 55 towns and villages. Israeli ground forces continued military operations within that zone during the ceasefire.

On the afternoon of 19 April, according to Hezbollah, their members used explosive devices against a column of Israeli tanks (between Taybeh and Deir Siryan).

Widespread outrage has erupted following the circulation of a viral photograph and video showing an Israeli soldier smashing a statue of Jesus Christ with a sledgehammer in the southern Lebanese village of Debel. The incident has drawn condemnation from religious leaders, international figures, and the Israeli government. The incident occurred in Debel on 19 April 2026, shortly after a ceasefire began. Videos and photos show a soldier in uniform striking a fallen statue of Christ at a small residential shrine.

=== Eighth week (20–26 April) ===
Israel warned residents of southern Lebanon to stay out of the area, and as of 21 April, Israeli troops were still battling Hezbollah forces in spite of the ceasefire. On the same day, Israeli forces said that Hezbollah violated the ceasefire by launching rockets at an Israeli position in Rab Thalathin and a drone into northern Israel. It added that it hit the rocket launcher as a response to one of those incidents. Hezbollah said that it fired rockets and attack drones toward a site in northern Israel that it said was the source of artillery shelling toward a town in south Lebanon in retaliation for what it said were Israeli violations of the truce.

As of 22 April, Israel continued demolitions of civilian infrastructure in occupied areas of Lebanon; large-scale demolition operations were reported in Khiam "in a scene that suggests an attempt to completely erase the town's identity" and in Qantara (both in the Marjayoun District). In the Bint Jbeil District, tank/artillery shelling and controlled demolitions of infrastructure continued in and around Rshaf and Mais al-Jabal, and Israel was systematically leveling residential areas of the town of Bint Jbeil itself.

Among the places where Israeli strikes were reported on 22 April was Yohmor al-Shaqif, which is north of the Litani River. Hezbollah claimed at least one attack on Israeli soldiers in Qantara and also claimed to have hit an artillery location set up by the IDF in Bayada, south Lebanon, with an explosive-laden drone.

The IDF disclosed that a retired colonel, experienced in drone warfare and currently in active reserve service, was killed in Israel in an off-duty accident unrelated to the war.

An Israeli strike hit a car in Tiri; journalists driving behind the car that was hit took shelter in a building, which was also targeted, killing journalist Amal Khalil.

Israeli strikes on 23 April included a drone strike on a car near Choukine. Demolition of still-remaining houses was in progress in Deir Siryan.

During the night of 23–24 April, the IDF struck Touline (first at 10:30 pm, then during early morning) and Majdel Zoun, using warplanes and artillery. Both are located on the border (the furthest extent) of the "forward defense zone" that Israel claims in Lebanon. The locality of Khirbet Selm was also attacked. Hezbollah fired a salvo of rockets at the region of Shtula (Israel) early the same night, shortly after 11:00 p.m.

During the same night (afternoon in the United States), US president Donald Trump announced the extension of the ceasefire in Lebanon by three more weeks. Just like a week before, the ceasefire announcement came after a meeting between the Lebanese ambassador and the Israeli ambassador in Washington, D.C.; these meetings are a departure from the rule not to maintain contacts with Israel, which before the current Israeli military operation (March 2026–onward) was followed by all major political forces in Lebanon.

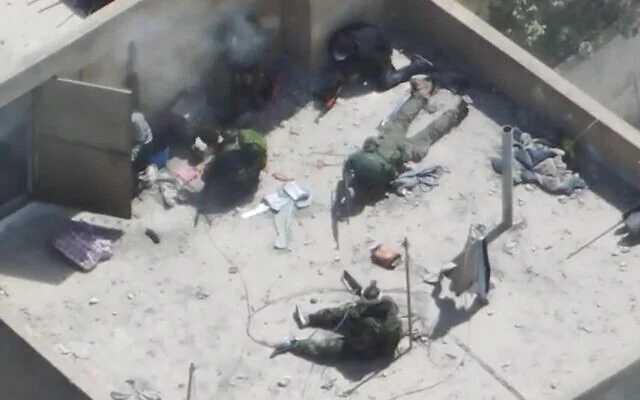
Hezbollah fighters on a rooftop in Bint Jbeil, 24 April 2026

On 24 April and 25 April, warfare continued, including Israeli strikes in Lebanon, demolitions of houses, and Hezbollah strikes on the IDF in Lebanon.

On the evening of 25 April, Israeli prime minister Benjamin Netanyahu announced an order to strike "with force" against Hezbollah in Lebanon. On 26 April, eastern parts of the Nabatieh District (which is north of the Litani River)—including areas claimed as part of the "forward defense zone" but not currently controlled by Israeli ground forces—came under intense Israeli fire. Other areas in south Lebanon also witnessed Israeli strikes. Throughout the day, Israeli strikes resulted in 14 fatalities. It was announced that an IDF soldier was killed near Taybeh, Lebanon, by an explosive-laden drone launched by Hezbollah.

=== Ninth week (27 April – 3 May) ===
Israel launched airstrikes on new areas of the Beqaa Valley in eastern Lebanon on 27 April. Also on that day, Hezbollah secretary-general Naim Qassem said that he "categorically rejects" the peace talks between the government of Lebanon and Israel, and that "the resistance" against Israel will continue. Lebanese president Joseph Aoun responded by saying that Lebanon will not sign a "humiliating agreement".

On 28 April, an Israeli Ministry of Defense contractor was killed by a Hezbollah drone while performing demolitions in occupied areas of Lebanon. Meanwhile, in Majdal Zoun, an Israeli strike killed three civil defense members working on the site of a previous strike; two other people were killed at the same site. On 29 April, a Lebanese soldier traveling home on a motorcycle was killed by one of the Israeli strikes.

On 30 April, an IDF soldier was killed in Qantara by an explosive-laden Hezbollah drone. Elsewhere, an Israeli airstrike killed a Lebanese soldier in his home, along with several members of his family.

Israel expanded its evacuation orders (also referred to as forced displacement orders) to 15 more towns and villages, this time including various towns and villages that surround the larger town of Nabatieh.

Over two days (30 April and 1 May), fourteen Israeli soldiers, but no civilians, were injured in two separate cases of a Hezbollah drone crossing into Israel and directly striking a vehicle next to which the soldiers were operating. In one case, the destroyed vehicle was an IDF artillery shell transporter.

Daily death tolls from Israeli strikes increased; over 40 people were killed on 1 May 2026, and again over 40 people on 2 May 2026, then 20 people on 3 May 2026 (according to tallies made on the afternoon of each day, which cover the preceding 24-hour period).

=== Tenth week (4–10 May) ===
Seventeen people were killed in total by Israeli strikes on 4 May 2026. Hezbollah claimed multiple attacks on IDF personnel and equipment in Lebanon. Fighting was reported in an area called Khallet Raj, near the Litani River: the IDF apparently tried to advance from Deir Siryan (southern bank of the river) toward Zawtar Sharqieh (northern bank of the river), and came under Hezbollah fire.

Six people were killed by Israeli strikes on 5 May 2026. In an escalation on 6 May 2026, there were 13 known fatalities as Israeli strikes targeted, among other places, Zellaya (West Bekaa) and Saksakieh (Sidon District). In the evening, Ahmed Ghaleb Balout, a senior military commander in Hezbollah's Radwan Force, was reportedly assassinated in an Israeli strike in Beirut, as well as two other commanders in other Israeli attacks.

There were 12 fatalities from Israeli strikes on 7 May 2026. An Israeli strike hit a rescue crew from the Islamic Health Committee (a health service which is affiliated with Hezbollah and which operates civil defense and ambulance services in Shia-majority areas) arriving at the site of a previous Israeli strike, killing one crew member. In two other cases their ambulances were fired on by Israeli forces.

There were 32 fatalities from Israeli strikes on 8 May 2026. An attempt by IDF ground forces to advance northward from Bayada was reportedly thwarted by Hezbollah the previous night. Throughout the day Hezbollah launched multiple attacks on IDF soldiers in Lebanon, and also wounded two IDF soldiers on the Israeli side of the border. Hezbollah also fired rockets at Israeli territory after 2 p.m. (no resulting injuries reported in Israel). On 9 May, 36 people were killed by Israeli strikes, and on 10 May the daily death toll was 51, according to tallies made on the afternoon of each day and covering the preceding 24-hour period. On 9 May, an Israeli strike at Saksakieh killed at least seven people, including a child, and injured around 15 others, according to the Lebanese Health Ministry.

On 9 May the IDF reported moderately and/or severely injured soldiers, just like during the previous days, but no deaths. An IDF soldier was killed on 10 May.

The US announced that Israel–Lebanon talks in Washington, D.C. are scheduled for 14 and 15 May. Lebanon will be represented in these talks by a delegation headed by former ambassador to the US Simon Karam.

=== Eleventh week (11–17 May) ===
There were 23 fatalities from Israeli strikes on 11 May.

The IDF made an announcement referring to the same area—the banks of the Litani, between Deir Siryan and Zawtar Sharqieh—where fighting between Hezbollah and the IDF was reported during the previous week; they said the IDF carried out a weeklong raid during which they crossed the Litani River, that during the raid they managed to move armored vehicles across the river, and that they carried out engineering activity to allow for easier crossing of the river during future raids, "if required".

The Israeli media reported that on 12 May Hezbollah carried out its largest coordinated drone attack since the beginning of the war. According to the media, the first wave hit Israeli soldiers in Lebanon and, at the same time, a target in northern Israel where Israeli soldiers were stationed; and the second wave, consisting of three drones, hit the same target in northern Israel again. An Israeli security source stated that, from the Israeli perspective, the worrying aspect of this attack was the simultaneous use of multiple drones against the same target. The Israeli army radio commented that in recent weeks, Hezbollah's fiber-optic drones have been able to evade interception by Israeli drone-jamming technology, causing "high casualties" (a few fatalities and a significant number of injured) among IDF troops.

Israeli attacks continued on 12 May and 13 May, including a strike on a civil defense center in Nabatieh, which killed two volunteer rescuers working there.

On the afternoon of 13 May, the known death toll over the past two days was 27 people: 13 were killed on 12 May, and 14 were killed on 13 May. However, by the end of the day it became known that on 13 May alone there were 22 fatalities, 8 of them children. Three children were killed in a strike in Arabsalim; elsewhere, Israel struck at least three vehicles on a busy highway leading south from Beirut, killing 8 including 2 children, with photographs of burning and burned-out SUVs and cars circulated by international media.

On 14 May, in the first known case of a Hezbollah strike wounding Israeli civilians in weeks, a drone hit a parking lot next to the border, injuring 4 people, 1 critically; according to Israeli reports, the injured were solely civilian workers, who came to an otherwise closed former tourist destination next to the border to perform renovation work there; Hezbollah's statements indicate they believed they were targeting IDF soldiers. An Israeli soldier was killed by mortar fire in Lebanon, with the IDF stating the death occurred on 14 May, and another soldier was killed on 15 May.

Over four days, from the afternoon of 13 May until the afternoon of 17 May, the daily death tolls from Israeli strikes averaged 23 people per day. On the night of 17 May, a Palestinian Islamic Jihad commander in Lebanon was killed in an Israeli airstrike in Baalbek. His 17-year-old daughter was also killed.

=== Twelfth week (18–24 May) ===
Lebanon's health ministry reported on 18 May that the total death toll surpassed 3,000 people. On 19 May, one particular Israeli strike, in Deir Qanoun al-Nahr, killed 6 men, 3 women and 3 children.

Senior security officials said that this week marks a change in the war tactics into a complex and multi-layered attrition operation. It comes to cause casualties to the IDF, deteriorate the Israeli sense of security, and undermine the operational prerogative along the border.

An IDF major was killed on 19 May when one or more Hezbollah militants, hidden in a disused church, opened fire on Israeli soldiers; this occurred in the ruins of Qaouzah, a border village mostly destroyed by Israeli bombardment in 2024 and currently evacuated.

On 18 May, one of Hezbollah's announcements said they launched a drone attack on a vehicle belonging to an IDF brigade commander (head of the 300th "Bar'am" Brigade). On 20 May, an IDF brigade commander (head of the 401st Armored Brigade), holding a rank of colonel, was severely wounded by an explosive-laden drone. Another officer, a lieutenant colonel, was also wounded.

The IDF also announced that elsewhere in Lebanon five soldiers were moderately and/or severely wounded by drones on 20 May. Hezbollah said it launched multiple attacks on an IDF force consisting of tanks and infantry near Haddatha.

On 22 May, an IDF soldier was killed and another severely wounded when a Hezbollah drone struck the Biranit military camp, on the Israeli side of the border. On 24 May, an IDF soldier was killed and another severely wounded in southern Lebanon.

=== Thirteenth week (25–31 May) ===
34 people were killed in Lebanon by Israeli strikes on 25 May (according to a tally made in the afternoon and covering the preceding 24-hour period). On 25 May, National Security Minister Itamar Ben-Gvir said the situation in northern Israel, including repeated alerts over Hezbollah drone infiltration, was “unacceptable.” He called for a return to “large-scale combat” and an escalation of military operations in Lebanon. On 26 May and the preceding night, 28 people were reported killed in Israeli strikes (later updated to 34 fatalities), and the number of times Israeli military aircraft flew into Lebanese airspace was notably high.

On the ground, on 26 May, the IDF was clashing with Hezbollah around Zawtar al-Sharqieh. Apparently, by evening, the IDF set up a position on the outskirts of the village. On 27 May, clashes continued in and around Zawtar al-Sharqieh (but according to reports from the afternoon, the IDF has not established control of the village) and also in the area that lies between Zawtar al-Sharqieh and Yohmor al-Shaqif.

On 27 May, an IDF soldier was killed when a drone hit a military site on the Israeli side of the border. Two other soldiers were moderately and/or severely wounded.

The IDF announced an evacuation order, demanding the entire portion of Lebanon that is south of the Zahrani river (which means a larger area than those lands that are south of the Litani river) to be evacuated.

On 27 May and 28 May, daily death tolls from Israeli strikes averaged more than 50 people per day. On 29 May, the death toll was 31 people.

On 28 May, one of the Israeli strikes hit Choueifat in the Beirut metropolitan area, resulting in a total of three deaths: a woman, her child, and another child. One of the children was of Syrian nationality. Israel said this strike was a failed assassination attempt targeting a militant commander.

On 30 May and the preceding night, and on 31 May, Hezbollah fired multiple rockets at northern Israel, although without causing injuries among civilians. Property damage was caused when one of Hezbollah's munitions struck a local shopping mall in Kiryat Shmona while it was closed at night (and because of shabbat), and beachgoers in Nahariya fled the beach as Hezbollah rockets were landing in the sea not far from the coast. Separately, a military base near Beit Hillel in Israel was attacked with a drone; after conflicting reports, the IDF said there were four wounded, all of them soldiers and all of them lightly injured.

During the night of 31 May/1 June, Hezbollah launched two UAVs from Lebanon; one fell near Israeli soldiers in Lebanon while another one crossed into Israel, and sirens were activated in the area surrounding Tiberias, Israel, as this area was thought to be the intended target; the UAV fell without causing civilian injuries.

On 30 May, an IDF soldier was killed near Zawtar al-Sharqieh. The IDF had "pushed past" Zawtar al-Sharqieh and Mayfadoun and were now heading toward Choukine. They also had occupied Yohmor. The IDF had also managed to reach the outskirts of Nabatieh.

On the morning of 31 May, the IDF captured Beaufort Castle on a strategic ridge in South Lebanon. The IDF said this was a consequence of an operation that began with a crossing of the Litani a few days earlier; the IDF shared a video of what is said was the first tank that crossed the Litani river. Benjamin Netanyahu stated that he instructed the military to "expand its ground manoeuvre in Lebanon". The BBC reported that the IDF appeared to be moving toward the city of Nabatieh and that they repeated their warning to residents that they move north of the Zahrani River.

An IDF soldier was killed in Lebanon, in or near Yohmor al-Shaqif and not far from Beaufort Castle, during the night of 31 May/1 June. Another soldier was severely wounded. Later, an IDF soldier was killed and four others moderately and/or severely wounded on 1 June. A lieutenant colonel riding in the same vehicle was lightly wounded.

Daily death tolls on 30 May, 31 May and 1 June were, respectively, 16 people, 41 people, and 21 people.

As Israel called on residents of Tyre to leave, a group of residents of Tyre issued an appeal to "sav[e] their city from the ongoing destruction caused by Israeli aggression, which has claimed dozens of its people and seeks to empty it of its residents and remove it from history". A similar appeal issued in Nabatieh was seemingly motivated by the desire to protect Beaufort Castle and other historical heritage. One signatory of the Tyre appeal publicly made the claim that more than half of Tyre has already been destroyed (this did not appear to be true, but healthcare facilities in Tyre including Hiram Hospital, the Italian Hospital and Jabal Amel Hospital were subjected to threatening airstrikes; those near Jabal Amel Hospital leveled a nearby building and damaged the hospital). The Tyre appeal calls for "strengthening the deployment of the Lebanese army and official security forces" in the city and "consolidating the presence of state institutions there in a way that protects residents", just like the similarly worded appeal issued in Nabatieh. These appeals were seen as a challenge against Hezbollah. Both appeals call for declaring the city in question an open city.

=== Fourteenth week (1–7 June) ===
On 1 June, an advisor to Parliament Speaker Berri reported: "The proposal we received [from the United States] was no Hezbollah attacks on northern Israel and that in return Israel will not bomb Beirut and then gradually the cease-fire will expand to other areas. Speaker Berri's reply was, 'Why a partial cease-fire? Let's have a full cease-fire.'"

Lebanon's embassy in the United States said Hezbollah accepted the US proposal on "mutual cessation of attacks".

Israeli prime minister Benjamin Netanyahu reportedly held a phone call with US president Donald Trump regarding a planned Israeli strike in Beirut. According to reports, Trump urged Netanyahu to cancel the operation, reportedly calling him "crazy" and stating that "everybody hates Israel because of this". Subsequent reports suggested that the operation was later called off, however, Israel continued to strike objectives in Southern Lebanon, with Israel Katz confirming that operations would continue. Hezbollah also continued to fire against Israeli positions in Southern Lebanon and Northern Israel. Following the Israeli strikes Hezbollah stated that they'd not be willing to accept a "partial ceasefire" in which Israel would continue to strike Southern Lebanon, regardless of them refraining from attacking Southern Beirut.

Daily death tolls from Israeli strikes on 2 June, 3 June and 4 June were, respectively, 35 people, 48 people and 10 people. An IDF soldier was killed on 4 June. On 5 June, another IDF soldier died in Lebanon of what is suspected to be an accidental firearm discharge; on the same day, an officer was severely wounded while a lieutenant colonel was lightly wounded. Later, an IDF soldier died on 6 June from injuries sustained in a drone attack on the evening of 4 June.

On 3 June an Israeli drone struck a highway connecting Beirut to Southern Lebanon, at the outskirts of the city. Israel said a hostile aircraft had entered its territory, which was later intercepted. On the same day, Israel and Lebanon agreed to renew a ceasefire, mediated by the US, and plan to establish "pilot zones".

On 4 June, Hezbollah rejected the deal that was reached between Lebanese and Israeli authorities in Washington D.C., demanding instead a full ceasefire combined with a full withdrawal of Israeli forces from Lebanon. Berri suggested a simultaneous withdrawal of Hezbollah and Israeli forces from the area south of the Litani, coupled with a full ceasefire.

On 5 June, Israeli ground troops made another attempt to advance toward Ghandourieh.

A Lebanese soldier and two officers, including one brigadier general, were killed by an Israeli airstrike on their vehicle along the Khardali-Nabatieh road on 6 June. The Israeli military stated that the incident is being investigated, and that the vehicle was driving in an area under evacuation orders, which requires coordination, though it did not directly accuse the Lebanese troops of not coordinating with them.

Daily death tolls from Israeli strikes on 5 June and 6 June were, respectively, 32 people and 35 people.

On 7 June, despite the previous agreement as not to strike Southern Beirut, the IDF claimed to have struck the city numerous time, claiming its targets were Hezbollah's sites. Lebanese state media said that an Israeli strike in southern suburbs of Beirut killed two people and wounded 11 others. The same day, Iran said that American bases and Israeli assets in Middle East are legitimate targets due to the American naval blockade against the country and Israeli strikes on Beirut's southern suburbs, where neighborhoods that Hezbollah members live in are located. Iran later launched ballistic missiles toward Israel. Israel said that it downed all the missiles. Iran said that it targeted Ramat David Airbase. Israel said that it will retaliate "forcefully" to the alleged Iranian violation of the truce.

=== Fifteenth week (8–14 June) ===
On 8 June, the IDF announced that it struck military sites in central and western Iran, with explosions being reported in Tehran, Isfahan, and Tabriz; at least one oil/gas facility was also struck. This triggered an exchange of strikes between the two countries. The Houthis also joined the strikes. Iran later said that it had ceased military actions against Israel. Israel later stopped Iran strikes at President Trump's request.

Daily death tolls from Israeli strikes on 7 June, 8 June and 9 June averaged 24 people per day. One particular Israeli strike on Tyre on 9 June killed eight people.

On 11 June, the IDF declared they were ready to start an offensive in Nabatieh, awaiting orders.

On 13 June, the IDF claimed to have killed multiple Hezbollah fighters during attacks on more than 70 targets in southern Lebanon over the past day.

On 14 June, the Lebanese army withdrew from Kfar Tibnit, and the IDF operated ground activities in the towns and villages surrounding Nabatieh. During a critical phase of the talks about the peace framework, Israeli strikes hit Southern Beirut, drawing American and Iranian condemnation. Israeli forces announced that they killed Ali Musa Daqduq, a senior Hezbollah commander responsible for the Karbala provincial headquarters raid that killed five American soldiers during the Iraq War in a strike in southern Lebanon over the weekend.

=== Sixteenth week (15–21 June) ===
On 15 June, Pakistan, the primary mediator, stated that both the United States and Iran declared the "immediate and permanent termination of military operations on all fronts, including in Lebanon" as part of the agreement to end the 2026 Iran war. Israel stated that its forces will remain in Lebanon. In the afternoon, Hezbollah said that it has not conducted any operations since the announcement of the agreement. One person was killed in an Israeli drone strike on a vehicle in Kfar Tibnit. Displaced people began returning home. Israeli shelling was still happening in some areas. Despite relative calm compared to previous days, there were at least two locations, one in the Tyre District (near Bayada) and another in the Nabatieh District (near Kfar Tibnit, including the Ali al-Taher heights) where Israeli forces attempted to expand their hold; after 6 p.m., Hezbollah fired weapons at tanks advancing near Kfar Tibnit, and there were repeated clashes there throughout the night. Israeli shelling hit various other areas overnight.

On 16 June, Donald Trump stated that he "was not happy" with how Israel had dealt with the Lebanon War, adding that "If Israel can't do the job without killing everyone else, Syria should do the job" in a joint military venture with the United States. He also added that this had already been suggested in the past to both Israel and Syria. Israeli strikes continued, including in Nabatieh and surrounding areas.

On 17 June, Israel attempted to capture Ali al-Taher hill, a strategic hill southeast of Nabatieh, with Hezbollah claiming to be in active combat and to have repelled various Israeli offensives in the area. Reports suggested the clashes were fierce. Following the failure of Israel to capture the hill, Hezbollah stated it destroyed three Merkava tanks and targeted troops with rocket and artillery fire.

An Israeli soldier was killed in Lebanon, and a colonel and a lieutenant colonel were both moderately wounded, with the IDF stating it occurred on 17 June.

On 18 June Israel released a map showing allegedly occupied territories in Southern Lebanon, which included most of the territories under the Yellow Line, and additionally, Kfar Tibnit and Ali al-Taher.

During the first half of 19 June and the preceding night, Israel struck numerous targets in Southern Lebanon; the death toll from Israeli strikes over a 24-hour period was 68, later updated to 83. Hezbollah struck Israeli positions within Kfar Tebnit. US president Donald Trump declared that a ceasefire mediated by the US, Qatar and Iran had been implemented between Hezbollah and Israel starting from 4 p.m. local time. Four IDF soldiers were reported killed, including a lieutenant colonel, with the IDF saying it occurred during fighting against Hezbollah in Kfar Tebnit last night. Media attributed the postponing of the physical signature of the Islamabad Memorandum in Switzerland to the clashes between Israel and Hezbollah that happened during the day. Despite the ceasefire Israel continued to strike Southern Lebanon numerous times after 4 pm.

On 20 June, Israel struck numerous locations in Lebanon, saying they were Hezbollah targets. The death toll from Israeli strikes increased by 145 people over two days. Hezbollah fired, many times, at Israeli forces stationed in Southern Lebanon. Al Jazeera called the day "devastating". The IDF announced that a soldier was killed in Lebanon. On the same day, Iran declared that it closed the Strait of Hormuz again due to Israeli strikes in Lebanon, describing them as a violation of its deal with the US. This claim was denied by the US military.

On 21 June, Benjamin Netanyahu and Israel Katz, ordered the IDF to stay put in the occupied Lebanese territories and to hold fire everywhere aside from Ali al-Taher Hill, where the IDF and Hezbollah have been involved in numerous clashes.

=== Seventeenth week (22–28 June) ===
On 24 June, the IDF reported that the Ali al-Taher ridge contained a Hezbollah underground facility built with Iranian assistance and that dozens of fighters are trapped in.

On 26 June, US secretary of state Marco Rubio announced a framework deal between Israel and Lebanon that aims to achieve "lasting peace and security" through US mediation. In the framework, Lebanon recognizes the legitimacy of Israel as a state, wishes to "formally conclude any state of war" between Lebanon and Israel, and commits to full disarmament of Hezbollah and dismantling of its infrastructure. The framework states that after full disarmament of Hezbollah and dismantling of its infrastructure is achieved, it will "enable" the IDF to progressively withdraw from Lebanon. This framework was rejected by Hezbollah.

On 28 June, Israel said its military had destroyed a Hezbollah tunnel in Majdal Zoun, stating that the 200 metres (660 ft) tunnel contained weapons and rocket launcher shafts.

=== Eighteenth week (29 June – 5 July) ===
Attacks on Lebanon continued following the peace framework.

On 30 June, Iran said that Iran, the US, and Lebanon have agreed to form a committee to oversee the end of the war.

On 2 July, the Egoz commando unit of the IDF claimed to have killed a Hezbollah fighter exiting a tunnel in the Ali al-Taher ridge area.

=== July ===
Despite Israel and Lebanon pursuing talks, Israel continued to strike locations in Southern Lebanon.

On 15 July, the US State Department stated that Israel agreed to withdraw from pilot zones in Lebanon's south. Shortly after, Israeli military said that it killed three Hezbollah members in the area of Beit Yahoun.

On 20 July, the US announced that Israel handed over sections of the buffer zone occupied by it in southern Lebanon to the Lebanese government as per its U.S.-mediated deal with Beirut.

On 21 July, Lebanon announced that Lebanese army started deploying in Zawtar al-Gharbiyeh following Israeli withdrawal from the town in accordance with a US mediated agreement.

=== August ===
On 5 August, the IDF reported the deaths of two soldiers, one of them holding the rank of major (res.) Later in the day, Israel carried out retaliatory attacks that left one dead and twelve wounded in the village of Tibnin.

On 7 August, Lebanon and Israel agreed on a shortlist of states that could send forces to verify Hezbollah disarmament.

On 8 August, IDF forces re-entered Zawtar al-Gharbiyah in violation of the U.S.-brokered agreement. Separately, the Lebanese military reported that three soldiers where wounded disarming an IED in Zawtar al-Gharbiyah.

On 11 August, an Israeli drone strike hit vehicles belonging to the Islamic Health Authority and Islamic Message Scouts Association on the outskirts of Nabatieh.

On 12 August Israel performed strikes on Nabatieh and Al-Mansouri in violation of the U.S.-brokered agreement and accidentally targeted IDF soldiers with an interceptor rocket with no casualties.

On 15 August Hezbollah performed a drone strike on IDF forces at the Ali Taher Ridge area seriously wounding an officer and two soldiers from the Yahalom combat engineering unit.

On 19 August Israel performed retaliatory strikes on the Ali Taher Ridge and Kfar Rumman.

On 20 August Israel performed both air and artillery strikes on Houla, Markaba, Wadi Slouqi, Qabrikha, al-Mansouri, Majdalzoun, Ali al-Taher and Touline while the IDF performed demolitions in Zawtar al-Sharqiyeh, Majdalzoun, al-Mansouri and al-Khiam, also in retaliation for the 15 August strike.

During the night of 22 August into the early morning of 23 August Israel launched significant areal bombardments of the Ali Taher Ridge and surrounding woods and villages with a military spokesmen stating that they "targeted vehicles approaching Ali Taher or traveling nearby" followed by strikes on the villages of Zawtar al-Sharqieh and Yohmor al-Shaqif near Nabatieh while the IDF demolished homes in Kfar Tebnit and Arnoun.

On 24 August IDF forces advanced beyond the 'yellow line' established by the U.S.-brokered agreement and entered the town of Haris with bulldozers while the IDF continued demolitions in Khiam, Taybeh, Mays Al Jebel and Yohmor.

On 25 August the IDF attacked Tel al-Dabsha, Dahiyat Kafr Rumman and the al-Deir neighborhood in al-Nabatiyeh al-Fawqa to further isolate the Ali Taher Ridge. Additional strikes where also reported near Mansouri.

On 26 August Hezbollah launched two more drone strikes on IDF personnel near the Ali Taher Ridge with the IDF shooting down one, while the other caused no casualties.

On 27 August the IDF performed retaliatory strikes around Nabatieh that included a strike on Arabsalim that killed a woman who had been married just 48 hours prior.

=== September ===
On 3 September, the Israeli government announced it had taken control of Ali Taher hill and had gained "operational control" of the ridge, with Defense Minister Israel Katz stating that the IDF was working to destroy the network of tunnels underneath it to stop future reuse by Hezbollah and that Israeli control of the ridge was part of a "security zone in southern Lebanon" that it was establishing. In the days after the announcement, a visiting Associated Press photographer was unable to find any IDF presence on the hill. Hezbollah legislator Ihab Hamadeh expressed doubt, noting that Israel would not need to continually attack the hill if it already controlled it. On 10 September 2026, the IDF said that it had detonated more than 1,000 tons of TNT (4,200 GJ) of explosives, destroying the network of tunnels stretching 2 kilometres (1.2 mi) underneath the ridge and setting off tremors that measured 4.1 on the Richter scale in what Lebanon's National News Agency called a "massive explosion".

Hezbollah has consistently rejected handing over control of Ali Taher to the Lebanese military out of concern that Israel would take it and use it as a bargaining chip to take control of more territory.

Seven people were killed on 5 September. The next day, an Israeli strike on a residential building in the southern Lebanese town of Kfar Reman killed 12 members of the same family, including at least two children and four women. Another strike killed a paramedic.

=== October ===
On 3 October the IDF targeted a private school in Houla with demolition charges while several homes where also burned. Israeli shelling was also reported in Mansouri, Majdal Zoun, Khaim, Tallouseh, Mayfadoun and Zawtar al-Sharqiyah while airstrikes where reported in Bani Hayyan and Kfar Tibni.

On 8 October the IDF announced that Captain Eliav Haim Tzapalamus of the 603rd Battalion, 7th Brigade was killed when his humvee flipped along the Litani River while the three other passengers where lightly injured. The IDF described this as "f[a]ll[ing] in battle in southern Lebanon."

== Economic targets ==
Israel's efforts against Hezbollah have focused on its military assets as well as its finances, with an emphasis on the estimated $700 million directed from Iran each year through intermediaries that accounted for most of Hezbollah's annual operating budget. Some of the earliest Israeli military efforts in March 2026 targeted the organization's supply of gold and foreign currency, as well as branches of the Al-Qard Al-Hasan Association, a non-profit financial institution that has been described as being "Hezbollah's bank in Lebanon". Money changing offices and gas stations were also struck, all as part of an effort to squeeze the organization's sources of funding.

== Diplomatic efforts ==
On 9 April, it was reported that a round of negotiations between Israel and Lebanon has been scheduled to take place in Washington, D.C., United States. The talks will involve the US ambassador to Lebanon Michel Issa, Israeli ambassador to the US Yechiel Leiter, and Lebanese ambassador to the US Nada Hamadeh Moawad. However, Israeli officials rejected a ceasefire with Hezbollah in Lebanon ahead of the talks, which was confirmed on 10 April by Prime Minister Benjamin Netanyahu. On 12 April, Lebanese prime minister Nawaf Salam said that his government is "working to end this war, secure the Israeli withdrawal from all our territory, and secure the return of all our prisoners." The first talks between the two governments in decades occurred on 14 April in the presence of secretary of state Marco Rubio.

As US efforts to convince the Israeli government to refrain from further attacks in Lebanon failed, the governments of the US, Iran and Pakistan agreed on 21 June to create a joint mechanism of consultation in order to resolve this issue.

On 26 June, a direct framework agreement between Israel and Lebanon was signed in Washington, D.C. in order to obtain Israeli withdrawal from all parts of Lebanon, to be carried out in parallel with the dismantling of Hezbollah through the efforts of the Lebanese army. Israel stated that this agreement superseded the prior discussions involving Iran.

== Impact and casualties ==
=== Casualties ===
As of 20 June, at least 4,057 people have been killed and 12,121 wounded by Israeli strikes in Lebanon during the war. Internal Hezbollah sources said that over 1,000 Hezbollah fighters had been killed in the war while the Israel Defense Forces (IDF) said that it had killed 1,700 fighters.

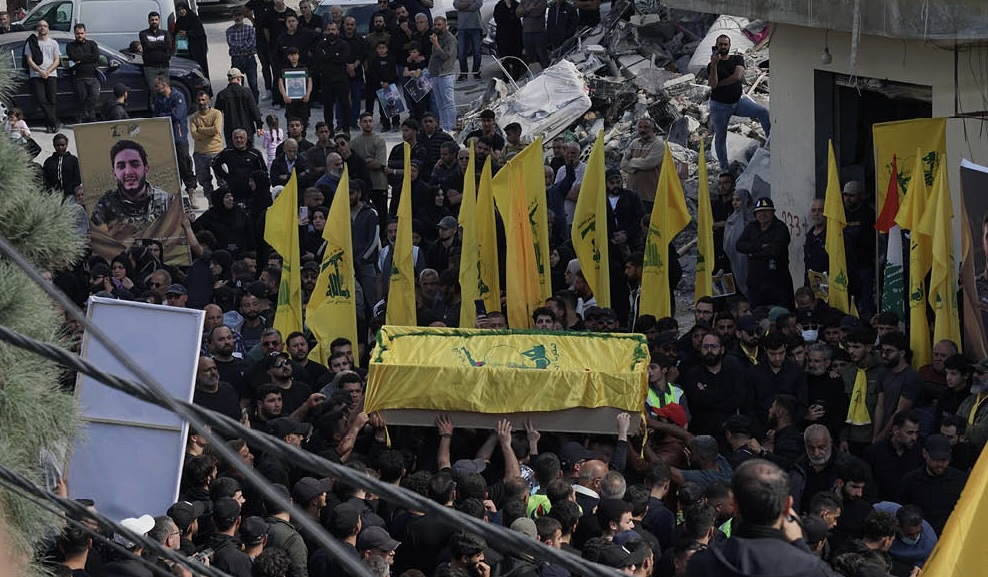
Funerary procession in Tyre for a deceased Hezbollah fighter, 21 April 2026

On 2 March, the first day of the war, Lebanon's Health Ministry reported that at least 31 people had been killed and 149 injured in the initial Israeli strikes, including 20 killed and 91 wounded in Beirut's southern suburbs and 11 killed and 58 wounded in southern Lebanon. Civilian displacement became significant, with families fleeing southern areas toward cities like Sidon. In the afternoon, the IDF announced that Hussein Makled, head of Hezbollah's intelligence headquarters, had been killed in overnight strikes in Beirut. Local media also reported the death of the brother of the late Mohammad Hussein Fadlallah along with his wife as a result of strikes in Haret Hreik. Palestinian Islamic Jihad in Lebanon announced that its commander, Adham Adnan al-Othman, had been killed in Beirut's southern suburbs. At night, casualties rose to 52 deaths and 154 injuries, according to the Health Ministry.

On 8 April, shortly after the United States and Iran agreed to a two-week ceasefire and Hezbollah signaled that it would pause its attacks on Israel accordingly, Israel launched what it described as its "most powerful attacks" on Lebanon, killing at least 357 people. The casualty count was among the highest of the war.

The percentage of women and children among those killed, overall lower than in the Gaza War, changed over time. During the first twenty days of the war, 1 out of 9 people killed by Israeli actions in Lebanon was a child. The percentage of children among those killed decreased during the later stages of the war.

=== Displacement ===
According to Lebanon, over 1.2 million Lebanese nationals, corresponding to more than one-sixth of the country's population, were displaced. Israel used heavy machinery to destroy Lebanese villages and civilian infrastructure south of the Litani River in an effort to prevent the return of civilians. Over 40,000 homes in southern Lebanon have been destroyed. Israel's evacuation orders in Lebanon covered an area of over 1,470 square kilometres (570 sq mi), encompassing 14% of the country's territory. The displacement in Lebanon has been called one of the most severe and fastest-growing refugee crises worldwide. The war exacerbated the economic and humanitarian problems that have been ongoing in Lebanon since the 2019 financial crisis and 2020 Beirut explosion. In May 2026, Reuters reported that Israeli issued evacuation orders "span about 2,000 km^{2} of Lebanon – about a fifth of the entire country".

The number of displaced people remained around 500,000 as of early July 2026.

=== Demolitions ===
Multiple Lebanese villages adjacent to the border were already destroyed by Israel in 2024 by shelling and controlled demolitions.

During the 2026 war, Israel conducted a large-scale campaign of controlled demolitions of homes and other civilian buildings, including in larger towns. The central part of Bint Jbeil was completely razed, mostly during April 2026. According to a study by Le Monde between 28 February and 29 April 2026, 45% of urban areas located in the Yellow Line are destroyed or damaged by the Israeli army.

According to the United Nations High Commissioner for Refugees, “The issuance of blanket evacuation orders, combined with the destruction of urban and village housing that displaced persons would have returned to, is consistent with the pattern of domicide that was initiated during the genocide in Gaza.”

=== Return migration of Syrian refugees ===
According to the Office of the United Nations High Commissioner for Refugees, the total population of Syrian refugees in the entirety of Lebanon was 1.4 million people in March. Due to the war, thousands of individuals of Syrian heritage migrated back to Syria, especially by using the Joussieh border crossing. According to a 13 March report by Intersos, other local agencies had recorded as of 10 March that 85,000 to 90,000 people had crossed the main legal border crossings from Lebanon to Syria. Demographically, these refugees comprised 93% Syrian returnees and 7% Lebanese citizens. More than 125,000 people had crossed the border from Lebanon into Syria by 18 March; according to the United Nations High Commissioner for Refugees's Displacement Tracking Matrix, 119,000 of them were Syrians. By 31 March 2026 up to 200,000 people had crossed the Lebanese border into Syria, around 180,000 of which being Syrians and 28,000 Lebanese. By 2 May 2026 the total amount of Syrians that had crossed the Lebanese border into Syria were 306,888 alongside 64,865 Lebanese. In August 2026, Lebanese Minister of Interior and Municipalities Ahmad al-Hajjar stated that out of the 1.4 million former Syrian refugee population around 650,000 refugees had been removed from the UNHCR database after their return to Syria, adding that "measures facilitating the voluntary return of Syrian refugees" by the Lebanese government had been extended to up until 30 September 2026.

== Reactions ==
=== Lebanese government ===
On 2 March 2026, Lebanese prime minister Nawaf Salam condemned Hezbollah's rocket and drone strikes from southern Lebanon, calling them irresponsible acts outside the authority of the Lebanese state that endanger national security. While he emphasized that all military action must fall under the government's control, he did not formally declare Hezbollah outlawed, focusing instead on preventing unauthorized armed operations.

Following an emergency Cabinet meeting convened early in the day amid the escalating strikes, Salam announced a total ban on all military activities by Hezbollah, demanding the group surrender its weapons to the state and restrict itself to political activities only. He affirmed that decisions on war and peace rest exclusively with the state, rejecting any unauthorized actions from Lebanese territory, and called on security forces to prevent such violations and arrest those responsible.

The National News Agency reported that justice minister Adel Nassar requested the public prosecutor at the Court of Cassation, Jamal Hajjar, and the government commissioner at the Military Court to assign the security forces with immediately arresting those involved in launching rockets from southern Lebanon toward Israel.

The Lebanese government announced on 5 March it would "arrest and repatriate" anyone in Lebanon connected to Iran's Revolutionary Guards, leading to the departure of dozens of Iranian officers from Beirut in the past two days, according to Axios and several other sources. Most of those departing are believed to be members of the Quds Force who had been serving as military advisers to Hezbollah and influencing its operations.

Following the Lebanese legal actions against Hezbollah and the IRGC, more than 150 Iranian nationals left Lebanon, including diplomats.

President Joseph Aoun said the state is the only one that can protect its citizens and that no one expected that the country once again to become the arena for the wars of others. Minister of Information Paul Morkos has ordered all media (television, radio and the national news agency) to stop using the word "resistance" affiliated to Hezbollah, meaning they are not to call them by that name anymore.

On 9 March 2026, the Parliament of Lebanon postponed parliamentary elections from May 2026 to May 2028.

In a 22 March 2026 interview to Saudi Arabia's Al-Hadath television station, Salam said the Iranian IRGC is directing Hezbollah in its war on Israel and that this war was imposed on Lebanon. "These were the Revolutionary Guards, who are present and, unfortunately, managing military operations in Lebanon ...These people have fake passports and entered the country illegally". He mentioned again the government's unprecedented decision to ban Hezbollah's military actions, calling them to disarm and hand their weapons to the state.

On 24 March 2026, the Lebanese government declared it was expelling the Iranian ambassador, Mohammad Reza Raouf Sheibani, in response to Iran's continued interference in Lebanon's internal affairs.

=== Hezbollah ===
Hezbollah condemned the Lebanese government after it banned Hezbollah's military and security activities, stating "We understand the Lebanese government's impotence in the face of the brutal Zionist enemy, which violates national sovereignty, occupies land, and poses a continuous threat to the country's security and stability", and that it is the government's right "to decide on war and peace", concluding that "given this clear weakness and deficiency, we see no justification for Prime Minister Salam and his government to take such aggressive measures against the Lebanese who reject the occupation." Hezbollah later said that its attack was a "defensive act" after over a year of Israeli attacks despite a truce. It added that "for fifteen months, Israeli aggression against Lebanon has continued through killing, destruction, bulldozing, and all forms of criminal acts."

Group members have openly threatened to topple the government. Wafiq Safa vowed that Hezbollah would force the government to retract its ban on their military activities "regardless of the method". He further threatened a "different agenda" after the war, including a potential return to the street-level violence seen in the May 2008 clashes. The deputy head of Hezbollah's political council, Mahmoud Qamati, warned that the group is "capable of turning the country and government upside down". He explicitly labeled the government "traitors" and "complicit," comparing them to the Vichy regime and stating that a post-war confrontation is "inevitable". Hezbollah official Nawwaf Moussawi, compared Aoun to Anwar Sadat who was a former Egyptian president that signed a peace agreement with Israel at the Camp David Accords resulting in his assassination in 1981, adding that any peace deal with Israel would be "rejected, unrecognized and thrown in the trash, like the May 17, 1983 agreement."

=== Other domestic political parties ===
Many of Lebanon's other political parties have expressed dismay with Hezbollah's actions and have urged the Lebanese government to disarm the party.

Samir Geagea, chairman of the LF, has been the most prominent critic, calling Hezbollah's demands for the government to retract its decisions "completely unacceptable". He accused the group of taking the state hostage for 40 years and dragging Lebanon into an "insane" war to serve Iranian interests rather than national ones. The Kataeb Party leader Samy Gemayel stated that Hezbollah's "Sick mindset" dragged Lebanon into a "free suicide" operation.

Beirut MP Fouad Makhzoumi called for a total ban on Hezbollah activities stressing state monopoly on arms and advocated the deployment of the army to the southern suburbs.

In a meeting between Lebanese Christian representatives and Emmanuel Macron, the Lebanese Forces party went as far as to suggest rearming its party militia to make up for the Lebanese government's perceived inaction in disarmament.

=== Israel ===
The IDF said that it would "not allow [Hezbollah] to pose a threat to the State of Israel and harm the residents of the north", further accusing it of "destroying the state of Lebanon." IDF spokesperson Effie Defrin said "Hezbollah opened fire last night. We warned it. It will pay a heavy price." When asked about a possible ground incursion into Lebanon, Defrin stated "all options are on the table." Israel also indirectly threatened to strike Lebanese government targets unless it intervened against Hezbollah. Lebanese foreign minister Youssef Rajji said that Lebanon had "received warnings indicating that any intervention on the part of Hezbollah could prompt Israel to strike infrastructure targets."

=== International ===
France condemned Hezbollah's attacks against Israel as "irresponsible" and expressed its solidarity "in the face of the ordeal Lebanon is going through due to the irresponsible decision of Hezbollah". It also expressed solidarity with Israeli civilians affected by the Iranian attacks.

Syrian president Ahmed al-Sharaa said that he supports the Lebanese government's efforts to disarm Hezbollah. Syria also warned that it would respond to any attack on its territory, after accusing Hezbollah of targeting Syrian Army positions and moving forces to the border.

United States president Donald Trump said "Hezbollah is a big problem" and "they're rapidly being eliminated" in response to Israel's ground offensive in southern Lebanon, adding that he spoke to Israeli leaders about the offensive. US ambassador to the United Nations Mike Waltz said that the US strongly condemns attacks by Hezbollah against Israel and supports Israel's right to defend itself. He further described Hezbollah as an Iranian proxy that does not represent the interests of the Lebanese people and commended the Lebanese government's decision to ban its military activities.

Spain "strongly condemned" the Israeli attacks on Lebanon, and urged full compliance with UN Security Council Resolution 1701. Turkey also condemned the Israeli ground operation in Lebanon, calling it one of the "genocidal and collective punishment policies, this time in Lebanon," of the Netanyahu government, and warned against "another humanitarian catastrophe."

In a joint statement, France, Canada, Germany, Italy, and the United Kingdom expressed that they were "gravely concerned" at the violence in Lebanon and called for "immediate de-escalation." They jointly condemned Hezbollah's "decision to join Iran in hostilities" and also called for the proposed Israeli ground invasion of Lebanon to "be averted" as it could trigger "devastating humanitarian consequences and could lead to a protracted conflict." Canadian prime minister Mark Carney condemned what he called the "illegal invasion" of Lebanon by Israel, calling it "a violation of [Lebanon's] territorial sovereignty" and noting that the Lebanese government has made efforts to ban Hezbollah's activities.

Brazil condemned 8 April 2026 Israeli attacks in Lebanon as a breach of the April 2026 ceasefire, demanding that Israel suspend military operations and respect Lebanon's territorial integrity. Russia condemned Israel's post-ceasefire strikes in Lebanon, as well as attacks on journalists and UNIFIL peacekeepers, and called on Israel to "abandon the use of force alone to address its legitimate security concerns, withdraw its military units from occupied territories, and return to the path of diplomacy." Following Israel's 8 April strikes, China's Foreign Ministry issued a statement that Lebanon's sovereignty should not be violated.

Ahead of peace talks in Islamabad between US and Iran on the 2026 Iran war, Pakistan opposed Israel's military actions in Lebanon, stating that the terms of truce between Iran and the US and Israel included Lebanon. Both Tel Aviv and Washington denied Pakistan's claims. Pakistan's Defense Minister Khawaja Asif reacted by labeling Israel as "evil" and a "curse for humanity." Netanyahu's office responded by stating that such remarks amounted to calling for Israel's destruction and called Asif's statements "outrageous." "This is not a statement that can be tolerated from any government, especially not from one that claims to be a neutral arbiter for peace," the statement read.

== See also ==
- 1982 Lebanon War
- Israeli occupation of Southern Lebanon (1982–2000)
- Operation Accountability
- Operation Grapes of Wrath
- 2006 Lebanon war
- April 2023 Palestinian rocket attacks on Israel
- Hamas in Lebanon
- Hezbollah armed strength
- Hezbollah–Syria clashes (2024–present)
- Lebanese displacement during the Israel–Hezbollah conflict (2023–present)
- Outline of the Gaza war
- Palestinian insurgency in South Lebanon
- 2026 Yemen offensives

=== Lists ===
- List of modern conflicts in the Middle East
- List of wars involving Israel
- List of extrajudicial killings and political violence in Lebanon
- List of wars involving Lebanon
