= List of engagements during the 2026 Lebanon War =

This is a list of engagements during the 2026 Lebanon War:

== Battles ==
Military situation

Name	Location	Start date	End date	Result of the battle
Battle of Khiam (2026)	Al-Khiyam, Lebanon	4 March 2026	c. 24 May 2026	Israeli victory: Town is occupied and depopulated.
Battle of Bint Jbeil (2026)	Bint Jbeil, Lebanon	9 April 2026	Before 12 May 2026	Israeli victory: ~90% of urban area destroyed or severely damaged and 3,000 housing units leveled according to Al Jazeera satellite analysis, 28 April 2026; Systematic destruction of the town continues following the battle.
2026 Israeli crossing of the Litani River	Litani River and Zawtar al-Sharqiyah, Lebanon	c. 2 May 2026	12 May 2026	Israeli victory: The Northern-Western bank of the Litani River falls under Israeli occupation; The outskirts of Zawtar al-Sharqiyah are occupied by the IDF
Battle of Haddatha	Haddatha, Lebanon	19 May 2026	21 May 2026 (Note: Last recorded military action in the area)	Hezbollah victory: Incursion repealed by Hezbollah, leading to withdrawal. (Note: The Amit Terrorism and Intelligence Research Institute contests that the "battle" is just a "propaganda effort" by Hezbollah.)
Battle of Zawtar al-Sharqiyah	Zawtar al-Sharqiyah, Zawtar al-Gharbiyah, and Beaufort Castle, Lebanon	27 May 2026	31 May 2026	Israeli victory: Zawtar al-Sharqiyah, Yohmor and other nearby towns occupied by the IDF; Capture of Beaufort Castle
Siege of Ali al-Taher	Ali al-Taher, Lebanon	3 September 2026	3 September 2026	Israeli victory: Israel declared "operational control" of the complex on 3 September 2026
