= Israeli Security Zone =

Israeli Security Zone may refer to:

- Israeli occupation of Southern Lebanon (2026), "Security Zone" as part of the 2026 Lebanon war
- The Israeli occupation of Southern Lebanon (1982–2000) following the creation of the Free Lebanon State
- Philadelphi Route, a narrow strip of land between Gaza Strip and Egypt
- The Gaza envelope
- The Seam zone
