= Siege of Ali al-Taher =

2026 Israeli siege of a Hezbollah underground complex in southern Lebanon

- Part of the 2026 Lebanon war and the 2026 Iran war
- Date: 3 September 2026
- Location: Ali al-Taher, near Nabatieh, southern Lebanon
- Caused by: Israeli campaign to seize and dismantle a major Hezbollah underground command and weapons complex
- Goals: Capture and neutralisation of Hezbollah's underground complex beneath the Ali al-Taher ridge
- Methods: Encirclement, precision airstrikes and artillery on supply routes, small-unit raids, tunnel-clearing operations
- Status: Concluded; Israel declared "operational control" of the complex on 3 September 2026

Parties
Israel	Hezbollah; Iran

Units involved
Israeli Ground Forces; 36th Division; Oz Brigade	Hezbollah military; Radwan Force; Badr Unit (Note: The Israeli ALMA Research and Education Center, back in March 2026, defined Hezbollah's Badr Unit as the one responsible for military activities and the security area north of the Litani toward the city of Sidon.); Iran; Islamic Revolutionary Guard Corps

Casualties and losses
	More than 20 killed (Hezbollah); an unknown number of Hezbollah fighters and Revolutionary Guards "advisers" trapped or besieged underground

The siege of Ali al-Taher was an Israeli military operation to encircle, besiege and ultimately seize and destroy a major underground Hezbollah complex beneath the Ali al-Taher ridge near Nabatieh in southern Lebanon, part of the wider 2026 Lebanon war. Israeli forces surrounded the ridge in a rapid advance around ten weeks before the operation concluded, trapping an estimated several dozen Hezbollah fighters and Islamic Revolutionary Guard Corps (IRGC) "advisers" inside a network of tunnels the group had spent about two decades constructing beneath the hills. On 3 September 2026, Israel declared "operational control" of the complex after weeks of fighting, a development Hezbollah neither confirmed nor denied.

== Context ==
Named after a Shi'ite Muslim scholar whose shrine sits at its summit, the Ali al-Taher ridge rises about 600 metres (2,000 ft) above the Litani River and commands sweeping views over southeastern Lebanon, including Nabatieh, the Iqlim al-Tuffah region and the approaches to the Western Bekaa. Israel had held the ridge during its 22-year occupation of south Lebanon that ended in 2000. Hezbollah is believed to have spent roughly 20 years constructing a subterranean complex beneath the ridge, including command centres, weapons depots and missile facilities, which allowed the group to operate drones and missiles while sheltering fighters from air attack; Israeli chief of staff Lt. Gen. Eyal Zamir described it on 21 June 2026 as "an underground military fortress". Some analysts described the site as Iran's "second front" against Israel.

Ali al-Taher lies near Zawtar al-Gharbiyah, a town from which Israeli troops had withdrawn in July 2026 as part of a US-brokered roadmap under which Israeli forces would gradually withdraw from southern Lebanon as the Lebanese Armed Forces (LAF) disarmed Hezbollah; with Hezbollah refusing to give up its weapons, that plan had stalled. The Israel Defense Forces (IDF) sent units from its 36th Division to seize the outskirts of Nabatieh and the Ali al-Taher ridge while simultaneously clearing the nearby Beaufort Castle; the rapid advance, based on detailed intelligence about the underground headquarters, caught Hezbollah unprepared, and troops from the Egoz Unit and the Yahalom Unit combat engineering unit surrounded several tunnel shafts before Hezbollah's men inside could escape.

== Siege ==
=== Prelude ===
Israeli prime minister Benjamin Netanyahu said on 31 August 2026 that Israel was "in the midst of a very important operation" without elaborating. On the same day, Al-Jadeed reported that the IDF was "applying pressure" through gunfire near the entrance of Ali al-Taher, though a direct occupation had not yet been approved. A retired Lebanese army general, Khaled Hamade, said that "once the Americans give their approval, Ali al-Taher will be the next target of an Israeli operation," while another retired general, Said Kozah, said whoever controlled the ridge and surrounding heights controlled the wider area through firepower and surveillance.

=== Execution ===
Following the encirclement, Israel tightened its siege of the underground complex over roughly ten weeks. The IDF systematically targeted Hezbollah's supply routes to the complex with precision airstrikes and artillery, seeking to choke off reinforcements, ration the defenders' resources and prevent personnel rotation, according to a former military official. Israeli small-unit raids and probing attacks tested Hezbollah's perimeter, while the IDF mapped tunnel entrances, weapons caches and defensive emplacements, and special operations units supported by electronic warfare targeted Hezbollah's communication nodes. Lebanese media reported that Israeli forces used robots and remotely controlled vehicles during incursions into the hills to conduct reconnaissance without exposing soldiers to fire, and located several tunnel entrances leading into the complex.

Hezbollah fighters and Revolutionary Guards personnel made numerous attempts to break out of the complex or to bring in supplies and reinforcements from villages on the Nabatieh plateau, including through newly dug shafts, and the group claimed it had succeeded in bringing in water, food and reinforcements. Fighting arising from these attempts and from drone attacks killed five Israeli soldiers and officers and wounded 21 others, while Hezbollah lost more than 20 men. Media estimates, including from outlets close to Hezbollah such as Al Arabiya, put the number of Hezbollah fighters trapped underground at between 20 and 40, alongside several dozen IRGC officers who had arrived over the preceding year to serve at the underground command centre for the combat sector north of the Litani River.

Analysts said Israel deliberately avoided the more aggressive tunnel-clearing tactics it had used in Gaza and southern Lebanon elsewhere, out of concern that a bloodbath involving IRGC personnel could prompt Tehran to retaliate against Israel and the United States and risk wider regional escalation, including against US bases and Gulf Arab states.

Parallel to the fighting, US-mediated negotiations between Lebanon and Israel sought a comprehensive arrangement in which Hezbollah and Israel would both withdraw from the ridge and the LAF would take control and demilitarise the site above and below ground, with Israeli forces withdrawing only after weapons were collected and the tunnels rendered unusable; the talks remained deadlocked, as Hezbollah was expected to resist disarming and to demand a simultaneous rather than sequential withdrawal.

== Conclusion ==
On 3 September 2026, Israel declared it had achieved "operational control" of the Ali al-Taher complex after weeks of fighting. Defense Minister Israel Katz stated that the Israeli control of the ridge was part of a "security zone in southern Lebanon" that it was establishing. Retired LAF general Fadi Daoud said the fall of Ali al-Taher marked "the collapse of the final defensive line protecting Hezbollah's last major stronghold in Iqlim al-Tuffah," and also meant the loss of the shield for Jabal al-Rihane, exposing Hezbollah's rear area. Hezbollah did not acknowledge or deny the loss, which analysts said reflected concern over undermining years of propaganda about its capabilities.

On 10 September 2026, the IDF said that it had detonated more than 1,000 tons of TNT (4,200 GJ) of explosives, destroying the network of tunnels stretching 2 kilometres (1.2 mi) underneath the ridge and setting off tremors that measured 4.1 on the Richter scale in what Lebanon's National News Agency called a "massive explosion".

== Reactions and analysis ==
A US official told This Is Beirut that Iran sought "to preserve deterrence and protect the credibility of its regional network without necessarily embracing an escalatory sequence it cannot fully control," while a US State Department spokesperson said Hezbollah was "simply taking orders from Iran". A US diplomatic source said the LAF had "no plan whatsoever on disarmament," reflecting broader paralysis in Lebanese state efforts to assert authority over Hezbollah's weapons. Assaf Orion, a fellow at the Washington Institute, called the underlying US-brokered framework "a real chance to break the destructive cycle," but said its success depended on whether the LAF could enforce state authority and dismantle Hezbollah's military infrastructure. Former US Assistant Secretary of State David Schenker said Hezbollah was "unwilling to hand over any facility to the Lebanese military, likely to avoid setting a precedent".

Analysts noted that Israel's approach to the ridge was also shaped by domestic political considerations ahead of Israeli elections planned for October 2026; strategic communications expert Andrea Tenenti, a former UNIFIL spokesperson, said "before the elections, Israel needs a big win in an area that has always been seen as a Hezbollah stronghold," while Lebanese analyst and retired general Hassan Jouni said Israel might nonetheless prefer a slow siege to avoid Israeli troop casualties.

Other assessments emphasised the ridge's military function rather than its political symbolism. FDD's Long War Journal described the site as a command hub for Hezbollah's Badr Unit, covering the area from Nabatieh toward Sidon and the Awali River, and reported that the underground complex contained command and weapons rooms, generators, living quarters and a kitchen, and took Israeli forces weeks to clear. The same outlet cautioned that Israeli claims about the operation, including a Maariv report that troops recovered fifteen bodies from the tunnels, remained independently unconfirmed. Following the demolition, it reported the IDF's characterisation of the facility as the "nerve center" of the Badr Unit, and Israeli chief of staff Effie Defrin's statement that Hezbollah had used it to direct fighting in 2024 and again from March 2026.

Commentary also noted that the impasse over the ridge was not solely an Israeli choice. During US-mediated negotiations Washington proposed that the Lebanese Armed Forces take control of the site, a proposal Hezbollah rejected, according to a source close to the talks.

== See also ==
- 2026 Israeli crossing of the Litani River
