= Israeli occupation of Southern Lebanon =

Israeli occupation of Southern Lebanon may refer to:

- Israeli occupation of Southern Lebanon (1982–2000)
- Israeli occupation of Southern Lebanon (2026)
