= Battle of Haddatha =

Battle during the 2026 Lebanon War

- Part of 2026 Lebanon War and 2026 Iran War
Date	19–21 May 2026 (Note: Last recorded military action in the area) (3 days)
Location	Haddatha, Lebanon
Result	Hezbollah victory: Incursion repelled by Hezbollah, leading to withdrawal (Note: The Amit Terrorism and Intelligence Research Institute contests that the "battle" is just a "propaganda effort" by Hezbollah.)

Belligerents
Israel	Hezbollah

Commanders and leaders
Meir Biderman (WIA)	Unknown

Units involved
Israel Defense Forces; Israeli Ground Forces; 401st Brigade; 601st Battalion; Israeli Air Force	Hezbollah military; Local garrison; Radwan Force

Casualties and losses
4 wounded operatives	Unknown

The Battle of Haddatha was a battle between Israel and Hezbollah that started on 19 May 2026 during the 2026 Lebanon War in the village of Haddatha. The battle occurred during the 2026 Israel–Lebanon ceasefire and was notable for taking place in a village located beyond the "yellow line" established by Israel earlier in the conflict.

== Significance ==
The Institute for the Study of War noted how the battle was the "first prolonged engagement between the IDF and Hezbollah since the ceasefire began".

L'Orient–Le Jour argued that the Israeli Defense Forces wanted to secure the village of Haddatha to pave the way toward an offensive on Tyre.

== Background ==
=== Start of hostilities ===
At the start of the 2026 Iran war, U.S. and Israeli strikes killed Iran's Supreme Leader, Ali Khamenei. Following Iranian confirmation of Khamenei's death on 1 March, Hezbollah Secretary-General Naim Qassem vowed to retaliate and "undertake our duty of confronting the aggression", stating that Hezbollah would not leave "the field of honour and resistance".

On 2 March, Hezbollah launched several projectiles into northern Israel, its first such attack since the 2024 ceasefire, targeting a missile defence site near Haifa. The group described the attack as a "defensive act" aimed at forcing Israel to halt its operations in Lebanon and withdraw from occupied areas, stating it was unrelated to the Iran war.

The Israel Defense Forces (IDF) said one projectile was intercepted while others landed in open areas. In response, Israel carried out overnight airstrikes in Beirut and across southern Lebanon, killing hundreds of civilians and issuing evacuation orders for dozens of communities. The IDF claimed the strikes targeted senior Hezbollah figures and infrastructure; it later reported killing Hezbollah intelligence chief Hussain Makled, while early reports suggested other senior leaders may also have been targeted.

=== Iran war ceasefire and Lebanon war ceasefire ===
Pakistan mediated the 2026 Iran war ceasefire and said Lebanon was included in the ceasefire, temporarily halting the 2026 Iran war for two weeks. Shortly after, Israeli prime minister Benjamin Netanyahu denied that was the case alongside U.S. President Donald Trump. On the contrary Pakistan and Iran insisted that Lebanon was included in the ceasefire alongside other nations such as France and Egypt.

Israel soon after initiated Operation Eternal Darkness and struck various sites in Lebanon in what were defined as the largest attacks since the start of the entire war. What followed was "Operation Silver Plow", which was announced by Israel Katz and led to the occupation of various villages in Southern Lebanon and the Battle of Bint Jbeil.

Following the 2026 Israel–Lebanon ceasefire, Israeli demolitions and military operations still persisted, with both sides insisting that there was objectively no ceasefire. Additionally, following the ceasefire, Israel declared the creation of a "Yellow Line" in Southern Lebanon akin to that in Gaza. The "yellow line" however did not include the village of Haddatha.

== Battle ==
=== 19 May ===
The very first report of the IDF attempt to advance toward the village of Haddatha was recorded. According to the report the Israeli Defense Forces attempted to reach the town's square with the use of medium weapons and rockets, coming into direct confrontation with Hezbollah militants starting from 10:15 p.m local time.

=== 20 May ===
Clashes that had started the prior day between Hezbollah militias and IDF continued, with Israel allegedly pursuing the use of unidentified fighter jets, drones, concentrated artillery shelling, explosives, bulldozers and engineering vehicles in order to destroy the town's defenses and also reach the main square of the village. Hezbollah claimed that Israel had sent numerous "rescue teams" as to retrieve their soldiers from the battleground and also operatives as to locate and dismantle military infrastructures allegedly used by the Radwan Forces. Following the clashes Hezbollah claimed that they had inflicted casualties, including the destruction of four Merkava tanks, forcing the IDF to retreat to the nearby town of Rashaf which they had occupied. Following Hezbollah's counterstrikes in the nearby villages and towns, the commander of the 401st Brigade, Meir Biderman, a photographer from the IDF Spokesperson's Unit, a soldier from the 601st Battalion and another official were wounded whilst on duty in the nearby town of Debel and in the area of the village itself.

At 16:50 local time, Hezbollah claimed to have used drones to strike a gathering of Israeli army vehicles and soldiers in the village.

=== 21 May ===
In response to the alleged attempted Israeli advances, Hezbollah targeted Israeli positions in the occupied towns of Debel and Rashaf between midnight and 2 a.m. (local time), using successive waves of rockets and suicide drones against local patrols and positions. Israeli strikes during the night resulted in the death of four members of the Islamic Health Authority and the injury of another two members.

On the same day Abu Ali Express, an outlet tied to the IDF, stated that "Hezbollah also admitted today (21 May) for the first time that IDF forces [were] right inside the village of Hadatha and not just on its outskirts or at the entrance to it". In the early hours Hezbollah alleged to have struck a gathering of Israeli vehicles and soldiers stationed within Haddatha.

The Institute for the Study of War stated that the “prolonged confrontation” ended on the same day. In contrast, the Israeli Meir Amit Intelligence and Terrorism Information Center described the confrontation as part of a broader propaganda effort.
