= Choukine =

Village in Nabatieh District

Coordinates: 33°21′18″N 35°27′49″E

Choukine Shoukine
- Village
- Interactive map of Choukine
- Country: Lebanon
- District: Nabatieh District
- Established as a municipal entity: 24 February 2004

Area
  - Total: 250 ha (620 acres)

Population
  - Total: 2,500

Choukine is one of the numerous Lebanese villages in the Nabatieh District of the Nabatieh Governorate.

== Name ==
The name likely derives from the semitic or ugaritic word "shekin" which means "residents", "settlers" or "inhabitants".

== History ==
The town preserved various ancient buildings, sarcophagi and ancient tombs which testify its ancient origins as a settlement.

The town became an independent municipal entity on 26 February, 2004, via Lebanese Interior Ministry Decree No. 219.

On 30 May 2026 Israel started its attempts to occupy it following their push past the nearby Mayfadoun and Zawtar al-Sharqiyah.

== Geography ==
The village is located at an altitude of 500 meters above sea level, and 75 kilometers from Beirut via Nabatieh-Mayfadoun. The full size of the entire village is of 250 hectares.

== Population ==
Its population is around 2,500. The local traditional families present within the village are the following: Faqih family, Yassin family, Al-Amin family, Nasser family, Krikir family, Ali Ahmed family, Ezz El-Din family, Jawad family, Ibrahim family, Al-Zein family, Ahmed family, Shahrour family, Shoukini family, Ismail family, Jaber family, Saleh family and the Hammoud family.

== Economy ==
The village produces local olives, almonds, wheat, and tobacco.

== Famous people ==
- Wood sculptor Chaouki Choukini
