= Israeli occupation of Southern Lebanon (2026) =

Israeli-occupation of Southern Lebanon

Israeli occupation of Southern Lebanon רְצוּעַת הַבִּיטָּחוֹן
- Israeli-occupied territory of Lebanon
- Flag

- Israel Israeli occupied Golan Heights Lebanon Lebanese territory under Israeli control Syria Litani River; Yellow Line (For an up-to-date, interactive, detailed map of the current military situation, see here.)
- Declared: 2026 Lebanon War

Government
  - President: Isaac Herzog
  - Prime Minister: Benjamin Netanyahu

On 16 March 2026, Israel began a ground invasion in Lebanon, as part of the 2026 Lebanon war, Hezbollah–Israel conflict, and broader Middle Eastern crisis. While Israel had already been occupying some pieces of Lebanese territory, (Note: Including Shebaa Farms since 1967 and some 10 further square kilometers (3.9 sq mi) since 2024.) the Israeli Defense Forces expanded its military occupation within Lebanon to a total of 570–600 square kilometers (220–232 sq mi) by the 2026 Israel–Lebanon temporary ceasefire.

== Background ==
On 28 February 2026, Israel and the United States launched a war against Iran. With Israel having violated the November 2024 Israel–Lebanon ceasefire agreement on a near-daily basis and Iran being Hezbollah's primary backer, the assassination of Iranian Supreme Leader Ali Khamenei moved the militant group to resume rocket strikes on Israel on 2 March. The Israeli Air Force quickly responded with airstrikes across much of Lebanon, including the capital Beirut, thus initiating the Lebanon war.

The 2026 occupation marks the seventh occupation of Lebanon by Israel. Other such occupations include during the 1948–1949 Arab–Israeli War, the annexation of Shebaa Farms since the Six-Day War in 1967, the 1978 South Lebanon conflict, the 1982–2000 occupation, the 2006 Lebanon War, and the 2024 Lebanon war.

== Occupation ==
By 16 March, the Israeli Ground Forces expanded the war with a ground invasion, while air units continued to destroy civilian infrastructure linking the south from the rest of Lebanon. In 23 March 2026, Israeli Finance Minister Bezalel Smotrich called for Israel to annex Lebanese territory up to the Litani River after the war.

On 24 March, the Israeli Minister of Defense Israel Katz declared that Israel would demolish Lebanese border villages and permanently occupy Lebanese territory up to the Litani River.

The Israeli occupation of Lebanon has resulted in the forced expulsion of more than 1.2 million Lebanese civilians (>20% of the country's population), as Israel prohibits them from returning "until security is guaranteed for the residents of the north [of Israel]." Israel has issued evacuation orders over about 2,000 square kilometers (772 sq mi) of Lebanese territory south of the Zahrani River, with further orders in southern Beirut.

On 15 June 2026, Israeli Prime Minister Benjamin Netanyahu announced that Israeli forces will continue to occupy southern Lebanon, stating that, "We will stay in the Lebanon security buffer zone for as long as necessary."

On 24 June 2026, Israeli defence minister Israel Katz says Israeli forces will not withdraw from southern Lebanon even if "the United States demands it", adding that "200,000 residents will not return" to their homes.

On 5 July 2026, Netanyahu says some Christian-majority villages in southern Lebanon asked to be annexed by Israel for protection from Hezbollah, while villages in the Marjayoun District deny seeking annexation. On the same day, Netanyahu said Israel will maintain the occupation.

In November 2026, Israel reportedly asked the Lebanese government to prevent Hezbollah from attacking Israel if the war with Iran resumes.

== Life under occupation ==
Despite Israeli requests to evacuate most of the villages, towns and cities occupied by the Israeli Defense Forces, some citizens in areas which were non-Shia-majority were allowed to stay in their residences, including Christian, Druze and Sunni inhabited areas. Life under occupation has been characterized by arrests, searches, strict curfews and restricted freedom of movement. Even in authorized villages and towns the population suffered from food shortages, electricity shortage and limited healthcare accessibility.

Despite harsh economic, social and material conditions in permitted areas, people continued to attend religious infrastructures, flock their sheep and attend school.

According to the New York Times, Israel contacted local Christian and Druze in private and pressured them to expel Shiite citizens from their towns.

== See also ==
- State of Free Lebanon
