= Mahmoud Qamati =

Lebanese leader

- Born: 1953 (age 72–73)
- Military career
- Allegiance: Lebanon
- Branch: Hezbollah
- Commands: 1982 Lebanon War; 2026 Lebanon war

Mahmoud Qamati is a high-ranking Lebanese leader in Hezbollah, serving as the deputy head of the party's political council. He has held important political positions, including that of a former minister.

== Personal life ==
Mahmoud Qamati was born in Haret Hreik, Beirut in 1953, into a working-class Lebanese neighborhood that was part of the southern suburbs, which witnessed significant political and social development during that period. He is married and has seven children.

He began his work as a teacher of Arabic language and literature in public schools and obtained a postgraduate diploma in political sociology, which formed the basis for his entry into the political and organizational world in his early years, where he began to participate in social and cultural activities in his region.

During the 1970s and 1980s, Qamati emerged as a prominent figure in political activism related to the resistance, influenced by the transformations in Lebanon resulting from the 1982 Lebanon War, which prompted many to join the ranks of the nascent Hezbollah, and he was one of the founders of the party from its inception. He moved through many positions in Hezbollah, eventually becoming the deputy head of the political council, and was responsible for the file of relations with Lebanese parties.

== Political career ==
Qamati is known for his firm stance on the issue of the weapons disarmament of Hezbollah, having affirmed Hezbollah's refusal to hand them over to the state, describing the government's decisions to confine weapons to the state as “stillborn.” He emphasized that the weapons are necessary to preserve Lebanon's sovereignty in the face of international and Israeli pressures, while stressing that no guarantees would be offered in exchange for their removal.

For several years Qatami operates as Deputy Head of Hezbollah's Political Council.

During the 2026 war between Hezbollah and Israel, that Hezbollah initiated following the 2026 Iran war, Qamati made escalatory statements toward the Lebanese authorities, warning that the party is “capable of overturning the country and the government” and that its patience “has limits.” He argued that the Lebanese government is no longer fit to manage the country and serves Israel's interests, hinting that confrontation with the political authority could become inevitable after the war ends, and pointing to the possibility of holding accountable those he described as “traitors,” reflecting rising internal tensions alongside the military escalation.

== See also ==
- Hezbollah
- Naim Qassem
