= Lebanese displacement during the Israel–Hezbollah conflict (2023–present) =

Refugees and displaced persons from ongoing conflict

Citizens and permanent residents of Lebanon have fled the nation or have been internally displaced since the escalation of tensions between Israel and Hezbollah beginning in 2023, and especially during and following the September 2024 Israeli attacks against Lebanon in the south and the Beqaa Valley. As of 25 September 2024, nearly 500,000 people were reported by Lebanese officials to have been displaced due to the strikes.

== Background ==
A day after Hamas launched its 7 October 2023 attacks on Israel, Hezbollah joined the conflict, citing support for the Palestinians, by firing on Shebaa Farms, Safed, Nahariya, and other Israeli military positions. Since then, Hezbollah and Israel have been involved in cross-border military exchanges that have displaced entire communities in Israel and Lebanon, with significant damage to buildings and land along the border.

Beginning on 23 September 2024, Israel conducted about 1,500 attacks on Hezbollah positions in Lebanon, in an operation codenamed Northern Arrows. Targeted regions included southern Lebanon, the Beqaa Valley, and the suburbs of Beirut. According to Lebanon's Health Ministry, these Israeli strikes have killed at least 700 people—including 50 children, 94 women, and 4 medics—and injured at least 1,835. The strikes were the deadliest attack in Lebanon since the end of the 1975–1990 Lebanese Civil War.

== Displacement ==
=== 2023 ===
As a result of Israeli bombardments from 7 October 2023 to prior to the 23 September 2024 strikes, over 111,000 civilians in Lebanon were displaced during the course of the renewed conflict. A report from Amnesty International released on 16 October 2023 stated that the Israeli Defense Forces (IDF) fired white phosphorus shells into Dhayra, hospitalizing nine civilians and setting fire to civilian homes, cars, and other belongings and thus forcing the displacement of civilians in the attack zones.

Hezbollah stopped its military operations briefly after the temporary ceasefire between Israel and Hamas put into effect on 24 November, which prompted the IDF to stop the shelling on targets in southern Lebanon. As a result, many displaced civilians returned to their homes amid the calm.

=== September 2024 ===
In addition to the hundreds of thousands of Lebanese who had already been displaced since October 2023, 90,000 more were initially reported to have been displaced in the immediate aftermath of the 23 September strikes. On that day, those fleeing south Lebanon were stuck in traffic as two-hour journeys turned into daylong journeys. On 25 September, Lebanon's foreign minister Abdallah Bou Habib said that nearly 500,000 people were displaced due to the strikes.

==== Internal displacement ====
Thousands of displaced Lebanese citizens took refuge in Beirut, especially in the Hamra neighborhood. The rapid and sudden influx of refugees into the city resulted in significant numbers of hotels and shelters being filled to occupancy, localized shortages in food supplies, and an "enormous gridlock of traffic" coming from south of Beirut. Many displaced persons in Beirut and Sidon slept in parks, in cars, and along the beach due to most displacement shelters being fully occupied.

==== Syria ====
The United Nations High Commissioner for Refugees (UNHCR) reported that hundreds of civilian cars and buses attempting to escape Lebanon across the Lebanon–Syria border were stalled in queues extending for several kilometers. In addition, it reported that many Lebanese civilians in large crowds that included women, children, infants, and those injured from Israeli attacks, reached the Syrian border on foot while carrying whatever they could. Once reaching the border, many of the displaced had to wait hours in order to receive essential aid due to the significant volume of refugees, with many having to wait outside at night in cold temperatures. Commissioner Filippo Grandi stated that many of the newly displaced were families who part of the 1.5 million Syrian refugees displaced from the Syrian civil war into Lebanon, only to be forcefully displaced again due to the severe bombardments.

Many of the Lebanese who reached Syria took shelter in rented houses and apartments, with some having paid rent well in advance in case of any sudden escalations. Many Lebanese escaped into Syria due to its proximity to the attacked Beqaa Valley, due to its crossing not requiring a visa for Lebanese citizens, and due to the relative cheapness of rent for property in Syria relative to in Lebanon.

Many Syrian refugees in Lebanon who were displaced again by Israeli attacks were apprehensive of returning to Syria out of fears that they would be conscripted into the Syrian Army or arrested for real or accused actions in favor of opposition to President of Syria Bashar al-Assad. In response to this, Assad notified Syrian citizens that they would receive an amnesty for any possible infractions committed prior to 22 September 2024, which included those who dodged conscription.

== Responses ==
In November 2023, the Lebanon Humanitarian Fund implemented its reserve allocation of up to four million USD in support for its partners to help aid Lebanese civilians who were displaced or were trapped in conflict zones.

In response to the 23 September 2024 strikes, two hundred ninety schools were converted into shelters. Due to the Lebanese government being ill-equipped to provide supplies or staff, many non-governmental organizations, political-party affiliated volunteers, and individual donors collaborated in attempting to meet the needs of the displaced. The UNHCR stated that it would scale up support based on the growing amount of displaced people in need, and would work with the Syrian Arab Red Crescent to provide food, water, essential supplies, and guidance to refugees at border crossings into Syria. Dina Darwiche, a UNHCR staff member, was killed along with one of her children in an Israeli strike in Beqaa.

== See also ==
- Libyan refugees
- Refugees of the Syrian civil war
- Syrians in Lebanon
- Ukrainian refugee crisis
