= 2026 Israel–Lebanon ceasefire =

Halt to 2026 Lebanon war

Ten Day Cessation of Hostilities to Enable Peace Negotiations Between Israel and Lebanon
- Type: Ceasefire
- Context: Stopping the 2026 Lebanon war and the Israel–Hezbollah conflict.
- Effective: 16 April 2026, 5:00 pm EST
- Mediators: United States
- Parties: Israel; Lebanon

The 2026 Israel–Lebanon ceasefire is a cessation of hostilities agreed between Israel and Lebanon on 16 April 2026, amid the ongoing 2026 Lebanon war and wider regional conflict linked to the 2026 Iran war. The agreement, brokered by the United States, established a 10-day truce intended to halt active fighting and create conditions for further negotiations toward a longer-term settlement.

The ceasefire came into effect shortly after its announcement and marked the first direct diplomatic engagement between Israel and Lebanon in decades. On 17 April, Iran announced that passage of commercial vessels through the Hormuz Strait was completely open during the truce in Lebanon, but closed it again the next day in response to the US refusal to lift its naval blockade.

On 23 April, US President Donald Trump announced that Israel and Lebanon agreed to a three-week extension of the ceasefire. On 27 April, Hezbollah leader Naim Qassem stated that the group will not revert to the pre-March status and will respond to Israeli attacks. On 15 May, the truce was extended for another 45 days. On 1 June, Israel and Hezbollah agreed to a ceasefire, with Israel committing not to target Beirut's southern suburbs and Hezbollah vowing not to attack Israel, under a US proposal aiming to extend the ceasefire to all of Lebanon. On 3 June, Israel and Lebanon agreed to renew the ceasefire, mediated by the US, and plan to establish "pilot zones". On 4 June, Hezbollah rejected the truce deal announced the previous day and instead demanded a comprehensive truce and full withdrawal of Israel from Lebanon. On 19 June, an American official said that Israel and Hezbollah agreed to a truce mediated by the US, Qatar and Iran. On 26 June, US Secretary of State Marco Rubio announced a framework deal between Israel and Lebanon for "lasting peace and security" via US mediation. The agreement includes a cease-fire, requiring Hezbollah to end hostilities and withdraw from southern Lebanon, but it was subsequently rejected by Hezbollah.

== Background ==
The ceasefire followed weeks of escalating violence between Israel and Hezbollah forces in Lebanon, which intensified in March 2026 after regional tensions linked to the Iran war.

Israeli airstrikes and ground operations across Lebanon, combined with Hezbollah's rocket and drone attacks toward northern Israel, resulted in heavy casualties and widespread displacement. By mid-April, more than 2,000 people had been killed in Lebanon, and over one million had been displaced.

Prior ceasefire arrangements related to the Iran war did not formally include Lebanon, contributing to continued hostilities and complicating diplomatic efforts.

The Israel–Lebanon peace talks opened between Israel and Lebanon during 2026, following the renewed fighting between Israel and Hezbollah. For the first time since the failure of the May 17 Agreement (1983), Israel and the Lebanese government announced the opening of direct negotiations with the goal of reaching a peace agreement and disarming Hezbollah.

== Terms ==
The ceasefire established a 10-day cessation of hostilities, during which both sides agreed to halt offensive military operations. According to a statement by the United States Department of State, the agreement included the following provisions:

- A cessation of hostilities beginning on 16 April 2026 at 17:00 EST for an initial period of ten days, intended to enable negotiations toward a permanent agreement.
- The possibility of extending the ceasefire by mutual agreement if progress is made in negotiations and Lebanon demonstrates effective sovereignty.
- Israel retains the right to act in self-defense against imminent or ongoing threats, while refraining from offensive military operations in Lebanon.
- Lebanon, with international support, is to take steps to prevent Hezbollah and other non-state armed groups from carrying out attacks against Israel.
- Recognition of the Lebanese state's security forces as solely responsible for national sovereignty and defense.
- A request for the United States to facilitate further direct negotiations, including on border demarcation and a comprehensive peace agreement.

Hezbollah was not a formal signatory to the agreement, despite being a principal party in the fighting.

== Implementation ==
The ceasefire took effect on 16–17 April 2026, following continued exchanges of fire in the hours leading up to its implementation.

Israeli officials stated that forces would remain deployed inside southern Lebanon during the truce. Hezbollah, while not formally part of the agreement, indicated it would respond to any violations, raising concerns about the stability of the ceasefire.

Reports of violations and continued tensions emerged shortly after the ceasefire began, with both sides accusing each other of breaches. Lebanese officials and allied groups warned displaced civilians not to return immediately due to ongoing uncertainty and security risks.

== Violations ==
=== Attacks by Israel ===
- On 25 April, the Lebanese Health Ministry reported that six people, four in Yohmor Al-Shaqeef, Nabatieh and two in Safad al-Battikh, Bint Jbeil, were killed by Israeli attacks under the orders of Israeli Prime Minister Benjamin Netanyahu to "forcefully attack Hezbollah targets" after the IDF accused the group of breaching the ceasefire agreement.
- On 26 April, the Lebanese Health Ministry stated that 14 people, including two women and two children, were killed and 37 others were injured by Israeli attacks in southern Lebanon.
- On 28 April, Israeli forces launched a double tap strike in Majdal Zoun, killing 9 people, including three emergency workers. The Israeli military stated that the strike targeted a Hezbollah commander operated in an Israeli-occupied area in southern Lebanon, despite providing no evidence.
- On 30 April, the National News Agency reported that several Israeli attacks targeted places in southern Lebanon, killing at least 28 people. President Joseph Aoun condemned Israel's "continuing violations", stating that "despite the ceasefire, as do demolitions of homes and places of worship, while the number of killed and wounded rises day after day".
- On 1 May, the Health Ministry of Lebanon reported that 13 people, including four women and a child, were killed by Israeli attacks in Habboush, Zrariyeh and Ain Baal.
- On 15 May, an Israeli airstrike targeted the town of Harouf, southern Lebanon, killing at least six people, including three paramedics.
- On 19 May, at least 22 people, including several women and children, were killed by Israeli airstrikes in Deir Qanoun an-Naher, Nabatieh and Kfar Sir in southern Lebanon. The IDF stated that the Israeli military struck "a Hezbollah terrorist in a structure used for military purposes" and "carried out carried out in an area evacuated of civilians, while steps were taken to mitigate harm to civilians, including the use of precise munitions and aerial surveillance".
- On 22 May, six Lebanese paramedics were killed in two separate Israeli attacks in Hanaway and Deir Qanoun an-Naher. The Lebanese Health Ministry condemned the attacks as violations of international law.
- On 9 June, eight people were killed and 32 others were injured after Israeli forces attacked the Al-Masaken neighbourhood in Tyre, Lebanon. That same day, the IDF issued a warning for residents of the Christian quarter of the city to evacuate.
- On 13 June, at least five people, including the mayor of the Ar-Rihan municipality Ali Badie, were killed by Israeli air raids across various locations in southern Lebanon.

== Reactions ==
=== Regional ===
Rabbi Eliyahu Zini, the uncle of Shin Bet Chief David Zini, criticized the agreement with the Lebanese government, asserting, "all of Lebanon belongs to us." He questioned Israeli ministers, asking, "Are you normal? You are giving up the inheritance of our ancestors on what basis?".

Hezbollah expressed conditional acceptance of the ceasefire, warning that Israeli military presence in Lebanon would justify continued resistance.

Lebanese political figures advised civilians to delay returning to affected areas until the terms and stability of the agreement became clearer.

=== International ===
European Commission President Ursula von der Leyen welcomed the agreement and emphasized its importance in reducing violence and enabling humanitarian relief. The Indian Ministry of External Affairs also welcomed the initiative. Iran announced that passage of commercial vessels through the Strait of Hormuz is completely open during the truce in Lebanon. Iran later said that it closed the Strait of Hormuz again in response to the US refusing to lift its naval blockade.

== See also ==
- Islamabad Talks
- 2024 Israel–Lebanon ceasefire agreement
- 2026 Iran war ceasefire
