= Bayada, Lebanon =

Town in Lebanon

Bayada
- town
- Location within Lebanon
- Coordinates: 33°10′16″N 35°12′33″E
- Country: Lebanon
- Control: Israel
- Governorate: South Governorate
- District: Tyre
- Time zone: GMT +3

Bayada is a town in Tyre District, South Lebanon. On 29 March, 2026, Israeli troops advanced quickly through southern Lebanon, reaching the town of Bayada, just 8km from the city of Tyre.
