= Ali al-Taher =

Location in Southern Lebanon

Ali al-Taher علي الطاهر
- Farm, hill and shrine
- Interactive map of Ali al-Taher
- Country: Lebanon
- Governorate: Nabatieh Governorate
- Elevation: 600 m (2,000 ft)

Ali al-Taher (Arabic: علي الطاهر) is a location in the Nabatieh district of the Nabatieh Governorate, Southern Lebanon.

The name is used to refer to the hills on the northern outskirts of Nabatieh al-Fawqa and the village.

== Geography ==
Ali al-Taher ridge is on the northern outskirts Nabatieh, in the Nabatieh district of the Nabatieh Governorate, rising to roughly 600 metres (2,000 ft) above sea level. The ridge lies north of the Litani River and its elevated position commands views over much of southern Lebanon, including Beaufort Castle and its surrounding valley to the south, the city of Nabatieh to the west and further southeast Iqlim al-Tuffah and the Rihan heights in the Jezzine District.

The area also contains a natural spring known locally as "Ein al-Tahara" and an old well, alongside remnants of ancient buildings, indicating earlier habitation of the site. The hillside is covered in places by dense, old-growth oak forest. Its elevated position also offers views extending toward parts of the Marjeyoun and Hasbaya districts.

== History ==
The site is named after a figure revered locally as a "Wali" (a righteous person), believed to be a commander from early Islamic historical periods. A Maqam (shrine) was erected at the summit in his honor. This shrine was a place of local pilgrimage for residents of nearby villages, particularly during religious commemorations.

The shrine was restored in 1180 AH (1766–1767 CE) by Hajj Ali Hilal, and its religious endowments (waqf) have historically been administered by the Nour al-Din family of Nabatieh al-Fawqa. The site is historically described as lying within the district known as "Bilad al-Shaqif", named after the nearby Shaqif Arnoun (Beaufort) fortress.

Edward Robinson mentioned the shrine in the account of his second journey to Lebanon in 1852, locating it west of Mount Jarmaq, although he did not personally visit the site. The shrine is also cited in several works of local and regional history, including Muhsin al-Amin's Khitat Jabal Amil, Sheikh Ibrahim Suleiman's Buldan Jabal Amil, and Sheikh Jaafar al-Muhajir's Sittat Fuqaha Abtal ("Six Hero Jurists"). Pilgrimages to the site were reportedly most prominent during the commemoration of Arba'in of Imam Husayn.

During the 2026 Lebanon War the hill was subjected by skirmishes and strikes between Hezbollah and Israel due to its strategic position near Nabatieh al-Fawqa and the city of Nabatieh. In June 2026, the Israel Defense Forces reported that the ridge contained a Hezbollah underground facility built with Iranian assistance. On July 2, the Egoz commando unit of the IDF claimed to have killed a militant exiting a tunnel in the area.

=== 2026 siege ===
It was reported in September 2026 that Israeli forces had surrounded approximately 200 Hezbollah fighters and Iranian military advisors from the Islamic Revolutionary Guard Corps who were sheltering in the complex. By 4 September, the Israeli government said that it had gained "operational control" of the ridge, with Defense Minister Israel Katz stating that the Israeli control of the ridge was part of a "security zone in southern Lebanon" that it was establishing. On 10 September 2026, the IDF said that it had detonated more than 1,000 tons of TNT (4,200 GJ) of explosives, destroying the network of tunnels stretching 2 kilometres (1.2 mi) underneath the ridge and setting off tremors that measured 4.1 on the Richter scale in what Lebanon's National News Agency called a "massive explosion".

== Notable people ==
- Ali al-Tahir

== See also ==
- 2006 Lebanon War
- South Lebanon security belt
