= Zahrani River =

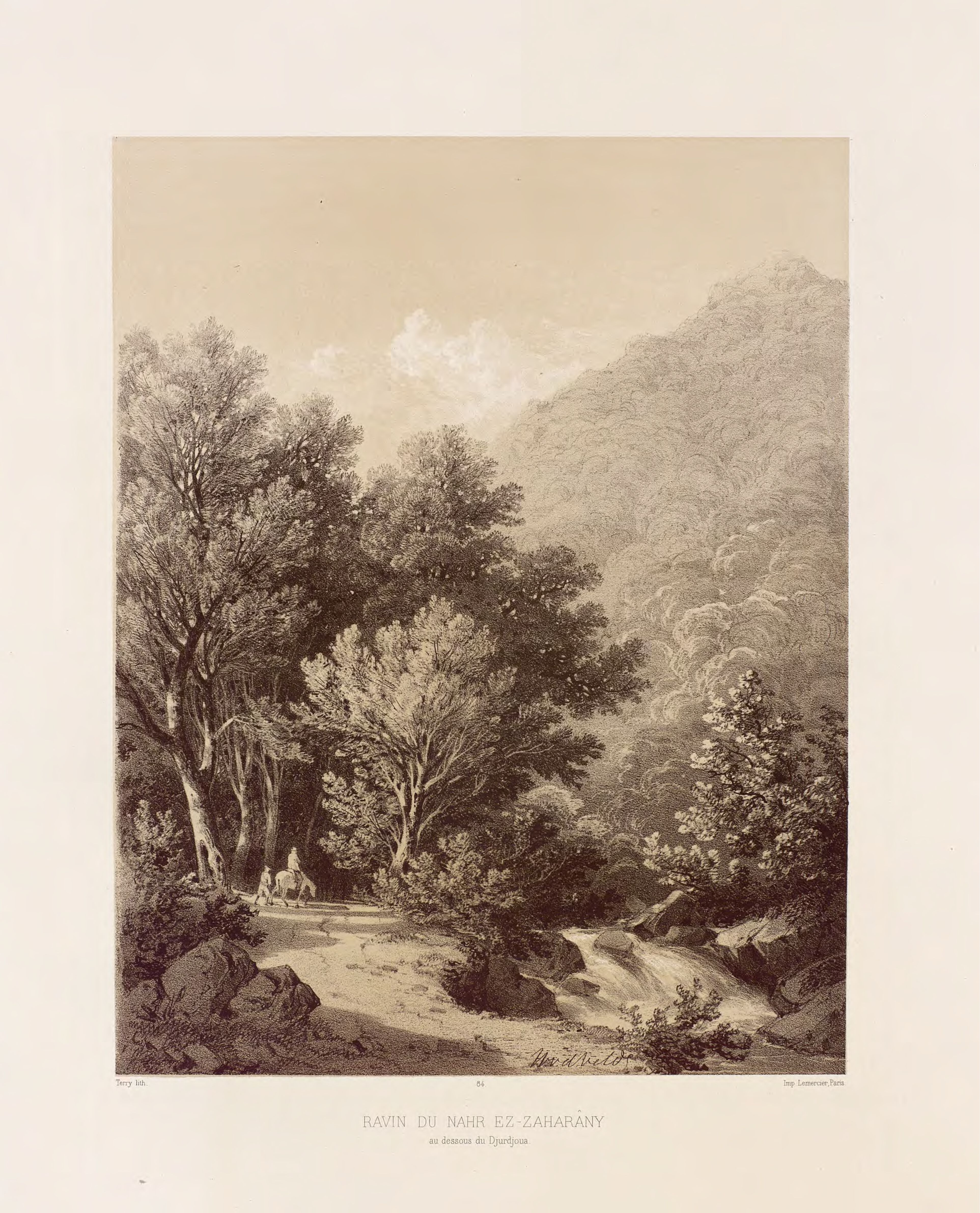

- Location of mouth
- Native name: نهرالزهراني (Arabic)

Location
- Country: Lebanon

Physical characteristics
- Mouth
  - location: Mediterranean Sea
  - coordinates: 33.49531045373644°N 35.33479545021399°E

The Zahrani (Arabic: نهر زهراني) is a river in Southern Lebanon. It is located south of Sidon. Zahrani (زهراني) is the adjective form of the noun Zahran (زهران), which means flowering or blossoming in Arabic. This river irrigates most of Jabal Rihane and Nabatiyeh areas. It is considered one of the most important rivers of the Jabal Rihane area. Its mouth is located north of the mouth of the (longer) Litani River.

Zahrani Bridge crosses over this river.
