= Mayfadoun =

Mayfadoun ميفدون
- Municipality
- Location within Lebanon
- Coordinates: 33°20′55″N 35°28′35″E
- Grid position: 125/157 L
- Country: Lebanon
- Governorate: Nabatieh Governorate
- District: Nabatieh District
- Time zone: UTC+2 (EET)
  - Summer (DST): UTC+3 (EEST)
- Dialing code: +961

Mayfadoun (Arabic: ميفدون, romanized: Mayfadūn) is a municipality in Nabatieh District in southern Lebanon.

== History ==
In the 1596 tax records, it was named as a village in the Ottoman nahiya (subdistrict) of Sagif under the liwa' (district) of Safad, with a population of 11 households, all Muslim. The villagers paid a fixed tax-rate of 25 % on agricultural products, such as wheat, barley and olive trees; a total of 5,269 akçe.

On 6 August 2024, four Hezbollah fighters were killed in an Israeli airstrike in the village amid renewed hostilities.

On 15 April 2026, Israeli forces carried out a quadruple tap strike in Mayfadoun. The attack targeted medical crews from the Islamic Health Association, the Islamic Risala Scout Association, and the Nabatieh Emergency Services, killing four paramedics and wounding six others.

== Demographics ==
In 2014 Muslims made up 98.79% of registered voters in Mayfadoun. 98.13% of the voters were Shiite Muslims.

== Bibliography ==
- Hütteroth, W.-D.; Abdulfattah, K. (1977). Historical Geography of Palestine, Transjordan and Southern Syria in the Late 16th Century. Erlanger Geographische Arbeiten, Sonderband 5. Erlangen, Germany: Vorstand der Fränkischen Geographischen Gesellschaft. ISBN 3-920405-41-2.
- Rhode, H. (1979). Administration and Population of the Sancak of Safed in the Sixteenth Century (PhD). Columbia University. Archived from the original on 2016-10-10.
