= National News Agency =

Official news agency of the Lebanon government

- الوكالة الوطنية للإعلام

Agency overview
- Formed: 1961
- Headquarters: Beirut
- Employees: 300
- Website: https://www.nna-leb.gov.lb/ar

The National News Agency (NNA; Arabic: الوكالة الوطنية للإعلام) is the official news agency of the government of Lebanon, located at the headquarters of the Ministry of Information in Hamra, Beirut. Established in 1961, the domestic and international news publisher publishes in Arabic, English and French.

As of 2023, the NNA has about 300 employees working at more than 20 offices across Lebanon and is an active member of the Federation of Arab News Agencies (FANA).

== Stolen photo archive ==
On 27 February 2023, a server, which contained photos of events since 1961, and five computers were reportedly stolen from the agency's archive room; the archive had pictures of the country's 1975–1990 civil war. Later, Minister Ziad Makary, who had described the theft as a "crime of national proportions", said that only part of the photo archive was taken, and the ministry still had the database.

== See also ==
- Télé Liban – government-owned television network
- Ministry of Information (Lebanon)
