= Battle of Zawtar al-Sharqiyah =

Battle during the 2026 Lebanon War

- Part of 2026 Lebanon War and 2026 Iran War
Date	27–31 May 2026 (5 days)
Location	Zawtar al-Sharqiyah, Zawtar al-Gharbiyah, and Beaufort Castle, Lebanon
Result	Israeli victory
Territorial changes	Zawtar al-Sharqiyah, Yohmor and other nearby towns occupied by the IDF; Capture of Beaufort Castle

Belligerents
Israel	Hezbollah

Units involved
Israel Defense Forces; Israeli Ground Forces; 36th Division (Israel); Israeli Air Force	Hezbollah military; Local garrison

Strength
More than 16 tanks and seven armored personnel carriers	Unknown

Casualties and losses
1 soldier confirmed dead	Unknown

The Battle of Zawtar al-Sharqiyah was a battle that started on 27 May 2026 between Israel and Hezbollah fighters centered in and around the town of Zawtar al-Sharqiyah, located in the Nabatieh Governorate of southern Lebanon. Israel had previously crossed the Litani River and occupied the outskirts of the town and the surrounding area before the battle.

The town of Zawtar al-Gharbiyah, a twin town of Zawtar al-Sharqiyah, was also involved in the confrontation.

== Background ==
=== Importance of Zawtar al-Sharqiyah ===
Situated on the northern bank of the Litani River and approximately 7 kilometers (4.3 miles) southeast of the major city of Nabatieh, Zawtar al-Sharqiyah holds immense geographical importance. The town sits on the edge of the Israeli Defense Forces' previously declared "Yellow Line", a 10-kilometer-deep security buffer zone established inside Lebanese territory earlier in the conflict. The battle is also believed to exist as to exert pressure during ceasefire negotiations.

Lebanese Armed Forces Brigadier General Mounir Shehadeh told Mada Masr that capturing the town is part of a wider strategic plan as to advance towards Nabatieh, however, he added, that the town would be "complex" to conquer for the IDF.

=== Start of hostilities ===
At the start of the 2026 Iran war, U.S. and Israeli strikes killed Iran's Supreme Leader, Ali Khamenei. Following Iranian confirmation of Khamenei's death on 1 March, Hezbollah Secretary-General Naim Qassem vowed to retaliate and "undertake our duty of confronting the aggression", stating that Hezbollah would not leave "the field of honour and resistance".

On 2 March, Hezbollah launched several projectiles into northern Israel, its first such attack since the 2024 ceasefire, targeting a missile defence site near Haifa. The group described the attack as a "defensive act" aimed at forcing Israel to halt its operations in Lebanon and withdraw from occupied areas, stating it was unrelated to the Iran war.

The Israel Defense Forces (IDF) said one projectile was intercepted while others landed in open areas. In response, Israel carried out overnight airstrikes in Beirut and across southern Lebanon, killing hundreds of civilians and issuing evacuation orders for dozens of communities. The IDF claimed the strikes targeted senior Hezbollah figures and infrastructure; it later reported killing Hezbollah intelligence chief Hussain Makled, while early reports suggested other senior leaders may also have been targeted.

=== Iran war ceasefire and Lebanon war ceasefire ===
Pakistan mediated the 2026 Iran war ceasefire and said Lebanon was included in the ceasefire, temporarily halting the 2026 Iran war for two weeks. Shortly after, Israeli prime minister Benjamin Netanyahu denied that was the case alongside U.S. President Donald Trump. On the contrary Pakistan and Iran insisted that Lebanon was included in the ceasefire alongside other nations such as France and Egypt.

Israel soon after initiated Operation Eternal Darkness and struck various sites in Lebanon in what were defined as the largest attacks since the start of the entire war. What followed was "Operation Silver Plow", which was announced by Israel Katz and led to the occupation of various villages in Southern Lebanon and the Battle of Bint Jbeil.

Following the 2026 Israel–Lebanon ceasefire, Israeli demolitions and military operations still persisted, with both sides insisting that there was objectively no ceasefire. Additionally, following the ceasefire, Israel declared the creation of a "Yellow Line" in Southern Lebanon akin to that in Gaza. The Yellow Line also included Zawtar al-Sharqiyah and its surrounding areas.

=== Initial crossing of the Litani ===
The IDF initially attempted to cross the river before utilising the Yahalom combat engineers and paratroopers under Division 98, which had failed.

However, a following offensive by the IDF took control over the outskirts of the town of Zawtar al-Sharqiyah, where they encountered significant resistance, as well as the northern bank opposite of Al-Qantara.

=== Renewed offensive in Lebanon ===
On 25 May 2026 Israel announced renewed offensives in Lebanon after Benjamin Nethanyahu confirmed US approval of responding to threats on "every front" despite ceasefire talks being ongoing.

On 26 May, following evacuation orders directed on Nabatieh, ground reporter Obaida Hitto of Al Jazeera, reporting from the city of Tyre, reported that the Israeli troops were observed crossing the Litani river in the direction of the town of Zawtar al-Sharqiyah.

== Battle ==
=== 27 May ===
Hezbollah reported that they faced the Israeli Defense Forces trying to enter the town, preceded by a campaign of airstrikes as to weaken the town's defenses beforehand. As to avoid rough terrain the Israeli army reportedly used a longer route passing through Deir Siryan and its adjacent road allowing the 18 mobilized vehicles to mobilize using a flatter and more manageable terrain.

Lebanese sources claimed that the Israeli Defense Forces had retreated south of the Litani River following the confrontation.

The only given statement at the time by the Israeli Defense Forces was that they were "unaware of anything unusual".

=== 28 May ===
Hezbollah reported that the IDF had allegedly withdrawn from the town following confrontation, reporting continued strikes against them in the nearby areas. Despite these reports satellite footage confirmed the presence of IDF units within the town in the neighbourhoods adjacent to the riverbed, in the outskirts of the town. Additionally, The New York Times reported that the clashes within the town remained fierce.

Lebanese authorities also reported and condemned strikes in the areas surrounding the nearby Beaufort Castle stating it posed possible threat to the integrity of the UNESCO site.

=== 29 May ===
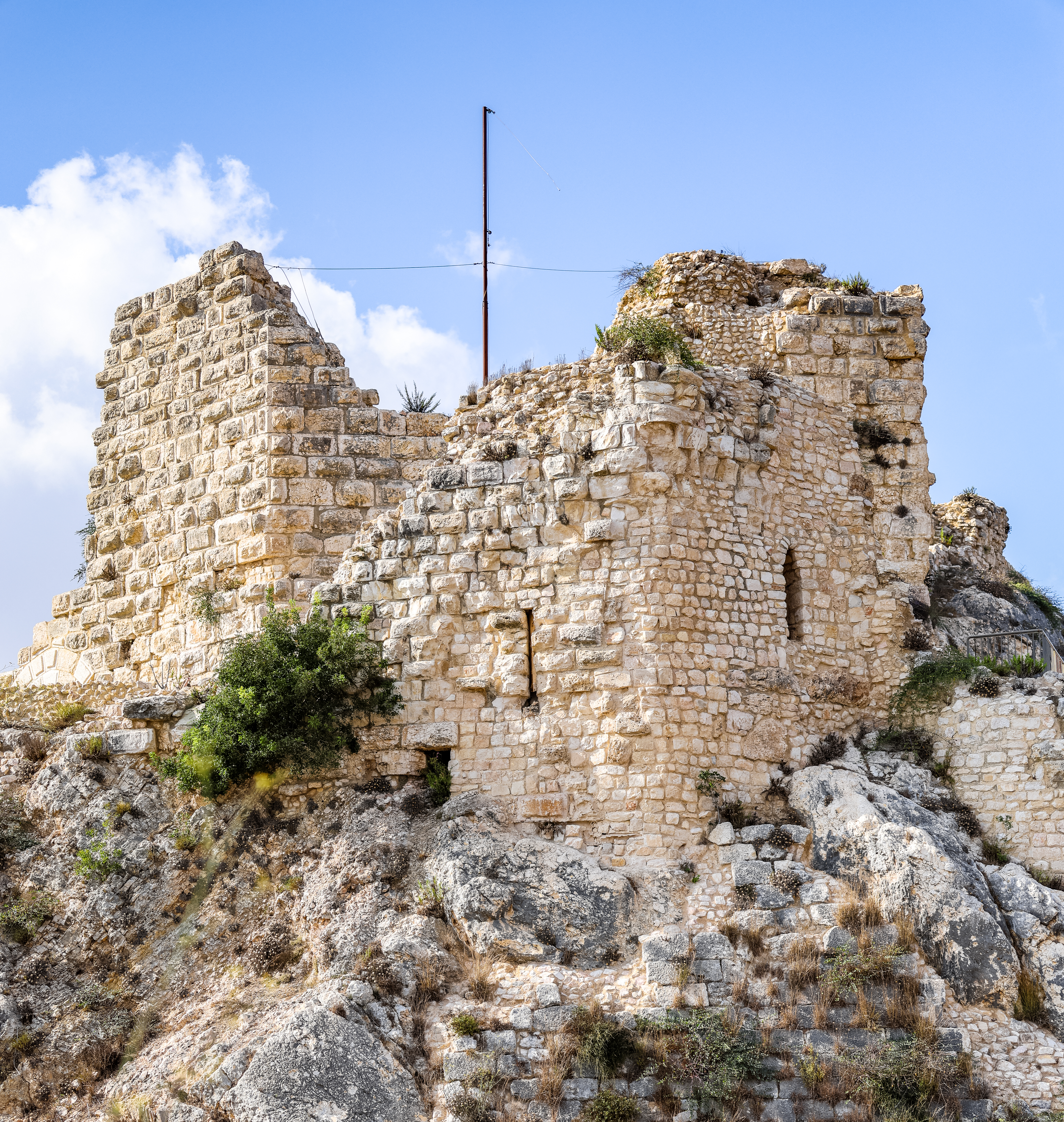
Photo of the remains of Beaufort Castle (2022), an area involved in the battle.

Al Jazeera reported that Israel had broken Hezbollah's second line of defense and increased focus of firepower near the town. The Lebanese sources that previously reported the alleged IDF retreat south of the Litani River also reported that the IDF had once again crossed the river in a renewed offensive. Reports of casualties were reported within Hezbollah.

The road leading up to Beaufort Castle had become impossible to use for the Directorate General of Antiquities, preventing local authorities, architects and archeologists from monitoring the conditions of the castle. According to local reports the IDF sent 16 tanks and seven armored personnel carriers towards the UNESCO site with the alleged goal of gaining control over it. The castle was also subjected to Israeli air strikes and bombs, directly targeting and hitting it. The Hezbollah intelligence officer for the Beaufort Castle area was reported dead by the IDF.

Benjamin Nethanyahu confirmed that the 36th Division was operating north of the Litani, commenting they were "dominating the terrain".

=== 30 May ===
The clashes surrounding and within the Beaufort Castle continued, with Israeli forces attempting to advance within it from the occupied town of Yohmor al-Chaqif where the IDF positioned itself. Meanwhile, Al Jazeera reported that the IDF had "pushed past" Zawtar al-Sharqiyeh and Mayfadoun and were now heading toward Choukine. Local residents of Mayfadoun, Choukine, Zebdin, Ansar, Zrariyeh, Mazra'at Kawthariyat ar Ruzz and Machghara were asked to evacuate north of the Zahrani River, with the IDF claiming this was done because they "did not want to hurt them".

=== 31 May ===
The IDF announced that Beaufort Castle had been occupied and that the army was now pursuing their control over the adjacent valley. One Israeli soldier was also reported dead by the army following the battle.

== Aftermath ==
After securing the town of Zawtar al-Sharqiyah the IDF reached the outskirts of Nabatieh. Thanks to the subsequent occupations following the battle the IDF was able to construct new bridges as to allow an increased number of Israeli troops to cross the river. Control over the Beaufort Castle was a symbolic and strategic victory, following the event a photo of the Israeli flag being raised over the castle circulated online, being the first time such event occurred in 26 years. The overall battle and the seizure of the castle were described by Benjamin Nethanyahu as a strategical and symbolic "shift in policy" in the 2026 Lebanon War.
