= Ebba, Lebanon =

Ebba عبا
- Municipality
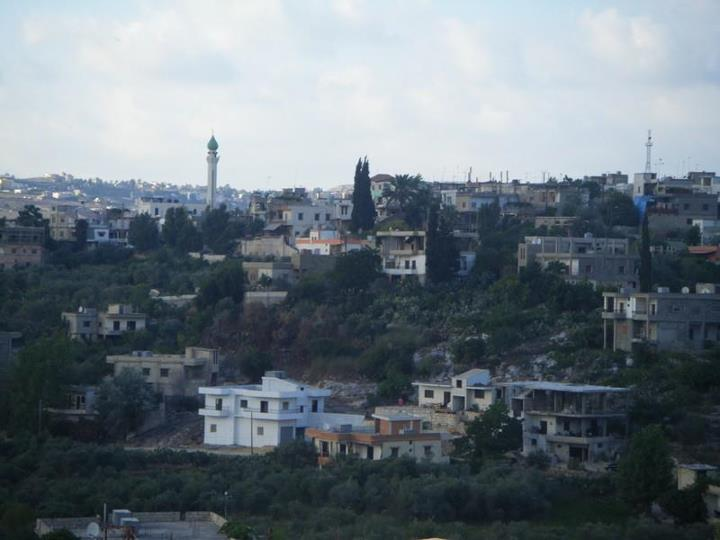

- Location within Lebanon
- Coordinates: 33°21′36″N 35°24′00″E
- Grid position: 118/158 L
- Country: Lebanon
- Governorate: Nabatieh Governorate
- District: Nabatieh District

Area
  - Total: 7.42 km^{2} (2.86 sq mi)
- Highest elevation: 300 m (980 ft)
- Lowest elevation: 200 m (660 ft)

Population
  - Total: 8,000
  - Density: 1,100/km^{2} (2,800/sq mi)
- Time zone: UTC+2 (EET)
  - Summer (DST): UTC+3 (EEST)
- Dialing code: +961

Ebba, also known as Aabba and Ubba (Arabic: عبا; Syriac: ܥܒܐ), is a municipality in the Nabatieh Governorate region of southern Lebanon located between Nabatieh and Tyr, north of the Litani River.

== Etymology ==
There are many possibilities in determining the origin of the word "ebba; aba or ubba". They are either Syriac word "ܥ ܒ ܐ" may mean forest; or Arabic is derived from the word "ALEBB / العِبّ"; or linked to on behalf of a tribe or family "Abbou /عِبّو".

== History ==
In 1875 Victor Guérin found the village to have 300 Metuali inhabitants.

== Location ==
The village is located approximately 12 kilometers from Nabatieh and 84 kilometers from Beirut, and rises approximately 250 –300 meters from the sea level.

The total area of this village is 7.42 km2, about 35% of the area of town occupied by full of buildings and institutions and the rest divided between agricultural land, republic land and WAQF land. The cultivated area is about 55% of the limits of the town, while the estimated length of the road network is about 35 km linear.

Several valleys separate EBBA from the nearest villages: Ansar, Doueir, Jibshit, Harouf, Aadshit al-Shqeif and Zrarieh.

== Demographics ==
In 2014 Muslims made up 99.70% of registered voters in Ebba. 98.65% of the voters were Shiite Muslims.

Ebba, is a majority Shia Muslims village with 9,000 as a total population.

The name of families living in EBBA:

- Tarhini
- Kaouk
- Hariri
- Youness
- Diab (or ZYAB)
- Ibrahim
- Omais
- Mouallem
- Fahes
- Kalot
- Hijazi
- Noureddine
- Ezzeddine
- Salami

== Education ==
There are two schools in the village, one private school and one intermediate public school.

== Bibliography ==
- Guérin, V. (1880). Description Géographique Historique et Archéologique de la Palestine (in French). Vol. 3: Galilee, pt. 2. Paris: L'Imprimerie Nationale.
