= 2024 Israel–Lebanon ceasefire agreement =

60-day halt to Israel–Hezbollah conflict

Announcement of a Cessation of Hostilities and Related Commitments on Enhanced Security Arrangements and Toward the Implementation of UNSCR 1701
- The Israel–Lebanon–Syria border region
- Type: Ceasefire agreement
- Context: Temporarily stopping the 2024 Israeli invasion of Lebanon and the Israel–Hezbollah conflict, designed to cease hostilities permanently
- Signed: 26 November 2024
- Effective: 27 November 2024, 02:00 GMT
- Expiration: 2 March 2026
- Mediators: United States; France
- Parties: Israel; Lebanon

On 27 November 2024, a ceasefire agreement was signed by Israel, Lebanon, and five mediating countries, including the United States. Hezbollah attacked Israel on 8 October 2023, leading to a year of cross-border fighting, and on 1 October 2024, Israel invaded Lebanon. The agreement mandates a 60-day halt to hostilities, during which Israel must withdraw its forces from Southern Lebanon, and Hezbollah must withdraw its forces to north of the Litani River. A five-country monitoring panel, led by the United States, would oversee the implementation, with 5,000 Lebanese troops deployed to ensure compliance. The agreement does not preclude either Israel or Lebanon from acting in self-defense, but Israeli and Lebanese officials disagreed with what that entails. Since the ceasefire went into effect, Lebanon's Ministry of Public Health claimed Israeli attacks on Lebanon killed at least 83 civilians, while Israel said dozens of Hezbollah fighters were killed in the midst of ceasefire violations. On 26 January 2025, the U.S. extended the agreement until 18 February. Once this deadline lapsed, Israel withdrew from populated areas in southern Lebanon but declared that it would temporarily remain in five "strategic" Lebanese positions along the border.

In November 2024, US envoy Amos Hochstein met with Lebanese and Israeli leaders to negotiate the ceasefire deal. In Lebanon, he met with Lebanese Speaker of the Parliament Nabih Berri, who had Hezbollah's support to negotiate. On 20 November, Hezbollah secretary-general Naim Qassem approved the deal. France was added as a mediator to the deal after it walked back on its statement that it would arrest Benjamin Netanyahu for alleged war crimes. After some delays from the Israeli side, Hochstein threatened to withdraw from negotiations unless Israel moved forward with the deal. On 26 November, Israel's security cabinet endorsed the agreement with a 10–1 vote. The ceasefire was hailed as a significant accomplishment for the Biden administration, with Joe Biden stating that the agreement was "designed to be a permanent cessation of hostilities".

The 2006 Lebanon war ended with UN Resolution 1701, which called for Israel to withdraw from Lebanon and for Hezbollah to disarm and withdraw north of the Litani River. However, it was violated by both sides, as Hezbollah continued to accumulate arms and failed to withdraw north and the Israeli military continued to violate Lebanese airspace in the absence of hostilities. Due to economic crises, lack of resources, and historic weakness compared to both Hezbollah and Israel, numerous concerns have been raised regarding the Lebanese Armed Forces' ability to enforce both Resolution 1701 and the 2024 ceasefire.

As of January 2026, Israel has been accused of at least 2,036 ceasefire violations, allegedly killing at least 15 people, including a Lebanese Army officer and several civilians. Israel said its attacks targeted Hezbollah fighters south of the Litani or imminent threats to its troops. Hezbollah has also violated the ceasefire on numerous instances by moving its fighters south of the Litani, and has fired on Israel Defense Forces at least once without causing casualties.

On 2 March 2026, the ceasefire effectively broke down amid the nascent 2026 Iran war, with Hezbollah launching strikes on Israel in retaliation for the latter's assassination of Iranian Supreme Leader Ali Khamenei.

== Background ==
Shortly after the onset of the Gaza war in October 2023, Hezbollah joined the conflict, citing solidarity with Palestinians. On 8 October 2023, Hezbollah started firing guided rockets and artillery shells at Israeli positions in the Shebaa Farms, which it said was in solidarity with Palestinians following the October 7 attacks 2023, and the beginning of Israeli bombing of the Gaza Strip. Israel retaliated by launching drone strikes and artillery shells at Hezbollah positions. Israel also carried out airstrikes throughout Lebanon and in Syria. This quickly escalated into regular cross-border military exchanges between Hezbollah and Israel, impacting northern Israel, southern Lebanon and the Golan Heights. Hezbollah said it aimed to pressure Israel by forcing it to fight on two fronts. Hezbollah has offered an immediate ceasefire should a ceasefire also happen in Gaza.

In September 2024, Israel carried out two waves of electronic device attacks targeting Hezbollah's communication systems and assassinated the group's leading figures, including killing secretary-general Hassan Nasrallah during a bombing on 27 September which destroyed Hezbollah's main headquarters in Beirut. On 1 October, the Israeli military began a full-scale invasion of southern Lebanon although it had been conducting limited ground operations for some time. Israeli operations led to the significant dismantling of Hezbollah's military infrastructure in southern Lebanon and the destruction of a large portion of its missile stockpile.

In northern Israel, the conflict forced approximately 96,000 individuals to leave their homes, while in Lebanon, over 1.4 million individuals have been displaced. Hezbollah stated it would not stop attacks against Israel until it stops its military operations in Gaza; Israel said its attacks would continue until its citizens could return safely to the north.

== Negotiation process ==
On 5 January 2024, then Hezbollah Secretary General Hassan Nasrallah called for negotiations on the demarcation of the border between Lebanon and Israel (also concerning the disputed Shebaa Farms territory). But he predicated these negotiations on a ceasefire in Gaza. In July 2024, Nasrallah again promised a ceasefire on the Lebanese border should a ceasefire also happen in Gaza. In June 2024, US envoy Amos Hochstein travelled to Lebanon to meet Lebanese Speaker of the Parliament Nabih Berri. He also met with Israeli Prime Minister Benjamin Netanyahu in Israel. Hochstein also made a similar visit in August. A Lebanese analyst stated at the time that Hezbollah had not expected the war in Gaza "to continue for so long".

On 25 September, the United States, European Union, Qatar and several other countries called for a 21-day ceasefire between Israel and Lebanon. Hezbollah leader Nasrallah expressed his agreement with this ceasefire proposal to the Lebanese Foreign Minister, but this was not communicated to the US State Department. On 27 September, Israel assassinated Nasrallah. A 60-day ceasefire was proposed in late October.

In November 2024, US envoy Amos Hochstein met with Lebanese and Israeli leaders to negotiate the ceasefire deal. In Lebanon, he met with Lebanese Speaker of the Parliament Nabih Berri, who had Hezbollah's support to negotiate. On 20 November, Hezbollah Secretary-General Naim Qassem said his organization had "provided feedback" on the proposed deal. France was added as a mediator to the deal after it walked back on its statement that it would arrest Benjamin Netanyahu for alleged war crimes. After some delays from the Israeli side, Hochstein threatened to withdraw from negotiations unless Israel moved forward with the deal. On 27 November, Israel's security cabinet endorsed the agreement with a 10–1 vote. The ceasefire was hailed as a significant accomplishment for the Biden Administration, with US President Joe Biden stating that the agreement was "designed to be a permanent cessation of hostilities."

== Agreement ==
On 26 November 2024, Prime Minister of Israel Benjamin Netanyahu announced the transfer of a ceasefire agreement to the Security Cabinet of Israel. The cabinet voted 10–1 in favor of approving the deal, with the sole opponent being National Security Minister Itamar Ben-Gvir.

The ceasefire agreement includes 13 clauses related to cessation of hostilities and responsibilities of the Lebanese and Israeli forces, whose content is summarized as:

1. "Israel and Lebanon will implement a cessation of hostilities beginning at 04:00 hours (IST/EET) on 27 November 2024."
2. "From the specified time, Lebanon will prevent Hezbollah and other armed groups from conducting operations against Israel. Israel will not carry out offensive military operations against Lebanese targets."
3. "Both nations recognize the importance of UNSCR 1701 for achieving lasting peace and security and commit to its full implementation without violation."
4. "Both nations retain the right of self-defense, consistent with international law."
5. The Lebanese army (LAF) and the Lebanese security forces will be the only armed groups in the Southern Litani area, as outlined in the LAF Deployment Plan."
6. "The Government of Lebanon will regulate and control the sale, supply, and production of arms and related materiel within Lebanon to prevent the rearmament of non-state groups."
7. "Lebanon's official military and security forces will monitor and enforce against unauthorized arms and related materiel, dismantle unauthorized facilities, and confiscate unauthorized arms, starting with the Southern Litani Area."
8. "The United States and France will work to enable the deployment of 10,000 LAF soldiers to southern Lebanon and support the LAF's capabilities."
9. "Israel and Lebanon will reformulate and enhance the tripartite mechanism, chaired by the US and including France, to monitor and verify the enforcement of these commitments."
10. "Both nations will report alleged violations to the tripartite mechanism and UNIFIL, with procedures developed for consultation and enforcement.
11. "Lebanon will deploy its official military and security forces to all borders and border crossings, setting up roadblocks and checkpoints along the Southern Litani Area."
12. Israel will withdraw its forces south of the Blue Line in a phased manner, coordinated with the LAF's deployment to the Southern Litani Area, within 60 days."
13. "The United States, with UN partnership, will facilitate indirect negotiations between Israel and Lebanon to resolve remaining disputed points along the Blue Line, consistent with UNSCR 1701."

According to Lebanese reports, a Lebanese government source reported that if no escalations or breaches of the agreement occur by 10 a.m. local time on 27 November 2024, the ceasefire agreement will go into effect. Prime Minister of Lebanon Najib Mikati issued strong support for the agreement and urged the international community to help implement the agreement immediately in order to "halt Israeli aggression".

== Violations ==
Israel has been accused of violating the ceasefire by the Lebanese government, by Hezbollah and by France. On 2 December, France reported that Israel had violated the ceasefire 52 times. Israeli attacks on Lebanon have killed 3 Lebanese civilians since the ceasefire went into effect. Israel has accused Hezbollah of violating the ceasefire and announced its forces would remain in southern Lebanon beyond the 60-day deadline due to the Lebanese army not fully deploying and in some places helping Hezbollah. As of 28 November, there were no reported instances of Hezbollah firing at Israel since the ceasefire took effect.

By November 2025, the Lebanese health ministry and the United Nations reported that more than 330 people, including 127 civilians, were killed and about 945 more were injured by Israeli forces since the ceasefire began. The United Nations Interim Force in Lebanon (UNIFIL) also reported that Israel has violated the ceasefire more than 10,000 times since November 2024.

Nevertheless, as of 27 December 2024, media reports that the ceasefire has largely continued to hold.

=== First violation ===
Conflicting claims have arisen on what the first violation of the ceasefire was. As per Israel, the first violation occurred on 27 November at 9:30 AM, at Kfar Kila, where "Hezbollah operatives reportedly entered the town of Kfar Kila, which is only a few kilometers from the border," including a local commander. Conflicting reports also arose on whether the four were arrested or driven away. In the same incident, Israeli artillery fired 5 shells towards the Fatima border gate near Khiyam.

By contrast, Lebanese state media claimed that the first violation of the ceasefire occurred on 27 November 2024, when Israeli forces opened fire on a group of journalists in the southern Lebanese town of Khiam, just hours after the ceasefire began. The journalists, including Abdelkader Bay, a video journalist, were reporting from the area when the shooting took place. Bay, along with another journalist from The Associated Press and one from Sputnik, were wounded by Israeli gunfire. Bay recounted hearing the sound of Israeli tanks withdrawing from the area, followed by the sounds of gunfire directed at the group of journalists as they were filming. Despite clearly being identifiable as journalists, they were targeted by Israeli soldiers. Another journalist, Ali Hachicho, who was not injured, described how the shots were fired as soon as the journalists began documenting the military activities. The incident was condemned by the Syndicate of Lebanese Press Editors, who marked it as the first violation of the ceasefire agreement.

=== By Hezbollah ===
According to Arab and Israeli sources, since the 2024 Ceasefire agreement, Hezbollah has been rearming itself and is constantly violating the agreement from day one. The organization is using Beirut seaport and the eastern smuggling routes to Syria. They have acquired missiles, rockets, antitank missiles and artillery. Reports also say that Hezbollah is manufacturing its own weapons, with its activity mainly in Beirut suburbs and the Bekaa Valley.

The IDF said suspects approached border areas which the ceasefire makes off-limits. They also identified activity in a Hezbollah facility used to hold medium-range rockets. The IDF also said that 2 Hezbollah members entered a site in Southern Lebanon used to fire dozens of rockets at Israel. The IDF also said that Hezbollah members attempted to reach no-go zones near the Israel-Lebanon border in violation of the ceasefire agreement. Other suspects were reported to have arrived in violation of the ceasefire to Southern Lebanon. On December 1, the IDF identified Hezbollah operatives who it claimed fired at them from a church in South Lebanon, and killed several.

=== By Israel ===
The day after the ceasefire, the IDF shot at civilians returning to Khiam and used drones in the area, with reports from Israeli Army Radio and Channel 12 News indicating several civilian deaths. The Lebanese army did not comment on the incident. On 28 November, Lebanon accused Israel of violating the ceasefire with airstrikes and shelling on several villages, resulting in two injuries from tank fire. The Israeli airstrike targeted Hezbollah militants north of the Litani River, an area outside the ceasefire agreement. Additionally, Israeli forces injured civilians in Al-Taybeh and Marjeyouan, demolished homes in southern Lebanon, and moved into areas that it previously hadn't reached.

On 17 October 2025, the UN rights office (OHCHR), states that despite the ceasefire, Israel continues to conduct almost daily attacks on Lebanese territory. These assaults have caused a rise in civilian deaths and injuries, as well as significant damage to infrastructure, homes, the environment, and vital agricultural areas that support civilian livelihoods. Since the truce started, Israel's Defense Forces have confirmed over 500 airstrikes targeting what they identify as Hezbollah positions. The Armed Conflict Location and Event Data (ACLED), a conflict monitoring organization, documented 330 airstrikes and artillery attacks by Israel between November 27 and January 10, along with 260 incidents of property destruction. Since the attacks on Lebanon began in October 2023, Israeli strikes have killed more than 4,000 people, injured nearly 17,000, and displaced over 92,000 individuals due to ongoing violence. The United Nations has confirmed 127 civilian casualties in Lebanon, including 71 men, 21 women, and 16 children. Furthermore, there have been at least 19 cases of civilians abducted by Israeli soldiers in southern Lebanon, which could lead to enforced disappearances.

Hassan Fadlallah, a member of the Lebanese Parliament, claimed that Israel targeted civilians seeking to return home. On 27 November, Nabih Berri, who negotiated the agreement from the Lebanese side, had told Lebanese refugees that they could return home. Meanwhile, Israeli PM Netanyahu instructed the Israeli army not to immediately allow refugees into villages near the border. The IDF said this was for their own safety. The IDF fired warning shots at vehicles approaching Kafr Kila, shot several people in Mais al-Jabal, and detained four Lebanese citizens it said were Hezbollah members. Despite the warnings, thousands of displaced Lebanese families began to return to their homes in southern Lebanon.

=== Attacks on civilians and infrastructure ===
The IDF has been accused of several instances of civilian targeting and/or civilian infrastructure destruction since the ceasefire. No such instances have been attributed to Hezbollah as of February 2025:

Date	Location	Description/Cause	Deaths	Injured
27 November 2024	Kafr Kila and Mais al-Jabal	The IDF shot at returning Lebanese civilians.	Unknown	Unknown
27–28 November 2024	Khiam and several other villages	The IDF shot at returning civilians in Khiam and flew drones in the area, allegedly killing several and wounding more. Additionally, IDF tanks wounded Lebanese civilians.	0	2
29 November 2024	Al-Taybeh	A drone strike targeting a civilian gathering at a square in Al-Taybeh and shelled areas of the Marjeyouan plain, injuring several people including a child.	0	3
29 November 2024	Tebna and Markaba	The IDF also allegedly demolished reportedly demolished numerous homes and moved in to the Tebnaarea. It also fired on civilians in a funeral. In Markaba, the IDF targeted a car with a drone-based airstrike.	0	3
29 November 2024		Israeli soldiers published a video of them deliberately running over and destroying ambulances in Southern Lebanon. On the same day, IDF forces pushed into areas of Lebanon which they had not previously entered with tanks and artillery, advancing on Markaba and Khiam. They reportedly began demolishing roads and buildings in the areas they occupied.	0	0
30 November 2024	Majdal Zoun	An Israeli drone attacked a car in Majdal Zoun, injuring civilians including a child.	0	3
2 December 2024	Haris	An Israeli strike on a house in Haris.	5	2
2 December 2024	Tallouseh	Several people were killed and injured by Israeli attacks in the town.	4	3
8 December 2024	Dibbin	An Israeli airstrike targeted civilians in Dibbin, South Lebanon.	3	0
26 January 2025	South Lebanon	At least 26 people have been killed by Israeli forces in South Lebanon, and injuring over a hundred more. The attacks came on the day when Israeli troops were supposed to withdraw from southern Lebanon and allow civilians to return home. The United States announced that the deadline for Israel to withdraw from Lebanon was extended to February 18.	26	100+
27 January 2025	South Lebanon	Israeli forces opened fire into several residents in South Lebanon, killing and injuring civilians, according to Lebanon's health ministry.	2	17
31 January 2025	Janta, Beqaa Valley	Several people were killed and injured by an Israeli airstrike.	2	10
8 February 2025	Beqaa Valley	Israel launched an air raid in eastern Beqaa Valley, where Israel claimed they were targeting Hezbollah "operatives".	6	2
13 February 2025	South Lebanon	The Israeli military destroyed several sites in southern Lebanon, allegedly because the sites housed weapons depots and missile launch platforms, according to a military statement.	0	0
14 February 2025	Nabatiyeh and Tyre	Israeli forces launched two airstrikes in areas of Nabatiyeh and Tyre.	0	0
15 February 2025	Iqlim al-Tuffah	An Israeli airstrike hit a car in Iqlim al-Tuffah, in southern Lebanon.	2	4
16 February 2025	Houla, Lebanon	Israeli forces opened fire upon civilians trying return to Houla, killing a woman.	1	Several
25 February 2025	Beqaa Valley	Two people were killed by an Israeli airstrike.	2	0
8 March 2025	South Lebanon	A Lebanese man was killed and another man was injured in an Israeli airstrike.	1	1
22 March 2025		Israeli forces launched rocket attacks into Lebanon, killing seven, including a child and injured 40 others.	7	40
28 March 2025	Kfar Tebnit and Beirut	Several people were killed by Israeli airstrikes in south Lebanon and Beirut.	3	18
1 April 2025	Beirut	An Israeli airstrike targeted Beirut.	4	7
18 April 2025	Sidon and a road between Ayta ash-Shaab and Rmaish	Israeli forces launched two separate drone strikes, killing two people. Israel claimed that both of them were members of Hezbollah.	2	0
27 April 2025	Dahieh, Beirut	Israel launched an airstrike on Dahieh, Beirut.	0	0
27 April 2025	Halta, Nabatieh	One person was killed by an Israeli airstrike.	1	0
1 May 2025	Mais al-Jabal	Three people, including two Syrian nationals, were killed on a vehicle by an Israeli attack. On that same day, a volunteer of the Lebanese Civil Defense was killed by a drone strike by Israel.	4	0
8 May 2025	Nabatieh Governorate	One person was killed while eight others were wounded in several locations by Israeli forces.	1	8
22 May 2025	Toul	One person was killed by an Israeli airstrike in southern Lebanon.	1	1
29 May 2025	Nabatieh al-Fawqa and Kfar Kila	Several airstrikes targeted south Lebanon, killing two people, including a municipal worker.	2	0
31 May 2025	Deir ez-Zahrani, Nabatieh Governorate	An Israeli attack targeted a Hezbollah member while he was in a vehicle, killing him.	1	0
27 June 2025	Kounin and Mahrouna	One person was killed in Kounin while two others were killed by Israeli attacks.	3	0
8 July 2025	Tripoli	Israeli forces targeted a vehicle in Tripoli.	3	13
15 July 2025	Beqaa Valley	Israeli airstrikes killed at least twelve people, five of them were Hezbollah members.	12	Unknown
21 September 2025	Bint Jbeil	Five people, including three children, were killed by an Israeli drone. Four of them had American citizenship.	5	2
11 October 2025	Msayleh, south Lebanon	Israeli strikes killed one person and injured seven others.	1	7
23 October 2025	Eastern and southern Lebanon	The Israeli military launched several airstrikes, claiming that it "struck several terrorist targets" including "a camp used for training Hezbollah militants". An elderly woman was one of the victims who was killed by the attacks.	4	Unknown
8 November 2025	Between Ain Aata and Shebaa.	Two people were killed in an Israeli air raid on a vehicle.	2	0
8 November 2025	Bint Jbeil and Baraashit	Two separate drone strikes targeted civilians in southern Lebanon, targeting a car in Bint Jbeil, injuring seven people and another car in Baraashit, killing one and injuring four others.	1	11
18 November 2025	Ain al-Hilweh refugee camp, Sidon	Israel claimed that it targeted a "Hamas training compound" that was being used "to prepare an attack" against Israel and its army.	13	Several
22 November 2025	Zawtar al-Sharqiyah	An Israeli airstrike targeted a man while driving in his vehicle. The Israeli military claimed that the man, identified by the National News Agency as Kamel Reda Qarnabash, was allegedly a member of Hezbollah.	1	0
4 December 2025	Southern Lebanon	Israeli forces carried out airstrikes in south Lebanon, less than a day after Israel and Lebanon held their first direct talks in decades. The IDF also ordered residents of Mjadel, Baraashit, Jbaa and Mahrouna to be evacuated, alleging that these locations were weapons warehouses belonging to Hezbollah.	0	0
22 December 2025	Sidon	Three people were killed by an Israeli attack in Sidon, with Israel claiming that it targeted Hezbollah members in the area.	3	0
11 January 2026	Bint Jbeil	Several Israeli strikes targeted southern Lebanon, killing one person in a car in Bint Jbeil. Israel claimed that the person was a member of Hezbollah.	1	0
25 January 2026	Khirbet Selm and Derdghaya	One person was killed and another was injured by an Israeli strike in Khirbet Selm while an Israeli strike targeted a school teacher in Derdghaya, killing him.	2	1
9 February 2026	Yanouh, Tyre	Three people, including a child and his father, who was a member of the Internal Security Forces. Israel stated that one of them was a member of Hezbollah.	3	0
20 February 2026	Beqaa Valley and Ain al-Hilweh	At least ten people were killed and 24 others were injured by Israeli attacks in the Beqaa Valley, with Israel said that the strikes targeted "command centres" in the area. In that same day, an Israeli attack targeted the Ain al-Hilweh refugee camp, killing two people.	12	24+
21 February 2026	Rayaq	Ten people, including eight Hezbollah members were killed, while at least 24 others, including three children, were injured by Israeli airstrikes.	10	24
26 February 2026	Beqaa Valley	The National News Agency reported that a 16-year-old Syrian boy was killed by Israeli strikes on Kfar Dan and 29 others were injured.	1	29

== Reactions ==
=== Lebanon ===
Prime Minister Najib Mikati called for unity in Lebanon after the "most cruel phase in Lebanese history", stressing that the Lebanese army should provide security in southern Lebanon and that Israel abides by the deal and withdraws from Lebanese territory. He said that he hoped for a "new page" after the ceasefire.

=== Hezbollah ===
In April 2025, Hezbollah signaled willingness to discuss disarmament with President Joseph Aoun, on the condition that Israel withdraws from five southern hilltop positions and halts its strikes. Aoun, under rising pressure, seeks to bring all weapons under state control. The group, weakened by the 2024 conflict, insists Israel must act first before any transfer of arms.

=== Israel ===
In a public announcement on Israeli television following deliberation of the ceasefire terms, Prime Minister Benjamin Netanyahu asserted his support for the deal on the basis that a ceasefire would allow the IDF to focus primarily on the Gaza war and towards the "Iranian threat". He stated that "we are changing the face of the region".

He further stated that the ceasefire was considered due to claimed Israeli success in the 2024 Israeli invasion of Lebanon because Hezbollah was "no longer the same group that launched a war against us", and that the Israeli Defense Forces had "set them back decades". He stated that the Israeli army had achieved many of its goals in the invasion and airstrikes by killing most of Hezbollah's leadership and destroying large numbers of Lebanese infrastructure linked to them.

Former Israeli consul-general and ambassador Alon Pinkas deemed the deal "unenforceable" due to it assuming that the Lebanese army will supervise weapon production and distribution. He described this assumption as "impossible" due to Hezbollah's independence from the Lebanese army in weapon distribution and inability to cooperate.

Israeli Security Minister and far-right politician Itamar Ben-Gvir expressed dissatisfaction with the ceasefire deal due to it not providing Israel with a "security belt", not allowing Israelis to return to Northern Israel, and not providing the Lebanese army resistance against Hezbollah.

=== Middle East ===
- Iran: Foreign ministry spokesman Esmail Baghaei welcomed the ceasefire agreement hoping it would end Israeli attacks on Lebanon.
- Palestinian Authority: The Palestinian presidency expressed hope that the ceasefire will "contribute to stopping the violence and instability that the region is suffering from."
- Hamas: Hamas stated that it is "committed to cooperating with any effort to reach a ceasefire in Gaza," and that it "appreciates" Hezbollah's right to form a deal protecting Lebanese people.
- Several Palestinian citizens expressed significant concern over the potential ceasefire agreement allowing Israel to direct all its military forces towards bombardments and invasions in the Gaza Strip, exacerbating an already severe humanitarian crisis.

Al Jazeera political analyst Marwan Bishara called the deal a "very temporary, fragile truce" due to it allowing Israel to resume military operations at any perceived provocation by Hezbollah and Israel's continued commitment to breaking down Hezbollah.

=== International ===
- United States: Secretary of State Antony Blinken, praised the agreement and spoke with optimism that this ceasefire could also be a framework for a ceasefire in Gaza. President Joe Biden and French President Emmanuel Macron released a joint statement praising the agreement, saying that it will "secure Israel from the threat of Hezbollah and other terrorist organizations operating from Lebanon".
- United Kingdom: Prime Minister Keir Starmer praised a "long overdue" ceasefire that would "provide some measure of relief to the civilian populations" of Lebanon and Israel.
- Germany: Chancellor Olaf Scholz offered his support for the ceasefire and stressed the importance that all sides stick "to what has been agreed".
- Pakistan: Prime Minister Shehbaz Sharif welcomed the ceasefire and called for security for the Lebanese people. Pakistan also called for an end to the Israeli attacks in Gaza.
- Sri Lanka: The Ministry of Foreign Affairs issued a statement stating "We remain hopeful that the ceasefire will pave the way for enduring peace and stability in Lebanon and the region".
- European Union: President of the European Commission Ursula von der Leyen called the ceasefire "very encouraging news," noting it offers Lebanon a chance to bolster its internal security and stability by limiting Hezbollah's influence.
- United Nations: A top official confirmed the ceasefire and warned that "considerable work lies ahead" to implement the ceasefire deal.
- Uruguay: The Foreign Ministry issued a statement in which it reported that the Uruguayan government welcomed the ceasefire as a necessary opportunity for peace and the recovery of regional stability. It emphasized Uruguay's commitment to international efforts towards a lasting peace, for which it insists on the urgency of also reaching a political agreement on other fronts that would allow the release of hostages, the ceasefire in Gaza and the entry of more humanitarian aid.

=== Analysts ===
Many Lebanese are eager for an end to the conflict, but concerns persist that Hezbollah may disregard the ceasefire and rearm in southern Lebanon. On the Israeli side, the prolonged displacement of civilians near the border and the strain on the military continue to drive the need for a solution.

Writing for the Institute for the Study of War, Brian Carter argued that the ceasefire agreement represented a significant military victory for Israel. In his analysis, Israel had dealt severe damage to Hezbollah and achieved its key objectives, while forcing Hezbollah to concede its own stated objective (to force an end to the Gaza war). While arguing that the war and the resulting agreement had significantly shifted the strategic situation in Israel's favor, he also stated that Hezbollah would almost certainly attempt to rebuild its strength.

According to The New York Times, Hezbollah abandoning its demand that they would accept a ceasefire only if Israel stopped attacking Gaza, and agreeing to give an oversight role to the United States, were signs that they were desperate to stop the war.

== See also ==
- May 17 Agreement
- 2023 Gaza war ceasefire
- January 2025 Gaza war ceasefire
- Disarmament of Hezbollah
- International Monitoring and Implementation Mechanism (IMIM)
- 2026 Israel–Lebanon peace talks
- 2026 Israel–Lebanon Framework Agreement
