= Kanso =

Kanso (also spelled Qanso, Ganso, Cansu, Qansuh, Anso) is a surname. Notable people with the surname include:

- Al-Ashraf Qansuh Al-Ghuri, Soultan of egypt
- Ali Qanso, Lebanese politician
- Assem Qanso, Lebanese politician
- Eva Kanso, Lebanese-American mechanical engineer
- Nabil Kanso, Lebanese-American painter
