= Braiqaa =

Braiqaa بريقع
- Municipality
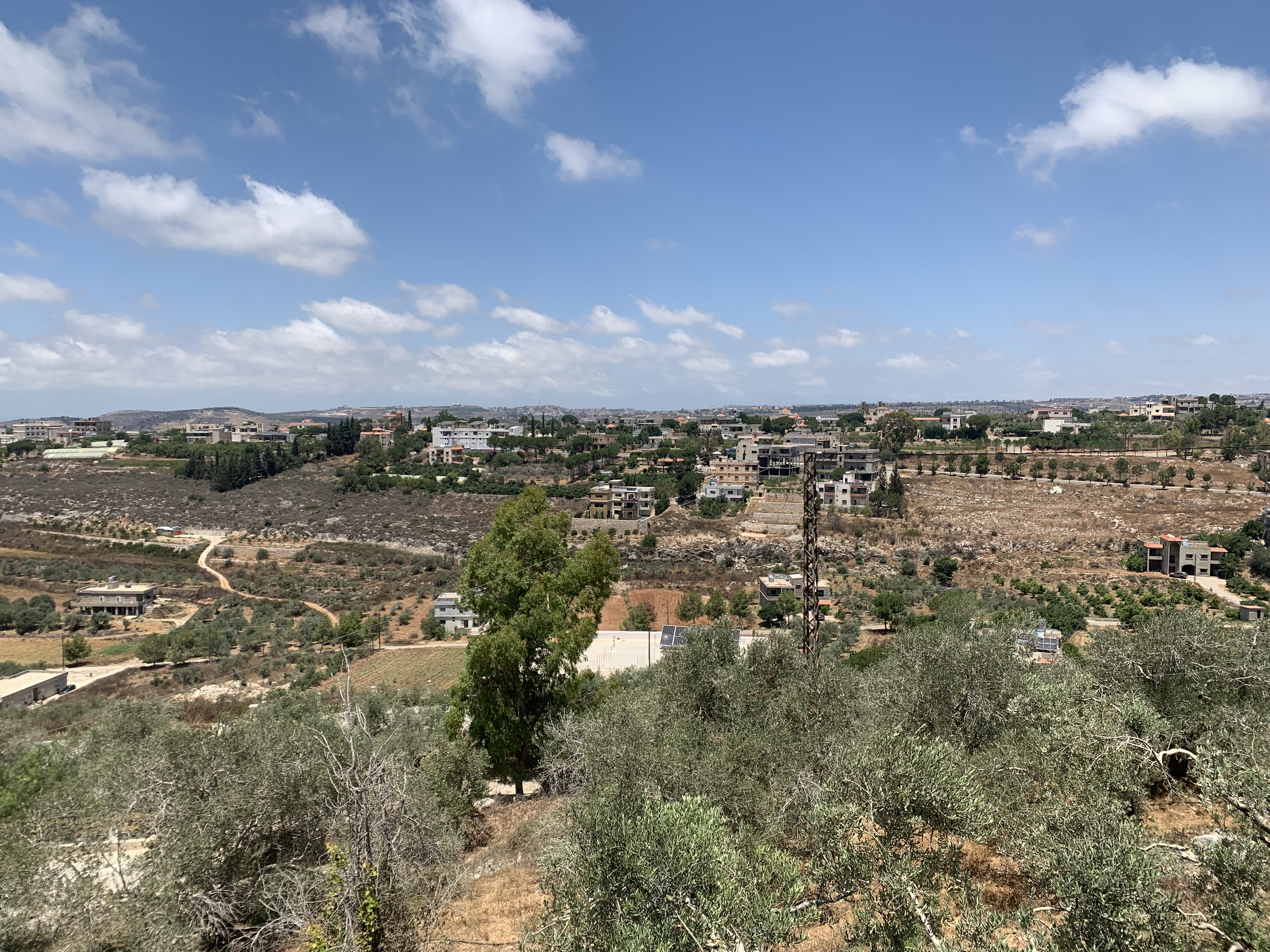
- Image of Braiqaa from a hill in the village

- Location within Lebanon
- Coordinates: 33°20′27″N 35°23′00″E
- Country: Lebanon
- Governorate: Nabatieh Governorate
- District: Nabatieh District

Government
  - Mayor: Hussein Mrad
- Time zone: UTC+2 (EET)
  - Summer (DST): UTC+3 (EEST)

Braiqaa (Arabic: بريقع) is a municipality in the Nabatieh District in Lebanon.

== History ==
In 1875, Victor Guérin noted about the village (which he called Breika): "I reach Breika, a village of 250 inhabitants, most of them Metualis. A few Christian families, "United Greeks" or Maronites, occupy a separate district. At the bottom of the village, towards the east, I am shown the site of an old church built with enormous blocks that are rather badly squared. I would rather be disposed to see the remains of an ancient defensive tower, rectangular in shape. In any case, the interior is full of graves, as this is where the Christians of Kouseibeh and Breika used to bury their dead."

== Demographics ==
In 2014, Muslims made up 99.59% of registered voters in Braiqaa. 98.78% of the voters were Shiite Muslims.

== Bibliography ==
- Guérin, V. (1880). Description Géographique Historique et Archéologique de la Palestine (in French). Vol. 3: Galilee, pt. 2. Paris: L'Imprimerie Nationale.
