= Kfour =

Kfour could refer to the following places:

- Al-Kfour, Nabatieh
- Kfour, Keserwan
