= Nabil Qaouk =

Lebanese cleric and politician (1964–2024)

- نبيل قاووق
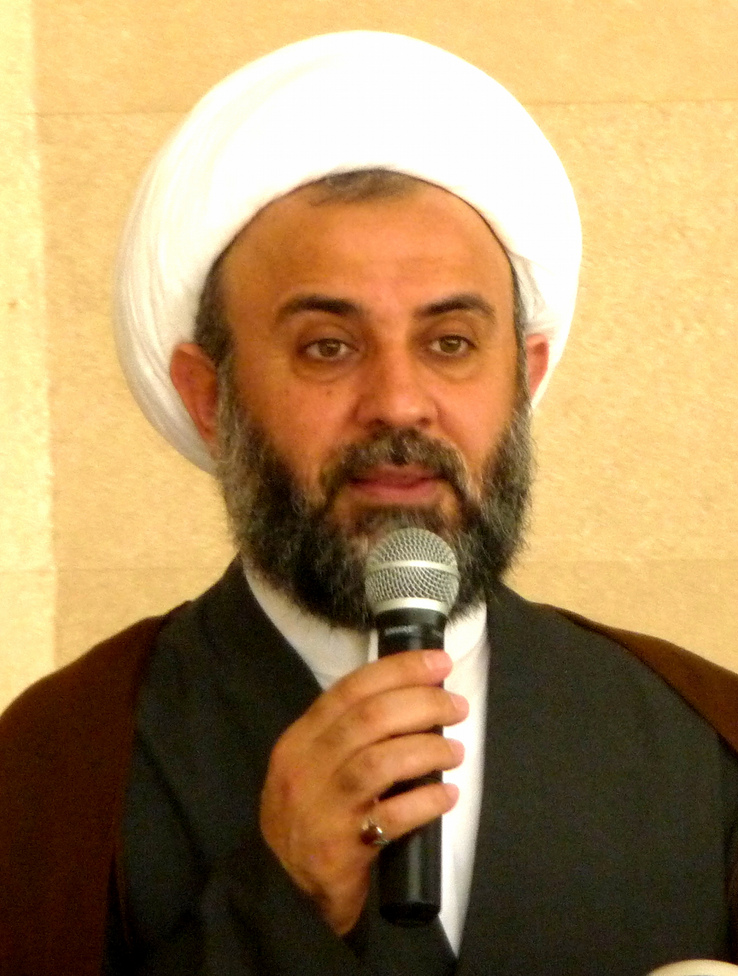
- Qaouk in 2010

Deputy Head of Hezbollah's Executive Council
- In office 2010 – 28 September 2024

Personal details
- Born: 20 May 1964 Ebba, Lebanon
- Died: 28 September 2024 (aged 60) Dahieh, Lebanon
- Cause of death: Assassination by airstrike
- Party: Hezbollah
- Children: 6
- Occupation: Politician, cleric

Nabil Qaouk (Arabic: نبيل قاووق; 20 May 1964 – 28 September 2024) was a Lebanese cleric and politician who served as the deputy head of Hezbollah's executive council and the commander of Hezbollah's "preventive security unit." He was designated as a Specially Designated Global Terrorist by the U.S. Department of the Treasury's Office of Foreign Assets Control (OFAC).

== Biography ==
=== Early life and education ===
Nabil Qaouk was born in the village of Ebba in Lebanon's Nabatieh Governorate. His spiritual studies took place in Qom, Iran, where he was influenced by Shia ideology. His military training in Iran aligned with Hezbollah and the Islamic Revolutionary Guard Corps (IRGC)

=== Career ===
Qaouk was one of the top officers of Hezbollah in Southern Lebanon, a region that has been a focal point in Hezbollah's confrontations. He was a general and deputy head of the executive council, attesting to his influence in Hezbollah's political and military factions.

On 22 October 2020, Qaouk was designated a Specially Designated Global Terrorist by the U.S. Department of the Treasury's Office of Foreign Assets Control (OFAC). This designation implies U.S. government sanctions against him due to alleged involvement in terrorism-related activities.

=== Attacks ===
During the 2006 Lebanon War, Qaouk's offices in Tyre were targeted by the Israeli Air Force (IAF). This activity was part of the Israeli military's broader response to Hezbollah's armed provocations, including the kidnapping of Israeli soldiers and the launch of rockets into Israeli territory.

=== Personal life and death ===
Qaouk was married and had six children. He was killed in an Israeli air strike in Beirut on 28 September 2024.
