= Abdel Karim Obeid =

Lebanese imam

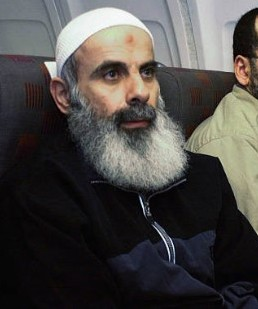
- Obeid in 2004
- Born: 1957 (age 68–69); Jebchit, Lebanon
- Occupations: Imam, sheikh
- Known for: Abduction by Israeli commandos

Abdel Karim Obeid (/ˈæbdʊl ˈkɑːriːm oʊˈbeɪd/; Arabic: الشيخ عبد الكريم عبيد; born 1957) is a Sheikh and Imam of the village of Jibchit in southern Lebanon, high-place of Lebanese Shiism. He is also a member of Hezbollah's Executive Council.

== Life ==
Regarded as the spiritual leader and soldier of the 'Islamic Amal' (no relation with the similarly named secular Amal movement, except that both catered to the Lebanese Shia community) in the south of Tyre, close to Hezbollah and related to the operations of capturing Western hostages since 1982.

Obeid was kidnapped on 28 July 1989 by nearly 25 Israeli commandos in his village, Jibchit. Danny Abdalla, a Lebanese criminal living in Denmark, who also admitted to having killed militant Ragheb Harb on behalf of the Israelis, claimed to have participated in the kidnapping. As a result, Hezbollah put Abdalla on their death list, and he was wanted in Lebanon as of 2012. Obeid was a long time held prisoner in Israel.

In exchange of his release, Israel required information on the fate of the navigator Ron Arad (crashed in southern Lebanon in October 1986) at first, and later on for the bodies of the three soldiers abducted by Hezbollah in October 2000 at the Israeli-Lebanese border and for Elhanan Tannenbaum, who had been kidnapped at the same time in Dubai.

He was released in January 2004 with 20 other Lebanese prisoners, 400 Palestinian prisoners, and a number of other nationals, as part of a deal to get the abducted soldiers and civilians back. He thanked Hezbollah and Iranian government officials for acting for his release.

== See also ==
- List of kidnappings
- Jihad Council
