= Ragheb Harb =

Lebanese cleric (1952–1984)

Imam; Hujjat al-Islam; Ragheb Harb راغب حرب

Personal details
- Born: 1952 Jibchit, Lebanon
- Died: 16 February 1984 (aged 31–32) Jibchit, Lebanon
- Cause of death: Assassination
- Party: Amal Movement (1975–1984)
- Profession: Cleric; politician

Ragheb Harb (Arabic: راغب حرب; 1952 – 16 February 1984) was a Lebanese Shia Muslim cleric and politician. He was an Imam who led resistance against the Israeli occupation of Lebanon, thus becoming a face for popular resistance, including being a leader in Amal Movement. In March 1983, he was detained by the Israel Defense Forces, but following wide spread demonstrations throughout southern Lebanon, he was released seventeen days later.

== Early life ==
Harb was born into a Shia Muslim family in the town of Jibchit in the Nabatieh District. He left school at the age of seventeen to undertake religious studies, which prompted him to move to Beirut in 1969. He traveled to Najaf in 1971, where he took courses from the prominent Muhammad Baqir al-Sadr, and returned to Lebanon in 1974 after three years. Harb started teaching religion and leading the friday prayer in Jibchit, and although few, his crowd grew so much that Jibchit's mosque came to be known as the "Qom of Jabal Amel. In 1976, Harb moved to the town of Sharqiyyeh where he strove to counter the influence of the Iraqi Baath, which had been growing among Shiites. He established a school for the locals, and took care of the area's orphans in his own house. By 1978, he had also started a charity (mabarra).

== Assassination ==
On 16 February 1984, he was assassinated. Hussein Abbas, one of the assassins, fled to America where he lived in the home of his uncle, the academic Professor Fouad Ajami.

Danny Abdallah, a Lebanese criminal living in Denmark, admitted to having killed Harb on behalf of the Israelis. As a result, Amal Movement put him on their death list, and he is wanted in Lebanon.

== See also ==
- List of assassinated Lebanese people
