= Zeinab Mokalled =

Lebanese environmentalist

Zeinab Mokalled (born 1936 in Jarjouaa) is a Lebanese environmental activist.

She earned a teacher's certificate. She taught at the Al-Musaytbeh School and the Arabsalim Public School.

She founded the NGO Nedaa Al-Ard ('the call of the Earth'), to do trash collection and recycling, when the municipal government failed. She organized composting with assistance from the United Nations Development Programme's "Environmentally Friendly Ideas" project. Her movement became a model for Lebanon.
