= Al-Kfour, Nabatieh =

Al-Kfour الكفور
- Municipality
- Location within Lebanon
- Coordinates: 33°23′50″N 35°27′04″E
- Country: Lebanon
- Governorate: Nabatieh Governorate
- District: Nabatieh District
- Time zone: UTC+2 (EET)
  - Summer (DST): UTC+3 (EEST)

Al-Kfour (Arabic: الكفور, romanized: al-Kfūr) is a municipality in the Nabatieh District in Lebanon.

== History ==
In 1875, Victor Guérin noted: "To the north of Toul, at a short distance from this hamlet, I see on another hill the village of Kfur, inhabited both by Metualis and by united Greeks".

== Demographics ==
In 2014, Muslims made up 57.05% and Christians made up 42.42% of registered voters in Al-Kfour. 50.53% of the voters were Shiite Muslims and 38.61% were Maronite Catholics.

== Bibliography ==
- Guérin, V. (1880). Description Géographique Historique et Archéologique de la Palestine (in French). Vol. 3: Galilee, pt. 2. Paris: L'Imprimerie Nationale.
