= Kfar Sir =

Kfar Sir كفرصير
- Municipality
- Location in Lebanon
- Coordinates: 33°19′30″N 35°24′03″E
- Grid position: 118/154 L
- Country: Lebanon
- Governorate: Nabatieh Governorate
- District: Nabatieh District
- Time zone: UTC+2 (EET)
  - Summer (DST): +3
- Area code: +961 - (07 - South Lebanon)

Kfar Sir or Kfarsir (Arabic: كفرصير, romanized: Kfarṣīr) is a municipality just north of the Litani River, in the Nabatieh District in southern Lebanon.

== History ==
In the 1596 tax records, it was named as a village, Kafr Tir, in the Ottoman nahiya (subdistrict) of Sagif under the liwa' (district) of Safad, with a population of 58 households and 5 bachelors, all Muslim. The villagers paid a fixed tax-rate of 25% on agricultural products, such as wheat, barley, olive trees, goats and beehives, in addition to "occasional revenues" and a press for olive oil or grape syrup; a total of 6,231 akçe.

== Demographics ==
In 2014 Muslims made up 99.36% of registered voters in Kfar Sir. 98.99% of the voters were Shiite Muslims.

== Bibliography ==
- Hütteroth, W.-D.; Abdulfattah, K. (1977). Historical Geography of Palestine, Transjordan and Southern Syria in the Late 16th Century. Erlanger Geographische Arbeiten, Sonderband 5. Erlangen, Germany: Vorstand der Fränkischen Geographischen Gesellschaft. ISBN 3-920405-41-2.
- Rhode, H. (1979). Administration and Population of the Sancak of Safed in the Sixteenth Century (PhD). Columbia University. Archived from the original on 2020-03-01.
