= Assaad Hardan =

Lebanese politician

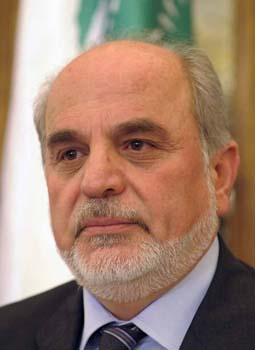
- Assaad Hardan in 2012

President of the Syrian Social Nationalist Party
- In office July 2008 – August 2016
- Preceded by: Ali Qanso
- Succeeded by: Ali Qonso

Personal details
- Born: 31 July 1951 (age 75) Rachaya Al Foukhar, Lebanon
- Party: Syrian Social Nationalist Party (Hardan faction)
- Spouse: Marlene Khnaisser
- Children: 5
- Education: Lebanese University
- Profession: politician

Assaad Hardan (Arabic: أسعد حردان, born 31 July 1951 in Rachaya Al Foukhar) is a Lebanese politician and the former leader of the Syrian Social Nationalist Party in Lebanon, and leader of the party’s Hardan faction. He joined the Syrian Social Nationalist Party in 1968 and became leader of the Central Political Bureau in 2016.

== Career ==
He was elected in 1992 a member of the Lebanese Parliament representing the Greek Orthodox seat from the Marjeyoun-Hasbaya district on the Amal/Hizballah ticket and has been named repeatedly to the government: Minister of State without portfolio between 1990 and 1992 (government of Omar Karami and Rachid Solh), Minister of Labour between 1995 and 1998 and between 2003 and 2004, he was succeeded by Assem Qanso in 2004.

He eventually lost his seat after the 2022 Lebanese general election and was replaced by Elias Jrade, an ideologically communist member of a 13-member October 17 reformist bloc.
