= Wissam Saleh =

Lebanese footballer (born 1993)

Personal information
- Full name: Wissam Khodor Saleh
- Date of birth: 2 August 1993 (age 33)
- Place of birth: Aadchit El Chqif, Lebanon
- Height: 1.69 m (5 ft 7 in)
- Position: Midfielder

Youth career
- Shabab Arabi

Senior career*
| Years | Team | Apps | (Gls) |
| –2013 | Shabab Arabi | | |
| 2013–2017 | Ansar | 36 | (0) |
| 2017–2018 | Safa | 0 | (0) |
| 2018–2019 | Shabab Arabi | | |
| Total | | 36 | (0) |

International career
| 2015 | Lebanon U23 | 1 | (0) |
| 2014 | Lebanon | 1 | (0) |
- * Club domestic league appearances and goals

Wissam Khodor Saleh (Arabic: وسام خضر صالح; born 2 August 1993) is a Lebanese former footballer who played as a midfielder.

== Club career ==
Coming through the youth sector, Saleh began his career at Shabab Arabi. In July 2013, he joined Ansar. In July 2019, Saleh was released by Shabab Arabi.

== International career ==
Saleh represented Lebanon internationally at youth level. In 2015, he played for the under-23 team in a friendly game against Kuwait. He also played once in the 2016 AFC U-23 Championship qualification.

== Style of play ==
Saleh could play as either a right-back or midfielder.

== Honours ==
Ansar

- Lebanese FA Cup: 2016–17
- Lebanese Elite Cup: 2016
