= Rammal Rammal =

- Born: Rammal Rammal; September 30, 1951; Doueir, Lebanon
- Died: May 31, 1991 (aged 39); France
- Education: Joseph Fourier University (now part of Université Grenoble Alpes)

Rammal Rammal (Arabic: رمال رمال; September 30, 1951 – May 31, 1991) was a Lebanese condensed matter physicist. He was born in Doueir, South Lebanon. He lived and went to school in Beirut. He was the top student in his class. He graduated high school and ranked first place in the official exams of the baccalaureate Section II (general science) in Lebanon. At 18 years old, he traveled to France to continue his education and start his scientific career. He studied at the Joseph Fourier University in France and got his baccalaureate in mathematics and physics. In 1981, he achieved his international doctorate there and started working at CNRS in Grenoble. Rammal continued working in France for most of his professional life.

== Career ==
Between 1978 and 1981, Rammal worked as a researcher at the National Center for Scientific Research (CNRS) in low-temperature physics department. He had a thesis that it subject addressed as follows: "The importance of statistical mechanics to explain the energy distribution in solids transparent (amorphous) spiral shape using numerical methods", this thesis was discussed in front of 16 scientists, senior physicists in France and it was a subject of appreciation and admiration prompting then the French Prime Minister Jacques Chirac to meet student researcher Rammal Rammal. This thesis has caused a major stir in the academic community and in France.

Rammal became famous all around the world, he went to many important universities in the United States as a visiting professor and an especially in the US space agency, "NASA".

During 1983–1984, Rammal served as a visiting professor for six months in Nuclear Physics, co-managing the University of Pennsylvania in Philadelphia Research Department (United States) and Brookhaven National Laboratory in Upton, New York. He had also served as a visiting professor for another six months in the Department of Physics at the University of Sherbrooke in Quebec, Canada.

During 1984–1986, he served as a research professor at the National Center for Scientific Research at the University of Grenoble.

Rammal was deputed by the French National Center for Research for representation in several scientific conferences in France and internationally.

Dr. Rammal has published 113 scientific researches in the topics of statistical physics research (Mathematics, thermodynamic, laws of motion applications specific heat in solids, liquids and gases, molecular hydrogen gas behavior in the lower temperature limits, extreme behavior of nuclear particles in the microscopic tropical systems, characteristics of the Fermi-Dirac statistics, etc. ..). Dr. Rammal research has contributed to build the basics and origins of modern physics and development. As a result of the importance of his research, the National Center for Scientific Research awarded him a bronze medal in 1984, in recognition of the best doctoral thesis in France. In addition, the French government awarded a silver medal for Scientific Research, and it was presented by the French Minister of education himself in 1988, in recognition of his research in the fields of statistical physics.

In 1989, the French magazine Le Point included Rammal's name in an article on December 11, 1989, among the one hundred French figures representing the glory of France. He was named among the top twenty French character who will play an important role in changing France in the 2000s. And as the magazine mentioned: "Dr. Rammal Rammal was a mathematician-physicist of Lebanese origin, and one of the leading specialists of the few at the global level in the intensification of material and energy storage research areas."

== Awards ==
- The Rammal Award for scientists from Mediterranean countries was created in his honor by the EuroScience organization and has been awarded annually since 1993.
- Rammal Rammal high school was built in his hometown Doueir for his honor.
- The science and research States magazine awarded him in 1984, the smallest researcher in the world of his generation.
- the French government awarded him a silver medal for Scientific Research.
- the French magazine Le Point named him among the top twenty French character who will play an important role in changing France in the 2000s.
- the National Center for Scientific Research awarded him a bronze medal in 1984, in recognition of the best doctoral thesis in France

== Death ==
On May 31, 1991, Rammal Rammal died in France, and was buried in his hometown. There was speculation of foul play involved in the death of Rammal, but no proof was presented to support these speculations. French authorities that accompanied his body to Lebanon did not allow him to disclose.
