= January 2025 southern Lebanon attack =

Israeli killing of civilians

January 2025 southern Lebanon killings
- Part of the aftermath of the 2024 Lebanon war
- Location: Kfar Kila, Lebanon
- Date: January 26–27, 2025
- Deaths: 26: 25 civilians, one Lebanese Army soldier
- Injuries: 147+
- Perpetrator: Israeli Ground Forces
- Motive: Civilians returning to their hometowns against Israeli orders not to

On the morning of January 26, 2025, unarmed displaced Lebanese civilians from southern villages, returned home from the north after Israel Defense Forces refused to leave the occupied areas in southern Lebanon. Israeli troops had to leave the occupied areas as per the agreed ceasefire with Hezbollah, which lasted for 60 days. Israeli troops opened fire on civilians, killing at least 26 people and wounding about 147 others. Gunfire also erupted at soldiers of the Lebanese Army, resulting in the killing of a soldier and the wounding of others.

A day later, Israeli troops opened fire again against civilians, killing two and wounding 17.
