= Said Fayad =

Lebanese journalist and poet (1921–2003)

Mohammad Said Ibrahim Efendi Fayad (Arabic: سعيد فياض; 1921–2003) known as Said Fayad, was a Lebanese poet and literary journalist from the village of Ansar in the Nabatieh Governorate of southern Lebanon.

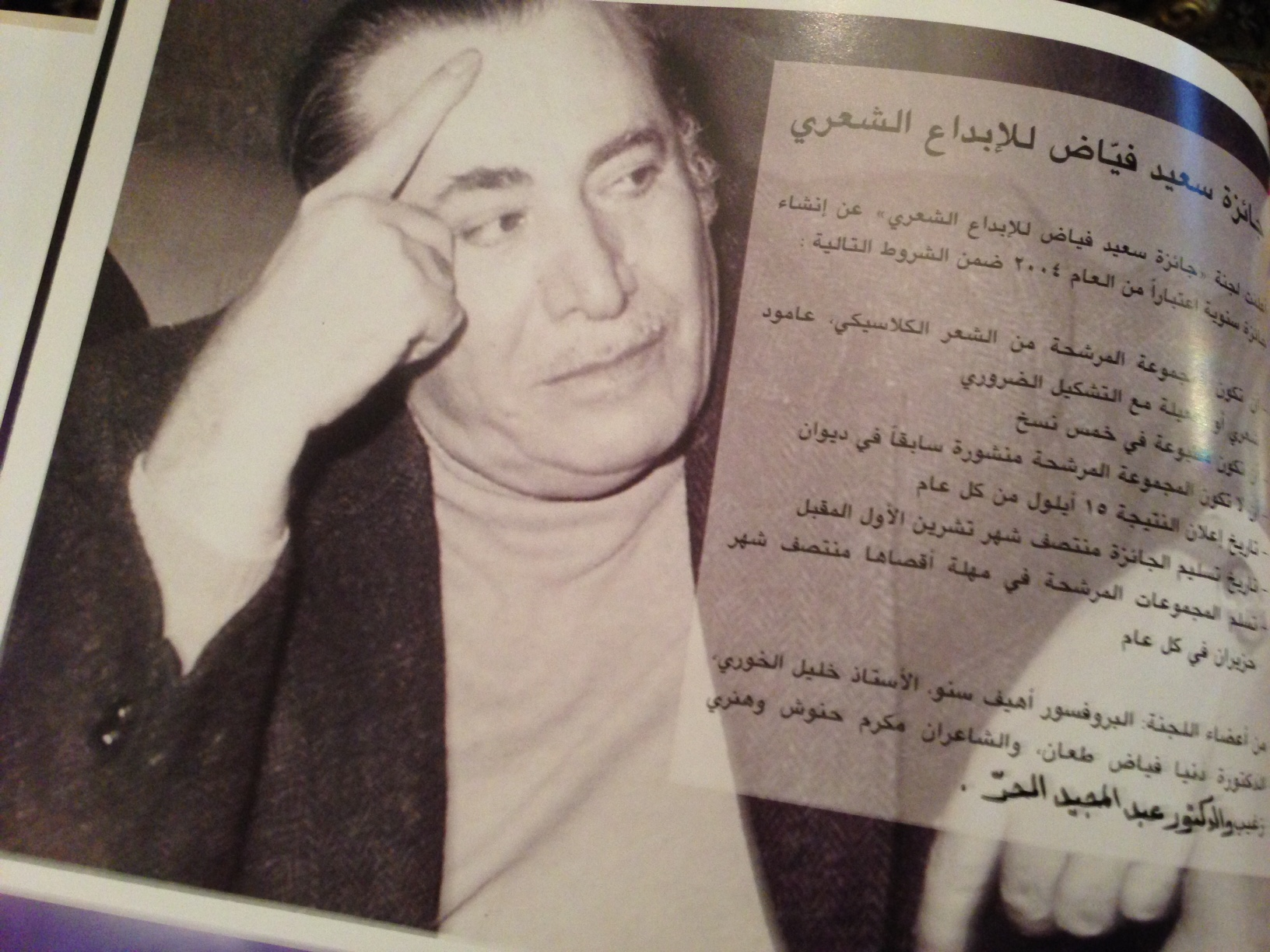
Said Fayad

== Personal life ==
Fayad was the eldest son of Ibrahim Efendi Fayad, a local notable who served as a district governor under the French mandate, and Lamia Ali Dhaher, niece of the poet and religious figure Sheikh Suleiman Dhaher, an intellectual in the Nabatieh governorate.

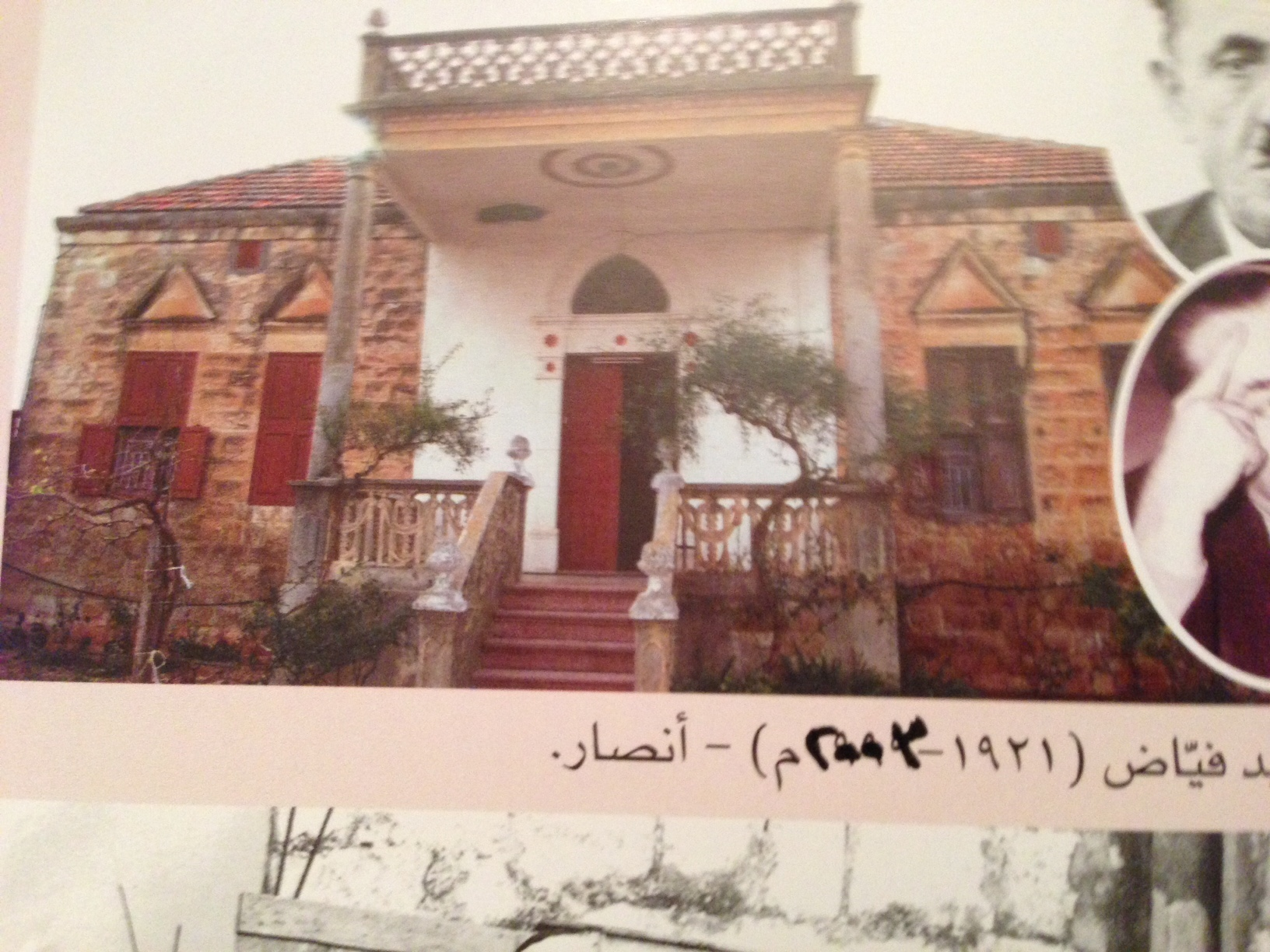
Ansar home

Said was schooled in Nabatieh, Hasbaya, the Maqased in Saida and the Freres.

He married Badriya Fayad and they had eight children: Afaf (step-daughter), Talal, Hilal, Daad, Dalal, Dunia, Ghada and Randa.

He spent most of his career between Lebanon and Saudi Arabia and then after retirement lived in Switzerland, the United Kingdom and Morocco. He returned to Lebanon in the late 1990s where he died on 15 October 2003.

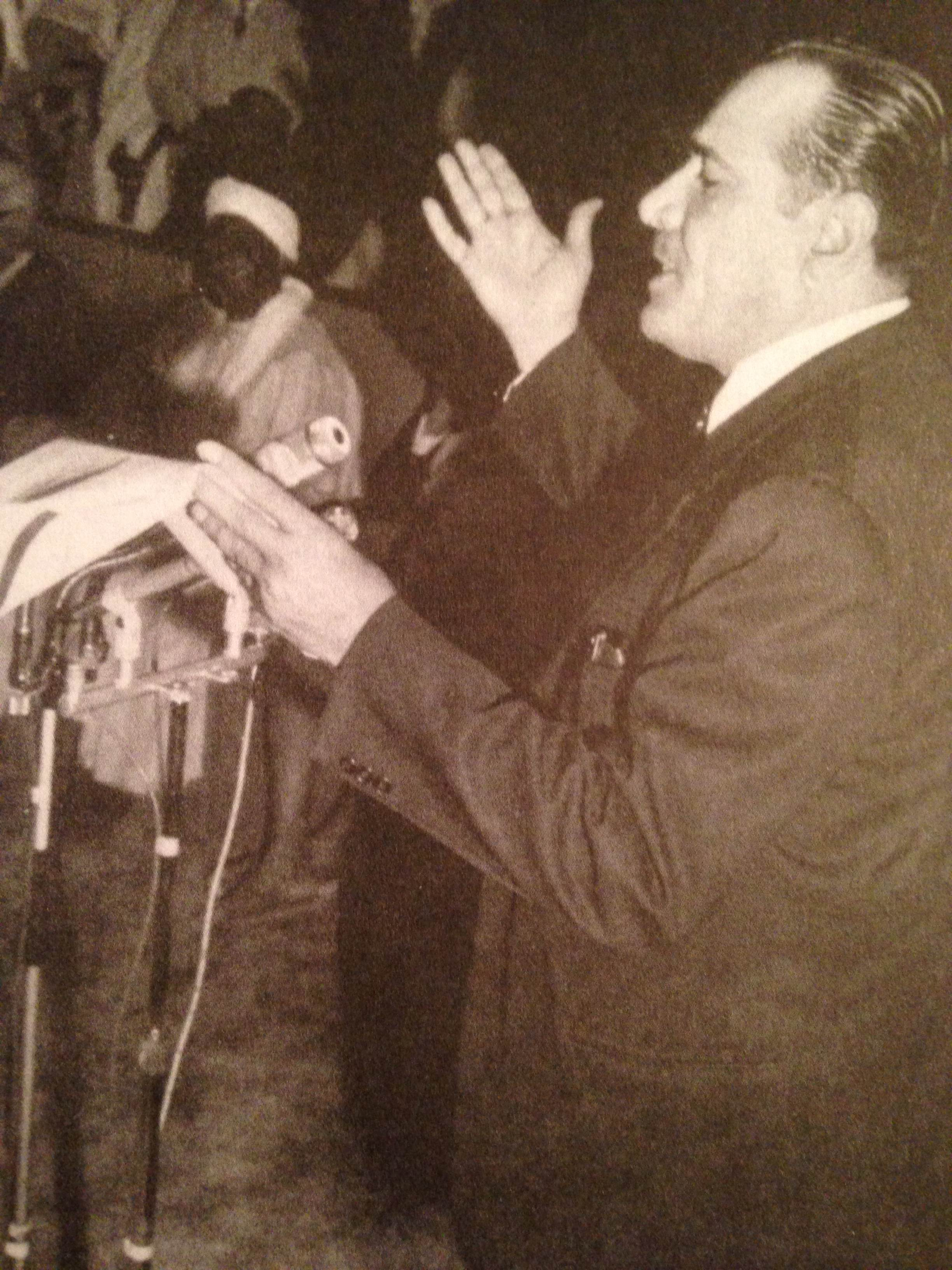
الشاعر سعيد فياض اثناء القاء قصيدة "لا العيد عيدي" في مِنى في موسم الحج بعد نكبة حزيران عام ١٩٦٧ م

== Career ==
Said began his career in Saudi Arabia with al-Riyad Magazine and Saudi Radio in Mecca. He then returned to Beirut as a correspondent for Saudi Radio and wrote for the newspapers al-Hadaf and al-Rased from 1958 to 1968. His poems were published in magazines including Al-Wuroud, Al-Irfan and Al Adab.

He also produced some programmes for Lebanese radio, including Fairuz Shah (Arabic فيروز شاه) and Hamza al-Arab (Arabic حمزة العرب).

In 1963, he returned to Jeddah to work for the radio broadcasting office where he produced the daily radio programmes With the People (Arabic مع الناس), Wisdom of the Day (Arabic حكمة اليوم), and Afternoon Sun (Arabic شمس الأصيل) until his retirement in 1975 for medical reasons. He wrote the Saudi national anthem (بلادي بلادي منار الهدى]).

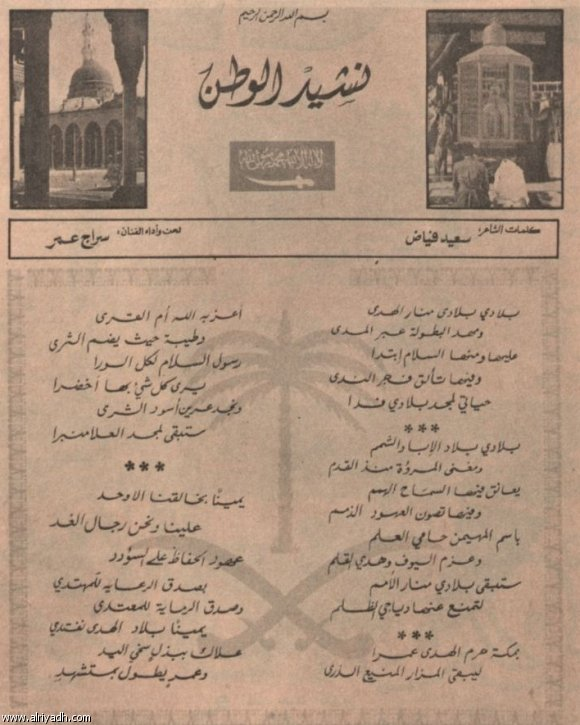
Saudi national anthem

In 1975, he moved to London, then in 1985 to Switzerland. From 1988 to 1996 he lived in Morocco in a suburb of Casablanca, close to his eldest son. He returned to Lebanon in the late 1990s where he continued to write poetry, as well as his memoirs.

Pierre Khabbaz (د. بيار خباز) of the Lebanese University published a study of his works in 1998 (سعيد فياض شاعرا - دراسة جمالية نفسية).

== Said Fayad Literary Prize ==
جائزة سعيد فياض للإبداع الشعري

Since 2004, the Said Fayad Literary Prize (Arabic جائزة سعيد فيّاض للإبداع الشعري) has been awarded annually in Beirut to promote and encourage excellence in Arab poetry. The prize is worth 5,000,000 Lebanese Lira (US$3,333).

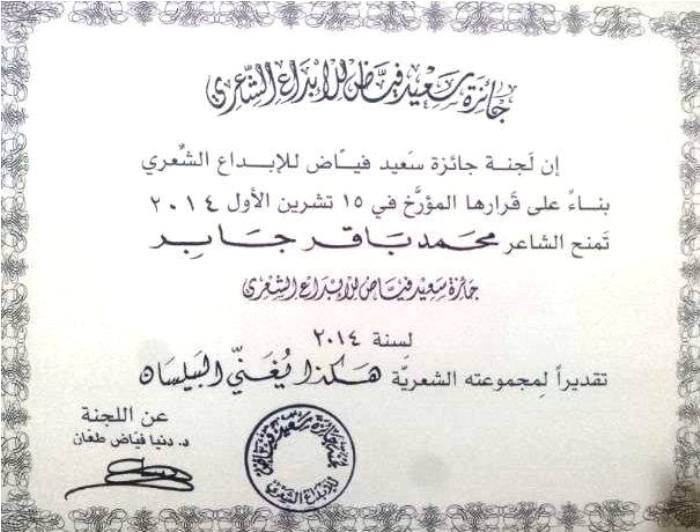
Winner 2014 - Mohammad Baqer Jabed

== Poetry ==
Major poetic works include:

- Blossoms براعم 1951
- Bouquet 1955 عبير
- Clarion Call of Affection 1984 هتاف الوجدان

== Prose ==
He produced two anthologies of articles and works in prose:

- Moving images 1956 صور متحركة
- On the paths of life 1985 على دروب الحياة
