= Al-Numairiyah =

Al-Numairiyah النميرية
- Municipality
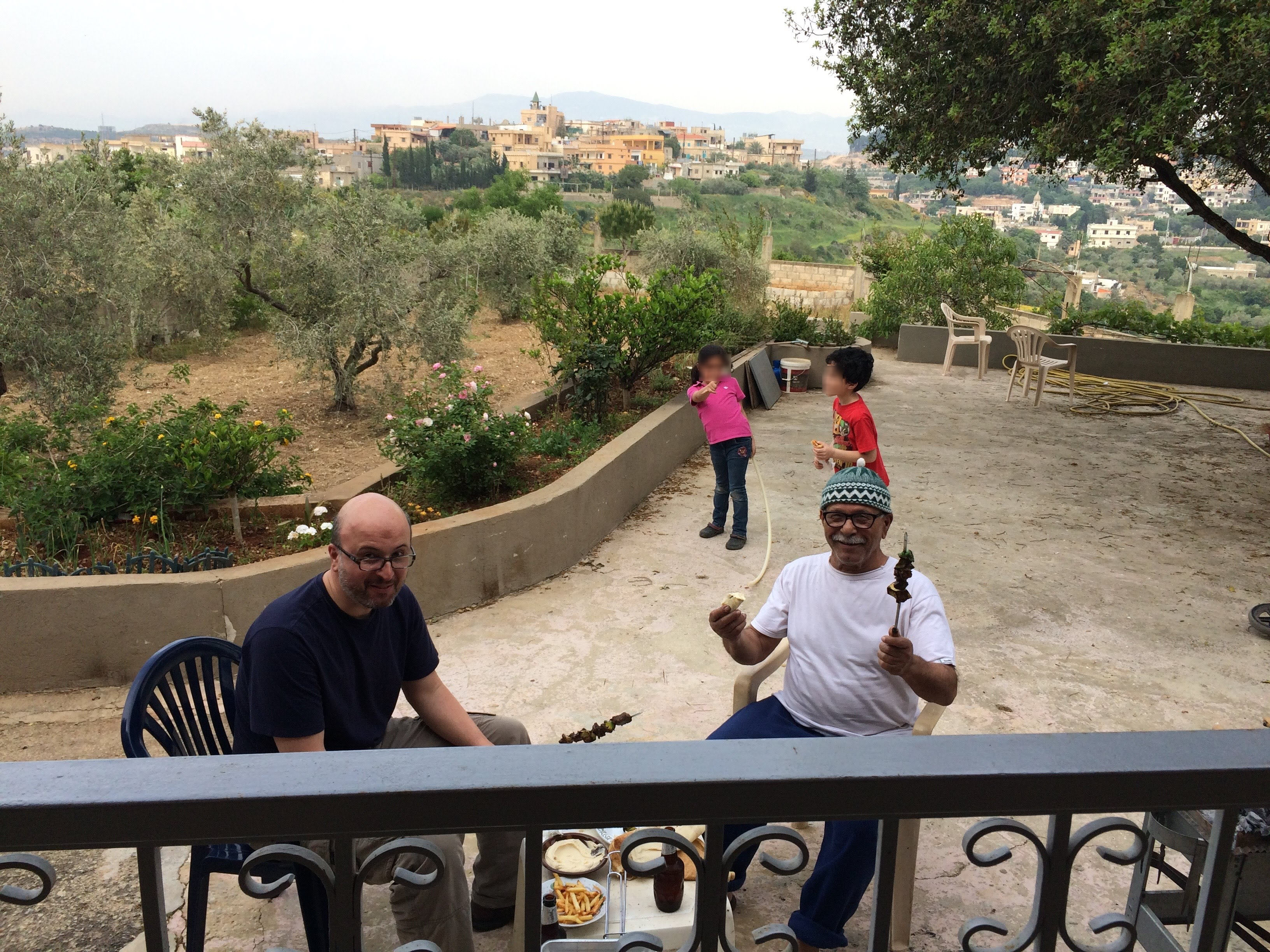
- Father and son in Al-Numairiyah

- Location in Lebanon
- Coordinates: 33°25′23″N 35°23′56″E
- Grid position: 118/165 L
- Country: Lebanon
- Governorate: Nabatieh Governorate
- District: Nabatieh District
- Time zone: UTC+2 (EET)
  - Summer (DST): +3

Al-Numairiyah (Arabic: النميرية, romanized: an-Numayriyah) is a municipality in the Nabatieh District in southern Lebanon.

== History ==
In the 1596 tax records, it was named as a village, Numayriyya, in the Ottoman nahiya (subdistrict) of Sagif under the liwa' (district) of Safad, with a population of 23 households and 6 bachelors, all Muslim. The villagers paid a fixed tax-rate of 25% on agricultural products, such as wheat, barley, olive trees, goats and beehives, in addition to "occasional revenues" and a press for olive oil or grape syrup; a total of 2,492 akçe.

=== Modern era ===
On July 29, 2006, during the 2006 Lebanon War, Israeli war planes killed 6 civilians, aged 8 to 56 years old, claiming that they were targeting Hezbollah. However, there was no Hezbollah presence in the village at the time of the attack.

== Demographics ==
In 2014, Muslims made up 99.40% of registered voters in Al-Numairiyah. 97.77% of the voters were Shiite Muslims.

== Bibliography ==
- HRW (2007). Why They Died: Civilian Casualties in Lebanon During the 2006 War. Human Rights Watch.
- Hütteroth, W.-D.; Abdulfattah, K. (1977). Historical Geography of Palestine, Transjordan and Southern Syria in the Late 16th Century. Erlanger Geographische Arbeiten, Sonderband 5. Erlangen, Germany: Vorstand der Fränkischen Geographischen Gesellschaft. ISBN 3-920405-41-2.
- Rhode, H. (1979). Administration and Population of the Sancak of Safed in the Sixteenth Century (PhD). Columbia University. Archived from the original on 2019-04-20.
