= 2025 Sidon airstrike =

Attack by Israeli forces in Lebanon

- Part of the Gaza war
- Location: 33°32′37″N 35°22′41″E; Ain al-Hilweh, Sidon, Lebanon
- Date: 18 November 2025
- Target: Hamas training compound (alleged)
- Attack type: Airstrike
- Deaths: 13+
- Injuries: 6+
- Perpetrator: Israeli Air Force

On November 18, 2025, an Israeli airstrike on the Ain al-Hilweh Palestinian refugee camp in Sidon District, Lebanon killed at least thirteen people, including eleven children and left six others injured. Israel said that it was targeting an alleged Hamas training centre, being used to plan an attack on Israel. Hamas denied the allegation.

== Background ==
Ain al-Hilweh, located on the outskirts of Sidon, is the largest Palestinian refugee camp in Lebanon. The camp was previously the site of an Israeli attack in October 2024, which purportedly targeted elements of the al-Aqsa Martyrs Brigade. A month later, the Lebanese government disarmed the camp as part of the Israel–Lebanon ceasefire agreement. Earlier on the day of the strike, Israel had launched airstrikes on another part of Lebanon, killing two people. Two prominent Hamas commanders were killed by the IDF in Lebanon earlier in 2025.

== Airstrike ==
Late on 18 November 2025, an Israeli drone launched an airstrike on a vehicle in the parking lot of the Khalid bin Al-Walid Mosque in Ain al-Hilweh. According to the state-run National News Agency, the initial strike was followed up by three other missile strikes which targeted the mosque and a nearby centre of the same name. At least 13 people were killed in the strike and several others were injured, as ambulances rushed to the scene to transport the victims to hospitals. On 25 November, Thameen al-Kheetan, the spokesperson for the United Nations High Commissioner for Human Rights, stated that the strike also killed eleven children.

The Israeli Defense Forces said that it had targeted a Hamas training compound during the strike in a statement shortly afterwards. It additionally stated that it used "precision munitions, aerial observations, and additional intelligence information" for the strike in order to limit civilian casualties. Hamas denied Israel's assertion. On 21 November, the IDF said that the 13 fatalities were Hamas members, and included Jawad Sidawi, who helped train militants to attack Israel from Lebanese territory.

== Aftermath ==
The Office of the United Nations High Commissioner for Human Rights has urged for a "prompt and impartial" investigation into the Israeli attack, alerting people to potential breaches of international humanitarian law almost a year after a ceasefire was agreed upon.

On 25 November, Israeli media reported that Hamas in Lebanon had strengthened its presence in Lebanon and prepared entire companies of Hamas fighters, ready to join Hezbollah's Radwan forces in southern Lebanon, if order is given, after Hezbollah suffered heavy blows in recent war. Hamas also, according to the report, started increasing it is missile production in Lebanon, especially in the citys of Tyre, Sidon and Tripoli after the recent war mainly focused on Hezbollah.

== See also ==
- Attacks on refugee camps in the Gaza war
- November 2025 Israeli attack in Beirut
