= 2025 Bint Jbeil drone strike =

Israeli attack in Lebanon

- Part of the 2024 Israeli invasion of Lebanon
- Map of the Nabatieh Governorate within Lebanon
- Location: Bint Jbeil, Nabatieh Governorate, Lebanon
- Date: 21 September 2025
- Attack type: Drone strike
- Deaths: 5
- Injuries: 2
- Perpetrator: Israel Defense Forces

The 2025 Bint Jbeil drone strike was an Israeli airstrike in Southern Lebanon on 21 September 2025 which killed 5 people, including 3 children, and injured at least 2 others. The Lebanese government stated that four of the attack victims were U.S. citizens. The U.S. government and the victims' surviving relatives disputed this claim.

== Background ==
Israel launched a major offensive against Hezbollah in September 2024, killing top commanders and targeted command centers and weapons storage facilities with the aim to have displaced people return to northern Israel. On 24 November 2024, Israel and Lebanon signed the 2024 Israel–Lebanon ceasefire agreement. Since the ceasefire went into effect, both Israel and Hezbollah have been accused of violating the agreement. Earlier in the conflict, in December 2023, an airstrike on another family home in Bint Jbiel killed three members of another family, including two Australian citizens.

== Attack ==
On the morning of 21 September 2025, the Lebanese state-run National News Agency reported that Israel fired two drone strikes in Bint Jbeil targeting a motorcycle and a vehicle. The strike killed five Lebanese citizens. Additionally, three children and their father killed in the attack were American citizens, according to Lebanon’s Speaker of Parliament Nabih Berri.

== Victims ==
The victims of the attack were five members of the same family, according to surviving relatives. Four of the victims were a father and three children from the Charara family traveling back home by car to Bint Jbeil from Tyre. Family members say that the fifth victim was the father's cousin, but he was on motorcycle during the strike passing by chance and not traveling with the other four victims. According to relatives, Charara did not have American citizenship, but his father and siblings are U.S. citizens. They said that Charara had recently received approval to join his immediate relatives but was waiting on visas.

== Reactions ==
=== Domestic ===
==== Lebanese government ====
Berri strongly condemned the attack, stating "the blood of these Lebanese children, their father, and their wounded mother, who hold American citizenship, is on the conscience of those gathered in Naqoura, and the global demonstration that has begun to gather at the United Nations headquarters."

Lebanese president Joseph Aoun, from New York City, stated that the Israeli military “committed a new massacre in Bint Jbeil."

=== Israel ===
According to the IDF, the target of the attack was a "Hezbollah operative." However, the military stated that the strike's civilian casualties were to be investigated. “The IDF regrets any harm to uninvolved [civilians], and works as much as possible to mitigate harm to them,” the IDF said, adding that “the incident is being investigated.”

=== United States ===
A state department spokesperson disputed the Lebanese government claim that the victims included American citizens. “While the situation is fluid, so far, indications are that the five killed were not US citizens,” they told CNN.

Representative Rashida Tlaib stated on X (formerly Twitter) that four of the victims had ties to a family in her district.
