= 2026 Israeli crossing of the Litani River =

Military raid during the 2026 Lebanon War

Israeli crossing of the Litani River
- Part of 2026 Lebanon War and 2026 Iran War
Date	c. 2 May 2026 — 12 May 2026 (c. 10 Days)
Location	Litani River and Zawtar al-Sharqiyah, Lebanon
Result	Israeli victory
Territorial changes	The Northern-Western bank of the Litani River falls under Israeli occupation; The outskirts of Zawtar al-Sharqiyah are occupied by the IDF

Belligerents
Israel	Hezbollah

Units involved
Israel Defense Forces; Israeli Ground Forces; Egoz Unit; Golani Brigade; 36th Golani Division; Golani Brigade’s Reconnaissance Unit "Sayeret Golani"; Oketz Unit; Israeli Air Force	Hezbollah military; Local garrison

On 12 May 2026, the Israeli Defense Forces publicly revealed the existence of a week-long raid that enabled Israeli forces to cross the Litani River; this allegedly resulted in the IDF destroying Hezbollah operational infrastructure and occupying the northwestern bank of the river alongside the outskirts of Zawtar al-Sharqiyah. The crossing occurred in the wider context of the 2026 Lebanon War and ended in an Israeli victory.

The raid was reported to have lasted approximately ten days.

== Background ==
=== Start of hostilities ===
At the start of the 2026 Iran war, U.S. and Israeli strikes killed Iran's Supreme Leader, Ali Khamenei. Following Iranian confirmation of Khamenei's death on 1 March, Hezbollah Secretary-General Naim Qassem vowed to retaliate and "undertake our duty of confronting the aggression", stating that Hezbollah would not leave "the field of honour and resistance".

On 2 March, Hezbollah launched several projectiles into northern Israel, its first such attack since the 2024 ceasefire, targeting a missile defence site near Haifa. The group described the attack as a "defensive act" aimed at forcing Israel to halt its operations in Lebanon and withdraw from occupied areas, stating it was unrelated to the Iran war.

The Israel Defense Forces (IDF) said one projectile was intercepted while others landed in open areas. In response, Israel carried out overnight airstrikes in Beirut and across southern Lebanon, killing hundreds of civilians and issuing evacuation orders for dozens of communities. The IDF claimed the strikes targeted senior Hezbollah figures and infrastructure; it later reported killing Hezbollah intelligence chief Hussain Makled, while early reports suggested other senior leaders may also have been targeted.

=== Iran war ceasefire and Lebanon war ceasefire ===
Pakistan mediated the 2026 Iran war ceasefire and said Lebanon was included in the ceasefire, temporarily halting the 2026 Iran war for two weeks. Shortly after, Israeli prime minister Benjamin Netanyahu denied that was the case alongside U.S. President Donald Trump. On the contrary Pakistan and Iran insisted that Lebanon was included in the ceasefire alongside other nations such as France and Egypt.

Israel soon after initiated Operation Eternal Darkness and struck various sites in Lebanon in what were defined as the largest attacks since the start of the entire war. What followed was "Operation Silver Plow", which was announced by Israel Katz and led to the occupation of various villages in Southern Lebanon and the Battle of Bint Jbeil.

Following the 2026 Israel–Lebanon ceasefire, Israeli demolitions and military operations still persisted, with both sides insisting that there was objectively no ceasefire. Additionally, following the ceasefire, Israel declared the creation of a "Yellow Line" in Southern Lebanon akin to that in Gaza. The Yellow Line also included Zawtar al-Sharqiyah and its surrounding areas, which were the main battleground for the crossing of the Litani river.

The IDF previously attempted to cross the river in at least one location in late March. That attempt, by Yahalom combat engineers and the 98th Paratroopers Division, failed when the units which were making preparations for the crossing were targeted by Hezbollah's rockets and mortars; as a result, at least one IDF soldier was killed and the IDF had to withdraw while abandoning their engineering equipment.

== Raid ==
Before troops reached the location of the raid, the Israeli Air Force directly targeted Hezbollah defenses in an attempt to "soften them" and make the crossing smoother. Advanced robots were also sent to scan the battlefield, where they located numerous Hezbollah militants who were attacked using robotic warfare.

On 4 May 2026 Hezbollah claimed that they engaged Israeli troops that had launched an assault from Deir Siryan toward Zawtar al-Sharqiyah. Days later, the head of local authorities told the media that it is not known whether the IDF withdrew or if it still remains in the area, but said that the images published by the IDF were apparently taken in the "Khallet Raj" area, a location two kilometers from the town where locals like to go to in order to stay in a local chalet by the river.

When the IDF physically arrived at the location, they encountered rough terrain, which was made even more hostile by the fact that the local Hezbollah militias knew the terrain better than they did. Despite this, the IDF reported successfully crossing the river with armored vehicles.

The Sayeret Golani Unit crossed the river and conducted a 48-hour operation against Hezbollah militants stationed in an underground facility adjacent to the riverbank. The unit operated in complete darkness, and the locations of the fortifications had been provided by Israeli intelligence. When the IDF located the underground facility, it encountered fierce Hezbollah resistance that lasted for two hours. The Hezbollah militants attempted to repel the unit by strategically emerging from different exits of the facility, firing at the soldiers, throwing grenades, and then retreating underground. After securing the area, the Sayeret Golani Unit carried out clearing operations for five days, allegedly discovering numerous food supplies, rifles, grenades, and even vehicles. Hezbollah also attempted to challenge the IDF's presence in the area through drone warfare; however, due to the fiber-optic technology employed, the drones proved ineffective in the local wadi, as they were frequently damaged by trees and dense vegetation.

The 36th Division of the Golani Brigade and the Egoz Unit were also reported to have crossed the Litani River and helped to secure the battlefield.

Israeli forces went beyond securing the riverbank and sought to establish control over the outskirts of the town of Zawtar al-Sharqiyah, where they encountered significant resistance. The IDF utilized previously Hezbollah-controlled tunnels to its advantage, adopting a strategy similar to Hezbollah's by launching assaults from underground facilities. Despite the loss of a military dog from the Oketz Unit and two lightly wounded soldiers from the Golani Brigade after exiting a tunnel, the IDF ultimately succeeded in securing control of the area.

== Aftermath ==
Following the end of the raid the IDF Spokesperson's Unit declared that Hezbollah fortifications and headquarters were fully destroyed, and Israeli media commented that, with this military achievement, the IDF had proven it could successfully cross the Litani River "if necessary". The area that was captured was north of Al-Qantara, captured one month prior to the operation. The area being secured will also allegedly allow Israel's "future crossings of armored and infantry forces" to target Hezbollah positions.
