= Nabatieh District =

Coordinates: 33°22′44″N 35°28′50″E

Nabatieh النبطية
- District
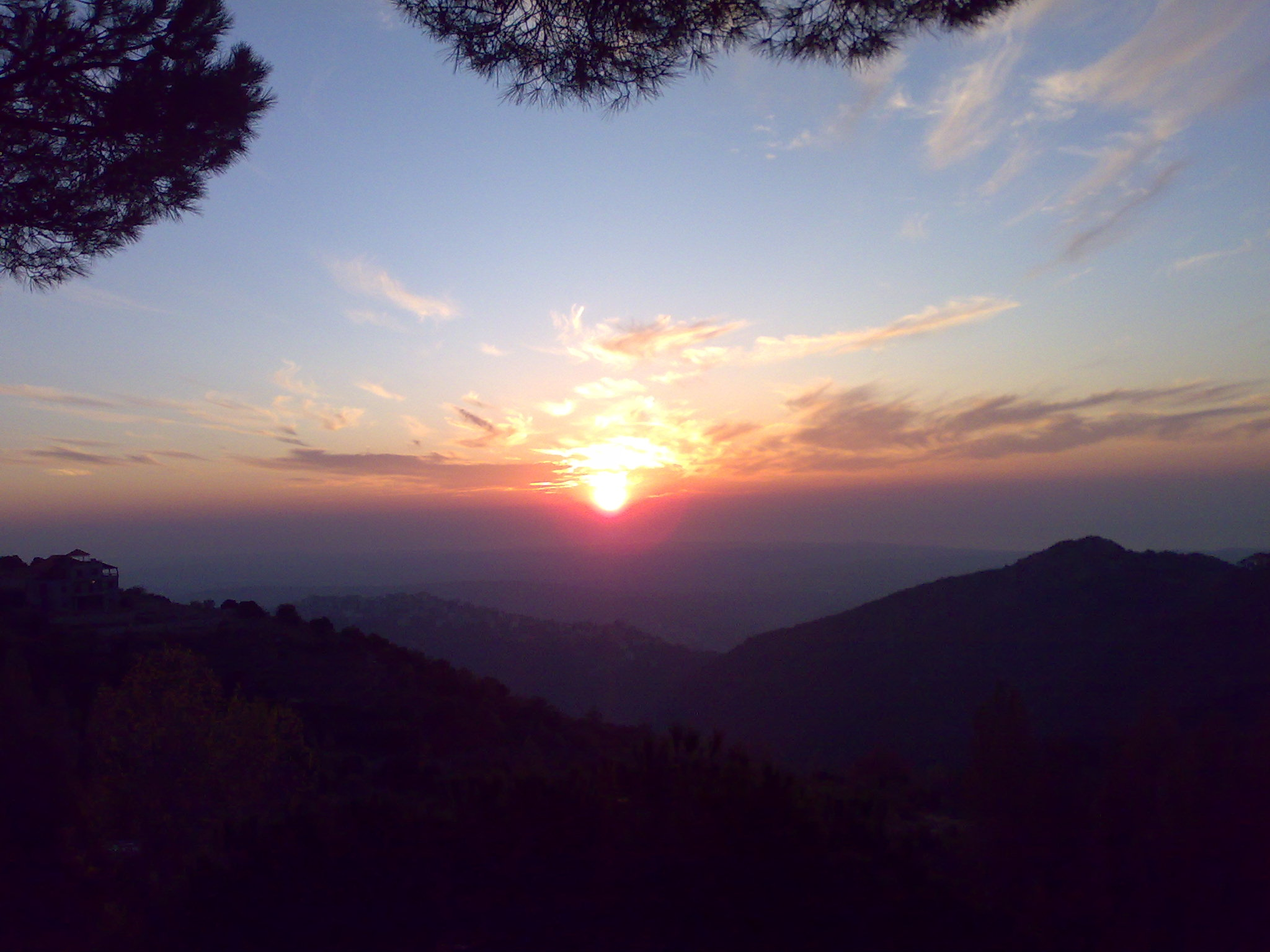
- Nabatieh District

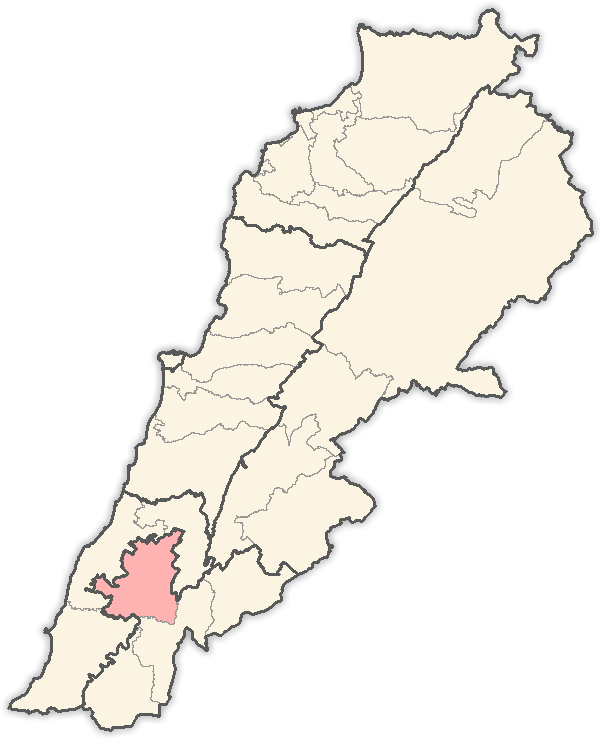
- Location in Lebanon
- Country: Lebanon
- Governorate: Nabatieh Governorate
- Capital: Nabatieh

Area
  - Total: 117 sq mi (304 km^{2})

Population
  - Estimate (31 December 2017): 155,233
- Time zone: UTC+2 (EET)
  - Summer (DST): UTC+3 (EEST)

The Nabatieh District (Arabic: قضاء النبطية) is a district in the Nabatieh Governorate of Lebanon. The capital of the district is Nabatieh.

== Municipalities ==
The following 42 municipalities are all located in the Nabatieh District:

- Aadshit
- Ain Bouswar
- Ain Qana
- Ansar
- Arabsalim
- Arnoun
- Aazze
- Braiqaa
- Deir ez-Zahrani
- Ad-Doueir
- Ebba
- Habboush
- Harouf
- Houmin al-Fawqa
- Houmin al-Tahta
- Jarjouaa
- Jbaa
- Jernaya
- Jibshit
- Kfar Fila
- Kfar Reman
- Kfar Sir
- Kfar Tebnit
- Kfaroue
- Al-Kfour
- Mayfadoun
- Nabatieh
- Nabatieh al-Fawqa
- Al-Numairiyah
- Qaaqaait al-Jisr
- Al-Qusaibah
- Roumin
- Sarba
- Al-Sharqiyah
- Shoukin
- Sini
- Sir al-Gharbiyah
- Toul
- Yohmor
- Zawtar al-Gharbiyah
- Zawtar al-Sharqiyah
- Zebdin
- Zefta

== Demographics ==
According to registered voters in 2014:

Year	Christians				Muslims				Druze
Year	Total	Maronites	Greek Catholics	Other Christians	Total	Shias	Sunnis	Alawites	Druze
2014	3.98%	2.89%	0.78%	0.31%	95.65%	93.50%	2.13%	0.02%	0.01%
2022	5.30%	3.42%	1.44%	0.44%	94.70%	92.22%	2.48%	0.00%	0.00%
