= Zefta, Lebanon =

Zefta زفتا
- Municipality
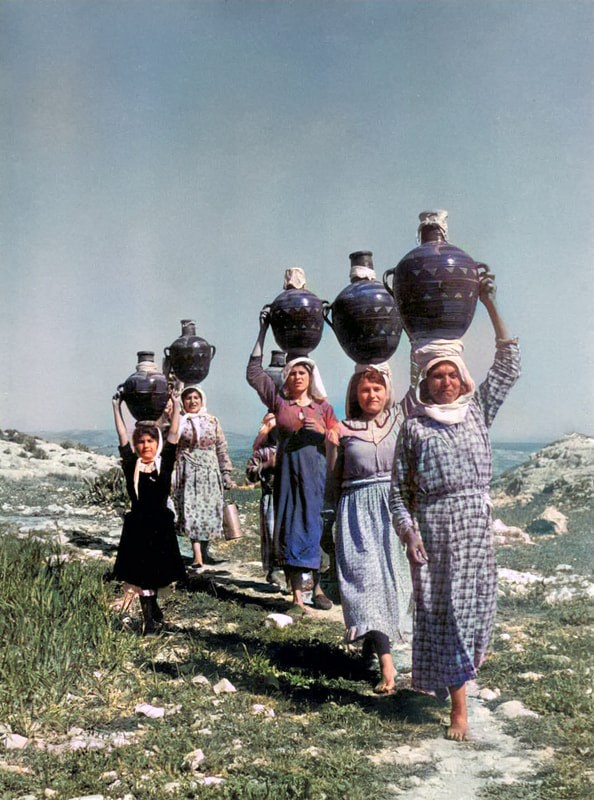
- Women of Zefta, 1960

- Location within Lebanon
- Coordinates: 33°26′54.0″N 35°23′53.5″E
- Grid position: 118/167 L
- Country: Lebanon
- Governorate: Nabatieh Governorate
- District: Nabatieh District
- Time zone: UTC+2 (EET)
  - Summer (DST): UTC+3 (EEST)
- Dialing code: +961

Zefta (Arabic: زفتا, romanized: Zaftā) is a municipality located in Nabatieh District, Southern Lebanon.

== History ==
In the 1596 tax records, it was named as a village in the Ottoman nahiya (subdistrict) of Sagif under the liwa' (district) of Safad, with a population of 17 households and 4 bachelors, all Muslim. The villagers paid a fixed tax-rate of 25 % on agricultural products, such as wheat, barley, fruit trees, goats and beehives, in addition to "occasional revenues" and a press for olive oil or grape syrup; a total of 1,740 akçe.

In 1875, Victor Guérin found here a village with 200 Metuali inhabitants.

== Demographics ==
In 2014 Muslims made up 99.62% of registered voters in Zefta. 97.26% of the voters were Shiite Muslims.

== Bibliography ==
- Hütteroth, W.-D.; Abdulfattah, K. (1977). Historical Geography of Palestine, Transjordan and Southern Syria in the Late 16th Century. Erlanger Geographische Arbeiten, Sonderband 5. Erlangen, Germany: Vorstand der Fränkischen Geographischen Gesellschaft. ISBN 3-920405-41-2.
- Guérin, V. (1880). Description Géographique Historique et Archéologique de la Palestine (in French). Vol. 3: Galilee, pt. 2. Paris: L'Imprimerie Nationale.
- Rhode, H. (1979). Administration and Population of the Sancak of Safed in the Sixteenth Century (PhD). Columbia University. Archived from the original on 2016-10-10.
