= Trihedral Neolithic =

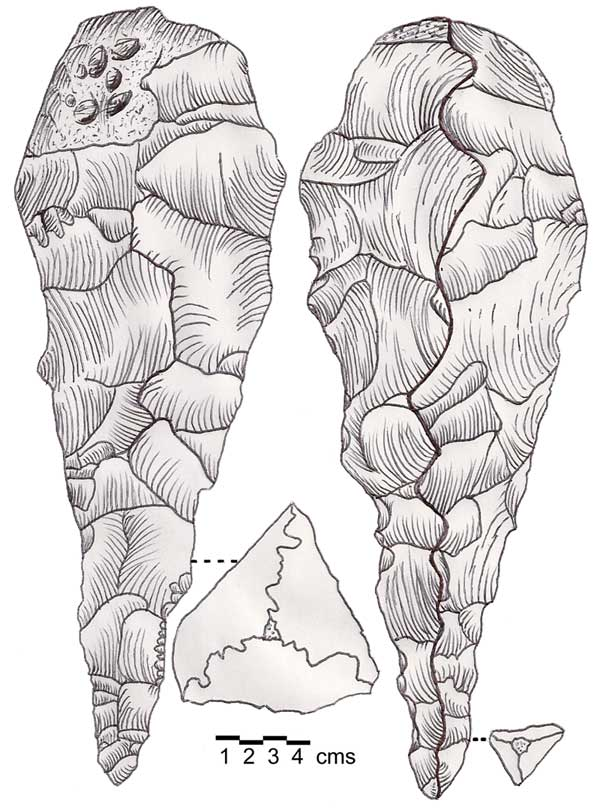
Trihedral Neolithic axe or pick from Joub Jannine II, Lebanon. brown. In the collection of the Museum of Lebanese Prehistory at the Saint Joseph University, Beirut, Lebanon.

Trihedral Neolithic is a name given by archaeologists to a style (or industry) of striking spheroid and trihedral (i.e., composed of three planes) flint tools from the archaeological site of Joub Jannine II in the Beqaa Valley, Lebanon. The style appears to represent a highly specialized Neolithic industry. Little comment has been made of this industry.
