= Zebdin =

Zebdin زبدين
- Municipality
- Location within Lebanon
- Coordinates: 33°22′37″N 35°27′40″E
- Country: Lebanon
- Governorate: Nabatieh Governorate
- District: Nabatieh District
- Time zone: UTC+2 (EET)
  - Summer (DST): UTC+3 (EEST)

Zebdin (Levantine Arabic: زبدين, romanized: Zebdīn) is a municipality in the Nabatieh District in Lebanon.

== History ==
In 1875, Victor Guérin noted on his travels in the region: "I arrived at Zebdin, a village situated on a hill whose slopes are cultivated with fig trees; it contains 600 Metualis. There is a small mosque fairly well built. At the bottom of the village is a fountain surmounted by an arched arcade of antique appearance. Two neighbouring wells must also date from antiquity."

== Demographics ==
In 2014 Muslims made up 99.51% of registered voters in Zebdin. 97.21% of the voters were Shiite Muslims.

== Bibliography ==
- Guérin, V. (1880). Description Géographique Historique et Archéologique de la Palestine (in French). Vol. 3: Galilee, pt. 2. Paris: L'Imprimerie Nationale.
