= Zawtar al-Gharbiyah =

Zawtar al-Gharbiyah زوطر الغربية
- Municipality
- Location within Lebanon
- Coordinates: 33°19′20″N 35°27′45″E
- Grid position: 125/154 L
- Country: Lebanon
- Governorate: Nabatieh Governorate
- District: Nabatieh District
- Time zone: UTC+2 (EET)
  - Summer (DST): UTC+3 (EEST)

Zawtar al-Gharbiyah (Arabic: زوطر الغربية, romanized: Zawṭar al-Gharbiyah, lit. 'Western Zawtar') is a municipality in the Nabatieh District in Lebanon, paired with Zawtar al-Sharqiyah (Eastern Zawtar).

== History ==
In the 1596 tax records, it was named as a village, Sarqiyya, in the Ottoman nahiya (subdistrict) of Sagif under the liwa' (district) of Safad, with a population of 24 households, all Muslim. The villagers paid a fixed tax-rate of 25% on agricultural products, such as wheat, barley, fruit trees, goats and beehives, in addition to "occasional revenues"; a total of 1,240 akçe.

== Demographics ==
In 2014, Muslims made up 99.47% of registered voters in Zawtar al-Gharbiyah. 98.78% of the voters were Shiite Muslims.

== Bibliography ==
- Hütteroth, W.-D.; Abdulfattah, K. (1977). Historical Geography of Palestine, Transjordan and Southern Syria in the Late 16th Century. Erlanger Geographische Arbeiten, Sonderband 5. Erlangen, Germany: Vorstand der Fränkischen Geographischen Gesellschaft. ISBN 3-920405-41-2.
- Rhode, H. (1979). Administration and Population of the Sancak of Safed in the Sixteenth Century. Columbia University. Archived from the original on 2020-03-01.
