= Al-Sharqiyah =

Al-Sharqiyah الشرقية
- Municipality
- Location within Lebanon
- Coordinates: 33°24′00″N 35°25′10″E
- Grid position: 120/163 L
- Country: Lebanon
- Governorate: Nabatieh Governorate
- District: Nabatieh District
- Established: 1649AD
- Founder: Cheaib
- Time zone: UTC+2 (EET)
  - Summer (DST): UTC+3 (EEST)
- Dialing code: +961

Al-Sharqiyah (Arabic: الشرقية, romanized: ash-Sharqiyah, also Sharqiyeh, Charkieh) is a municipality in the Nabatieh Governorate region of southern Lebanon, located just north of Doueir.

== History ==
Al-Sharqiyah was first settled by the family Cheaib whose members escaped systemic persecution in Eastern Lebanon back in 1574 AD by their enemies, the Houbaiches, Assafs and Saifas. Ranking members of the Cheaib's and their families fled to different parts of Lebanon, Syria, Turkey, Israel, and Egypt where they currently reside. Many are well known especially in Nabatieh Governorate (Arabic: محافظة النبطية), in South Lebanon. The Cheaib's trace their family roots to the ancient city of Arqa (Arabic: عرقة) in the North governorate. They also trace their ancestry to the Midianite Nabi (Prophet) Shuaib. In the Hebrew Bible, Jethro (biblical figure)(/ˈdʒɛθroʊ/; Hebrew: יִתְרוֹ, Standard: Yitro, Tiberian: Yiṯerô, meaning "His Excellence/Posterity"; Arabic: شعيب, romanized: Shuʿayb) was Moses' father-in-law, a Kenite shepherd and priest of Midian.

In 1875, Victor Guérin visited the place (which he called Charkieh), and described it: "I go up to Charkieh, passing by a oualy dedicated to Neby-Djelil. Near this sanctuary is an ancient reservoir, of the shape of a rectangle, made in the rock. Charkieh is a small village of 150 Metualis, situated on a hill and whose houses are roughly built. The reservoir of which I have spoken, a well, and a certain number of regular materials which were used in the construction of the oualy, and of the minaret which surmounts it, announce that this locality succeeded an ancient village."

== Demographics ==
In 2014, Muslims made up 99.31% of registered voters in Al-Sharqiyah. 98.23% of the voters were Shiite Muslims.

== Bibliography ==
- Guérin, V. (1880). Description Géographique Historique et Archéologique de la Palestine (in French). Vol. 3: Galilee, pt. 2. Paris: L'Imprimerie Nationale.
