= Jarjouaa =

Jarjouaa جرجوع
- Municipality
- Location in Lebanon
- Coordinates: 33.4458°N 35.5191°E
- Country: Lebanon
- Governorate: Nabatieh Governorate
- District: Nabatieh District
- Time zone: UTC+2 (EET)
  - Summer (DST): +3

Jarjouaa (Arabic: جرجوع) is a municipality in Lebanon, located in the Nabatieh District, Nabatieh Governorate. It is between the villages of Houmin Al Fawqa, Arabsalim, Jbaa, Ain Bouswar, Alwayizeh, Soujod, Ain Qana. The village sits on the shoulder of Mleeta hills, with Oak forests on the surrounding mountains. Al Zahrani River spring starts in Jarjouaa known as Al Taseh spring. The demography of Jarjouh is approximately evenly divided between Christians and Muslims.

== History ==
Some scholars attribute the origin of this town's name to the Hebrew word meaning “the shaved, the hairless or the bald.” Others trace it back to a combination of two root words meaning “drinking and shortage.”

On 8 July 1990 Jarjouaa and four other locations were attached by the Israeli airforce. It was the twelfth Israeli air attack on Lebanon since the beginning of the year. Five people were reported killed.

A week later, 16 July, Jarjouaa was captured from Amal by Hizbullah. It was the culmination of two weeks of fighting in which around two hundred people were killed.

On 4 May 1995 a villager was killed by Israeli shellfire.

== Demographics ==
In 2014 Muslims made up 75.29% and Christians made up 24.15% of registered voters in Jarjouaa. 73.25% of the voters were Shiite Muslims, 13.23% were Greek Catholics and 9.96% were Maronite Catholics.
