= Ansar, Lebanon =

Ansar أنصار Insar
- Municipality
- Location in Lebanon
- Coordinates: 33°23′N 35°21′E
- Country: Lebanon
- Governorate: Nabatieh Governorate
- District: Nabatieh District
- Time zone: UTC+2 (EET)
  - Summer (DST): +3

Ansar (Arabic: أنصار; also spelled Insar) is a municipality in the Nabatieh Governorate region of southern Lebanon located between Nabatieh and Tyre, Lebanon, next to the village of Doueir. It has a population of 31,970.

== History ==
=== Ottoman era ===
In 1875, Victor Guérin passed by the village (which he called Naser) on his travels in the region, describing it located "on a hill" and being "quite considerable, and its population consists of Metualis and "Greeks united".

=== Modern era ===
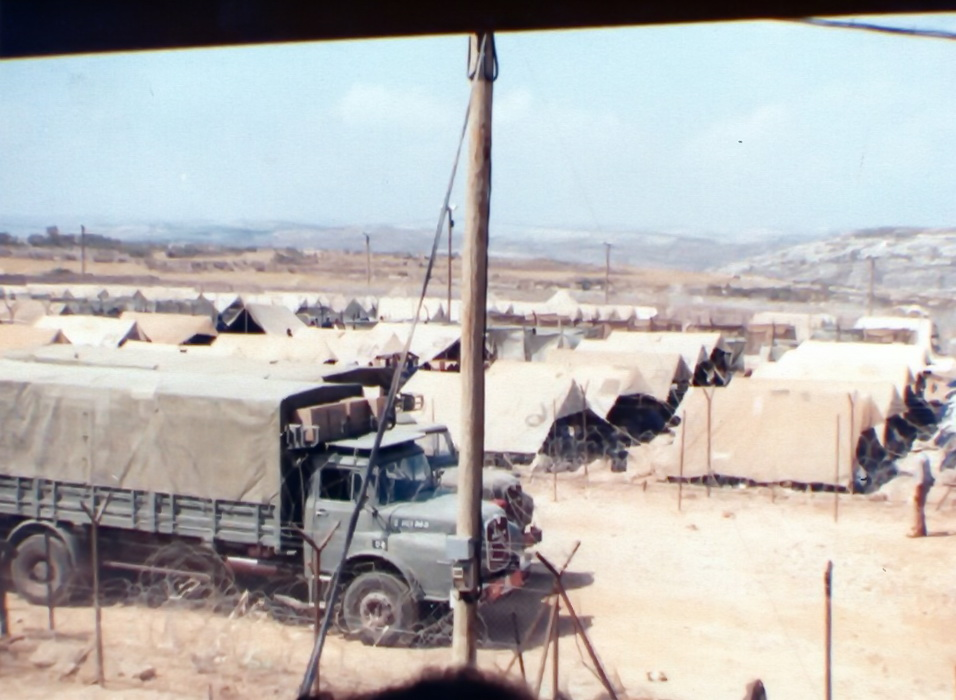
Ansar detention camp

After the 1982 Israeli invasion of Lebanon, the IDF built a prison camp outside Ansar. The prisoners lived in tents with the camp divided into sections, each containing fifty 3x3 metre tents and surrounded by 4 metre high barbed wire fences. At its peak the camp held 9,000 prisoners. Six months after the camp was opened the commanding officer was replaced following reports of routine beatings, food and water being withheld, prisoners blindfolded for long periods and insufficient sanitation. In February 1983, during a mass hunger strike, several prisoners were shot dead. On the first anniversary of the invasion there were demonstrations during which guards were afraid to enter the compounds. On 8 August 1983, several prisoners escaped in a tunnel that had taken 45 days to dig. In October three prisoners were buried alive after the guards discovered their tunnel. The following month 4,500 prisoners from Ansar were released in exchange for six Israeli soldiers held by the PLO. Previously 200 prisoners had been transferred to Israel. They were not included in the exchange. 1,100 of those released were bussed into Israel and then flown to Algeria. The Israeli prisoners were taken in a small boat to a French warship off Tripoli. A new camp was subsequently built close by with huts instead of tents. By January 1984 it held 200 prisoners. In 1985 one source estimated that the camp held 15,000 prisoners, mainly Lebanese Shiites. An Israel Army reservist who had served at Ansar was quoted in the newspaper Maariv as saying that the old camp had been sitting on top of a tunnel system. In 1988 when the Israeli army opened a prison camp in the Negev close to the Egyptian border, Ktzi'ot Prison, to hold prisoners detained during the First Intifada, it became known as Ansar III. It is still being used.

During the 2006 Lebanon War, the village was bombed by Israeli forces and five civilians were killed.

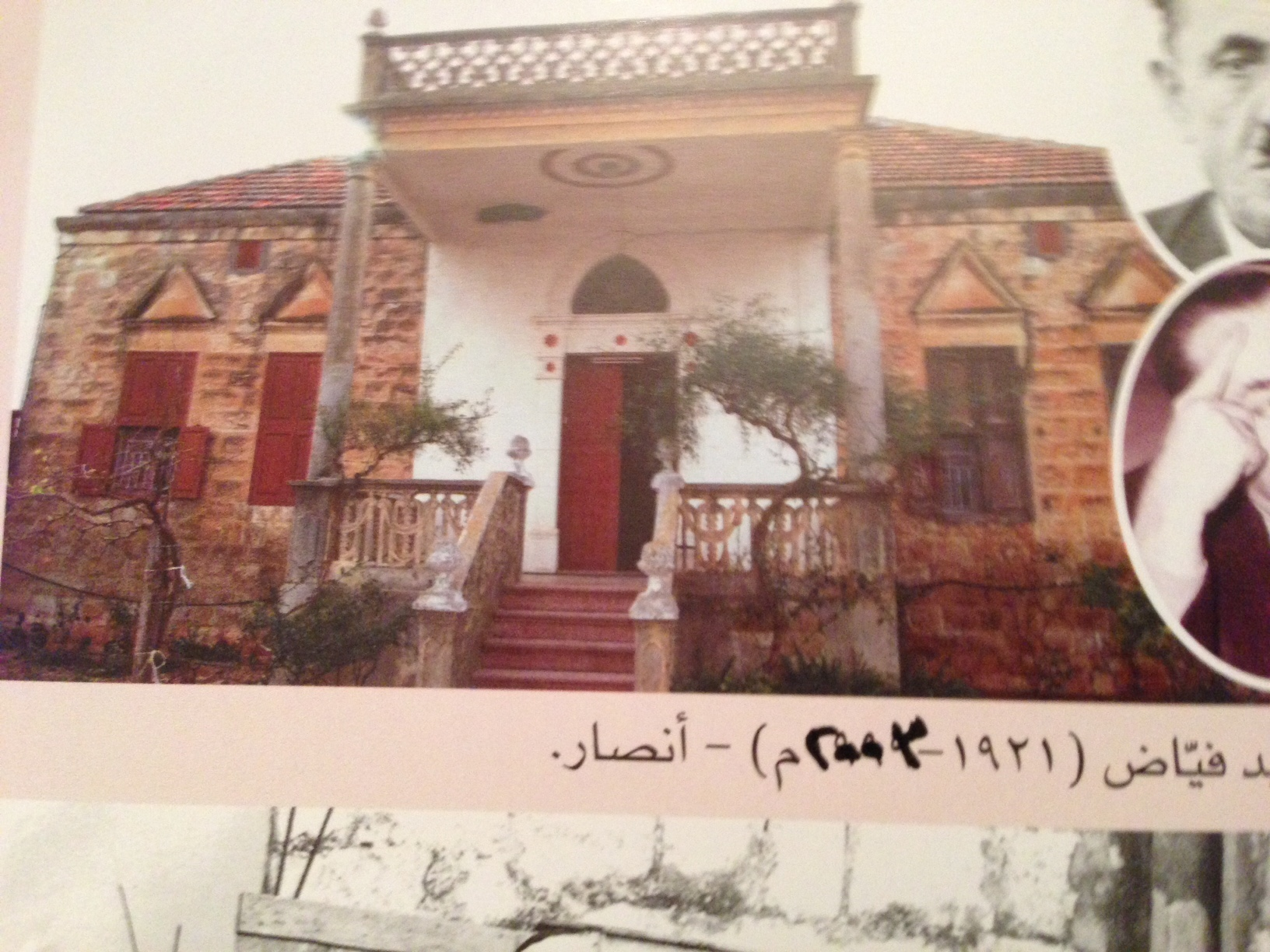
Home of Said Fayad in Ansar

Ansar is the hometown of the poet and journalist Said Fayad (1921 - 2003).

== Demographics ==
In 2014 Muslims made up 98.81% of registered voters in Ansar. 96.91% of the voters were Shiite Muslims.

== Bibliography ==
- Guérin, V. (1880). Description Géographique Historique et Archéologique de la Palestine (in French). Vol. 3: Galilee, pt. 2. Paris: L'Imprimerie Nationale.
- HRW (2007). Why They Died: Civilian Casualties in Lebanon During the 2006 War. Human Rights Watch.
