= Eva Kanso =

American mechanical engineer

- Education: American University of Beirut; University of California, Berkeley
- Known for: Mechanical Engineering
- Scientific career
- Workplaces: University of Southern California

Eva Kanso is a Lebanese-American mechanical engineer who investigates the locomotion of animals through fluids and the replication of similar behavior by robots and in computer animation. She is a professor and Zohrab A. Kaprielian Fellow in the Department of Aerospace and Mechanical Engineering at the University of Southern California, and a program director at the National Science Foundation.

== Education and career ==
Kanso earned a bachelor's degree in mechanical engineering in 1997 from the American University of Beirut. She attended the University of California, Berkeley for graduate school, earning a master's degree in mechanical engineering in 1999, a second master's degree in mathematics in 2002, and a Ph.D. in mechanical engineering in 2003. She wrote her doctoral dissertation, Impact of a Pseudo-Ball on a Rigid Foundation about research that was jointly mentored by Panayiotis Papadopoulos and Andrew J. Szeri.

After postdoctoral and visiting positions at the University of California, Berkeley, Princeton University, and California Institute of Technology, she joined the University of Southern California as an assistant professor in the Department of Aerospace and Mechanical Engineering in 2005. In her scientific research, Kanso has investigated the behavior of fish, the ways that cilia can move liquid and move small organisms through liquid, the ways that the motion of water can be used to sense moving objects, and how sea stars can coordinate the motion of their feet without a central brain.

== Recognition ==
Kanso was honored with the Distinguished Young Alumnus Award from the American University of Beirut in 2014.

The University of Southern California recognized Kanso with a 2016 mentoring award for Faculty Mentoring Graduate Students.

She was named a Fellow of the American Physical Society (APS) in 2022, after a nomination from the APS Division of Fluid Dynamics, "for penetrating and insightful investigations of problems in biological aquatic and aerial locomotion, ciliary transport, swarms and schooling, and many other topics, that deftly blend elegant theoretical models and physical experiments".
