= Jebchit =

Jibchit جبشيت
- Municipality
- Location in Lebanon
- Coordinates: 33°21′50″N 35°25′48″E
- Grid position: 121/159 L
- Country: Lebanon
- Governorate: Nabatieh Governorate
- District: Nabatieh District

Area
  - Total: 2.54 sq mi (6.58 km^{2})
- Elevation: 1,250 ft (380 m)
- Time zone: UTC+2 (EET)
  - Summer (DST): +3

Jibchit (Arabic: جبشيت, romanized: Jibshīt; also Romanized Jibshit, Jibsheet, etc.) is a municipality in the Nabatieh Governorate region of southern Lebanon located north of the Litani River.

== History ==
In 1596, named Jibsid, it was a village in the Ottoman nahiya (subdistrict) of Sagif under the liwa' (district) of Safad, with a population of 39 households and 10 bachelors, all Muslim. The villagers paid a fixed tax-rate of 25% on agricultural products, such as wheat, barley, olive trees, fruit trees, goats, beehives and "occasional revenues"; a total of 5,040 akçe.

In 1875 Victor Guérin found here a village of 400 Metualis, and a Wali, named Nabi Seth.

On the night of 27/28 July 1989, Israeli occupation commandos abducted the Hezbollah leader Sheikh Abdel Karim Obeid and two of his aides from his home in Jibchit. The operation was planned by the then Minister of Defence Yitzhak Rabin. Hezbollah responded by announcing the execution of Colonel Higgins, a senior American officer working with UNIFIL who had been kidnapped in February 1988.

In 1993, during a week-long attack by Israel on Lebanon, an Israeli Army spokesperson said that "70 percent of the village of Jibchit is totally destroyed, its inhabitants will not recognize it." The goal was "to wipe the villages from the face of the earth," a senior officer added.

== Demographics ==
In 2014, around 14,000 people voted, of which Muslims made up 99.76% of registered voters in Jibchit. 99.05% of the voters were Shiite Muslims.

== See also ==
- Abdel Karim Obeid
- Ragheb Harb
- El Zein family

== Bibliography ==
- Guérin, V. (1880). Description Géographique Historique et Archéologique de la Palestine (in French). Vol. 3: Galilee, pt. 2. Paris: L'Imprimerie Nationale.
- Hütteroth, W.-D.; Abdulfattah, K. (1977). Historical Geography of Palestine, Transjordan and Southern Syria in the Late 16th Century. Erlanger Geographische Arbeiten, Sonderband 5. Erlangen, Germany: Vorstand der Fränkischen Geographischen Gesellschaft. ISBN 3-920405-41-2.
- Rhode, H. (1979). Administration and Population of the Sancak of Safed in the Sixteenth Century (PhD). Columbia University. Archived from the original on 2016-10-10.
