= Al-Qusaibah =

Al-Qusaibah القصيبة El Kossaybeh El Qsaïbé
- Municipality
- Location in Lebanon
- Coordinates: 33°20′01″N 35°23′48″E
- Grid position: 118/155 L
- Country: Lebanon
- Governorate: Nabatieh Governorate
- District: Nabatieh District

Government
  - Mayor: Hassan Rachid Mehdi
  - Mayor: Najib Wehbe
- Elevation: 1,300 ft (400 m)

Population (2011)
  - Total: 8,400
- Time zone: UTC+2 (EET)
  - Summer (DST): +3
- postal code: 71374
- Area code: +961 - (07 - South Lebanon)

Al-Qusaibah (Arabic: القصيبة, romanized: al-Quṣaybah), sometimes El Kossaybeh or El Qsaïbé, is municipality in Nabatieh Governorate on the northern side of the Litani River.

== History ==
In the 1596 tax records, it was named as a village, Qusayba, in the Ottoman nahiya (subdistrict) of Sagif, part of Safad Sanjak, with a population of 26 households and 7 bachelors, all Muslim. The villagers paid a fixed tax-rate of 25% on agricultural products, such as wheat, barley, olive trees, cotton, goats and beehives, in addition to "occasional revenues"; a total of 4,300 akçe.

In 1875, Victor Guérin found here a village with 300 inhabitants, mostly Metualis and some Greek Orthodox. The mosque was possibly a former church.

== Demographics ==
In 2014 Muslims made up 99.62% of registered voters in Al-Qusaibah. 99.49% of the voters were Shiite Muslims.

== Bibliography ==
- Hütteroth, W.-D.; Abdulfattah, K. (1977). Historical Geography of Palestine, Transjordan and Southern Syria in the Late 16th Century. Erlanger Geographische Arbeiten, Sonderband 5. Erlangen, Germany: Vorstand der Fränkischen Geographischen Gesellschaft. ISBN 3-920405-41-2.
- Guérin, V. (1880). Description Géographique Historique et Archéologique de la Palestine (in French). Vol. 3: Galilee, pt. 2. Paris: L'Imprimerie Nationale.
- Rhode, H. (1979). Administration and Population of the Sancak of Safed in the Sixteenth Century. Columbia University. Archived from the original on 2016-10-10.
