= Ali Qanso =

Lebanese politician (1948–2018)

Ali Khalil Qanso
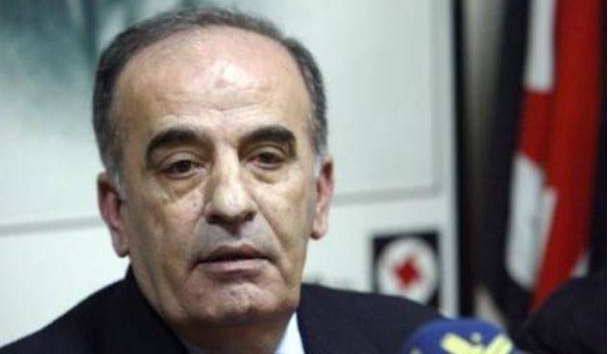

President of the Syrian Social Nationalist Party
- In office 5 August 2016 – 4 July 2018
- Preceded by: Assaad Hardan
- In office 5 August 2005 – 2008
- Succeeded by: Assaad Hardan

Minister of State for parliamentary affairs
- In office 18 December 2016 – 4 July 2018
- Prime Minister: Saad Hariri
- Preceded by: Muhammad Fneish

Personal details
- Born: 1948 Doueir, Lebanon
- Died: July 4, 2018 (aged 69–70) Beirut, Lebanon
- Party: Syrian Social Nationalist Party

Ali Khalil Qanso (Arabic: علي قانصوه; 1948 – 4 July 2018) was a Lebanese politician who served as a minister for parliamentary affairs in the second cabinet of Saad Hariri. He was the president of the Syrian Social Nationalist Party and he served as minister of state in Najib Mikati government and previously minister of labor in the cabinet of Rafik Hariri.

== Early life and education ==
Qanso was born into a Shiite family in 1948 in Doueir, Lebanon. He received bachelor of arts and master of arts degrees in Arabic literature from Lebanese University.

== Political career ==
Qanso was Minister for Labour of Lebanon in the government of Rafiq Hariri from 2000 to 2003. He was for the 3rd time head of the Syrian Social Nationalist Party from 5 August 2005 to July 2008. He again entered into government in July 2008 as Minister of State under Fouad Siniora with the backing of Hezbollah as part of the March 8 Alliance.

On 5 August 2016, he was elected again as the head of SSNP.

Flag of the Syrian Social Nationalist Party

== See also ==
- the region of Syria
- Syrian presence in Lebanon
- Politics of Lebanon

Preceded by Michel Moussa; 1998–2000	Lebanon; Ali Qanso, Minister of Labor, Lebanon; 2000–2003	Succeeded by Assaad Hardan; 2003–2004
