= Aadshit al-Shqeif =

Aadshit al-Shqeif عدشيت الشقيف
- Municipality
- Location in Lebanon
- Coordinates: 33°20′44.88″N 35°25′18.12″E
- Grid position: 120/157 L
- Country: Lebanon
- Governorate: Nabatieh Governorate
- District: Nabatieh District
- Time zone: UTC+2 (EET)
  - Summer (DST): +3

Aadshit al-Shqeif (Levantine Arabic: عدشيت الشقيف, romanized: ʿAdshīt ash-Shqeyf), or simply Aadshit (Arabic: عدشيت, romanized: ʿAdshīt), is a municipality in the Nabatieh Governorate region of southern Lebanon located north of the Litani River.

== History ==
In 1875, Victor Guérin found it to be a village of 350 Metualis. The villagers had a mosque.

== Demographics ==
In 2014 Muslims made up 99.67% of registered voters in Aadshit al-Shqeif. 98.06% of the voters were Shiite Muslims.

== Notable people ==
- Wissam Saleh (born 1993), former footballer

== Bibliography ==
- Guérin, V. (1880). Description Géographique Historique et Archéologique de la Palestine (in French). Vol. 3: Galilee, pt. 2. Paris: L'Imprimerie Nationale.
