= Kfar Tebnit =

Human settlement in Lebanon

Kfar Tebnit كفرتبنيت
- Municipality
- Location within Lebanon
- Country: Lebanon
- Governorate: South Governorate
- District: Tyre
- Time zone: GMT +3

Kfar Tebnit
- كفرتبنيت (Arabic)
- Kfar Tebnit
- Location within Lebanon
- 33°21′11″N 35°30′48″E
- Periods: Heavy Neolithic, Trihedral Neolithic, Neolithic
- Cultures: Qaraoun culture
- Location: 4 kilometres (2.5 mi) south southeast of Nabatieh, 37 kilometres (23 mi) southeast of Sidon, Lebanon
- Grid position: 128/157 L

Site notes
- Excavation dates: 1926
- Archaeologists: E. Passemard
- Public access: Unknown

Kfar Tebnit or Kfartebnit (Levantine Arabic: كفرتبنيت, romanized: Kfartebnīt) is a municipality located approximately 4 kilometres (2.5 mi) south southeast of Nabatieh, 37 kilometres (23 mi) southeast of Sidon in Lebanon.

== Etymology ==
Philip K. Hitti speculated that Kfar Tebnit takes its name from Tabnit, a Phoenician ruler in the area ca. 280 BC known as the "king of two Sidons". The sarcophagus of his son Eshmun-'azar was found to bear a long inscription aimed to prevent looting with assurances that the tomb contained no treasure. Hitti compared the name to that of the biblical figure Tibni. It may be noted, however, that several sites around Lebanon and Israel have similar names, including Tibnin, Khirbet et-Tibbaneh and Khirbet Tibnah.

== Archaeology ==
A Heavy Neolithic archaeological site of the Qaraoun culture was discovered here in 1926 by E. Passemard. Heavy Neolithic materials were found alongside one Trihedral Neolithic along with more regular Neolithic pieces. The tools were in sharp condition, made of fresh chert or grey-green flint and are stored in the National Museum of Beirut.

== History ==
In 1875, during the Ottoman era, Victor Guérin visited, and found here 130 Metualis.

=== Modern era ===
The Ottoman mosque of the village was totally destroyed as a result of the Israeli attacks in October 2024 in southern Lebanon.

In April 2026, a municipal member was killed by an Israeli drone strike during the 2026 Lebanon war.

On June 13, 2026, the Israel Defense Forces attempted to take over the city with numerous sources indicating that the city has been taken over by Israel or Israel has gained ground in the city.

On 19 June 2026, the IDF reported that four soldiers of the 401st Brigade, including a Lieutenant-Colonel, were killed after Hezbollah targeted their tank in the village.

== Demographics ==
In 2014 Muslims made up 99.86% of registered voters in Kfar Tebnit. 98.02% of the voters were Shiite Muslims.

== Bibliography ==
- Copeland, L.; P. Wescombe (1966). Inventory of Stone-Age Sites in Lebanon: North, South and East-Central Lebanon, pp. 35-36. Impr. Catholique.
- Guérin, V. (1880). Description Géographique Historique et Archéologique de la Palestine (in French). Vol. 3: Galilee, pt. 2. Paris: L'Imprimerie Nationale.
- Hitti, P.K. (30 January 2004). History of Syria, Including Lebanon and Palestine. Gorgias Press LLC. pp. 125–. ISBN 978-1-59333-119-1.
