= Ad-Doueir =

Ad-Doueir الدوير
- Municipality
- Location within Lebanon
- Coordinates: 33°23′11″N 35°24′52″E
- Grid position: 120/161 L
- Country: Lebanon
- Governorate: Nabatieh Governorate
- District: Nabatieh District

Government
  - Mayor: Mohammad Kanso

Area
  - Total: 10 km^{2} (3.9 sq mi)
- Elevation: 420 m (1,380 ft)
- Time zone: UTC+2 (EET)
  - Summer (DST): UTC+3 (EESTEEST)
- Dialing code: +961

Ad-Doueir (Arabic: الدوير, ad-Duwayr), or Dweir, is a municipality of 7,500 inhabitants in Southern Lebanon near Nabatieh, and north of the Litani River. It is located directly next to the village of Ash-Sharqiyah. Although Ad-Doueir is considered a big village, it is the home of many well-known Lebanese such as former Labour minister Ali Qanso, and the late physics scientist Rammal Rammal.

== History ==
In 1875 Victor Guérin found it to be a large village with 800 Metuali inhabitants.

During the 2006 Lebanon War, Ad-Doueir was among the first targets of the Israel Defense Forces, with a family of 12 killed on July 13. The village has since benefited from investment by the Italian government to build a new olive oil mill.

== Demographics ==
In 2014 Muslims made up 99.35% of registered voters in Ad-Doueir. 98.43% of the voters were Shiite Muslims.

== Bibliography ==
- Guérin, V. (1880). Description Géographique Historique et Archéologique de la Palestine (in French). Vol. 3: Galilee, pt. 2. Paris: L'Imprimerie Nationale.
