= Toul, Lebanon =

Toul تول
- Municipality
- Location within Lebanon
- Coordinates: 33°23′11″N 35°27′01″E
- Country: Lebanon
- Governorate: Nabatieh Governorate
- District: Nabatieh District
- Time zone: UTC+2 (EET)
  - Summer (DST): UTC+3 (EEST)

Toul (Arabic: تول, romanized: Tūl) is a municipality in the Nabatieh District in Lebanon.

== History ==
In 1875, Victor Guérin noted on his travels in the region: "on my right, to the north, on a hill from which a valley separates me, the little village of Toul. An oualy is dedicated to Neby Toul."

== Demographics ==
In 2014, Muslims made up 50% and Christians made up 50% of registered voters in Toul. 46.43% of the voters were Shiite Muslims and 46.43% were Maronite Catholics.

== Bibliography ==
- Guérin, V. (1880). Description Géographique Historique et Archéologique de la Palestine (in French). Vol. 3: Galilee, pt. 2. Paris: L'Imprimerie Nationale.
