= Zawtar al-Sharqiyah =

Zawtar al-Sharqiyah زوطر الشرقية
- Municipality
- Location within Lebanon
- Coordinates: 33°19′33″N 35°28′34″E
- Grid position: 127/154 L
- Country: Lebanon
- Governorate: Nabatieh Governorate
- District: Nabatieh District
- Time zone: UTC+2 (EET)
  - Summer (DST): UTC+3 (EEST)
- Dialing code: +961

Zawtar al-Sharqiyah (Arabic: زوطر الشرقية, romanized: Zawṭar ash-Sharqiyah, lit. 'Eastern Zawtar') is a municipality overlooking the Litani River in the province of Nabatieh in South Lebanon (85 km from Beirut; 9 km from Nabatieh; 475 m (1558ft) above sea level), together with Zawtar al-Gharbiyah as part of the Zawtar area.

Its population exceeds 4,000, most of whom depend on tobacco farming as their main or supplementary source of income. The town has one intermediate public school, one nursery, and one partially functioning health center affiliated with the Ministry of Social Affairs.

== Etymology ==
In Aramaic, Zawtar means the small or the event. In the Syriac language, it is what used to be offered to worshipped idols from flour, butter, and honey, back in antiquity.

Popular folk tales attribute the word to the abundance of grapes, as during its past times, the town was known as a wine village, where the alcoholic beverage was known as Zawtari wine. Camel caravans used to come from the Arabian Peninsula in the pre-Islamic times and load up on local grapes and wines. In another likely origin of the name, it is relative to the Phoenician princess called Zouzasit, who lived in the town during the Phoenician period.

== Historic structures ==
The ruins in Zawtar al-Sharqiyah are a continuation and extension of those in the neighboring town, Zawtar al-Gharbiyah. On the southern slopes, there are some natural caves.

A mosque stands in the town and dates back to 1850 CE.

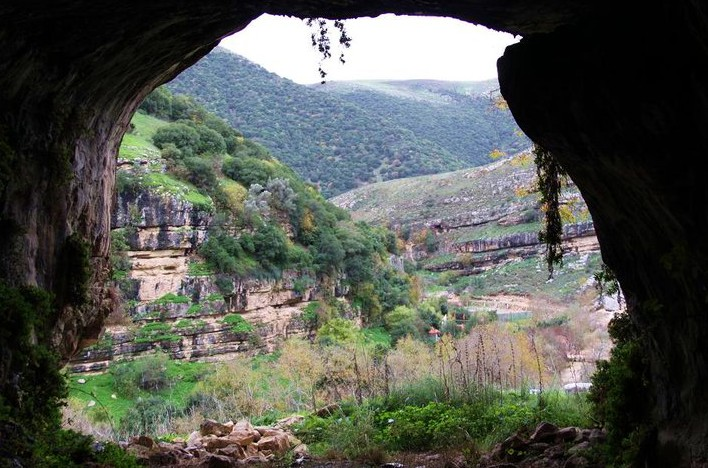

== Modern era ==
In 1995, Israel assassinated a local man, Rida Yassin, better known as Abu-Ali Rida, in the village.

On 31 March 2025, Lebanese Army and UNIFIL forces entered a major Hezbollah weapons and storage camp in Zawtar al-Sharqiyah, near the Litani River, which was described as one of Hezbollah's largest and most strategic facilities in southern Lebanon. The move followed renewed tensions and Israeli threats to resume military operations, amid accusations of recent rocket fire toward Kiryat Shmona. Joint forces reportedly searched Hezbollah vehicles and found an empty missile launcher. It remained unclear whether Hezbollah had consented to the operation. The action was part of efforts to enforce UN Resolution 1701, which calls for disarming armed groups south of the Litani and reinforcing the authority of the Lebanese Armed Forces in the region.

In May 2026, during the 2026 Lebanon war, Hezbollah said its fighters clashed with the IDF forces in the town.

== Demographics ==
In 2014 Muslims made up 99.29% of registered voters in Zawtar al-Sharqiyah. 98.73% of the voters were Shiite Muslims.
