= Timeline of the Gaza war (3 October 2025 – present) =

- Initial attacks; (7–27 October 2023); Invasion of the Gaza Strip; (28 October 2023 – 23 November 2023); First ceasefire; (24 November 2023 – 11 January 2024); Yemen airstrikes; (12 January 2024 – 6 May 2024); Rafah offensive; (7 May 2024 – 12 July 2024); Al-Mawasi attack; (13 July 2024 – 26 September 2024); Attack on Hezbollah headquarters; (27 September 2024 – 16 October 2024); Killing of Yahya Sinwar; (17 October 2024 – 26 November 2024); Israel–Lebanon ceasefire agreement; (27 November 2024 – 18 January 2025); Israel–Hamas ceasefire agreement; (19 January 2025 – 17 March 2025); March 2025 Israeli attacks on the Gaza Strip; (18 March 2025 – 15 May 2025); May 2025 Gaza offensive; (16 May 2025 – 19 August 2025); August 2025 Gaza offensive; (20 August 2025 – 2 October 2025); October 2025 Israel–Hamas ceasefire agreement; (3 October 2025 – present)

== October 2025 ==
=== 3 October ===
- The Gaza Health Ministry said that at least 63 people were killed in Israeli attacks throughout Gaza in the past 24 hours, increasing its count of the Palestinian death toll in Gaza to 66,288. (Note: Casualty count includes both militants and civilians.)
- Hamas carried out a large-scale raid in Khan Yunis targeting the Al-Mujaida clan, with the Israeli Air Force and the Israeli-backed CTSF involved in the fighting.
- Hamas accepted a Trump administration plan to end the war and release all remaining hostages in Gaza pending further conditions.
- The IDF said that it attacked a site in southern Lebanon that violated the ceasefire and posed a threat on Israel by managing Hezbollah's armed attacks and defenses, including weapons, structures used for militant activities, and underground infrastructure.
- The IDF said that two militants armed with RPGs and guns were killed after they tried to approach Israeli soldiers in Gaza City.

=== 4 October ===
- The Gaza Health Ministry said that at least 66 people were killed in Israeli attacks throughout Gaza in the past 24 hours. In addition, the health ministry added more than 700 names to the list, increasing its count of the Palestinian death toll in Gaza to 67,074.
- The IDF was ordered to halt its ground offensive to capture Gaza City.
- Israel Hayom reported that during the weekend, multiple strikes were conducted in the Gaza Strip by the IDF in order to defend its forces.

=== 5 October ===
- The Gaza Health Ministry said that at least 65 people were killed in Israeli attacks throughout Gaza in the past 24 hours, increasing its count of the Palestinian death toll in Gaza to 67,139.
- The Gaza Health Ministry said that one person died due to malnutrition in the last day, increasing its count of the death toll from malnutrition since the start of the war to 460.
- The IDF said that it downed a "hostile" UAV that was launched at Israel from Yemen.

=== 6 October ===
- The Gaza Health Ministry said that at least 21 people were killed in Israeli operations throughout Gaza in the past 24 hours, increasing its count of the Palestinian death toll in Gaza to 67,160.
- The IDF said that about a week prior in Gaza City it had uncovered several long range rockets ready to be fired at central Israel, along with explosives, radios, cartridges and other weapons.
- Lebanese media reported that an Israeli drone strike in southern Lebanon killed two people including a woman. The IDF said that one of those killed was a leading Hezbollah militant and accused him of violating the ceasefire by rebuilding Hezbollah's air defenses.
- The IDF said that it attacked several Hezbollah targets in Beqaa including camps that were used for training militants.

=== 7 October ===
- The Gaza Health Ministry said that the Palestinian death toll in Gaza has increased to 67,173.
- The IDF said that it killed a Hezbollah militant whom it accused of taking over private properties from a Lebanese village in favor of militant activities that violate the ceasefire, such as storing weaponry and surveillance, and another Hezbollah militant whom it accused of rebuilding militant infrastructure using heavy equipment.
- The IDF said that four "hostile" UAVs that were launched at Israel from Yemen were downed in less than one hour.

=== 8 October ===
- The Gaza Health Ministry said that at least ten people were killed in Israeli attacks throughout Gaza in the past 24 hours, increasing its count of the Palestinian death toll in Gaza to 67,183.
- Israel and Hamas agreed to the first stage of a Gaza truce plan from the US through the mediation of US, Qatar, Turkey and Egypt.
- The IDF intercepted the Freedom Flotilla Coalition & Thousand Madleens in the Mediterranean Sea as it attempted to break the blockade of the Gaza Strip.
- The IDF said that it killed several Hamas militants in Gaza who tried to attack its forces.

=== 9 October ===
- The Gaza Health Ministry said that at least 11 people were killed in Israeli attacks throughout Gaza in the past 24 hours, increasing its count of the Palestinian death toll in Gaza to 67,194.
- The Israeli cabinet ratified the hostage agreement with Hamas, setting a truce in Gaza.

=== 10 October ===
- The Gaza Health Ministry said that at least 17 people were killed in Israeli attacks throughout Gaza in the past 24 hours, increasing its count of the Palestinian death toll in Gaza to 67,211.
- The truce agreement between Israel and Hamas went into effect at noon local time.

=== 11 October ===
- The Gaza Health Ministry increased its count of the Palestinian death toll in Gaza to 67,682. The increase is due to bodies being dug out from rubble.
- Lebanon's Health Ministry said that Israeli airstrikes in Msayleh destroyed a large number of vehicles and killed one Syrian national and wounded six others, including two women. The IDF said it targeted Hezbollah sites storing heavy machinery used for rebuilding militant infrastructure.

=== 12 October ===
- The Gaza Health Ministry said that the bodies of 124 people killed due to Israeli attacks, 117 of them recovered from rubble arrived in hospitals throughout Gaza in the past 24 hours, increasing its count of Palestinian death toll in Gaza to 67,806.
- The IDF said that it killed a militant whom it accused of violating the ceasefire agreement and working on restoring Hezbollah's militant infrastructure in south Lebanon. It also said that heavy machinery that was used to restore Hezbollah's militant infrastructure was destroyed.
- Clashes were reported between Hamas and members of the Palestinian Doghmush clan.

=== 13 October ===
- The Gaza Health Ministry said that the bodies of 63 people killed due to Israeli attacks, 60 of them recovered from rubble arrived in hospitals throughout Gaza in the past 24 hours, increasing its count of Palestinian death toll in Gaza to 67,869.
- All 20 remaining living Israeli hostages were released by Hamas and hundreds of Palestinian prisoners were released by Israel, as part of the first phase of the Gaza peace plan. Hamas also said that it handed over the bodies of four deceased hostages.
- The 2025 Gaza peace summit was held in Sharm El Sheikh, Egypt, attended by leaders from about 30 countries and several international organisations.
- Hamas killed at least 33 people in Gaza City as part of the ongoing crackdown against opposing clans inside Gaza. Videos of the executions were posted by Hamas affiliated channels. It is disputed whether Hamas followed due judicial process for sentencing. It was condemned by Palestinian human rights monitors, such as Al Mezan. Palestinian president Mahmoud Abbas condemned the killings as "heinous crimes and field executions".
- IDF's radio said that the IDF found a mosque that was allegedly used as a command center and training camp, storage of weapons, RPGs, and intelligence including a replica of a kibbutz in the vicinity of Gaza. It added that a group of militants that crossed the yellow line was arrested by the IDF.

=== 14 October ===
- The Gaza Health Ministry said that the bodies of 44 people killed due to Israeli attacks, 38 of them recovered from rubble arrived in hospitals throughout Gaza in the past 24 hours, increasing its count of Palestinian death toll in Gaza to 67,913.
- A first batch of Palestinian bodies were handed over by Israel to Gaza.
- Hamas said that it handed over the remains of four more Israeli hostages. After a forensic check Israel said that one of the bodies does not belong to a deceased hostage.
- Gaza health officials said that Israeli forces killed at least nine Palestinians trying to check for their homes in northern Gaza City and southern Khan Yunis. The IDF said it killed individuals who crossed the yellow line of the ceasefire and approached its forces.
- Under the ceasefire terms, Israel was to permit up to 600 humanitarian aid trucks to enter Gaza each day. Since then, the limit has been reduced to 300, and the Rafah border crossing was closed, with Israeli officials attributing the change to delays in recovering the bodies of Israeli hostages. Hamas previously indicated that recovering the bodies of some deceased hostages may take longer, as not all burial sites amid the Gaza's widespread rubble are known.

=== 15 October ===
- The Gaza Health Ministry said that the bodies of 25 people killed due to Israeli attacks, 16 of them recovered from rubble arrived in hospitals throughout Gaza in the past 24 hours, increasing its count of Palestinian death toll in Gaza to 67,938.
- The remains of two more hostages were handed over by Hamas to Israel.
- Forty-five more Palestinian bodies were received by the Gaza Health Ministry from Israel, bringing the total number of bodies returned to Gaza according to the ceasefire agreement to 90.

=== 16 October ===
- The Gaza Health Ministry said that the bodies of 29 people killed due to Israeli attacks, 22 of them recovered from rubble arrived in hospitals throughout Gaza in the past 24 hours, increasing its count of Palestinian death toll in Gaza to 67,967.
- Thirty bodies of Palestinians were handed over by Israel.
- The Houthis said that their military chief of staff died from injuries sustained from the 28 August 2025 Israeli attacks on Yemen along with his 13 year-old son and "several of his companions".
- Israeli airstrikes in Lebanon killed one person in Shmustar, injured six in Ansar, and injured a seventh in Bnaafoul. A Lebanese Army Intelligence source said that the IAF conducted 31 attacks against Hezbollah targets in east and south Lebanon. The IDF said that one of the targets was a quarry used by Hezbollah and accused the militant group of using it to violate the truce.

=== 17 October ===
- The remains of one more hostage were handed over by Hamas to Israel.
- The IDF said that it demolished a building used by Hezbollah in Yaroun.
- Al Jazeera reported that Israeli fire hit at a vehicle carrying a displaced family in Zeitoun, Gaza City, killing 11 family members, including seven children. The IDF said that the vehicle crossed the ceasefire demarcation line.
- The IDF said it carried out an airstrike in the Gaza Strip against a militant cell which emerged from a tunnel and advanced towards its forces.

=== 18 October ===
- The Gaza Health Ministry said that the bodies of 29 people, 23 of them recovered from rubble, arrived in hospitals throughout Gaza in the past 48 hours, increasing its count of Palestinian death toll in Gaza to 68,116.
- Fifteen bodies of Palestinians were handed over by Israel to Gaza.
- The remains of two more hostages were handed over by Hamas to Israel.

=== 19 October ===
- The Gaza Health Ministry increased its count of Palestinian death toll in Gaza to 68,159.
- Fifteen bodies of Palestinians were received by the Gaza Health Ministry from Israel.
- The IDF said that militants launched RPGs and conducted sniper fire against its forces operating in Rafah, prompting it to carry out strikes in Gaza. It said that two soldiers were killed in the incident. It added that it struck dozens of Hamas targets. al-Qassam Brigades said that communication with rest of its units in Rafah had been cut off for months and "we are not responsible for any incidents occurring in those areas." The Nasser Hospital said that one of those Israeli attacks hit a tent in al-Mawasi, killing at least four people, including two children and a woman.
- The IDF said that it struck militants who approached its forces in Beit Lahia.
- Transfer of aid into Gaza was halted by Israeli government, and resumed the next day.
- The IDF later said that they resumed enforcing the truce.

=== 20 October ===
- The remains of one more hostage was handed over by Hamas to Israel.

=== 21 October ===
- Fifteen bodies of Palestinians were handed over by Israel to Gaza.
- The remains of two more hostages were handed over by Hamas to Israel.

=== 22 October ===
- Thirty bodies of Palestinians were handed over by Israel to Gaza.

=== 23 October ===
- Lebanese Health Ministry and NNA reported that Israeli strikes in eastern and southern Lebanon killed at least four people, including an elderly woman. The IDF said it had targeted Hezbollah sites in east and north Lebanon, including "a military camp and a site for the production of precision missiles" in the Bekaa Valley. It also stated that it targeted several militant targets, including a Hezbollah training camp and a "weapons storage facility" in the Nabatieh area.

=== 24 October ===
- L'Orient–Le Jour reported that an Israeli strike in Toul killed two people including a woman and injured two others. Among the dead was the logistics chief of Hezbollah's Southern Front, who the IDF accused of violating the ceasefire by restoring Hezbollah's militant infrastructure.

=== 25 October ===
- A doctor working in Gaza said that two 6 year-old twin boy and girl were injured by unexploded ordnance in Gaza City. The Gaza Health Ministry said that five children were injured by unexploded ordnance in the last week.
- The IDF said that it killed a militant whom it accused of violating the truce by attempting to execute an attack on its forces in Nuseirat.
- The IDF said that it killed a commander from the anti tank unit of the Radwan Force whom it accused of attempting to reestablish militant infrastructure in Jibshit, southern Lebanon.

=== 26 October ===
- Al Jazeera reported that an Israeli strike in al-Hafir killed two people, including a Syrian national. The IDF said that it killed a Hezbollah member who was responsible for trafficking weapons from Syria to Lebanon.
- Al Jazeera reported that an Israeli airstrike in An-Naqoura killed one person, who the IDF said was Hezbollah's representative to Ras Biyyada.

=== 27 October ===
- Hamas said that it handed over the remains of a hostage to Israel.

=== 28 October ===
- The IDF said that its forces in Rafah were hit by sniper fire and RPGs, which killed one of its soldiers. The IDF also said that it returned fire. al-Qassam Brigades denied involvement and reiterated its commitment to the truce.
- Netanyahu ordered Israeli forces to immediately retaliate with "powerful strikes" in Gaza. Hamas said that it postponed the planned handover of the remains of a deceased hostage it had recovered from a tunnel in Gaza after Israeli attacks.

=== 29 October ===
- Local health officials said that Israeli attacks in Gaza killed at least 104 people including children and women. The IDF said it targeted dozens of Hamas targets, including militants, observation posts, weapons depots, mortar firing positions and tunnels. It also said that it targeted a number of senior Hamas militants, including 21 commanders and participants of the 7 October attacks including a Nukhba Force commander. Israeli forces later said that the truce was back on in Gaza.
- The IDF said that it killed a Hezbollah's logistics chief in Qana, who it accused of helping rebuild infrastructure, in a strike on 14 October.
- The IDF said that it struck a Hezbollah tunnel and rocket launcher in Mahmudiyah.

=== 30 October ===
- The remains of two more Israeli hostages were handed over by Hamas to Israel.
- Israeli forces raided the Blida town hall, killing a municipal worker. The IDF said that it was dismantling Hezbollah infrastructure.

=== 31 October ===
- Thirteen bodies of Palestinians were handed over by Israel to Gaza.
- The unidentified remains of three people were transferred by the Red Cross from Hamas to Israel.
- The IDF said that it struck and killed a Hezbollah maintenance officer who was rebuilding militant infrastructure in Kounin.
- The IDF said that it killed a Radwan Force member who planned attacks on Israel and helped restore Hezbollah infrastructure in a drone strike in Nabatieh.

== November 2025 ==
=== 1 November ===
- The Abu Kabir Forensic Institute, using DNA tests, ruled the remains handed over by Hamas the previous day did not belong to any of the hostages. Hamas said Israel had rejected its offer to provide samples of unidentified decedents and asked the remains for analysis. It added "We handed the bodies over to stop the claims of Israel."
- Lebanon's health ministry said four people were killed and three others were injured in an Israeli strike on a car in the Nabatieh District. The IDF said those killed were Redwan Force militants.

=== 2 November ===
- The remains of three more Israeli hostages were handed over by Hamas to Israel.

=== 3 November ===
- Forty-five bodies of Palestinians were handed over by Israel to Gaza.
- The IDF said it killed a militant of the Radwan Force in an airstrike in Nabatieh. It later conducted a separate strike in Ayta ash-Shaab, killing an alleged Hezbollah militant who was surveilling Israeli soldiers.

=== 4 November ===
- The IDF said it killed a militant who crossed into an area in Jabalia that is still under Israeli control and posed an "imminent threat" to its forces.
- The remains of one more Israeli hostage were handed over by Hamas to Israel.

=== 5 November ===
- Fifteen bodies of Palestinians were handed over by Israel to Gaza.
- The remains of one more hostage were handed over by Hamas to Israel.
- An Israeli strike on a car in Burj Rahal killed one person and injured another. The IDF said it killed a Radwan Force militant who was behind attacks on Israel.

=== 6 November ===
- An Israeli airstrike between Toura and Al-Aabbassiyah, Tyre District, killed one person and injured three others. The IDF said it targeted militants of Hezbollah's construction unit.
- The IDF said it carried out strikes on infrastructure and arms depots belonging to the Radwan Force in several towns in southern Lebanon. The Lebanese Health Ministry said one person was injured.

=== 7 November ===
- The remains of one more Israeli hostage were handed over by the PIJ and Hamas to Israel.
- Turkey issued arrest warrants to 37 Israeli officials for crimes against humanity, including Prime Minister Benjamin Netanyahu, Defence Minister Israel Katz, National Security Minister Itamar Ben-Gvir and IDF chief Lieutenant General Eyal Zamir.

=== 8 November ===
- Fifteen bodies of Palestinians were handed over by Israel to Gaza.
- Lebanon's National News Agency reported that two brothers were killed in an Israeli airstrike near Shebaa. The IDF said they were arms smugglers belonging to the Hezbollah-affiliated Lebanese Resistance Brigades.
- The Lebanese health ministry said an Israeli drone strike hit a car near a hospital in Bint Jbeil injuring seven people.
- An Israeli strike in Baraashit killed one person and injured four others. The IDF said it conducted a drone strike that killed a Hezbollah militant who it accused of attempting to rebuild militant infrastructure.

=== 9 November ===
- The remains of one more Israeli hostage dating from 2014 were handed over by Hamas to Israel.
- The IDF said it conducted strikes in Houmine El Faouqa and as-Sawana, killing two Hezbollah militants.

=== 10 November ===
- Fifteen bodies of Palestinians were handed over by Israel to Gaza.
- Israel conducted a wave of strikes in southern and eastern Lebanon. The IDF said it struck a rocket launching site in the south, several sites in Nabatieh, and weapons storage and manufacturing sites in the Beqaa Valley. A strike targeting a car on a highway in Al-Baisariyah killed one person, who the IDF said was a Hezbollah arms smuggler.

=== 11 November ===
- The Gaza Health Ministry said at least three people were killed in Israeli attacks throughout Gaza in the past 24 hours, increasing its count of the Palestinian death toll in Gaza to 69,182.

=== 13 November ===
- The remains of one more Israeli hostage were handed over by Hamas to Israel.
- The IDF said it struck Hezbollah sites in southern Lebanon that were located near civilian areas.

=== 14 November ===
- Fifteen bodies of Palestinians were handed over by Israel to Gaza.
- Lebanon imposed more stringent regulations on money changers and transfer companies as part of efforts to stop Hezbollah funding.

=== 16 November ===
- The IDF said it killed a Hezbollah militant in Al-Mansouri.

=== 17 November ===
- The United Nations Security Council adopted Resolution 2083 welcoming the formation of the Board of Peace and authorizing an International Stabilization Force.

=== 18 November ===
- The Lebanese Health Ministry said Israeli strikes on the Ain al-Hilweh Palestinian refugee camp near Sidon killed at least 13 people and injured others. The IDF said it targeted a Hamas training facility. Hamas denied the allegation.
- The IDF said it killed a Hezbollah militant in Bint Jbeil and another Hezbollah militant in Blida that was seen collecting intelligence on IDF troops.

=== 19 November ===
- Lebanese media reported an Israeli attack hit a car in At-Tiri, killing one person and injuring 11. The reports said a school bus passed by the area at the time of the attack, resulting in the wounding of the driver and several children.
- The IDF said several militants fired at its troops in Khan Yunis, resulting in no injuries. Hamas denied it had fired at Israeli forces. In response the IDF conducted a wave of strikes across Gaza. Medics said at least 28 Palestinians, including nine children, were killed.
- The IDF carried out a wave of strikes in several towns in southern Lebanon, targeting what it said were arms depots belonging to Hezbollah's rocket unit.

=== 20 November ===
- Local health authorities said an Israeli strike hit a home in Bani Suheila, killing three people including an infant girl and injuring 15 others.
- The IDF said a senior Hamas militant who served as a naval commander and another Hamas militant who held several hostages were killed in airstrikes the day prior.

=== 21 November ===
- The IDF said it killed six Hamas militants and captured five others after they emerged from tunnels in eastern Rafah.
- The IDF said it killed a Hezbollah member near Froun.

=== 22 November ===
- The Gaza Health Ministry increased its count of the Palestinian death toll in Gaza to 69,733.
- Health officials in Gaza said Israeli strikes in Gaza killed at least 24 people including a woman and one child and injured at least 54 others including children. The IDF said they launched strikes after a militant crossed into an area it held and fired towards its forces in south Gaza, without causing casualties. Hamas denied Israeli accusations. Prime Minister Netanyahu's office said those killed include five senior Hamas militants.
- The IDF said its forces killed 11 militants in the Rafah area and arrested six others who attempted to escape an underground structure. It also said it killed two others who crossed into areas held by it in northern Gaza and approached its forces.
- Lebanon's health ministry said an Israeli strike hit a car in Zawtar al-Sharqiyah killing one person, while a separate drone attack in Shaqra injured five others. The IDF later said it conducted strikes in Mayfadoun and Houla, killing two Hezbollah militants.
- The IDF said it struck Hezbollah rocket launchers in southern Lebanon and two militant sites in the Beqaa Valley.

=== 23 November ===
- The Lebanese Health Ministry said at least five people were killed and 25 others were injured when an Israeli strike hit the fourth floor of an apartment building in Beirut's Haret Hreik neighborhood. The IDF said it targeted Hezbollah's chief of staff, Haytham Ali Tabatabai. Hezbollah confirmed Tabatabai was killed alongside four other militants.

=== 24 November ===
- A Palestinian man was killed by an Israeli drone attack in the Israeli-controlled parts of Bani Suheila.

=== 25 November ===
- The remains of one more Israeli hostage were handed over by PIJ and Hamas to Israel.

=== 26 November ===
- Fifteen bodies of Palestinians were handed over by Israel to Gaza.
- The IDF said six militants who emerged from an underground tunnel in Rafah were hit by an airstrike and killed in battle with its forces. It added that eight others were arrested by it while they emerged from a tunnel in the last week.

=== 27 November ===
- The IDF said it conducted strikes on several Hezbollah sites in southern Lebanon, including arms facilities and outposts.

=== 29 November ===
- Family said that an Israeli strike east of Khan Yunis killed two children who crossed the yellow line.

=== 30 November ===
- The IDF said it killed four Hamas militants who attempted to escape from a tunnel in eastern Rafah.

== December 2025 ==
=== 2 December ===
- Hamas handed over "findings" to Israel. Israel said that it did not belong to a deceased hostage.

=== 3 December ===
- President Trump's 20-point Gaza plan was formally approved by the Knesset.
- The remains of one more hostage were handed over by Hamas to Israel.
- The IDF said five of its soldiers were injured, one seriously, during clashes with Hamas militants who attempted to escape from a tunnel in eastern Rafah. Gaza's civil defense said an Israeli strike hit a shelter camp in the vicinity of Kuwaiti Field Hospital in Al-Mawasi, killing five people including two children and injuring 32 others. The IDF said it targeted a Hamas militant.

=== 4 December ===
- The IDF said it killed almost 40 Hamas militants trapped in tunnels under Rafah, in an area it controlled.
- Yasser Abu Shabab, the leader of the Israeli-backed anti-Hamas group Popular Forces died shortly before arrival at an Israeli hospital after being injured in clashes with a local family in Gaza.

=== 6 December ===
- Local health authorities reported seven people were killed due to Israeli fire in Beit Lahia, Jabalia and Zeitoun, including an elderly woman. The IDF said it opened fire on those who crossed the yellow line in two separate incidents.

=== 7 December ===
- Local medics reported that apparent Israeli gunfire killed a three-year old girl near the ceasefire line in al-Mawasi.

=== 8 December ===
- The IDF said it struck Hezbollah militant infrastructure in southern Lebanon, including a training site used by the Radwan Force.

=== 9 December ===
- UNIFIL stated its observers came under fire during a patrol in the Blue Line near the village of Sarda. No injuries were reported. The IDF said it warned a suspect approaching its forces stationed inside south Lebanon.

=== 10 December ===
- The director of the Shifa hospital in Gaza said an Israeli strike in the Jabalia refugee camp killed a 17-year-old boy.
- The IDF said it had killed a person it described as an immediate threat after the individual crossed the Yellow Line.

=== 11 December ===
- Medics said an Israeli strike in Jabalia killed a woman and injured some others.

=== 13 December ===
- An Israeli attack west of Gaza City killed five people and injured at least 25 others including civilians. The IDF said it targeted senior al-Qassam Brigades commander Ra'ad Sa'ad and accused him of violating the ceasefire. Prime Minister Netanyahu and Defence Minister Israel Katz said it was a response to a Hamas attack in which an explosive device wounded two Israeli troops. Later, the IDF added that the strike also killed an al-Qassam Brigades financial chief. Hamas confirmed Sa'ad's death the next day, adding that he was killed "alongside his brothers”.

=== 14 December ===
- The Gaza Interior Ministry announced the assassination of Home Security officer Lt. Col. Ahmed Zamzam, who was shot by gunmen at Al-Maghazi refugee camp. It also said he was killed by an Israeli-backed group under Israeli orders, citing an initial probe.
- The IDF said it conducted three separate drone strikes targeting Hezbollah members in Yatar, Bint Jbeil, and Jwaya, killing three militants whom it accused of violating the truce.

=== 16 December ===
- The IDF said it struck two Hezbollah militants separately in Taybeh and Sebline.

=== 17 December ===
- Health officials said that an Israeli mortar shell that hit a residential area in central Gaza City injured at least 10 people, some seriously. The IDF said the mortar was fired during an operation in the area of the "Yellow Line", but deviated from its intended target.

=== 18 December ===
- The Trump administration sanctioned two more ICC judges for probing alleged Israeli war crimes in Gaza.

=== 19 December ===
- Integrated Food Security Phase Classification said the spread of famine in Gaza has stopped, but the strip still faces starvation. The Netanyahu government denied a famine.
- Gaza's civil defence agency spokesman said that an Israeli strike hit a school serving as shelter for displaced people in Tuffah, killing at least six people including women and children. The IDF said it opened fire towards "suspicious individuals to eliminate the threat", and "regrets any harm to uninvolved individuals".

=== 20 December ===
- Doctors at Nasser Hospital said that a 29-day-old infant boy died due to hypothermia in Gaza.

=== 21 December ===
- The IDF said it killed a Hezbollah militant in the Yatar area and accused him of violating the ceasefire by rebuilding Hezbollah's militant infrastructure. The IDF also said it struck snother target, which according to Lebanese authorities wounded one person.

=== 22 December ===
- Palestinian medical sources said that two Palestinians were killed by Israeli fire in eastern Gaza City.
- An Israeli strike hit a car on the Aqtnit–Qantara road in Sidon District in Lebanon, killing three people, including a Lebanese soldier. The IDF said that it struck three Hezbollah militants in the Sidon area and accused that they violated the truce by working on operations against the IDF and attempted rebuilding Hezbollah's infrastructure. However, Lebanon denied that the deceased soldier had links to the group.

=== 24 December ===
- The IDF accused Hamas of violating the truce by hitting an APC with explosive device, causing injuries to one of its soldier.

=== 25 December ===
- The IDF said that they killed Hussein Mahmoud Marshad al-Jawhari, a senior operative of the Iranian Quds Force's Unit 840 in Lebanon.
- The IDF said that it killed a Hezbollah militant near al-Jumayjimah and accused him of violating the truce by rebuilding Hezbollah's militant infrastructure.

=== 29 December ===
- Al-Qassam Brigades confirmed the death of its spokesman Abu Obaida. It also confirmed death of the Rafah Brigade's commander Muhammad Shabana and Hakam Al Essa, who ran its arms and combat services.

=== 30 December ===
- The Israeli Ministry of Diaspora Affairs announced that it would ban 37 humanitarian organizations from operating in Gaza within 36 hours for failing to provide personal staff data required for new security screenings.

== January 2026 ==
=== 1 January ===
- An apparent Israeli strike hit Jabalia an-Nazla in northern Gaza, killing a child.

=== 3 January ===
- The IDF said that in northern Gaza it have uncovered and destroyed a rocket launcher and accused that it was loaded and ready to fire at southern Israel.

=== 4 January ===
- The IDF said that it killed two Hezbollah militants in al-Jumayjimah in southern Lebanon, accusing them of violating the truce.

=== 5 January ===
- Officials at Nasser Hospital said that an Israeli strike hit a tent in al-Mawasi, killing a five-year-old girl and her uncle and injuring two other children. The IDF said that it targeted a Hamas militant whom it accused of violating the ceasefire.
- The IDF said that it struck several Hezbollah and Hamas militant infrastructure sites in eastern and southern Lebanon.

=== 6 January ===
- The Gaza Health Ministry increased its count of the Palestinian death toll in Gaza to 71,391.
- The IDF said that it killed two Hezbollah militants near Kherbet Selem and accused them of violating the ceasefire. The Lebanese Health Ministry said that another person was seriously wounded in the strike.

=== 7 January ===
- The IDF said it killed a militant from Hezbollah's Unit 127 in Jwaya whom it accused of violating the truce.

=== 8 January ===
- The Lebanese army claimed that it had "effectively and tangibly" achieved the aim of a state monopoly on weapons in the south Lebanon, but that additional work needed to be done to remove tunnels and unexploded ordnance.
- A family relative said that apparent Israeli fire hit a house in Falluja neighborhood of Jabalia, killing an 11-year-old girl.
- The IDF said it killed a Hezbollah drone operator in Zaita and accused him of violating the ceasefire.

=== 11 January ===
- Israeli fire killed two people in Bani Suhaila and another person in Tuffah. The IDF said it had hit a militant in north Gaza who approached its forces.
- The IDF said that it struck Hezbollah weapon storage sites in several areas in southern Lebanon and killed a militant near Bint Jbeil.

=== 12 January ===
- Three people who had crossed the truce line in the vicinity of Morag corridor were killed by the IDF, that said that the 3 approached its forces and posed an "immediate threat", adding that they later found weapons and intelligence-gathering equipment on them. An Israeli-backed armed group in south Gaza said that it killed a senior police officer in Khan Yunis. The Gaza Interior Ministry said that he was shot dead in al-Mawasi. Hamas said that militants killed by the IDF were pursuing militiamen who killed the police officer.

=== 14 January ===
- The US announced that Gaza is entering the second stage of the truce plan brokered with the help of President Trump.

=== 15 January ===
- Local sources said that Israeli attacks throughout Gaza killed at least 10 people including a senior al-Qassam Brigades militant, his wife, his 16-year-old daughter, two other family members, a senior al-Quds Brigades militant and a Hamas policeman. The IDF accused militants of violating the truce and said that the al-Qassam Brigades militant commanded its central camps operations, had a significant role in preparing for the 7 October attacks, and oversaw a lethal attack in 1995. The IDF also said that the al-Quds Brigades militant commanded its Rocket and Missile Array in the Central Camps area. It added that other strikes killed a commander of sniper activities for al-Qassam Brigades in Deir al Balah, two Hamas militants whom it accused of attempting to rebuild militant infrastructure, a person who crossed the yellow line and "posed a threat" to its forces.

=== 20 January ===
- The IDF said that it uncovered a weapons cache with firearms, RPGs and various combat equipment from a tunnel shaft in south Gaza as part of operations to destroy militant infrastructure on the Israeli side of the Gaza truce line.

=== 21 January ===
- AP reported that Israeli strikes in Gaza killed at least 11 people including two 13-year-old boys, three journalists and a woman. The IDF said it had identified suspects who were operating a drone which posed a threat to its forces in one of those incidents.
- SOHR reported that the IDF carried out airstrikes on four crossing points on the Syria-Lebanon border used for smuggling operations and transporting arms to Hezbollah, killing a weapons dealer.

=== 22 January ===
- The IDF said that a reservist from the Menashe Regional Brigade's 941st Battalion died from injuries sustained during combat in Rafah in October 2025.
- The director of the Shifa Hospital said that four people were killed in Israeli strikes east of Gaza City.

=== 24 January ===
- The Al-Shifa Hospital in Gaza City said that an Israeli strike in Gaza killed a 13-year-old boy and a 15-year-old boy while they were searching for firewood.
- The IDF said it had targeted individuals who crossed the Yellow Line, accusing them of planting explosives.

=== 25 January ===
- Medics said that two people were killed due to Israeli fire east of Tuffah while one person was allegedly killed by Israeli forces in Khan Yunis. Explosion of an Israeli drone on the rooftop of a multi-floor building in Gaza City injured four civilians in the street nearby. IDF spokespersons said that they were not aware of the incident in Khan Yunis and that a camera on a roof of a "structure" in Gaza City was struck because it was used to monitor and advance attacks on the IDF.
- Israel announced that it started a "large scale operation" to find the body of the last hostage following information that he was buried at a cemetery in the Shuja'iyya-Daraj Tuffah area. Hamas claimed it had provided all the information it had about the hostage's remains.

=== 26 January ===
- The IDF announced that it recovered the body of the last hostage in Gaza. Hamas claimed it now has committed to all terms of the first stage of the truce.
- Gaza hospitals said that one person was killed was killed due to Israeli fire in Tuffah close to an area where Israeli forces carried out the search operation for the last hostage. Another person was killed in Bureij refugee camp.
- Nine Palestinian prisoners were released by Israel.
- Hezbollah said that a presenter for its Al-Manar television channel was killed in an Israeli airstrike in Tyre. The IDF said that he was also a Hezbollah militant who violated the truce by working to rehabilitate artillery capabilities of the group in south Lebanon.

=== 29 January ===
- An IDF official acknowledged the Gaza Health Ministry's estimate of about 70,000 Palestinians killed during the war, emphasising that the figure does not distinguish between members and non-members of militant groups, does not indicate how many people died as a result of the fighting, and does not include missing residents who may be buried under rubble. The official also rejected the ministry’s figures that 440 Palestinians had died because of malnutrition and starvation during the war.
- Fifteen bodies of Palestinians were handed over by Israel to Gaza.
- Nasser hospital said that two people were killed due to Israeli fire in Khan Yunis. One person was killed and another person was injured in another Israeli strike in central Gaza. The IDF said that it targeted a suspect whom it accused of violating the truce in south Gaza in one of the strikes and killed another person whom it accused of crossing the truce line and approaching its forces.

=== 30 January ===
- The IDF said that its airstrikes killed four armed people in central Gaza who it said approached its forces in the vicinity of the truce line.
- The IDF said that its air force killed at least three militants from a group of eight who emerged from a tunnel in the vicinity of Rafah.
- Palestinian media reported that a strike killed two people and injured several in the Maghazi refugee camp.
- The IDF said that it killed a Hezbollah militant whom it accused of violating the truce by attempting to restore the group's military infrastructure in south Lebanon.
- The IDF announced that it apprehended a key commander of al-Qassam Brigades's Eastern Rafah Battalion in an overnight operation.
- The IDF said that it is striking Hezbollah infrastructure in south Lebanon as a response to the group's alleged violation of the truce.

=== 31 January ===
- Hospitals in Gaza said that at least 30 people including six children and two women were killed in Israeli strikes in Gaza. One of those strikes hit a police station in Gaza City, killing at least 14 people including four policewomen, civilians and inmates held at the station and injuring others. The IDF said that the strikes followed what it described as truce violations the previous day, when it killed at least three militants emerging from a tunnel in an area in Rafah controlled by Israelis and four who approached its forces in the vicinity of the dividing line.

== February 2026 ==
=== 2 February ===
- The Gaza Health Ministry said at least five people were killed in Israeli attacks throughout Gaza in the past 24 hours, increasing its count of the Palestinian death toll in Gaza to 71,800. Per Palestinian reports, two people were killed in a strike in Nuseirat and the remaining in Mawasi, Khan Yunis and Jabalia. Among those killed reportedly include a 3-year-old boy. The IDF said that it targeted militants operating near the Yellow Line who approached its forces and "posed an imminent threat to them."
- Rafah border crossing was reopened.
- Local officials were detained by Israeli police for suspected pocketing of aid that was sent to Israeli charities and municipalities that were in need after the 7 October attacks.
- The IDF said that it targeted a Hezbollah militant in Harouf and accused the group of violating the truce.
- The IDF said that it targeted a Hezbollah militant in Ansariyah.
- Evacuation notices were issued by the IDF for two villages in south Lebanon, saying that they are situated in the vicinity of buildings used by Hezbollah as "military infrastructure." It later said that it attacked facilities used by Hezbollah to store arms and accused that one of those facilities were situated in the heart of a civilian area.

=== 3 February ===
- The Gaza Health Ministry said at least three people were killed in Israeli attacks throughout Gaza in the past 24 hours, increasing its count of the Palestinian death toll in Gaza to 71,803.
- Nasser Hospital in Khan Yunis said that one person was allegedly killed due to Israeli fire in southern Gaza city, some distance away from the area under the control of Israeli forces. The IDF said that it was not immediately aware of any strike in the area.

=== 4 February ===
- Twenty-four people including at least five children, seven women and a paramedic were killed due to Israeli strikes in Gaza. The IDF said that it was responding to a militant attack on its forces which critically wounded one soldier. al-Qassam Brigades leadership denied involvement. The IDF added that a strike in south Gaza targeted an al-Qassam Brigades platoon commander who participated in the 7 October attacks, while some of other strikes targeted three people who approached territory controlled by Israelis in Gaza, posing an immediate danger to its forces, a militant whom it accused of killing a soldier hostage, a leader of the al-Quds Brigades in north Gaza and it "regrets any harm caused to uninvolved civilians".

=== 6 February ===
- An IDF spokesman issued an evacuation order for people living in the vicinity of Gaza City's Zeitoun neighborhood, saying that a building in the area was used by al-Qassam Brigades militants. The IDF later destroyed the building in an airstrike.

=== 9 February ===
- Lebanon’s Health Ministry said that an Israeli drone hit a car in Yanouh, killing three people including a three-year-old child. The IDF said that it targeted a Hezbollah artillery official and accused him of violating the truce.
- An Al-Jama'a al-Islamiyya militant was captured by the IDF from Hebbarieh.
- The IDF killed four militants after they attempted to escape from a tunnel in Rafah and accused that they violated the truce by opening fire on its forces. Some sources close to Hamas identified one of them as senior Hamas official and co-founder Issa Annashar's son. An Israeli strike later hit an apartment in Gaza City, killing three people.
- Gaza health authorities said that Israeli fire in Deir Al-Balah killed a farmer.
- One person was killed by Israeli gunfire in Aita al-Shaab. The IDF said that it killed a Hezbollah militant and accused him of violating the truce.

=== 10 February ===
- Al-Aqsa Martyrs Hospital said that two people who were riding an electric bike were killed in an Israeli strike in eastern Deir Al-Balah in the vicinity of the truce line. Apparent Israeli fire later killed a woman in Maghazi refugee camp, while separate Israeli firing killed one person in Khan Yunis and another person in Jabalia. The IDF said it had conducted strikes targeting al-Qassam Brigades militants as a response to the incident in Rafah the previous day. Two of those killed were confirmed as al-Qassam Brigades militants.
- The IDF said that it killed a militant who was in charge of the snipers array in Gaza's Beit Hanoun, whom it accused of violating the truce by planning an upcoming attack on its forces. It added that he was responsible for the death of five soldiers and critical injuries to two others during the war.

=== 11 February ===
- The IDF announced that in the past week in Gaza it killed a militant who was involved in deadly bus bombings in Israel in 2004 and exiled to Gaza as part of the Gilad Shalit prisoner exchange.

=== 14 February ===
- The IDF said it killed a person in northern Gaza whom it accused of crossing the yellow line and approaching them. It later said that it killed two armed people in northern Gaza who had taken cover under debris on the Israeli-controlled side in the vicinity of its forces.

=== 15 February ===
- Hospital authorities in Gaza said Israeli fire killed at least 11 Palestinians, including five men in their 20s who were struck near the Yellow Line in eastern Khan Yunis. At least two of those killed were confirmed as al-Qassam Brigades militants. Five people were killed in another Israeli attack on a group of people in the Jabalia refugee camp's Falluja area. One man was killed due to an Israeli strike in Gaza City. The IDF said it had conducted multiple strikes as a response to several truce violations in the vicinity of the Yellow Line, including militants trying to hide in debris and others who tried to cross the line while armed.

=== 16 February ===
- Lebanon's health ministry said that four people, including a Syrian national, were killed in an Israeli airstrike on a vehicle in Majdal Anjar. The IDF said it targeted militants from the PIJ in Lebanon.

=== 18 February ===
- The IDF announced that a friendly fire incident killed one of its soldiers during combat in south Gaza.

=== 20 February ===
- Lebanon's Health Ministry, Lebanese media and security sources said that Israeli airstrikes in the Beqaa Valley killed 10 people and injured 50 others — including three children. Hezbollah confirmed the death of its eight militants including a senior commander in the strikes. The IDF said that it targeted Hezbollah command centers belonging to its missile force in Beqaa Valley and accused the militant group of violating the truce, saying that the facility was situated in the heart of a civilian area. A separate strike in Ain al-Hilweh camp killed two and injured one, which the IDF said targeted a Hamas command center and accused the militant group of violating the truce, saying that the facility was situated in the heart of a civilian area. Hamas confirmed that two of its members had been killed in the attack but said the targeted building belonged to a combined security unit made up of numerous Palestinian factions which is responsible with maintaining security in the camp.

=== 26 February ===
- Lebanon's Health Ministry and NNA reported that Israeli strikes in Beqaa Valley killed a 16-year-old Syrian boy and injured 29 others. The IDF said that it targeted eight Radwan Force militant compounds in Baalbek used for storing arms and training and accused the group of violating the truce.
- Two al-Qassam Brigades militants were killed and five other people were injured in an Israeli strike east of Gaza City.
- The IDF said that it killed a militant in south Gaza whom it accused of crossing into the area of Gaza held by Israel and posing a threat to its forces.

=== 27 February ===
- Gaza officials said that at least five people including four members of the Hamas-run police were killed in overnight Israeli strikes in Gaza.
- The IDF said that it killed several militants in Rafah after conducting strikes in response to an alleged violation of the truce.
- Aid groups barred for refusing to comply with Israeli rules were allowed by the Supreme Court of Israel to keep operating in Gaza and other Palestinian territories while it considers the case.

=== 28 February ===
- The Rafah crossing was closed by Israel, citing "security reasons" amid the start of the 2026 Iran war.

== March 2026 ==
=== 2 March ===
- Hezbollah fired projectiles towards Israel from Lebanon in response to the killing of Iranian Supreme Leader Ali Khamenei, prompting retaliatory strikes by the IDF. Hezbollah said that it targeted Mishmar HaCarmel missile defence site in the vicinity of Haifa. The Lebanese Health Ministry said at least 31 people were killed in Israeli attacks. Hezbollah later claimed that the attack was a "defensive act" after over a year of Israeli attacks despite a truce. It added that it restarted fighting to force Israel to stop its aggression and evacuate from seized Lebanese territories, emphasising that the move was unrelated to the Iran war. The IDF said that Hezbollah intelligence chief, Hussain Makled, was killed in the strikes.
- Lebanon banned military activities by Hezbollah.

=== 3 March ===
- The IDF carried out airstrikes in Beirut and deployed soldiers to several locations in southern Lebanon as part of a "forward defence" measure along the border. In response, Hezbollah said it had carried out drone and missile attacks on Ramat David airbase, the Meron monitoring base and Camp Yitzhak.

=== 4 March ===
- The Lebanese Health Ministry said that Israeli attacks in the past 24 hours killed 20 people and injured 283 others, raising its count of the death toll since the escalation to 72.
- Al Jazeera reported that the IDF carried out airstrikes in Beirut, Baalbek, Mount Lebanon, and Khiam, killing 11 people and injuring four others. Hezbollah said it had carried out attacks on IDF bases near Metula and Safed. The Lebanese Health Ministry said that those killed in Lebanon in the last 24 hours include seven children.

=== 5 March ===
- The Lebanese Health Ministry said that casualties since the escalation rose according to its count to 102 killed and 638 wounded in the past 24 hours.
- Four members of the Ghazali family (2 men and 2 children) were killed by an Israeli airstrike on their home during Iftar. The IDF claimed responsibility for the attack, alleging that the children's father (Ibrahim Ghazali) was in Hezbollah's anti-tank missile unit.
- Two Israeli soldiers were wounded during combat with Hezbollah militants in southern Lebanon, including an officer in serious condition.
- Israeli forces warned Lebanese to evacuate southern suburbs of Beirut.

=== 6 March ===
- The Lebanese Health Ministry said that casualties from Israeli attacks since the escalation rose according to its count to 217 killed and 798 wounded in the past 24 hours.
- Hezbollah warned Israelis to evacuate areas within 5 km (3.1 mi) of the Lebanon-Israel border, citing "the (Israeli) army's deployment of military vehicles and armoured personnel carriers in open areas, using these areas as military deployment points".
- The United Nations Office for Project Services announced that one of its fuel trucks was struck in Gaza one day prior. The IDF said that it was accidentally hit by a "firing component" fired by its navy.
- Eight Israeli soldiers were injured in a rocket attack by Hezbollah militants on an IDF position in northern Israel. Finance Minister Bezalel Smotrich's office said that those slightly wounded by the rocket strike included his son. Later, two soldiers were wounded in an anti-tank missile attack by Hezbollah militants in southern Lebanon.
- A missile strike hit the headquarters of Ghana's UNIFIL battalion, critically wounding two peacekeepers. A source said that early indications showed that Israeli tank fire hit a UN base in Lebanon. The IDF later admitted that its tank fire hit the base, saying that it regrets the incident.
- Israeli commandos conducted an overnight operation in Al-Nabi Shayth in search of its captured pilot Ron Arad, leading to a shootout. Airstrikes in the area killed 41 people and injured 40 others.
- The IDF said that its Golani Brigade in the past week killed eight Nukhba Force militants whom it accused of violating the truce.

=== 7 March ===
- The Lebanese Health Ministry said that casualties from Israeli attacks since the escalation rose according to its count to 294 killed and 1,023 wounded in the past 24 hours.
- Palestinian sources said that an Israeli strike hit a house in central Khan Yunis, killing a man and seriously wounding a young girl.

=== 8 March ===
- The Lebanese Health Ministry said that casualties from Israeli attacks since the escalation rose according to its count to 394 killed and 1,130 wounded in the past 24 hours.
- Gaza health officials said that an Israeli strike in western Gaza City killed three people including a paramedic. The IDF said that those killed two al-Qassam Brigades militants whom it accused of violating the truce by preparing to attack its forces. Gaza health officials also said that another Israeli strike hit a tent encampment in western Nuseirat, killing at least three people including two girls and injuring 10 others including children.
- Lebanon's health ministry said that four people were killed in an Israeli airstrike on a hotel room in central Beirut. The IDF said it targeted militants of the Iranian Quds Force.
- Anti-tank missiles fired by Hezbollah militants struck Israeli armored vehicles in southern Lebanon, killing two soldiers and lightly injuring another.

=== 9 March ===
- The Lebanese Health Ministry said that its count of the casualties from Israeli attacks since the escalation rose to 486 killed and 1,313 wounded in the past 24 hours.
- Lebanese media reported that Israeli tank fire in Al-Qlayaa killed a Lebanese Catholic priest.
- Defense Minister Israel Katz said that the IDF killed the leader of Hezbollah's Nasr Unit.
- Hezbollah rocket attacks at central Israel lightly wounded 18 people, with the group stating it targeted a communications site in the Elah Valley and a Home Front Command base in Ramla. Ynet reported that a kindergarten in Ramla was hit, and smoke was seen in Beit Shemesh. Later the IDF reported striking the launcher.
- Al Jazeera reported that an Israeli strike in Nuseirat refugee camp killed Palestinian journalist Amal Shamali.

=== 10 March ===
- The Lebanese Health Ministry said that its count of the casualties from Israeli attacks since the escalation rose to 570 killed and 1,444 wounded in the past 24 hours.

=== 11 March ===
- The Lebanese Health Ministry reported that casualties from Israeli attacks in Lebanon rose to 634 killed and 1,586 injured in the past 24 hours.
- The IDF said that Hezbollah fired 200 rockets at Israel, of which 80 failed to enter the country. It added that it managed to prevent the launch of additional 400 rockets.
- Ynet reported that in the past week, as part of the crackdown on its critics, Hamas killed three civilians in Gaza. Hamas claimed that one of those had been killed “by mistake due to suspicion about his vehicle.”

=== 12 March ===
- The Lebanese Health Ministry said that its count of the casualties from Israeli attacks since the escalation increased to 687 killed including 52 women and 92 children and 1,774 wounded in the past 24 hours.
- The IDF said that it killed the commander of the Imam Hossein Division and other key members of the unit in airstrikes the day prior. It also said that it killed a Hezbollah militant who served as commander of the Radwan Force's southern Lebanese branch.

=== 13 March ===
- The Lebanese Health Ministry said that Israeli attacks since the escalation killed according to its count 773 people and injured 1,933 others.
- The IDF said that it killed two senior members of Hezbollah's Badr Unit who managed rocket fire at Israel.
- The Lebanese health ministry said that an Israeli strike hit a healthcare facility in Burj Qalaouiyah killing 12 medics and injuring another.
- Israel destroyed the Zrarieh Bridge over the Litani River, citing its use in Hezbollah movements.

=== 14 March ===
- The Lebanese Health Ministry said that Israeli attacks since the escalation killed according to its count 826 people and injured 2,009 others, adding that 31 paramedics were among the dead.
- Palestinian medics said that three people including two 17-year-old boys were allegedly killed due to an Israeli strike in Gaza. The IDF said that it was not aware of the strike. Another Israeli strike in the vicinity of a police checkpoint in western Khan Yunis killed one person and injured several others.
- The IDF said it killed an IRGC commander in Lebanon who was both a member of Hezbollah's communications unit and the Quds Force's Palestine Corps.
- Hezbollah fired a cluster bomb at Metula.
- Twelve rockets were fired from Lebanon at Israel's Upper Galilee.
- Several rockets were fired from Lebanon at Israel's Krayot area, causing damage and prompting the closure of Israel's Highway 4 due to the impact of an explosive.

=== 15 March ===
- The Lebanese Health Ministry said that Israeli attacks since the escalation killed according to its count 850 people and injured 2,105 others.
- Al-Aqsa Martyrs Hospital said that an Israeli strike hit a home in Nuseirat, killing four people including a pregnant women, her 10-year-old son and their 15-year-old neighbour. The boy’s young brother was injured in the strike. The IDF said it targeted an al-Qassam Brigades militant in response to an earlier incident in which a militant allegedly opened fire at its forces.
- The Gaza Interior Ministry said that nine police officers were killed and 14 others were injured, mostly bystanders in an Israeli strike on a police vehicle on the Salah al-Din Road at the entrance of Zawaida.
- A Hamas official was killed in an Israeli strike in Sidon.
- An al-Qassam Brigades field commander who also served as a Hamas police officer was killed in an Israeli strike.

=== 16 March ===
- The Lebanese Health Ministry said that Israeli attacks since the escalation killed according to its count 886 people and injured 2,141 others.
- Hezbollah rocket attacks injured six people in Nahariya and injured a seventh near Kabri.
- A field commander in the northern brigade of the al-Qassam Brigades was killed by a missile launched from an Israeli drone. The IDF said that he was in charge of the naval force of the brigade.

=== 17 March ===
- The Lebanese Health Ministry said that Israeli attacks since the escalation killed 912 people and injured 2,221 others.
- Local health authorities said that three people including a child were killed and 12 others were injured in an Israeli strike on a vehicle in western Khan Yunis.
- An Israeli strike hit a car and a motorcycle in Nabatieh, killing one Lebanese soldier and injuring four other Lebanese soldiers.
- An al-Qassam Brigades field commander responsible for logistics and supply in Khan Yunis and two others in his vicinity were killed in an Israeli drone strike.
- An al-Qassam Brigades militant was critically injured in a targeted killing attempt by Israeli-backed gunmen in Gaza City's Zeitoun neighborhood. The attackers fled to areas controlled by Israelis in Gaza.

=== 18 March ===
- The Lebanese Health Ministry said that Israeli attacks since the escalation killed 968 people including 116 children, 77 women and 40 health workers and injured 2,432 others.
- The IDF said that it killed the commander of Hezbollah's Imam Hussein Division in Beirut a week after his predecessor was killed.
- Defence Minister Israel Katz said that Israeli forces destroyed two bridges above the Litani River that were used by Hezbollah to smuggle arms south.
- An Israeli kamikaze drone strike on a tent in al-Mawasi killed Muhammad Abu Shahla, senior field commander of the Khan Younis brigade and the brigade’s intelligence chief and injured several civilians.
- The IDF said that it had killed more than 20 Hezbollah militants and seized weapons in south Lebanon in the past 24 hours.
- Hezbollah fired a missile at the Gaza envelope that was downed by the IDF.

=== 19 March ===
- The Lebanese Health Ministry said that Israeli attacks since the escalation killed 1,001 people including 118 children, 79 women and 40 health workers and injured 2,584 others.
- An Israeli missile strike on the Al-Qasmiya Bridge over the Litani River injured two members of an RT crew filming nearby.
- The Rafah crossing was reopened for the first time since the start of the war with Iran.

=== 22 March ===
- An Israeli strike hit a police vehicle in the middle of Nuseirat camp, killing three male members of the police and injuring 10 others. Another Israeli strike hit north Gaza's Sheikh Radwan neighborhood, killing a leader of one of the armed groups of Fatah and wounding several others.
- An Israeli farmer was killed in Misgav Am. An Israeli investigation later found that he was killed by errant Israeli artillery fire. Hezbollah said that it targeted Israeli troops in the area.
- The IDF said that its strike in Majdal Selem killed a Redwan Force commander and two other Hezbollah militants.
- The IDF said that it and Shin Bet killed a Hamas militant in Lebanon who participated in financing the group's activities.

=== 24 March ===
- Hezbollah militants launched a rocket barrage towards northern Israel, killing a woman and injuring two others.

=== 25 March ===
- The Alma center reported that Hezbollah launched 105 attack waves on Israel on this day, making it the most intense day of attacks on Israel since the beginning of the 2026 Iran war. It also reported that since the beginning of the war a total of 1084 attack waves were launched from Lebanon to Israel.

=== 26 March ===
- Hezbollah militants launched rockets towards Nahariya, killing a man and injuring 14 others, one seriously.
- An Israeli soldier was killed and two other Israeli soldiers were lightly injured during a shootout with Hezbollah militants in southern Lebanon. Earlier, an anti-tank missile attack targeting Golani Brigade soldiers in southern Lebanon killed one and injured four.

=== 28 March ===
- Local health officials said that three policemen and three civilians, including a girl were killed and four others were injured in Israeli strikes on two police checkpoints in Khan Yunis.
- Two people were killed in an Israeli strike in Gaza City's Shuja'iyya neighborhood. A Hamas-affiliated news agency reported that they were killed in an Israeli strike after a Palestinian armed group backed by the Israeli government in Gaza had attempted to abduct them. Another person was killed in an Israeli strike on a vehicle in Khan Yunis.
- Overnight Hezbollah anti-tank missile and rocket strikes in southern Lebanon wounded nine Israeli soldiers, two seriously.
- The IDF said that it killed two senior militants from Hezbollah's communications unit in Beirut.
- Hezbollah’s al-Manar TV station said that an Israeli strike hit a vehicle in south Lebanon, killing its journalist and Al-Mayadeen TV station said that two of its journalists, including a female journalist, were also killed. The IDF said that the Al-Manar TV journalist was also a militant involved in Hezbollah intelligence who had reported on the locations of Israeli troops in south Lebanon and accused him of "incitement" against Israeli troops and civilians.
- A soldier of the IDF’s Paratroopers Brigade was killed in a Hezbollah rocket attack in southern Lebanon, increasing the number of IDF soldiers killed since the start of the war to five. The paratrooper was identified as Sgt. Moshe Katz, a native of New Haven, Connecticut.

=== 29 March ===
- Two Indonesian UNIFIL peacekeepers were killed and two others were injured when a projectile hit a base near Aadshit al-Qusayr.
- The Lebanese health ministry said that Forty-nine people were killed in Israeli attacks in Lebanon, increasing the Lebanese death toll according to their count since the beginning of the war to 1,238.

=== 30 March ===
- An overnight anti-tank missile attack in southern Lebanon killed an Israeli soldier and seriously injured another, increasing the IDF death toll since the start of the war to six. Six other troops were wounded in separate incidents.
- An Israeli strike hit a Lebanese Army checkpoint, killing one soldier and wounding other troops.
- The IDF said that it killed two militants from Hezbollah's Unit 1800, responsible for liaising with Palestinian militant groups, in Beirut.
- Two UNIFIL peacekeepers were killed and a third was seriously injured when an explosion struck their vehicle near Bani Haiyyan.
- Four soldiers from the Nahal Brigade's reconnaissance unit were killed and two others were wounded, one seriously, during a clash with Hezbollah militants in southern Lebanon, increasing the IDF death toll in Lebanon to 11.
- An Israeli soccer team had to halt a training session due to the danger posed by a rocket that was fired from Lebanon.

=== 31 March ===
- Two people including a two-year-old boy were killed in an Israeli strike in Khan Yunis. Three people were killed in another Israeli strike in Jabalia. Another Israeli strike hit a group of people in the vicinity of a police checkpoint in al-Mawasi, killing at least one person and injuring eight others.
- Israeli airstrikes in Jnah area of Beirut killed seven people and injured 26 others. The IDF said that an Israeli Navy strike in the capital killed Hajj Yusuf Ismail Hashem who served as the commander of Hezbollah's Southern Front and accused him of targeting Israeli civilians. The Lebanese group later confirmed his death, saying that he was killed alongside a group of second-tier and third-tier commanders.
- The IDF said that its unit 300 has uncovered dozens of launchers loaded with rockets in Lebanon aimed at Israel.
- Israeli media reported that Hezbollah launched 50 rockets on Israel, including 29 high-trajectory weapons and 17 attacks using UAVs.

== April 2026 ==
=== 1 April ===
- The Lebanese health ministry said that at least 50 people were killed in Israeli strikes in Lebanon in the last 24 hours, increasing its count of the death toll in Lebanon since 2 March to 1,318.
- The IDF said that it struck two currency exchange stores used by Hezbollah militants in Beirut.
- The Alma center reported that Hezbollah launched 33 waves of attacks on April 1st.

=== 2 April ===
- The Lebanese health ministry said that at least 27 people were killed in Israeli strikes in Lebanon in the previous 24 hours, increasing its count of the Lebanese death toll since 2 March to 1,345.
- i24NEWS reported that Hezbollah fired more than 130 rockets at Israel in the past day, and additional 260 of its rockets fell within Lebanon in its attempts to hit IDF soldiers.
- The IDF said that it killed more than 40 Hezbollah militants in the past day.
- The Alma center reported that Hezbollah launched 35 waves of attacks on April 2nd.

=== 3 April ===
- The Lebanese health ministry said that at least 23 people were killed in Israeli strikes in Lebanon in the previous 24 hours, increasing its count of the Lebanese death toll since the start of the war to 1,368.
- The IDF said that it has killed 1000 Hezbollah militants in the past month.
- Rockets were reportedly fired from Lebanon at northern Israel in coordination with Iranian rockets.

=== 4 April ===
- The Lebanese health ministry said that at least 54 people were killed in Israeli attacks in Lebanon in the previous 24 hours, increasing its count of the Lebanese death toll since the start of the war to 1,422.
- An IDF soldier from the 210th Division was killed and another was critically injured in a friendly fire incident during an overnight raid in southern Lebanon to capture a suspect believed to be aiding Hezbollah.
- The IDF issued an evacuation order for the Masnaa Border Crossing, saying that Hezbollah was using it for military purposes.

=== 5 April ===
- The Lebanese health ministry said that at least 39 people were killed in Israeli attacks in Lebanon in the previous 24 hours, increasing its count of the Lebanese death toll since the start of the war to 1,461.
- Local health authorities said that an Israeli strike hit a group of people in Jaffa Street in the vicinity of Gaza City's Daraj neighbourhood, killing four people and injuring others. The IDF said that it killed militants posing an immediate threat.
- The Lebanese Army announced that an Israeli strike in south Lebanon killed one of its soldiers.
- The IDF said that it found rocket launchers, RPGs, and surface-to-surface missiles allegedly stored in a school in Lebanon.
- Since the end of February the IDF said that it has detected 165 rockets that were launched by Hezbollah and struck within UNIFIL bases or close to them.
- Lebanon's health ministry said that seven people including a four-year-old girl were killed in an Israeli strike in Kfar Hatta following an Israeli overnight evacuation order instructing people to leave the village.
- Shafaq News reported that an Israeli airstrike in Ain Saadeh, Beirut, killed three people, including head of the Lebanese Forces' center in Yahchouch and his wife. The Lebanese Forces said that the strike targeted a member of the Quds Force, who apparently survived.

=== 6 April ===
- The Lebanese health ministry said that at least 36 people were killed in Israeli attacks in Lebanon in the previous 24 hours, increasing its count of the Lebanese death toll since the start of the war to 1,497.
- The Alma center reported that three Israeli civilians and 11 IDF soldiers were killed in the fighting in the Lebanese theater since the start of the war. It also reported that since 2 March, Hezbollah launched 1,121 waves of attacks towards Israel's territory, of which 70% were rocket attacks and 29% involved UAVs.

=== 7 April ===
- The Lebanese health ministry said that at least 33 people were killed in Israeli attacks in Lebanon in the previous 24 hours, increasing its count of the Lebanese death toll since the start of the war to 1,530.
- The Alma center reported that Hezbollah carried out 43 waves of attacks from Lebanon to Israel, including 10 rockets that were fired at Nahariya and injured two civilians, and 40 more rockets that were fired from Lebanon into Israeli communities.
- Israeli Prime Minister Benjamin Netanyahu asserted that the US-Israel-Iran ceasefire does not apply to Lebanon, contradicting mediator Pakistani Prime Minister Shehbaz Sharif's announcement.
- An Israeli soldier from the Golani Brigade was killed and five others were injured during a clash with Hezbollah militants in southern Lebanon, raising the IDF death toll to 12.

=== 8 April ===
- Hezbollah said that it halted attacks on Israel and on Israeli soldiers in Lebanon.
- The IDF said that it had targeted more than a hundred Hezbollah assets including headquarters, intelligence centers, missile infrastructure, sites related to the Radwan Force and aerial and naval units, killing at least 250 Hezbollah militants. Al Jazeera reported that the strikes killed at least 254 people and injured at least 1,165 others. In Beirut alone, at least 92 people were killed and at least 742 others were injured. Hezbollah claimed responsibility for launching rockets towards north Israel as a response to "cease-fire violations".
- Iranian media said that Iran paused Hormuz traffic over Israeli attacks in Lebanon.

=== 9 April ===
- Health and education officials in Gaza said that apparent Israeli fire killed a girl in Beit Lahia.
- Health officials in Gaza said that at least two people were killed in an Israeli strike in Jabalia, while one people was killed in another strike in Khan Yunis. The IDF said that it targeted a militant in north Gaza.
- The IDF said that it killed Ali Yusuf Harshi, the secretary and nephew of Hezbollah leader Naim Qassem, in an airstrike in Beirut.
- The IDF said that an airstrike in Sidon the day prior killed Maher Qassem Hamdan, the commander of the Lebanese Resistance Brigades in Shebaa, along with eight other militants.
- The IDF and Shin Bet said that they killed an al-Quds militant whom it accused of participating in the 7 October attacks and violating the ceasefire along with three other al-Qassam Brigades militants in a strike earlier this week in north Gaza.
- The IDF issued evacuation order for southern suburbs of Beirut, saying that it is only targeting Hezbollah militants and military targets.
- Israel Katz said that over 200 Hezbollah militants were killed in airstrikes the day prior.
- The Alma center reported that Hezbollah carried out at least 15 waves of attacks from Lebanon to Israel.

=== 10 April ===
- Hezbollah fired a missile at Ashdod in the early morning. The group said that it targeted Ashdod Naval Base.
- Mako reported that two IDF soldiers were injured by shrapnel from an explosive drone which fell in their vicinity in south Lebanon.
- Mako reported that Hezbollah fired more than 100 rockets at Israel since the beginning of the 2026 Iran war ceasefire. It also reported that those wounded in a rocket barrage from Lebanon which hit the Karmiel area include a 4-month-old Israeli infant and four Israeli children.
- A Hezbollah rocket barrage towards northern Israel hit and damaged a 1,500 year old church in Nahariya.

=== 11 April ===
- At least 67 people were killed in Israeli attacks in Lebanon in the previous 24 hours, increasing the Lebanese death toll since the start of the war to 2,020.
- Officials from Gaza's health ministry said that at least six people were killed when an Israeli strike hit a police checkpoint in Bureij camp. They also said that at least one person was killed in another Israeli strike in Beit Lahia. Several others were also wounded in those strikes. The IDF said that the strike in Bureij had killed militants of the al-Qassam Brigades that approached the yellow line, including a militant who participated in the 7 October attacks on Israel and took part in the kidnapping of Israelis and militants who held Israeli hostages.
- Hezbollah militants fired 10 rockets at Karmiel, and fired additional 30 rocket at other locations in northern Israel, triggering repeated emergency sirens throughout the day.

=== 12 April ===
- The Lebanese health ministry said that at least 35 people were killed in Israeli attacks in Lebanon in the previous 24 hours, increasing its count of the Lebanese death toll since the start of the war to 2,055 including 165 children.
- The IDF said that it killed 20 Hezbollah militants during an operation in a hospital in Bint Jbeil that was allegedly used to store weapons and carry out surveillance and accused the group of using medical facilities and ambulances in Lebanon for military activities.
- A Hezbollah rocket attack in southern Lebanon moderately injured two Israeli soldiers.

=== 13 April ===
- The Lebanese health ministry said that at least 34 people were killed in Israeli attacks in Lebanon in the previous 24 hours, increasing the Lebanese death toll according to their count since the start of the war to 2,089.
- An Israeli woman was lightly injured in a rocket attack by Hezbollah militants in Nahariya.
- An IDF Humvee overturned in southern Lebanon, killing a reservist and injuring three others.

=== 14 April ===
- The Lebanese health ministry said that at least 35 people were killed in Israeli attacks in Lebanon in the previous 24 hours, increasing the Lebanese death toll according to their count since the start of the war to 2,124.
- Ten Israeli soldiers from the 35th Paratroopers Brigade were injured, three seriously, during an overnight battle with Hezbollah militants in Bint Jbeil.
- Israel and Lebanon held direct talks in Washington, D.C. for the first time since 1993, aimed at establishing negotiations between the two countries to end the war.
- The IDF said that three Hezbollah militants surrendered in Bint Jbeil, while the commander of the 401st Brigade's 52nd Battalion was seriously injured in the area.
- The IDF said that a missile launcher that was aimed at Israel was uncovered in Lebanon.
- Hezbollah fired 47 rockets at northern Israel and additional 17 rockets within Lebanon at IDF soldiers.

=== 15 April ===
- The Lebanese health ministry said at least 43 people were killed in Israeli attacks in Lebanon in the previous 24 hours, increasing the Lebanese death toll according to its count since the start of the war to 2,167.
- The IDF said that more than 1,700 Hezbollah militants were killed in Lebanon since the end of February.
- Hezbollah fired more than 40 rockets at Israel, injuring one person in Tamra.
- A Hezbollah rocket strike in southern Lebanon injured five Israeli soldiers, one seriously.

=== 16 April ===
- The Lebanese health ministry said at least 29 people were killed in Israeli attacks in Lebanon in the previous 24 hours, increasing the Lebanese death toll according to its count since the start of the war to 2,196 including 172 children.
- Hezbollah fired a missile at central Israel, which fell in an open area.
- The commander of the IDF's Unit 603 said that his forces destroyed more than 1,000 militant sites in Lebanon, many of which were residential houses that Hezbollah allegedly converted to weapon storage facilities.
- Hezbollah rocket attacks seriously injured two Israelis near Karmiel and injured another Israeli in Nahariya.
- President Trump announced that Israel and Lebanon agreed to a 10-day truce.
- The Israeli military destroyed the Qasmieh Bridge hours before the ceasefire announcement.

=== 17 April ===
- The Lebanese health ministry said that the Lebanese death toll since March 2 increased according to its count to 2,294.
- The Lebanese army alleged Israeli shelling in several villages in south Lebanon in breach of the ceasefire.
- Iran announced that passage of commercial vessels through the Hormuz Strait is completely open during the truce in Lebanon.

=== 18 April ===
- Iran said that it closed the Strait of Hormuz again in response to the US refusing to lift its naval blockade.
- The IDF said that it carried out several strikes on Hezbollah militants whom it accused of violating the ceasefire by approaching its troops in the "Yellow Line" in southern Lebanon over the past day.
- French president Emmanuel Macron said that a French soldier was killed and three others were injured in an attack on UNIFIL peacekeepers apparently conducted by Hezbollah. The group's leadership denied involvement. Macron later announced that another French soldier died from the injuries sustained in the attack.
- The IDF said that one of its reservists was killed and three other soldiers were injured during combat in southern Lebanon.

=== 19 April ===
- The IDF said that one of its soldiers was killed and nine others were injured, one critically during combat in southern Lebanon.

=== 21 April ===
- The IDF said that Hezbollah violated the ceasefire by launching rockets at an Israeli position in Rab Thalathin and a drone into northern Israel. It added that it hit the rocket launcher as a response to one of those incidents. Hezbollah said that it fired rockets and attack drones towards a site in northern Israel that it said was the source of artillery shelling towards a town in south Lebanon in retaliation for what it said were Israeli violations of the truce.

=== 22 April ===
- Gaza health officials said that five people including three children were killed in an Israeli strike in Beit Lahia.
- The Lebanese health ministry said that two people were killed in an Israeli strike on a car in southern Lebanon. Lebanese rescue workers said that one Lebanese female journalist was killed and another journalist was critically injured in a second Israeli strike that hit a house in the same area. The IDF said that individuals had violated the truce, endangering its forces.
- Hezbollah said that it attacked an Israeli position in Al-Bayyada with a drone in retaliation to alleged Israeli violations of the truce. The IDF said that it intercepted the drone. The group added that it launched a drone attack on Israeli troops and a Humvee in al-Qantara in retaliation for Israeli attacks and downed four Israeli reconnaissance drones in southern Lebanon.

=== 23 April ===
- Shafaq reported that two people, including a child were injured due to Israeli artillery fire on Yatar.
- The IDF said that Hezbollah militants launched a guided anti-tank missile near troops in southern Lebanon. It later said that the group launched an explosive-laden drone attack on troops in southern Lebanon, lightly injuring one soldier, and launched several rockets at an IDF position in Aynata.
- Shafaq reported that an Israeli strike on a car in Nabatieh killed three people. The IDF said that it killed three Hezbollah militants who attempted to shoot down an Israeli drone above southern Lebanon.
- Hezbollah militants fired four rockets at Shtula, causing no damage or injuries. The IDF said it retaliated by striking structures used by Hezbollah in southern Lebanon.
- President Trump said that Israel and Lebanon agreed to a three week extension of the ceasefire.

=== 24 April ===
- The Lebanese health ministry said that the Lebanese death toll since the start of the war according to its count increased to 2,491.
- Two people were killed in an Israeli strike in Gaza City. The IDF said it had targeted two militants who threatened its forces in the area. Seven people including four police officers were killed in an Israeli strike on a police vehicle in Khan Yunis. Israeli strikes in northern Gaza killed a pregnant woman and her 4 and 13 year-old children. The IDF said that several militants had threatened its forces in the area and it targeted them with an airstrike after warning civilians.
- The IDF issued evacuation orders for Deir Aames, saying that Hezbollah militants are using the area for military activities.
- The IDF said that it downed a Hezbollah drone prior to entering Israel.
- Lebanese media reported that Hezbollah shot down an Israeli drone over Tyre with an anti-aircraft missile. The IDF later confirmed that Hezbollah shot down one of its UAVs using an anti-aircraft missile.
- The IDF said Hezbollah militants fired explosive-laden drones towards its forces in Al-Qantara and accused the group of violating the truce. The IDF said that it struck surveillance equipment at a Hezbollah rocket-launching site in Kounin, saying that the equipment “posed a direct threat to the forces operating in the area.”
- The IDF released video claiming to show Hezbollah militants using ambulances for military activity.
- The UNIFIL said that a second Indonesian peacekeeper died due to injuries from an apparent Israeli attack.
- The IDF said that it killed six Hezbollah militants during clashes in Bint Jbeil and accused the group of violating the truce.
- Hezbollah said that it hit an Israeli Humvee in Al-Qantara in retaliation for alleged Israeli violations of the ceasefire.
- The IDF said that a canine from the Oketz Unit was killed after revealing the location of a Hezbollah cell in Bint Jbeil, adding that all six militants were killed within an hour and a half of their identification and accused the group of violating the truce.
- The IDF said that Hezbollah militants fired more explosive-laden drones that hit next to its forces in southern Lebanon and accused the group of violating the truce. It added that it attacked several Hezbollah rocket launchers in Yatar and Kafra, which are situated north of the Lebanese areas held by Israelis, saying that they “posed a threat to IDF troops and Israeli civilians".

=== 25 April ===
- A kite suspected of flying in from Gaza into southern Israel was recovered by the IDF.
- The IDF said that it downed a 'suspicious aerial target' in an area in southern Lebanon area where its forces operate.
- An Israeli strike in southern Lebanon killed four people. The IDF said that those killed include three Hezbollah militants. The IDF said that Hezbollah launched two rockets towards Israel. The IDF added it had targeted loaded Hezbollah rocket launchers in three places in southern Lebanon and Radwan Force facilities. It restated its evacuation orders not to approach the Litani River area.
- The IDF said that it hit "Hezbollah infrastructure" in its "buffer zone" in southern Lebanon.
- Prime Minister Benjamin Netanyahu's office said that he ordered the IDF to "vigorously strike" Hezbollah targets in Lebanon.
- Several drones were launched from Lebanon towards northern Israel.

=== 26 April ===
- The Lebanese health ministry said at least 13 people were killed in Israeli attacks in Lebanon in the previous 24 hours, increasing the Lebanese death toll according to its count since the start of the war to 2,509.
- Gaza medics said that an Israeli strike in the vicinity of Al-Mughraqa killed one person, and two others in the vicinity of Gaza City. Apparent Israeli gunfire killed a woman in Khan Yunis. The IDF said it was unaware of the incident in Khan Yunis, adding added that it killed several al-Qassam Brigades militants.
- The IDF ordered restrictions on movement in areas of southern Lebanon, and issued evacuation orders for several south Lebanon villages beyond its control, citing alleged truce violations by Hezbollah militants.
- The IDF announced that it dismantled an al-Qassam Brigades tunnel measuring roughly 800 m (2,600 ft) in southern Gaza, east of the Yellow Line, and said that it found weapons there. It added that the underground route contained living quarters, military equipment, and weapons, including tactical vests and a rocket belonging to al-Quds Brigades.
- The IDF announced that it targeted Hezbollah military structures in overnight strikes throughout southern Lebanon; explosive drones fired at its troops landed in open area.
- The IDF announced that the IAF downed three drones prior to entering northern Israel.
- The IDF announced that one of its soldiers was killed while six others were injured, including an officer and three troops who were critically injured, a soldier who was moderately injured and a soldier who was slightly injured in a Hezbollah drone attack in southern Lebanon.

=== 27 April ===
- The Lebanese health ministry said at least 11 people were killed in Israeli attacks in Lebanon in the previous 24 hours, increasing the Lebanese death toll according to its count since the start of the war to 2,521.
- Hezbollah leader Naim Qassem said that the group will not revert to the pre-March status and will respond to Israeli attacks.
- The IDF said that it lost contact with a drone fired from Lebanon at northern Israel.
- The IDF said it dismantled over 50 Hezbollah infrastructure sites in recent days, including one Hezbollah underground compound, and allegedly recovered an arms storage facility inside a children's room containing explosives, Kalashnikov rifles, grenades, RPGs, machine guns and ammunition and accused Hezbollah militants of exploiting Lebanese civilians for their activities. Separately, the IDF announced it downed a droned fired by Hezbollah militants fired an explosive drone towards its troops operating in southern Lebanon the previous day.
- The IDF said it killed three Hezbollah militants and hit its military structures in the vicinity of the front line in southern Lebanon.
- The IDF said it started conducting strikes against Hezbollah infrastructure in eastern Lebanon, expanding the scope of its bombing campaign during a truce. Security sources told Reuters that attacks hit in the vicinity of Nabi Chit.
- The IDF announced that its troops operating in the Israeli buffer zone in Lebanon were targeted by an "explosive drone" fired by Hezbollah, without causing casualties. Hezbollah said that it had targeted an Israeli tank in southern Lebanon using a drone.
- The IDF announced that it struck over 20 Hezbollah-linked arms manufacturing, storage and rocket firing sites sites throughout the Beqaa Valley and southern Lebanon.

=== 28 April ===
- The Lebanese health ministry said at least 13 people were killed in Israeli attacks in Lebanon in the previous 24 hours, increasing the Lebanese death toll according to its count since the start of the war to 2,534.
- Gaza Strip health officials said that a 9-year-old boy was killed in an Israeli strike in eastern Khan Yunis. The IDF said it had targeted a person who posed a threat to its forces by approaching the “yellow line”. Gaza medics also said that four people were killed in an Israeli strike on a vehicle in Gaza City. The IDF said the strike targeted what it said was a militant.

=== 29 April ===
- The Lebanese health ministry said at least 42 people were killed in Israeli attacks in Lebanon in the previous 24 hours, increasing the Lebanese death toll according to its count since the start of the war to 2,576.
- The Lebanese Army announced that a Lebanese ‌soldier and his ‌brother were killed in an Israeli attack ‌in Bint ‌Jbeil.

=== 30 April ===
- At least three people were killed in an Israeli strike in the vicinity of Salahudeen road in central Gaza. One person was killed in another Israeli strike in the vicinity of a hospital in Deir Al-Balah.
- After a Hezbollah drone intrusion in Moshav Shomera, a car caught fire.
- The IDF said that Hezbollah shot down one of its drone with its missile in southern Lebanon. It added that its troops killed five Hezbollah militants who were operating near its forces on the previous day.
- The IDF announced that it killed an al-Qassam Brigades militant in Gaza whom it accused of planning to conduct an imminent attack the previous day.
- The IDF issued evacuation orders for eight villages outside its "buffer zone" in southern Lebanon, citing "Hezbollah infrastructure". The IDF then said that it destroyed missile firing positions used by the group.
- Two IDF soldiers were moderately injured, 10 slightly in a Hezbollah drone strike in Moshav Shomera.
- Two incendiary kites were reported by Israeli communities in the Gaza-border including Kissufim and Nahal Oz. The IDF announced that no dangerous devices were found attached to them.
- The IDF issued evacuation orders for residents of 15 villages in the Nabatieh area, citing alleged Hezbollah militant activities. The IDF later announced that it carried out strikes on Hezbollah infrastructure.
- The IDF announced that one of its soldiers was killed and another soldier was moderately injured in a drone strike in southern Lebanon.
- The Trump administration's Board of Peace accused Hamas of theft of aid, saying that it reduced from 90% to less than 1% due to its efforts since the truce in Gaza.
- The IDF announced that one of its officers and one of its noncommissioned officers were moderately injured after an explosive drone detonated in southern Lebanon.

== May 2026 ==
=== 4 May ===
- The Lebanese health ministry said at least 17 people were killed in Israeli attacks in Lebanon in the previous 24 hours, increasing the Lebanese death toll according to its count since the start of the war to 2,696.
- The IDF said it downed a drone in the vicinity of the Israel-Lebanon border.
- The IDF ordered to evacuate four residential areas in Tyre district, citing alleged truce violations by Hezbollah militants. It later said that it carried out strikes on Hezbollah infrastructure.
- The IDF said that it killed 10 armed Hezbollah militants in the last two days in several areas in the vicinity of its troops in southern Lebanon, adding that its multi-dimensional unit dismantled a loaded launch position and infrastructure used to store weapons, while the IAF also conducted strikes on Hezbollah infrastructure overnight after anti-tank fire was launched at its forces, without causing casualties.
- The IDF said that two soldiers from the Golani reconnaissance brigade were moderately injured during a clash with Hezbollah militants in southern Lebanon.
- The IDF ordered to evacuate six south Lebanon villages, citing alleged truce violations by Hezbollah militants.

=== 6 May ===
- Two people, including a son of Hamas leader Khalil Al-Hayya, were killed in an Israeli strike in Gaza City.
- An Israeli strike hit a vehicle in Al-Mawasi, killing a Gaza Police colonel and injuring at least 17 others.
- At least three people were killed in another Israeli strike in Gaza.
- The IDF said that it killed over 220 Hezbollah militants since 16 April.
- An Israeli strike was reported in Ghobeiry. The IDF said that it killed Ahmed Ghaleb Balout, the commander of the Radwan Force.
- Four people were killed in an Israeli strike in the Beqaa Valley.
- The IDF said it carried out strikes on Hezbollah targets in southern Lebanon, after ordering residents of 12 towns to evacuate.
- Hezbollah said that it a carried out several operations against Israeli forces in southern Lebanon, as well as attacks on northern Israel.
- NNA reported that an Israeli strike hit a home in Ain Baal.
- Three Israeli strikes were reported in Dibbin.
- Lebanese media reported that Israeli fighter jets conducted three attacks in Nabatieh.
- At least 13 people were killed in Israeli strikes in southern and eastern Lebanon.

=== 7 May ===
- Three Hamas-affiliated security forces were killed in an Israeli strike on a guard post. Gaza Interior Ministry said that a fourth security officer was seriously injured in the strike. The IDF said it carried out the strike on a Hamas command center.
- An Israeli soldier was caught desecrating a statue of the Virgin Mary in the Lebanese town of Debel by placing a cigarette in the statue's mouth. The IDF said it will take action when he is identified.
- Four Israeli soldiers were injured by an explosion in southern Lebanon.
- The IDF said that it killed over 85 Hezbollah militants and carried out strikes on 180 sites used by the group in the past week.

=== 8 May ===
- The Lebanese health ministry said at least 32 people were killed in Israeli attacks in Lebanon in the previous 24 hours, increasing the Lebanese death toll according to its count since the start of the war to 2,759.

=== 9 May ===
- The Lebanese health ministry said at least 39 people were killed in Israeli attacks in Lebanon in the previous 24 hours.

=== 10 May ===
- The Lebanese health ministry said at least 87 people were killed in Israeli attacks in Lebanon in the previous 48 hours, increasing the Lebanese death toll since the start of the war according to its count to 2,846.

=== 11 May ===
- The Lebanese health ministry said at least 23 people were killed in Israeli attacks in Lebanon in the previous 24 hours, increasing the Lebanese death toll since the start of the war to 2,869.

=== 12 May ===
- NNA reported that a Syrian man was killed and his wife was injured after an Israeli strike hit a motorcycle in Tyre's Hamadieh area.

=== 13 May ===
- The Lebanese health ministry said that Lebanese death toll since the start of the war increased to 2,896 including over 200 children.

=== 15 May ===
- Israeli strikes hit an apartment and a vehicle in Rimal area of Gaza City, killing seven people including three women and a child and wounding at least 50 others. Israeli forces said that they targeted Hamas leader in the Gaza Strip Izz al-Din al-Haddad, whose death was confirmed by Hamas the next day.
- The IDF reported that a soldier of the Golani Brigade's 12th Battalion was killed when Hezbollah militants launched a mortar at his unit during combat in southern Lebanon.
- The truce was extended by Israel and Lebanon for another 45 days.

=== 18 May ===
- The Lebanese health ministry said that Lebanese death toll since the start of the war increased to 3,020.

=== 19 May ===
- The Lebanese health ministry reported that 22 people were killed in Israeli attacks in the previous 24 hours, increasing the Lebanese death toll to 3,042.
- The IDF announced that a major was killed during combat in southern Lebanon, increasing the IDF death toll in southern Lebanon to 21.

=== 20 May ===
- The Lebanese health ministry reported that 31 people were killed in Israeli attacks in the previous 24 hours, increasing the Lebanese death toll to 3,073.
- Hezbollah reported that fighting between the group and an Israeli force consisting of tanks and infantry occurred in the vicinity of Haddatha.
- The IDF announced that a brigade commander was critically injured and a lieutenant colonel was slightly to moderately injured during combat due to a Hezbollah drone attack in southern Lebanon.

=== 21 May ===
- An IDF combat photographer was critically injured and six other soldiers were injured, three of them moderately and three others slightly in a Hezbollah drone attack during combat in southern Lebanon, increasing number of soldiers critically injured from its Operational Documentation Division since the start of the Gaza war to two.

=== 22 May ===
- The Lebanese health ministry reported that the death toll from Israeli attacks in Lebanon had risen to 3,111.

=== 23 May ===
- The IDF ordered to evacuate an area of Tyre. It later struck two structures in and around the city.
- The IDF announced that a soldier was killed, while two others were injured, one critically and one slightly by a Hezbollah drone in northern Israel near the border, increasing the IDF death toll since the start of the war in Lebanon to 22. Hezbollah later published a video of a night time drone strike on the soldiers in Iskandarounah.
- The Alma center reported that the Al-Risala Association showed rescue operations in a multi-barrel rocket launcher that was struck by Israel.

=== 24 May ===
- The Lebanese health ministry reported that the death toll from Israeli attacks in Lebanon had risen according to its count to 3,123.

=== 25 May ===
- A six-year-old girl and a woman were killed and another girl was injured in an Israeli strike that hit a tent in al-Mawasi. Israeli forces said that they targeted a militant.
- The IDF reported that a sergeant of the Israeli Combat Engineering Corps was killed and another soldier was critically injured by a Hezbollah FPV drone in southern Lebanon, increasing the number of IDF personnel killed in Lebanon to 23.

=== 26 May ===
- An Israeli strike hit people who came out of their houses when a Palestinian militia backed by Israel attempted to storm an area east of Maghazi camp, killing at least five people and injuring several others. Two people were killed and several others were injured in an Israeli strike on a vehicle in Khan Yunis. The IDF said that it was a "targeted strike".
- An Israeli strike hit a building in Rimal area of Gaza City, killing three people including a woman and injuring over 20 others. Prime Minister Netanyahu announced that it targeted Mohammed Odeh, the Hamas leader in the Gaza Strip. The next day, Gaza media outlets connected to Hamas said that he was killed alongside his wife and children. Hamas later confirmed his death.

=== 27 May ===
- 10 people including an al-Qassam Brigades militant, five children and an elderly person were killed and over 20 others were wounded in separate Israeli strikes in Gaza. The IDF said that its strikes in northern Gaza targeted two al-Qassam Brigades militants.
- The IDF said that a projectile fired from Lebanon landed in an open area in Israel after sirens sounded in several areas in the north, but no casualties were reported.
- The IDF reported that a female soldier of the Givati Brigade was killed and two reservists were injured, one critically and another moderately in a Hezbollah drone attack on a military position on the Israeli border, increasing the IDF death toll to 24.

=== 28 May ===
- Prime Minister Netanyahu declared that he ordered Israeli forces to take control of more of Gaza's territory, first by seizing 70%.
- The IDF said it struck Hezbollah militants that intended to blow up Lebanon's strategic national dam.

=== 29 May ===
- The Lebanese health ministry reported that 142 people were killed in Israeli attacks in the past 72 hours, increasing the death toll in Lebanon according to its count to 3,355.
- Prime Minister Netanyahu announced that Israeli forces had crossed the Litani river and were operating in Beirut and the Bekaa Valley, in what he characterised as a “tactical victory”.
- Israeli forces announced that they killed an al-Qassam Brigades' deputy commander, Imad Hassan Hussein Aslim, who was involved in the 7 October attacks.

=== 30 May ===
- The Lebanese health ministry reported that at least 16 people were killed in Israeli attacks in the previous 24 hours, increasing the Lebanese death toll according to its count to 3,371.
- Hezbollah fired several rockets towards northern Israel including a barrage at Nahariya for the first time in three weeks, causing panic to people including children on a beach in the city. One rocket reached Karmiel, marking the furthest fire into Israel since the roughly month long ceasefire. Another barrage caused damage in Kiryat Shmona. The IDF said that it downed a "launch" which entered into northern Israel from Lebanon.

=== 31 May ===
- An Israeli strike hit a cafe on the emergency seaport in Gaza City, killing two people and injuring 12 others.
- The IDF announced that a sergeant of the Givati Brigade was killed and four other soldiers were slightly injured after a Hezbollah drone attack on an IDF post in southern Lebanon, increasing the IDF death toll to 26.
- The IDF seized Beaufort Castle.

== June 2026 ==
=== 1 June ===
- The IDF said that one of its sergeants was killed, one of its soldiers was critically injured and two of its soldiers were slightly injured in a Hezbollah drone attack in southern Lebanon.
- The IDF said that one of its medical officers was killed while seven soldiers were injured by a Hezbollah drone during combat in southern Lebanon.
- Israel agreed not to hit Beirut's southern suburbs, and Hezbollah agreed not to attack Israel as part of a US proposal, with the cease-fire framework to be expanded to include entire Lebanon.
- The IDF detected rocket launches towards the Galilee, the Golan, and IDF positions in Lebanon after President Trump announced the truce. Several Israeli strikes were also reported in Lebanon during the same time.

=== 2 June ===
- Gaza medics said that at least four people were killed in Israeli strikes in Gaza.
- The Lebanese health ministry reported that at least 35 people were killed in Israeli attacks in the previous 24 hours, increasing the Lebanese death toll according to its count to 3,468.
- A prosecutor's declaration revealed that a Hamas militant who held for a decade the body of IDF hostage soldier Oron Shaul, was arrested by Israel 18 months ago, and provided the details for the extraction of the body.

=== 3 June ===
- The Lebanese health ministry reported that at least 48 people were killed in Israeli attacks in the previous 24 hours, increasing the Lebanese death toll according to its count to 3,516.
- Israel and Lebanon agreed to renew a ceasefire, mediated by the US, and plan to establish "pilot zones".
- An Israeli strike in the vicinity of Mughraqa area in central Gaza killed one person. The IDF said they struck an individual acting suspiciously in the vicinity of its forces operating in an area under its control. Another Israeli strike in the courtyard of a home in the nearby Maghazi refugee camp killed two people.

=== 4 June ===
- The Lebanese health ministry reported that at least 10 people were killed in Israeli attacks in the previous 24 hours, increasing the Lebanese death toll according to its count to 3,526.
- At least 10 people including two children and two women were killed in at least four separate Israeli strikes in Gaza City. Israeli forces said that those killed in the strikes include four senior Hamas militants that were members of an apparatus that provided intelligence assessments to Hamas leaders.
- The IDF said that a Hezbollah attack hit IDF Northern Command chief Rafi Milo's car after he stepped out of the vehicle in southern Lebanon apparently sometime in the past several weeks, no casualties were reported.
- A Serbian peacekeeper was killed while two others were injured in a strike on a UNIFIL base in southern Lebanon.
- Hezbollah rejected the truce deal announced the previous day and instead demanded a comprehensive truce and full withdrawal of Israel from Lebanon.
- The IDF said one of its soldiers was killed when a Hezbollah militant launched an anti-tank missile on a tank north of the Litani River.

=== 6 June ===
- The Lebanese Health Ministry announced that the Lebanese death toll as a result of Israeli attacks had risen according to its count to 3,593.
- An Israeli strike hit a large tent encampment in the heart of Gaza City, killing seven people including two women and injuring 15 others including children. An IDF spokesperson said the strike targeted militants.
- Three Lebanese soldiers were killed in an IDF attack on their car near Kfar Tebnit. The IDF said that the car was "moving suspiciously towards forces" and gunfire was reported in the area.
- The IDF said that two of its soldiers were killed in combat in southern Lebanon.

=== 7 June ===
- Gaza health officials said that Israeli strikes hit a Gaza police station and a vehicle in Gaza, killing at least nine people and injuring 20 others. The IDF said that one of those strikes targeted Hamas infrastructure.
- The Lebanese Health Ministry reported that at least 20 people were killed in Israeli attacks in the previous 24 hours, increasing the Lebanese death toll according to its count to 3,613.
- The IDF announced that it downed two projectiles which entered from Lebanon.
- Lebanese state media said that an Israeli strike in the southern suburbs of Beirut killed two people and wounded 11 others. The IDF said that it targeted Hezbollah infrastructure after the group fired towards northern Israel.

=== 8 June ===
- Six people including a child were killed in an Israeli strike that hit a tent in Mawasi.

=== 9 June ===
- The Lebanese Health Ministry reported that the death toll from Israeli attacks in Lebanon had risen according to its count to 3,666.
- A militant of unclear affiliation was killed after crossing into northern Israel from Lebanon and firing at IDF soldiers, causing no injuries.
- Israeli airstrikes in Tyre killed eight people and injured 32 others after the IDF issued an evacuation order due to alleged presence of Hezbollah militants in the entire city, including its Christian quarter for the first time.

=== 10 June ===
- The Lebanese Health Ministry reported that at least 30 people were killed in Israeli attacks in the previous 24 hours, increasing the Lebanese death toll according to its count to 3,696.
- Lebanese media said thay Israeli strikes killed 17 people in southern Lebanon, including nine in Tayr Debba, three in Deir Qanoun an-Naher, two in Seddiqin, and one in Tyre. NNA said that a strike that hit a car in central Sidon killed two others.

=== 11 June ===
- An Israeli strike hit a home in Gaza City's Moghrabi Street, killing one person. Separate Israeli strikes in the Nuseirat refugee camp killed two people.
- The Lebanese Health Ministry reported that at least 15 people were killed in Israeli attacks in the previous 24 hours, increasing the Lebanese death toll according to its count to 3,711.

=== 12 June ===
- The IDF said that it killed over 10 Hezbollah militants who served as field commanders and their successors in its strikes in southern Lebanon.

=== 13 June ===
- The Lebanese Health Ministry raised its count of Lebanese deaths since 2 March to 3,756.

=== 14 June ===
- Six people were killed in Israeli strikes and gunfire in Gaza.
- An AP photographer said that an Israeli strike hit a five-story apartment building in the southern suburbs of Beirut, while Lebanese civil defense said it retrieved three bodies and six injured people from the scene. Israel said that it launched strikes against Hezbollah targets in response to attacks on the country.
- Israel announced that in a strike in southern Lebanon over the weekend it killed Ali Musa Daqduq, a senior Hezbollah commander responsible for the Karbala provincial headquarters raid that killed five American soldiers during the Iraq War.

=== 15 June ===
- Gaza health officials said that at least four people including a woman and a medic were killed in Israeli strikes in Gaza. Israel said that it killed two al-Qassam Brigades militants who were plotting attacks against its forces.
- Pakistan, the primary mediator, stated that both the United States and Iran declared the "immediate and permanent termination of military operations on all fronts, including in Lebanon" as part of the agreement to end the 2026 Iran war. Israel stated that its forces will remain in Lebanon.
- Hezbollah said that it has not conducted any operations since the announcement of the agreement.

=== 16 June ===
- The Gaza Health Ministry said that the bodies of five people killed due to Israeli attacks arrived in hospitals throughout Gaza in the past 24 hours, increasing its count of Palestinian death toll in Gaza to 73,008.
- At least two people were killed in an Israeli strike in the vicinity of a residential building in the Nuseirat refugee camp.
- The Lebanese Health Ministry reported that at least 15 people were killed in Israeli attacks in the previous 24 hours, increasing the Lebanese death toll according to its count to 3,798.

=== 17 June ===
- The Lebanese Health Ministry reported that at least 28 people were killed in Israeli attacks in the previous 24 hours, increasing the Lebanese death toll according to its count to 3,826.
- The IDF said that Hezbollah drone attacks in southern Lebanon injured five soldiers, one seriously.
- The IDF reported killing two al-Qassam Brigades militants in Gaza, accusing them of transferring more than half a billion NIS for salaries for al-Qassam Brigades militants and financing attacks against Israeli civilians and soldiers and violating the ceasefire agreement.
- A Hezbollah IED explosion killed an IDF soldier and injured seven others near the Litani River.

=== 18 June ===
- Three people were killed in an Israeli strike on a vehicle in Gaza City's main Omar Al-Mokhtar road. The IDF said that it targeted al-Qassam Brigades militants.
- The Lebanese Health Ministry reported that at least 58 people were killed in Israeli attacks in the previous 24 hours, increasing the Lebanese death toll according to its count to 3,884.

=== 19 June ===
- The Lebanese Health Ministry reported that at least 28 people were killed in Israeli attacks in the previous 24 hours, increasing the Lebanese death toll according to its count to 3,912.
- The IDF reported that four soldiers of the 401st Brigade, including a Lieutenant-Colonel, were killed after Hezbollah targeted their tank with an explosive drone in the Lebanese village of Kfar Tebnit, increasing the IDF death toll to 36. The IDF said that in response it struck 80 Hezbollah sites in southern Lebanon and the Beqaa Valley, killing dozens of militants.
- A Hezbollah drone strike in Kfar Tebnit injured five IDF soldiers, one seriously.
- President Trump announced a renewed ceasefire between Israel and Hezbollah.

=== 20 June ===
- The Lebanese Health Ministry reported that at least 83 people were killed in Israeli attacks in the previous 24 hours, increasing the Lebanese death toll according to its count to 4,057.
- The IDF said that Hezbollah violated the ceasefire by attacking its forces in Lebanon using 50 rockets. Hezbollah said that it attacked Israeli forces who tried to seize Ali al-Taher, Nabatieh. The IDF said that in response it struck dozens of Hezbollah targets. Lebanon’s Civil Defense said that 30 people were killed including civilians and several others were injured including civilians.
- The IDF announced that a soldier of the Maglan Unit was killed and 13 others were injured in an overnight Hezbollah drone attack near Kfar Tebnit, increasing the IDF death toll to 37.

=== 21 June ===
- The Lebanese Health Ministry reported that at least 49 people were killed in Israeli attacks in the previous 24 hours, increasing the Lebanese death toll according to its count to 4,106 including 251 children.

=== 22 June ===
- A 16-year-old girl was killed in an Israeli strike in a street in Gaza City's Rimal neighborhood while on her way to school. Israel said that the strike targeted an al-Qassam Brigades militant, but that it was aware of reports that an "uninvolved individual was harmed." Israeli strikes in the same area also wounded three other people.

=== 23 June ===
- The Lebanese Health Ministry reported that at least 17 people were killed in Israeli attacks in the previous 24 hours, increasing the Lebanese death toll according to its count to 4,192.

=== 24 June ===
- An Israeli Bedouin civilian contractor for the Defense Ministry was killed in a building collapse while conducting demolition work in Gaza.
- An Israeli Druze soldier of the 7th Armoured Brigade was killed and another soldier was wounded in an 'operational incident' in southern Lebanon.

=== 25 June ===
- The Lebanese Health Ministry reported that at least 19 people were killed in Israeli attacks in the previous 24 hours, increasing the Lebanese death toll according to its count to 4,230.
- Four Israeli soldiers were wounded by a grenade during a shootout with a Hezbollah militant in Beit Yahoun. The militant was killed after soldiers returned fire. The IDF added that six Hezbollah militants who "posed a threat" were killed in southern Lebanon.

=== 26 June ===
- The Lebanese Health Ministry reported that at least 13 people were killed in Israeli attacks in the previous 24 hours, increasing the Lebanese death toll according to its count to 4,243.
- Anti-Hamas protests erupted in Gaza City and other regions of northern Gaza. Armed Hamas operatives were deployed to quell them.
- US Secretary of State Marco Rubio announced a framework deal between Israel and Lebanon that aims to achieve "lasting peace and security" through US mediation. The agreement asks for a cease-fire, with Hezbollah agreeing to terminate all hostilities and withdraw from southern Lebanon. It was later rejected by Hezbollah.

=== 27 June ===
- NNA reported an Israeli strike in the Nabatieh region.

=== 28 June ===
- The Lebanese Health Ministry increased the Lebanese death toll according to its count to 4,246.
- At least four people including a 13-year-old girl were killed in Israeli strikes in Gaza. The IDF said that one of those strikes targeted an al-Qassam Brigades militant.
- The IDF announced that it killed several Hezbollah militants armed with RPGs in the vicinity of the IDF’s buffer zone in Nabatieh district. It also said it hit a rocket launcher in the area that posed a threat to its forces.
- The IDF announced that it killed a Nukhba forces militant who participated in the 7 October attacks and seized an IDF vehicle that he took to Gaza. It also said that it killed al-Qassam Brigades' tunnel unit head in Khan Yunis following a strike.
- The IDF announced that one of its soldiers was killed and another soldier was slightly injured in southern Lebanon the previous day.
- The IDF, the Israel Police and the Shin Bet announced that they detained an Al-Aqsa Martyrs' Brigades operative suspected of planning a terrorist attack from the Balata refugee camp.
- Prime Minister Benjamin Netanyahu and Defense Minister Israel Katz announced that the IDF dismantled Hezbollah's subterranean infrastructure in the Majdal Zone and informed the Trump administration in advance. They added that it was over 200 meters long and over 25 meters deep, contained hundreds of weapons and several firing shafts allegedly intended to attack Israel.

=== 29 June ===
- The Gaza Health Ministry said that the bodies of four people killed due to Israeli attacks arrived in hospitals throughout Gaza in the past 24 hours, increasing its count of Palestinian death toll in Gaza to 73,058.
- The Lebanese Health Ministry reported that at least 11 people were killed in Israeli attacks in the previous 24 hours, increasing the Lebanese death toll according to its count to 4,257.
- Gaza medics said that three people including an 8-year-old child were killed and seven people were injured in an Israeli strike that hit a tent in a Deir al-Balah. The IDF said that it targeted a militant in that strike. It added that one of its strikes in southern Gaza the day before killed an al-Quds Brigades militant who took part in the 7 October attacks and abducted Israeli civilians during the attack.
- The IDF announced strikes targeting militants, including three in that weekend. 12 people including four children were killed.
- The IDF and Shin Bet announced that they killed a senior militant within al-Qassam Brigades' apparatus in the Rafah Brigade whom it accused of advancing activities intended to harm its forces in Gaza in a strike in southern Gaza the previous week.
- The IDF announced that it hit three Hezbollah command centers in Nabatieh and Mayfadoun the day before in retaliation to Hezbollah's alleged violations of the truce deal by attacking IDF forces operating in the latter’s buffer zone in Lebanon.
- The IDF announced that one of its reservists was critically injured in a blast in the Beaufort Castle area.
- NNA reported that Israeli fighter jets conducted bombings on the area between Qantara and Deir Seryan.
- The IDF signed a $7 million contract for AI-powered radar to thwart Hezbollah drones.

=== 30 June ===
- The Gaza Health Ministry said that eight people were killed due to Israeli attacks in Gaza in the past 24 hours, increasing its count of Palestinian death toll in Gaza to 73,066.
- The Lebanese Health Ministry reported that at least 21 people were killed in Israeli attacks in the previous 24 hours, increasing the Lebanese death toll according to its count to 4,278.
- Israel announced that it improved the Iron Dome air defence system to better counter threats.
- The IDF announced that it killed an al-Quds Brigades platoon commander who was involved in the 7 October attacks in a strike in Gaza the day before, adding that it took measures "to mitigate harm to civilians". A released hostage said that he was tortured under this militant's command.
- The IDF and Shin Bet announced that they killed an al-Qassam Brigades militant who was the commander of Rafah Brigade's Yibna Battalion, and directed weapons smuggling into Gaza, adding that "steps were taken to mitigate harm to civilians."
- Iran said that Iran, the US, and Lebanon have agreed to form a committee to oversee the end of the war in Lebanon.
- The IDF announced that it killed a Hezbollah militant who posed a threat to its forces in Manzala, in the vicinity of Nabatieh.

== July 2026 ==
=== 1 July ===
- The IDF and Shin Bet announced that they killed an al-Qassam Brigades platoon commander whom it accused of violating the ceasefire in a southern Gaza strike.
- The Lebanese Health Ministry reported that at least 19 people were killed in Israeli attacks in the previous 24 hours, increasing the Lebanese death toll according to its count to 4,297.

=== 2 July ===
- Hamas announced that it executed a person in Gaza whom it accused of collaborating with Israel and assisting in the assassination of several senior Hamas leaders, including former Hamas leader in the Gaza Strip Izz al-Din Haddad.

=== 3 July ===
- The IDF announced that one of its reservists was critically injured due to a "close-quarters encounter in southern Lebanon" the day before.
- The IDF announced that it killed a Nukhba forces militant who participated in the 7 October attacks and was responsible for the kidnapping of four Israeli hostages including an Arab-Israeli and holding them in Hamas captivity in a strike in northern Gaza.
- The IDF announced that it hit roughly 10 Hezbollah infrastructure sites and a truck in southern Lebanon in retaliation to the group's alleged ceasefire breaches.

=== 4 July ===
- The Lebanese Health Ministry increased the Lebanese death toll due to Israeli attacks according to its count to 4,303.

=== 5 July ===
- Gaza health officials said that at least two people were killed and several others were injured in an Israeli strike that hit a group of individuals at the Omar Al-Mokhtar road in central Gaza City.

=== 6 July ===
- Hamas announced the resignation of its civil administration under the Gaza peace plan.
- Gaza medics said that five people were killed in Israeli strikes in Gaza. The IDF said that it targeted an al-Qassam Brigades militant and an al-Quds Brigades militant in those strikes.
- The Lebanese Health Ministry increased the Lebanese death toll due to Israeli attacks since 2 March according to its count to 4,319.
- Lebanese Health Ministry reported that an Israeli strike hit a vehicle in Nabatieh al Fawqa, killing four people including at least two women.
- The IDF announced that it targeted four suspects who approached its security zone in southern Lebanon.

=== 8 July ===
- The Gaza Health Ministry increased its count of Palestinian death toll due to Israeli attacks in Gaza to 73,110.
- Gaza health officials said that nine people including two children were killed in Israeli strikes in Gaza. The IDF said that one of those strikes was aimed at militants.
- The IDF announced that it killed a Hezbollah militant at a building in the vicinity of Bint Jbeil in the IDF buffer zone in southern Lebanon.
- The IDF announced that it killed in a southern Gaza strike a Nukhba Force militant who was involved in the 7 October attacks and accused him of violating the ceasefire, adding that it took measures "to mitigate harm to civilians."

=== 9 July ===
- Gaza civil defense said that six people were killed in Israeli strikes in Gaza. One of those strikes targeted a Hamas spokesperson, but killed his bodyguard instead.
- The Lebanese Health Ministry increased the Lebanese death toll due to Israeli attacks since 2 March according to its count to 4,321.
- The IDF announced that it and Shin Bet killed in a strike in Khan Yunis an al-Qassam Brigades militant who was involved in the 7 October attacks, abducted Israelis and helped keep them hostage in Gaza.
- The IDF announced that it killed an al-Quds Brigades production head "responsible for efforts to manufacture weapons that were intended for use against IDF troops and Israeli civilians" in a southern Gaza strike. It added that it killed an al-Qassam Brigades sniper in a northern Gaza strike.
- The IDF announced that it destroyed two tunnels with a combined length of roughly 200 m (660 ft) in Majdal Zoun and seized "dozens" of armaments.

=== 10 July ===
- Witnesses and the local truckers' organization said that an IDF soldier in Rafah killed a Palestinian truck driver bringing food aid from the World Central Kitchen into Gaza. The IDF confirmed the shooting saying that it opened fire "after perceiving an immediate threat".
- The IDF announced that it killed in a southern Gaza strike, a commander of a Nukhba forces cell that infiltrated the Re'im Army Base in southern Israel during the 7 October attacks and accused him of violating the ceasefire.

=== 12 July ===
- The Gaza Health Ministry increased its count of Palestinian death toll due to Israeli attacks in Gaza to 73,221.
- A 9-year-old girl was killed when gunfire was directed at a tent encampment on Bureij refugee camp's eastern side. The IDF said that it was not aware of the gunfire. Four people were killed and 14 others were injured in Israeli strikes on a metal foundry in Sabra neighborhood of Gaza City. The IDF said that it had struck al-Qassam Brigades militants operating inside an armaments manufacturing site twice, in breach of the truce by the Brigades. At least one person was killed and several others were injured including children in an Israeli strike that hit a tent encampment in al-Mawasi. The IDF said that it conducted a strike in that area, but was unaware of casualties.
- The IDF declared that it killed two al-Qassam Brigades militants in two separate Gaza strikes.

=== 13 July ===
- The IDF published a visual of what it described as hidden Hezbollah tunnels beneath Beaufort Castle, where it said the group's command centres were situated.
- The UN accused the al-Qassam Brigades militants of obstructing Gaza humanitarian deliveries, which the latter denied.

=== 14 July ===
- Medics and police officials and the Hamas-led interior ministry stated that a 10-year-old boy was killed in Rafah, and at least seven people, including woman and a senior Hamas policeman were killed and several other Hamas police officers were injured in an Israeli strike that hit a Hamas-led police force post in Jabalia. Gaza medics said that one person was killed and three others were injured in an Israeli strike in Khan Yunis. The IDF stated that it targeted an al-Qassam Brigades militant.
- The IDF announced that it killed a commander of an al-Qassam Brigades' Naval Array cell and killed three other militants who posed an immediate threat to its forces in a Gaza City strike.
- The IDF announced that it killed al-Qassam Brigades' central Jabaliya battalion military security chief in a northern Gaza strike. It also stated that it killed a Nukhba militant in Hamas' central Jabaliya battalion who also served as Hamas police investigations department head, another militant in the same battalion and a militant in the western Jabaliya battalion who also worked in the Hamas police force.

=== 15 July ===
- Gaza health officials said that three people including a woman and a 6-year-old girl were killed and one person was wounded in an Israeli strike that hit an apartment building in Deir Al-Balah. The IDF said that it aimed at an al-Qassam Brigades militant. Gaza medics said that one person was killed in another strike in Gaza City's Sheikh Radwan neighbourhood.
- The IDF announced that it killed a Nukhba forces company deputy commander and the chief of Nukhba cell in al-Qassam Brigades' Sabra Battalion in a northern Gaza strike.
- The IDF announced that it killed in a strike a militant from al-Qassam Brigades' Eastern Khan Yunis Battalion who was involved in the 7 October attacks and took three IDF soldiers as hostages.

=== 16 July ===
- Gaza health ‌officials said that five people were killed in Israeli strikes in Gaza.
- Syria stated that it thwarted an attempt to transfer armaments to Hezbollah through Iraq.
- The IDF said it hit four al-Qassam Brigades arms depots in Gaza overnight.

=== 17 July ===
- Gaza health officials said that at least eight people were killed and more than 20 others injured in an Israeli strike in Nuseirat refugee camp when they attended a funeral of a person killed in prior Israeli strike strike that killed two people and the IDF said that it targeted an al-Qassam Brigades militant in that strike. The IDF stated that it aimed at an al-Quds Brigades militant cell and aware of claims for harm to civilians. Three more people including two women were killed in apparent Israeli strikes in northern Gaza, Gaza City and Khan Yunis. The IDF issued evacuation order for an area east of Deir al-Balah.
- The IDF stated that it killed an al-Qassam Brigades commander who took part in holding Israeli hostages and also served as its Khan Younis Brigade propaganda activities leader and as the Brigade leader Mohammed Deif's senior aide.

=== 18 July ===
- At least five people including three children aged between 8 and 18 were killed and six others were injured including four children of 8 to 16 years of age in an Israeli strike that hit an apartment in Nasr neighborhood of Gaza City. The IDF said it targeted al-Qassam Brigades infrastructure and had spotted al-Qassam Brigades militants in the location. Four people were killed and another person was seriously injured in an Israeli strike on a group of individuals in Gaza City's Zeitoun neighborhood. The IDF said it targeted an al-Qassam Brigades militant.
- The IDF stated that it hit a Hezbollah cell in the vicinity of Tebnit after it identified a Hezbollah UAV, accusing Hezbollah of breaching truce understandings.
- The IDF stated that an al-Quds Brigades sniper and a commander in al-Qassam Brigades' operations headquarters accused of violating the ceasefire were killed in strikes in central and north Gaza.

=== 20 July ===
- The Lebanese Health Ministry increased the Lebanese death toll due to Israeli attacks since 2 March according to its count to 4,328.
- Hamas announced that it elected Khalil al-Hayya as its overall leader.
- NNA reported a large-scale Israeli attack in Kfar Tebnit.
- The US announced that Israel handed over sections of its buffer zone in southern Lebanon to the Lebanese government as part of the 2026 Israel–Lebanon ceasefire.

=== 21 July ===
- Six members of a family including a woman, three girls and one boy were killed in Israeli strike that hit a residential building in Sabra neighbourhood of Gaza City. The IDF stated that it targeted an al-Qassam Brigades militant.
- At least six people were killed and others were injured in Israeli strikes on a vehicle in central Gaza and an association in Gaza City.
- Lebanon announced that the Lebanese Army started deploying in Zawtar al-Gharbiyah following Israeli withdrawal from the town in accordance with the 2026 Israel–Lebanon ceasefire.
- The IDF announced that it and Shin Bet killed an al-Qassam Brigades militant who served as its Gaza City Brigade operations head during the 7 October attacks and held numerous hostages including women following a Gaza City strike.
- The IDF announced that it killed an al-Qassam Brigades cell commander who took hostages during the 7 October attacks.
- The Lebanese army accused the IDF of opening fire towards its forces in a "pilot zone". The IDF stated that it fired "warning shots" after they crossed roughly 150 m (490 ft) into territory it occupied.

=== 22 July ===
- The Gaza Health Ministry increased its count of the Palestinian death toll due to Israeli attacks in Gaza to 73,305.

=== 23 July ===
- Two people were killed in an Israeli strike in northern Gaza. The IDF stated that it targeted militants.

=== 24 July ===
- The Lebanese Health Ministry increased the Lebanese death toll due to Israeli attacks since 2 March according to its count to 4,330.

=== 25 July ===
- The Gaza Health Ministry increased its count of the Palestinian death toll due to Israeli attacks in Gaza to 73,317.
- An Israeli strike in Khan Yunis killed a high school student. Hamas-led police force chief, Abdel-Nasser Al-Maqadma, was killed in an Israeli strike in Gaza City's Sheikh Radwan neighborhood. The IDF stated that he was also a militant from al-Qassam Brigades. Another apparent Israeli strike in Nuseirat refugee camp killed a medic. Two people were killed in an Israeli strike that hit a house in Khan Yunis. The IDF announced that it targeted an al-Quds Brigades militant. Another police officer injured in an Israeli strike the previous week died.

=== 26 July ===
- The Gaza Health Ministry increased its count of the Palestinian death toll due to Israeli attacks in Gaza to 73,326.
- Lebanon's army accused the IDF of continuing to attack the country's south in breach of the ceasefire.
- The Israeli security cabinet approved certain legal moves allowing the restricted entry of the International Stabilization Force into Gaza as part of the Board of Peace-led plan.

=== 27 July ===
- 60 Palestinian detainees were released by Israel into Gaza.
- The IDF and Shin Bet stated that they killed an al-Qassam Brigades militant who served as the Brigade's internal security chief in a strike in central Gaza and accused him of violating the ceasefire.
- The IDF announced that it killed an al-Quds Brigades Nukhba militant whom it accused of breaching the truce and another al-Qassam Brigades commander in its separate Gaza strikes. (Note: The IDF use the term to refer to similar specialized assault and commando echelons or platoons within the al-Quds Brigades, even though the Nukhba Force is the elite commando unit of the al-Qassam Brigades.) It added that it dismantled an al-Qassam Brigades northern Gaza tunnel network situated east of the Yellow Line in an area under its control and it demolished additional tunnel route measuring several hundred meters.

=== 29 July ===
- The IDF said that a Hezbollah drone attacked one of its engineering vehicles in southern Lebanon. Lebanese media, citing a local person, reported that the group hit the vehicle to prevent Israel from carrying out groundworks in the south of the country.

=== 30 July ===
- At least four people including an 18-month-old child and an eight-year-old girl were killed in Israeli strikes in Gaza. The IDF stated that it targeted al-Qassam Brigades militants.
- The IDF stated that it demolished a Hezbollah tunnel network sponsored by the Government of Iran in the Beaufort area.

=== 31 July ===
- President Trump said that his Board of Peace had reached an agreement to disarm Hamas and other militant organisations in Gaza. Hamas leader Ghazi Hamad declared that "draft agreement" announced by Trump calls for the transfer of heavy weaponry in Gaza to a Palestinian administration following Israeli withdrawal from Gaza.
- Israeli strikes and gunfire in Gaza killed one person and injured several others.
- The IDF stated that a strike intended to target an al-Qassam Brigades militant was diverted after other people were spotted.
- The IDF and Shin Bet stated that they killed in a Gaza City strike an al-Qassam Brigades deputy cell commander who was involved in holding hostage an Israeli woman and the remains of a female IDF soldier and accused him of using civil facilities for military purposes and targeting Israeli civilians during the war.

== August 2026 ==
=== 1 August ===
- Two people were killed in Israeli strikes in Gaza. The IDF stated that it targeted al-Qassam Brigades militants. The Gaza Health Ministry stated that a separate Israeli strike destroyed medicine warehouses used by Al-Aqsa Martyrs Hospital.
- The IDF announced that one of its officers was moderately injured amidst an operational activity in Lebanon's south.

=== 2 August ===
- At least 17 people including children were killed in Israeli strikes in Gaza. The IDF announced that its targets were militants.
- The IDF stated that it killed two al-Qassam Brigades commanders, including a Nukhba forces commander involved in the 7 October attacks in its strikes in Gaza.
- The al-Quds Brigades agreed to the Board of Peace disarmament plan for Gaza.
- The IDF said that it killed several Army of Islam militants in a Gaza strike.
- The 401st Brigade of the IDF claimed to have destroyed 1,200 Hezbollah tunnels, concluding their eight-month deployment.

=== 3 August ===
- The Gaza Health Ministry increased its count of the Palestinian death toll due to Israeli attacks in Gaza to 73,375.
- The IDF announced that it killed an al-Quds Brigades commander who invaded Israel amidst the 7 October attacks and held an Israeli hostage in a Deir el-Balah strike.

=== 4 August ===
- The remains of 112 people including children and women from the same clan were found from the debris of a structure in Gaza City's Sabra neighborhood which was hit in an Israeli strike during the war.
- The Israeli government ordered the IDF not to launch strikes in Gaza without the authorization of IDF chief of staff Lt. Gen. Eyal Zamir, following US pressure to limit Israel's operations in Gaza, allowing forces to strike without such approval only in "imminent danger".

=== 5 August ===
- The IDF said that two of its reservists were killed, and four were critically injured after being hit by an IED in Majdal Zoun. The IDF ordered to evacuate al-Mansouri, citing alleged "Hezbollah violations of truce". It later stated that it executed precision strikes in Lebanon's south. It later announced that it struck Hezbollah infrastructure.

=== 7 August ===
- Lebanon and Israel agreed on a shortlist of states that could send forces to verify Hezbollah disarmament.
- A Hezbollah drone struck in the vicinity of Israeli soldiers in the Ali Taher Ridge in Lebanon's south in an apparent Hezbollah breach of the truce.

=== 8 August ===
- The Gaza Health Ministry increased its count of the Palestinian death toll due to Israeli attacks in Gaza to 73,384.
- The IDF said that one of its soldiers was moderately injured in an "operational accident" in Lebanon's south.
- Lebanon stated that Israeli soldiers crossed into Zawtar al-Gharbiyah and constructed an earthen barrier. The IDF stated that it was unaware of such an incident.

=== 9 August ===
- The Gaza Health Ministry stated that one person was killed in Israeli attacks in the last 24 hours while the remains of another individual killed in a prior Israeli attack was recovered from rubble, increasing its count of the Palestinian death toll due to Israeli attacks in Gaza to 73,385.
- The Lebanese Health Ministry increased the Lebanese death toll due to Israeli attacks since 2 March according to its count to 4,335.
- The IDF and Shin Bet admitted for the first time a special mission to target and kill all 7 October militants, adding that over 2,700 out of an estimated 5,000 militants who took part in the attacks have been confirmed by the IDF to have been killed.
- Prime Minister Netanyahu announced Israel’s rejection of the deal drafted by President Trump's Gaza Board of Peace.

=== 11 August ===
- NNA reported that an Israeli drone attack targeted a vehicle on Nabatieh's outskirts, adding that an ambulance team from the Hezbollah-connected Islamic Health Authority, Islamic Message Scouts Association, and other medical staff was bombed in another attack while transporting a wounded individual in the area, injuring two people and damaging an ambulance. The IDF denied responsibility.

=== 12 August ===
- The IDF stated that it mistakenly fired an interceptor at its soldiers in Lebanon's south, without causing casualties.
- One person was seriously injured in an Israeli strike while riding on a rickshaw in Beit Lahia. The IDF stated that it targeted an al-Qassam Brigades commander whom it accused of violating the ceasefire.

=== 13 August ===
- The mandate of the European Union Border Assistance Mission to Rafah and the European Union Police Mission for the Palestinian Territories at the Rafah crossing was extended by Israel till the end of June next year.
- Two people including a senior police official were killed in Israeli strikes in Gaza. The IDF stated that one of those strikes targeted an al-Qasam Brigades commander whom it accused of violating the truce.

=== 14 August ===
- The IDF announced that it killed an al-Qassam Brigades company commander in a Khan Yunis strike the day before.

=== 15 August ===
- The IDF stated that an explosive device struck one of its tanks in southern Gaza. It added that it killed two militants.
- Lebanese President Joseph Aoun and Lebanese media announced that an Israeli attack in Ansar killed seven people and injured three others, all members of same family including children and women. It also reported that a wave of attacks occurred in the Nabatieh area, including on the Ali Taher Ridge, under which Hezbollah has a large tunnel. The IDF stated that it was in retaliation to an alleged Hezbollah ceasefire violation, in which three of its soldiers were critically injured. It added that a Redwan Force battalion commander was killed in the strike and accused him of using his own family as human shields in the Redwan headquarters.
- An Israeli strike in Deir ez-Zahrani killed four people.

=== 16 August ===
- Lebanese media declared that Israeli attacks hit Ali Taher Ridge area in the country's south.
- The IDF announced that it killed a Hezbollah’s Badr regional division's senior commander in a strike in Deir al-Zahrani the previous day.

=== 17 August ===
- The Gaza Health Ministry stated that the remains of five people killed in Israeli attacks arrived at hospitals throughout Gaza, increasing its count of the Palestinian death toll due to Israeli attacks in Gaza to 73,399.
- Prime Minister Netanyahu's office announced that he agreed to organize "working groups" on Gaza demilitarization and humanitarian needs during a meeting with White House and Board of Peace representatives. The meeting also concluded with a deal to allow the IDF to continue conduct targeted strikes in Gaza for now.
- UNIFIL stated that Israeli flags on a Lebanese street breach United Nations Security Council Resolution 1701.

=== 18 August ===
- At least six people including a child were killed and 14 others were injured in an Israeli strike on a small cafe inside the Port of Gaza. The IDF said that it targeted armed al-Qassam Brigades commanders, whom it accused of planning to conduct attacks against its soldiers deployed in the strip, adding that it also killed several other militants, without providing proof.
- The IDF stated that it killed an al-Quds Brigade militant who entered Israel as part of the 7 October attacks and took an Israeli as hostage.

=== 19 August ===
- At least nine people including a 13-year-old girl were killed and 15 others were injured in an Israeli strike on municipal police headquarters in Gaza. The IDF stated that it targeted al-Qassam Brigades militants who it said "operated from the civilian police station" to advance attacks on its forces. One person was killed in a separate Israeli strike in Nuseirat refugee camp. The IDF said that it struck an al-Qassam Brigades militant.

=== 20 August ===
- The US imposed sanctions against Hezbollah, citing its actions on behalf of the Government of Iran.

=== 21 August ===
- The IDF stated that it hit a structure in Baraashit after suspects "posing threat" entered there.
- The IDF stated that it opened fire at a person who entered its buffer zone in Gaza's south.

=== 22 August ===
- The IDF stated that it killed an al-Qassam Brigades' Deir al-Balah Battalion company commander who posed "imminent threat" to its soldiers in a central Gaza strike.

=== 23 August ===
- The Gaza Health Ministry increased its count of the Palestinian death toll due to Israeli attacks in Gaza to 73,420.
- The Israeli government ordered the IDF to execute a severe military response after several kites believed to have originated from Gaza landed in the vicinity of Nahal Oz.
- Two people including a four-year-old boy were killed and five others were injured in Israeli strikes in Gaza. One of those strikes came after an Israeli evacuation order.

=== 24 August ===
- A 10-year-old girl was killed in apparent Israeli fire in Khan Yunis. The IDF stated that it was unaware of the event. Separate Israeli strikes on a home in Bureij refugee camp and a street in Khan Yunis killed two people including a four-year-old boy and injured his mother and sister. One individual was killed and another was injured in an Israeli strike that hit a tent in Deir Al-Balah. The IDF stated that it targeted a Nukhba forces militant. The IDF also stated that it conducted strikes in the Shati refugee camp and in Deir al-Balah following warnings, targeting what it cast as two al-Qassam Brigades arms depots inside mosques. It did not provide proof but said the facilities stored dozens of “Kalashnikov rifles, magazines and additional military equipment.”
- The head of the Sha'ar HaNegev Regional Council announced that a kite presumably launched from Gaza landed in Nahal Oz.
- The popular committees, which are made up of local NGO's and charity representatives that run Gaza displacement camps and shelters warned parents to cease their children flying kites in a declaration coordinated with the Hamas government.

=== 26 August ===
- The IDF stated that it hit an al-Qassam Brigades site in the vicinity of Kamal Adwan Hospital and a school in Jabalia.

=== 27 August ===
- The IDF accused Hezbollah of firing two explosive UAVs towards its soldiers in Ali Taher Ridge, adding that it hit Hezbollah munitions storage facilities after the attack. NNA reported that Israel attacks in Arabsalim killed a woman and injured others.
- Prime Minister Netanyahu called off the IDF opening of the Erez border crossing.
- The IDF stated that it killed two Nukhba forces militants who infiltrated its Re'im camp in southern Israel amidst the 7 October attacks.

=== 28 August ===
- Local health officials said that five people were killed in Israeli strikes in Gaza. The IDF confirmed that it hit two separate parts of the Gaza City, adding that it killed an al-Qassam Brigades militant and his two accomplices in a strike on a car in Jenin. al-Qassam Brigades and al-Quds Brigades confirmed one of them as their member.
- The Lebanese Health Ministry increased the Lebanese death toll due to Israeli attacks since 2 March according to its count to 4,352.
- The IDF announced it killed an al-Qassam Brigades anti-tank unit commander and a member of the Khan Yunis brigade following strikes in Shati and Khan Yunis respectively and accused them of violating the ceasefire.
- The IDF declared that it killed an al-Qassam Brigades commander who took part in the 7 October attacks and a PIJ observation platoon commander in different Gaza strikes and accused them of violating the truce.

=== 29 August ===
- Lebanese media reported that Israel conducted an attack in Nabatieh al-Fawqa.
- The IDF stated that it targeted an al-Qassam Brigades commander in Gaza.

=== 30 August ===
- Two people including a three-year-old boy were killed and several others were injured in an Israeli strike in the vicinity of a bakery in Deir Al-Balah. The IDF stated that one of those killed was an al-Qassam Brigades militant and accused him of violating the truce.
- The IDF announced that it targeted two Nukhba forces militants whom it accused of breaching the truce in a Khan Yunis strike.
- The IDF declared that it killed two al-Qassam Brigades militants including a Nukhba forces commander who was involved in the 7 October attacks in a northern Gaza strike.
- Lebanese media reported that Israeli strikes hit Yohmor.

== September 2026 ==
=== 1 September ===
- The IDF announced that Shin Bet special forces arrested the head of al-Qassam Brigades' internal security service from Gaza City in a joint operation. Hamas-run Gaza Interior Ministry confirmed that he was wounded and captured by Israel. Netanyahu declared that he was responsible for concealing and transporting Israeli hostages captured during the 7 October attacks. At least four people ‌including two children were killed and several others were injured in Israeli strikes during the operation. A child was killed in apparent Israeli fire in central Gaza. Another person was killed in a Jabalia strike.

=== 2 September ===
- The IDF announced that it killed an al-Qassam Brigades' Military Security Department in its Gaza City Brigade and another al-Qassam Brigades militant in a strike in Gaza and accused them of breaching the truce.
- The IDF stated that Hezbollah fired two drones towards its soldiers in south Lebanon's Ali Taher Ridge overnight, adding that the group’s facilities were hit in retaliation.

=== 3 September ===
- The IDF declared that it killed a militant who posed 'immediate threat' in Gaza's north.
- The IDF stated that it killed two people who entered the Yellow Line.
- Prime Minister Netanyahu announced that five Lebanese civilians were released by Israel in exchange for information on Jewish remains in Lebanon.

=== 4 September ===
- The IDF stated that it carried out strikes in northern Gaza after its soldiers were attacked in the vicinity of the Yellow Line, calling it a breach of the truce by militants.
- The IDF and Shin Bet stated they killed an al-Qassam Brigades commander who attacked the Sufa base in southern Israel during the 7 October attacks.
- NNA reported that two people traveling in a bike were killed in an Israeli strike in Nabatieh.
- The IDF stated that it launched strikes on Hezbollah targets after an explosive UAV was fired at its forces in Lebanon's south. The Lebanese Health Ministry stated that those attacks killed three people and wounded 23 others including medics, children and women.

=== 5 September ===
- The IDF announced that it mistakenly fired an interceptor missile in response to its own gunfire in Gaza.

=== 6 September ===
- Two people including an eight-year-girl were killed and six others were injured in an Israeli strike on a vehicle in western Gaza City. The IDF stated that it targeted an al-Qassam Brigades militant.
- The IDF stated that it launched strikes on targets in Lebanon's south after Hezbollah fired two explosive UAVs toward its soldiers deployed in the Ali Taher Ridge, describing it as a truce breach by Hezbollah militants. It later issued an evacuation order for Arabsalim, saying that a structure in the town is owned by Hezbollah. Lebanon's Health Ministry announced that four people were killed and 20 others were injured in those attacks, adding that a hospital was destroyed in an Israeli strike in the vicinity of the Ridge.
- Lebanese media reported that an Israeli strike in Nabatieh killed three people.

=== 7 September ===
- The IDF ordered to evacuate a specific area in Deir al-Zahrani, saying that its target is a facility used by Hezbollah militants. Israeli strikes were later reported in the region. NNA reported that separate Israeli strikes in Lebanon's south killed at least 11 people including two children and two paramedics with the Amal Movement-affiliated Risala Scouts and injured five others.
- The IDF stated that Hezbollah fired explosive UAVs at its soldiers in Ali Taher Ridge area for the third time in seven days, triggering strikes targeting militants in retaliation.
- The IDF stated that two of its soldiers were slightly injured in a clash with a Hezbollah militant who was killed in the vicinity of Beaufort Castle.

=== 10 September ===
- Four people including an eight year-old girl, a twelve year-old girl and a woman were killed in an Israeli strike that hit a house in Beit Lahia. The IDF stated that one of those killed was a militant who was involved in direct combat against its soldiers.
- Prime Minister Netanyahu announced that the IDF destroyed a strategic subterranean Hezbollah complex at the Ali Taher Ridge using more than 1,000 tons of TNT (4,200 GJ) of explosives to destroy tunnels stretching 2 kilometres (1.2 mi) underneath the ridge and setting off tremors that measured 4.1 on the Richter scale.

=== 11 September ===
- The al-Qassam Brigades announced that one of its members who served in the brigade higher leadership council and as its Khan Yunis Brigade commander was killed in an Israeli strike, adding that he played a significant role in planning the 7 October attacks. The IDF declared that he was killed in a Khan Yunis strike, adding that a company commander and another al-Qassam Brigades militant were also killed in that strike.
- The IDF and Shin Bet announced that they killed the leader of a sniper cell in al-Qassam Brigades' Rafah Brigade in a Khan Yunis strike and accused him of breaching the truce.

=== 13 September ===
- At least two people were killed and 13 others were injured in an Israeli strike on a vehicle in Gaza City's Tel Al-Hawa neighbourhood. The IDF announced that it targeted two al-Qassam Brigades militants.
- NNA reported that Israel conducted strikes in the vicinity of Nabatieh al-Fawqa and Tel al-Dabsha.

=== 15 September ===
- The IDF declared that it killed two al-Qassam Brigades commanders in two Gaza strikes and one of them was involved in training Brigade militants before the 7 October attacks. It also stated that it killed an al-Qassam Brigades militant who took part in producing munitions for the group.
- The IDF and Shin Bet stated that they killed an al-Qassam Brigades militant who served as commander of Rafah Brigade, chief of the Brigade operations array and participated in the 7 October attacks in a southern Gaza strike.

=== 16 September ===
- A five-story apartment building collapsed from damage caused in prior Israeli strikes in Gaza City, killing at least 21 people, including 11 children and five women, and wounded at least 14 others.
- The IDF announced that it killed an al-Qassam Brigades militant in a Gaza City bombing and accused him of breaching the truce.

=== 17 September ===
- The IDF declared that it killed two Nukhba forces commanders in Gaza's north.
- The IDF stated it killed a Nukhba commander who participated in the 7 October attacks.
- The Lebanese Health Ministry increased the Lebanese death toll due to Israeli attacks since 2 March according to its count to 4,386.

=== 19 September ===
- The IDF declared that it killed an al-Qassam Brigades commander who was involved in the 7 October attacks in a Khan Yunis strike.
- The IDF announced that it hit Hezbollah targets after the latter's explosive device slightly injured two of its soldiers in its buffer zone in Lebanon's south.

=== 20 September ===
- The IDF and Shin Bet announced that they killed an al-Qassam Brigades militant who took part in the 7 October attacks, as well as two other militants from the Brigade.

=== 21 September ===
- The IDF stated that it struck al-Qassam Brigades infrastructure in Gaza after one of its engineering vehicles drove over an explosive device amidst a routine operation in the Yellow Line, without causing casualties.

=== 22 September ===
- The Gaza Health Ministry increased its count of the Palestinian death toll due to Israeli attacks in Gaza to 73,919.

=== 23 September ===
- At least four people were killed and two were wounded in Israeli strikes in Gaza. Israeli officials stated that one of the killed was Hamas finance chief Mohammad Abu Elwan.

=== 25 September ===
- The IDF stated that two of its soldiers were killed by an explosion of its own drone in a Gaza outpost amidst an operation.
- The IDF stated that it fired an interceptor against a “suspicious aerial target” spotted above a south Lebanon area where its soldiers are deployed.

=== 26 September ===
- The IDF stated that it bombed a Hezbollah munitions cache to "remove a threat" to its soldiers deployed in its security zone in Lebanon's south.

=== 27 September ===
- The IDF stated that Hezbollah targeted its soldiers operating in its buffer zone in Lebanon's south with an explosive drone, triggering strikes on the latter's sites in retaliation.

=== 28 September ===
- An Israeli strike hit the rooftop of a building in Gaza City, killing two people including a woman and injuring others. A woman was killed and others were injured in another Israeli strike in Nuseirat refugee camp. The IDF stated that it targeted a militant in Nuseirat.
- The IDF announced completion of a major operation to dismantle Hezbollah facilities in Al-Mansouri, a town situated inside its security zone in Lebanon's south.
- The IDF stated that it fired an interceptor against a "suspicious aerial target" above its soldiers in Lebanese territory.

=== 29 September ===
- The IDF and Hamas confirmed the death of Izz al-Din Al-Beik, al-Qassam Brigades chief in Gaza's north in an Israel strike on an apartment building in Nasser neighbourhood of Gaza City, whom Prime Minister Netanyahu and Defence Minister Katz accused of violating the ceasefire. Gaza health officials stated that another individual died from their injuries following the strike. Hamas announced that he co-planned the 7 October attacks. At least three people were killed by two separate Israeli strikes in Jabalia refugee camp. The IDF declared that those strikes targeted militants.

=== 30 September ===
- At least seven people including a woman were killed and others were injured in Israeli strikes in Gaza. The IDF announced that one of those strikes targeted an al-Qassam Brigades militant who intended to violate the ceasefire.

== October 2026 ==
=== 1 October ===
- The IDF launched a dedicated website and claimed that a probe into 170 people killed in Gaza who had been publicly identified as journalists revealed they were active militants for militant groups. According to the IDF, 118 were members of al-Qassam Brigades, 49 belonged to al-Quds Brigades, two were with the Al-Nasser Salah al-Deen Brigades, and one was with the Mujahideen Brigades. The IDF stated that 17 of the individuals had participated in the 7 October attacks.

=== 2 October ===
- The US imposed sanctions on Hamas' financing network, which includes two French-based funds.

=== 3 October ===
- The IDF declared that it has killed more than 24,000 militants in Gaza. (Note: The IDF estimated that for every dead militant, two to three civilians were killed.)
- At least five people including four women were killed in an Israeli strike that hit an apartment in Gaza City. The IDF stated that the de facto leader of Hamas in the Gaza Strip, Ali al-Amoudi was targeted in the strike, which also killed two members of Gaza's Greek Orthodox church.
- The IDF announced that eight of its soldiers were slightly injured after two vehicles crashed into each other in Rab Thalathin.

=== 4 October ===
- One person was killed and at least 11 others were injured in an Israeli strike on a vehicle in central Gaza. The IDF stated that it targeted an al-Qassam Brigades militant.
- The IDF announced that one of its soldiers was critically injured and another was moderately wounded due to an accidental grenade explosion in Lebanon's south.

=== 5 October ===
- Hamas announced that the de facto leader of the group in the Gaza Strip, Ali al-Amoudi, survived the Israeli attempt to assassinate him.

=== 6 October ===
- At least two people were killed in Israeli strikes in Gaza, which the IDF described as targeting militants.

=== 7 October ===
- A civil defence worker was killed in an Israeli strike near Kamal Adwan hospital in Gaza's north. The IDF stated that he was also an al-Qassam Brigades militant. Two others were killed and at least a dozen others were injured in separate Israeli strikes in the enclave's south. The IDF announced that one strike targeted a militant, adding that it was unaware of the second strike.
- The IDF reported that it launched an interceptor at a "false target" in Lebanon's south.
- The UNIFIL stated that gunfire hit its base in the vicinity of Kfar Shouba.

=== 8 October ===
- The IDF declared that one of its soldiers were killed and three others were injured after a vehicle overturned amidst operational activity in Lebanon's south.

=== 9 October ===
- NNA reported that an Israeli attack hit a vehicle in Hosh al-Sayed Ali, Hermel District. The IDF stated it conducted a strike on a Syrian militant who planned attacks against Israeli civilians and it under the direction of the Iranian regime. The Lebanese Health Ministry announced that six people including five Syrians were injured in the attack.

=== 10 October ===
- Four people were killed in an Israeli strike near Panda Mall in Gaza City, while one person was killed in another strike in the city's Tuffah neighborhood. The IDF stated that both strikes targeted militants.
- The IDF declared that it fired an interceptor targeting a "suspicious aerial target" in Lebanon's south.

=== 11 October ===
- Three people were killed in an Israeli strike that hit a tent in Al-Mawasi. The IDF stated that it targeted militants in the region.
- Israel allowed an American company to enter Gaza within days and begin mapping locations where Hamas can hand over firearms and combat equipment for destruction.
- NNA and a local mayor reported that two people were killed in Lebanon's south, one by an Israeli attack and the other by an unexploded ordnance left by the war, as they participated in the yearly olive harvest.
- The IDF declared that it targeted a "suspicious aerial target" in Lebanon's south with an interceptor.

=== 12 October ===
- At least two people were killed in an Israeli strike in Gaza's south. The IDF declared that it targeted a militant in the strike.
- The IDF announced that it fired an interceptor against a suspicious target in Lebanon's south.

=== 13 October ===
- The Deutsche Gesellschaft für Internationale Zusammenarbeit and the National Committee for the Administration of Gaza signed a memorandum of understanding to support "recovery and reconstruction" in Gaza.

=== 14 October ===
- One woman was killed in an Israeli strike that hit an apartment in Gaza City, which the IDF described as targeting a militant.
- Israel's Coordinator of Government Activities in the Territories said that private-sector merchants in Gaza have announced that they are suspending coordination for the entry of goods into the Strip until further notice, following what it describes as a forced taxation mechanism imposed by Hamas and escalating threats against merchants, a claim denied by the group. Israeli government later declared that no commercial goods are entering into the strip.

=== 15 October ===
- The IDF stated that it used an interceptor following "false identification" in a region of south Lebanon where its soldiers are deployed.

=== 16 October ===
- The IDF reported that interceptors were utilized against "false target" above its soldiers in Lebanon's south.

=== 19 October ===
- Israeli strikes in Gaza City and Khan Yunis killed at least five people, including a 14-year-old boy.
- Due to a shortage of financing, the World Food Program announced that it will stop providing monthly aid to 500,000 Palestinians in Gaza.
- After merchants reported that Hamas authorities had withdrawn demands for payments of 10,000 shekels ($3,225) per truck, which Hamas described as a voluntary contribution by better-off Palestinians in Gaza to a national fund supporting people in need in the territory, Israel's COGAT announced that it would resume permitting commercial goods shipments into Gaza.

=== 20 October ===
- At least four people including a 17-year-old boy and a woman were killed in Israeli strikes in Gaza. The IDF stated that one of those killed was a senior official in Hamas's general security apparatus in Gaza who was responsible with protecting senior Hamas officials.

=== 22 October ===
- Three people including a woman were killed in Israeli strikes in Gaza, with the IDF describing that it targeted al-Qassam Brigades militants in three areas of Gaza. It added that it was unaware of one of those incidents.
- The Red Cross announced that it had facilitated the release of the body of a Palestinian from Gaza who died in IDF detention under unexplained circumstances a week after the 7 October attacks.

=== 25 October ===
- Palestinian media reported that an Israeli strike hit Islamic University of Gaza, killing three administrative staff and wounding eight students. The IDF reported that the strike intended to target an al-Qassam Brigades militant was diverted to prevent civilian casualties.
- The IDF announced that it used an interceptor towards a target above Lebanon's south.

=== 26 October ===
- The IDF announced that it intercepted a drone flown to Gaza from Israel.

=== 28 October ===
- The IDF announced that it deployed an interceptor against a suspicious target above Lebanon's south.

== November 2026 ==
=== 2 November ===
- Two separate Israeli strikes in Khan Yunis killed two people and injured six others, while a person was killed in an Israeli strike in Al-Musaddar. One person was killed and others were injured in another Israeli strike in Tel al-Hawa. The IDF acknowledged that it conducted three of those strikes in the strip, targeting militants.

=== 4 November ===
- One paramedic with the Amal movement’s Risala Scouts was killed and another person was wounded in an Israeli strike that hit a motorcycle in Lebanon's south. Israel announced that it targeted suspects who were “observing IDF troops.”

=== 8 November ===
- The IDF stated that it discovered munitions and facilities used by Hezbollah in the vicinity of the UNIFIL sites in Lebanon's south including from a civilian house.

=== 9 November ===
- Lebanese media announced that Israel attacks hit Qantara and Kfar Tebnit.

=== 10 November ===
- At least seven people including a 13-year-old child were killed in Israeli strikes in Gaza. The IDF stated that it targeted militants in two of those strikes.
- The UNIFIL reported that "about a dozen round" were fired at one of its patrols in the region of Wadi Jilu.

=== 11 November ===
- Three people were killed in Israeli strikes in Gaza City, which the IDF said targeted militants.
- At least six people were killed, including a surgeon, a 13-year-old child and 28 others were injured in an Israeli strike that hit a building at Nasser Hospital. The IDF stated it had targeted Muhammad Abu Ismail, the commander of al-Qassam Brigades' Khan Yunis Brigade, and other militants who it described as operating inside the hospital and accused Hamas of using the hospital complex for militant purposes.
- Separate Israeli strikes in Gaza killed five people. The IDF stated that two of those strikes targeted an al-Qassam Brigades militants.
- At least one person was killed and a boy was wounded in an Israeli strike in Deir al-Balah.

=== 14 November ===
- An Israeli strike in Jabalia killed two people and injured several others. The IDF stated that it targeted two al-Qassam Brigades militants in the region.
- Hamas announced that Samir Abu Younis, the commander of its Rafah Brigade, was killed in an Israeli strike in Khan Yunis.

=== 15 November ===
- The IDF reported that it destroyed a Hezbollah tunnel in Majdal Zoun.

=== 16 November ===
- Lebanese media reported an Israeli strike in an area near the country's border with Syria. The IDF stated that the strike was intended to disrupt a munitions shipment for Hezbollah.
- NNA reported that the IDF apprehended two Lebanese men from their house on the outskirts of Shebaa, accusing the latter of "ransacking its contents and damaging belongings.”
- The European Union imposed terrorism sanctions on Gaza Now and its founder for allegedly soliciting funds for Hamas.

=== 17 November ===
- Four people including a six-year-old boy were killed in Israeli strikes in Gaza.

=== 18 November ===
- To target what it described as a tunnel posing a threat to troops, the IDF initiated a ground operation west of the Yellow Line in the central Gaza Strip, advancing tanks onto Salah al-Din Road close to the Nuseirat and Bureij refugee camps. The raid was denounced by Hamas as a blatant breach of the October 2025 ceasefire, caused civilian evacuations, and stopped traffic along the highway.
- Three Palestinians were reportedly killed by separate Israeli airstrikes in Deir al-Balah, Gaza City, and close to the ground raid in central Gaza. A child was also injured in apparent Israeli fire. The IDF stated that it was unaware of the Deir al-Balah incident and it targeted a militant in Gaza City.
- The IDF stated that it dismantled subterranean Hezbollah infrastructure in the Shebaa Farms.

=== 19 November ===
- The IDF announced that it completed a tank raid targeting "Hamas infrastructure" in central Gaza.
- Israeli strikes in Gaza City's Zeitoun neighbourhood killed two people.
- Lebanese media reported Israeli strikes in al-Sha’ra area of Beqaa Valley, which the IDF described as targeting the entrances to a Hezbollah missile site.

=== 21 November ===
- Three people were killed in an Israeli strike that hit a truck in Gaza City. The IDF stated that it targeted al-Quds Brigades militants and that the vehicle had been transporting food to the group's members.
