= Deir ez-Zahrani =

Deir ez-Zahrani دير الزهراني
- Municipality
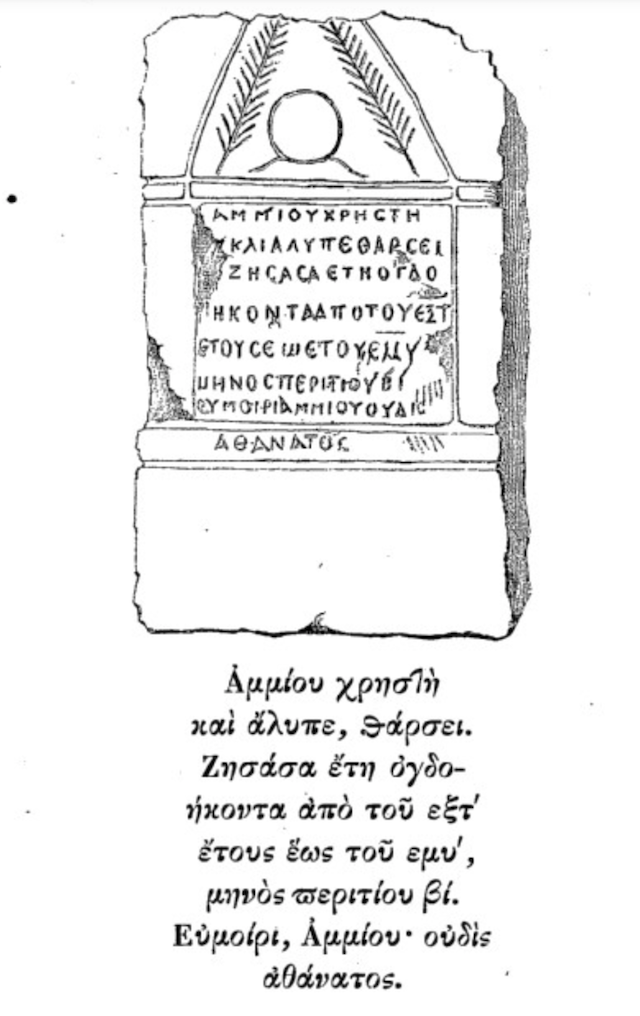
- A cippus, found by Renan in Deir ez-Zahrani

- Location in Lebanon
- Coordinates: 33°25′52″N 35°27′34″E
- Country: Lebanon
- Governorate: Nabatieh Governorate
- District: Nabatieh District

Area
  - Land: 4.67 sq mi (12.09 km^{2})
- Elevation: 1,300 ft (400 m)
- Time zone: UTC+2 (EET)
  - Summer (DST): +3

Deir ez-Zahrani (Arabic: دير الزهراني, romanized: Dayr az-Zahrānī) is a municipality in southern Lebanon. It is located 75 kilometres (47 mi) from Beirut.

== History ==
In 1875 Victor Guérin noted: "[Deir Zaharany] is located on a hill, has a population of 100 Métualis, to which must be added about twenty Christians. It succeeded an ancient locality, as evidenced by several fragments of scattered columns here and there and a number of ashlars embedded in a ruined mosque and in private houses. It was in one of these dwellings that was found in 1861, and brought back to the khan of Saida, an ancient funerary cippe, with palm, crown and lemnisque, and whose Greek inscription was reproduced by Mr. Renan."

On 15 August 2026, four people were killed in an Israeli airstrike in the village.

== Demographics ==
In 2014 Muslims made up 97.67% of registered voters in Deir ez-Zahrani. 97.04% of the voters were Shiite Muslims.

== Bibliography ==
- Guérin, V. (1880). Description Géographique Historique et Archéologique de la Palestine (in French). Vol. 3: Galilee, pt. 2. Paris: L'Imprimerie Nationale.
- Renan, E. (1864). Mission de Phénicie (in French). Vol. 1. p. 523.
