= 2026 Iran war ceasefire =

- Part of the 2025–2026 Iran–United States negotiations
- Date: 8 April – 8 July 2026
- Location: West Asia
- Type: Ceasefire
- Cause: 2026 Iran war; 2026 Strait of Hormuz crisis; 2026 Lebanon war
- Motive: To end the Iran war; To end the Lebanon war (claimed by Iran and Pakistan; denied by Israel and the US); To reopen the Strait of Hormuz; To reenable pathways to nuclear negotiations; To ensure long-term peace and stability in the Middle East
- Organized by: Pakistan
- Participants: Iran; United States
- Outcome: United States and Iran agreed on temporary ceasefire for two weeks: Islamabad Talks fail; United States imposes a naval blockade on Iran; United States unilaterally enacts indefinite period of ceasefire without Iran or Israel choosing to end it; Islamabad Memorandum; Fighting resumes on 8 July

On 8 April 2026, (Note: The ceasefire was announced and came into effect on 8 April in the Middle East, where the fighting was happening; it was 7 April in the US.) the United States and Iran agreed to a two-week ceasefire in the 2026 Iran war, mediated by Pakistan. Iran had rejected the draft proposal for a 45-day two-phase ceasefire framework introduced on 5 April by Pakistan, instead proposing its own 10-point plan for a peace agreement. The proposal was developed as part of ongoing mediation efforts involving regional and international actors during the 2025–2026 negotiations. Since its declaration, the ceasefire was violated by both sides numerous times. On 21 April, US president Donald Trump extended the ceasefire indefinitely. On 8 July, the ceasefire deal collapsed after attacks by both sides.

Low-intensity fighting between the US and Iran continued intermittently. Later, Trump decided to arrive at a more comprehensive ceasefire that would lead to an US–Iranian agreement. As a result, new ceasefire conditions were agreed upon on 12 June. On 17 June, the presidents of both countries signed the Islamabad Memorandum, a memorandum of understanding that formalized the process of ending the war and established a 60-day period to negotiate the final terms of a deal.

== Background ==
On 25 February 2026, the United States Department of the Treasury imposed sanctions on more than 30 individuals, entities, and vessels linked to Iran's oil shipping network and other designated activities.

On 28 February 2026, Israel and the United States launched airstrikes against Iran, killing its supreme leader and many other officials, destroying a large number of military and government targets, and killing civilians. Iran responded with missile and drone strikes against Israel, US bases, and US-allied countries in the Middle East, and by closing the Strait of Hormuz, disrupting global trade.

US president Donald Trump wrote on 6 March 2026 that "There will be no deal with Iran except UNCONDITIONAL SURRENDER!". On 9 March, Trump said that "the war is very complete, pretty much", and falsely claimed that the Iranian military had been destroyed and the Strait of Hormuz had re-opened. On 15 March he demanded that NATO and China help the US to re-open the strait. Trump again claimed on 24 March that the US and Israel had "won" the war, even though Iran continued its missile strikes. In late March, Trump repeatedly threatened to destroy Iran's infrastructure if it did not make a "deal" with the US and re-open the Hormuz strait.

Trump said on 23 March that the US has been speaking to "a top person" in Iran and claimed "They called, I didn't call. They want to make a deal, and we are very willing to make a deal". The IRGC-affiliated Fars News denied there had been any negotiations with Trump. The Iranian foreign ministry said it was merely reviewing proposals from the US sent through mediators.

On 25 March, Pakistani officials delivered a "15-point proposal" from the US to Iran, detailing a ceasefire plan. The US proposal included an end to Iran's nuclear program, limits on its missiles, reopening the Strait of Hormuz, restrictions on Iran's support for armed groups, and sanctions relief for Iran. The Iranians rejected the US proposal, with an anonymous official telling Press TV that "Iran will end the war when it decides to do so and when its own conditions are met". The Iranians issued a "5-point counter-proposal", including an end to US-Israeli attacks on Iran and pro-Iranian forces in Lebanon and Iraq, security guarantees to prevent future Israeli and US aggression, war reparations, and international recognition of Iranian sovereignty over the Strait of Hormuz.

On 31 March, Pakistan and China delivered a "5 point initiative" for peace, calling for an immediate end to all hostilities and allowance of humanitarian aid into the region. Trump claimed on 1 April 2026 that Iran had just asked the US for a ceasefire and that the US would consider it once the Strait of Hormuz was "open, free, and clear. Until then, we are blasting Iran into oblivion ... back to the Stone Ages!". Iran's foreign ministry called the claim "false and baseless". The IRGC said the strait "will not be opened to the enemies of this nation through the ridiculous spectacle by the president of the US".

The Financial Times reported that the US pushed Pakistan to broker a temporary ceasefire in early April. The next ceasefire proposal was introduced on 5 April, amidst threats from US president Trump to destroy Iranian power plants and bridges if Iran did not re-open the Strait of Hormuz. It was reportedly negotiated between Pakistani army staff chief Asim Munir, US vice president JD Vance, US special envoy Steve Witkoff, and Iranian foreign minister Abbas Araghchi. On 7 April, Trump threatened that "A whole civilization will die tonight, never to be brought back", if Iran did not reach an agreement with the US. On 21 April, Trump announced that the US was extending the ceasefire with Iran pending negotiations, while instructing the naval blockade to remain in place and telling the military to remain prepared to resume fighting. However, Axios reported that Trump does not intend to extend the ceasefire for more than a few days. On June 11, Trump announced that a ceasefire for further 60 days was reached, that would enable the parties to negotiate all the contentious issues for a final agreement.

== Components ==
The ceasefire framework called for an immediate halt to hostilities, the reopening of the Strait of Hormuz, and a 15–20 day period of negotiations between Iran and the US

=== United States plan ===
1. Immediate ceasefire: An immediate end to hostilities between the US (and Israel) and Iran.
2. Two-phase agreement structure:
  - Phase 1: Temporary ceasefire;
  - Phase 2: Negotiating for a permanent settlement.
3. Reopening the Strait of Hormuz: Iran must immediately reopen the Strait of Hormuz, restoring global oil flow.
4. Guaranteed maritime security: Creating a regional framework ensuring safe navigation through the Strait of Hormuz.
5. Nuclear constraints on Iran: Iran commits to stop its alleged pursuit of nuclear weapons as part of the final deal
6. Sanctions relief (conditional): The US signaled willingness to ease sanctions, but only in exchange for Iranian concessions.
7. Release of frozen Iranian assets: Part of incentives included unfreezing Iranian funds abroad
8. Structured negotiations via mediators: All talks will be channeled through Pakistan initially, then finalized in Islamabad.
9. Possible extended ceasefire window: During Phase 2 the discussions will be over a period of 45 days.
10. Broader regional de-escalation: The agreement aims to stabilize additional conflicts in the Middle East, not just the war with Iran.

=== Iranian plan ===
1. Cessation of the war on Iraq, Lebanon, and Yemen
2. Cessation of the war in Iran with no time limit
3. Ending all conflicts in the region
4. Reopening the Strait of Hormuz
5. Establishing a protocol and conditions to ensure freedom and security of navigation in the Strait
6. Full payment of war reparations to Iran
7. Lifting sanctions on Iran
8. Release of the Iranian frozen assets held by the United States
9. Iran commits to not seeking possession of any nuclear weapons
10. Immediate ceasefire on all fronts upon the ceasefire announcement

Further complicating matters, Iran released several different version of the plan, with small differences, and differences between the Persian and English versions.

== Implementation ==
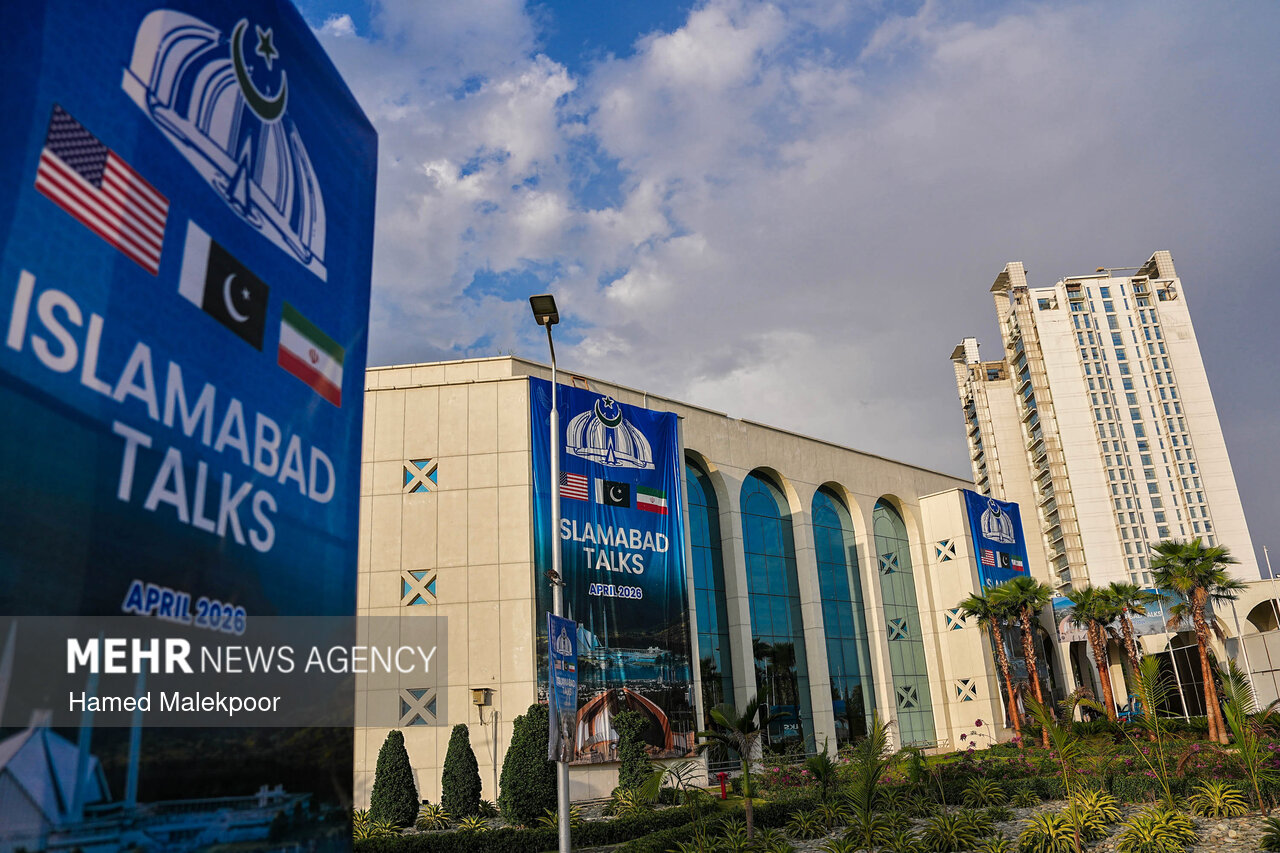
The Islamabad Talks were held at the Serena Hotel in Islamabad

On 7 April (8 April in Iran and Israel), Trump announced that he agreed to a two-week ceasefire with Iran and the proposal by Pakistan, stating that Iran would immediately open the Strait of Hormuz and work on finalizing a peace agreement. Later on the same day, Abbas Araghchi announced that Iran had agreed to the conditions. Iran claimed victory, asserting that it had forced the US to accept its 10-point plan, which includes lifting all sanctions on Iran and withdrawing all US forces from all bases in the region. Trump said the Iranian 10 point proposal was a "workable basis on which to negotiate".

Hezbollah announced a pause in attacks against Israel, according to the ceasefire. Israel has also agreed to the temporary ceasefire. According to Pakistani Prime Minister Shehbaz Sharif, the ceasefire includes all fronts of the war, including Lebanon. Israeli Prime Minister Benjamin Netanyahu rejected Sharif's inclusion of Lebanon, asserting that the ceasefire "does not include Lebanon", an assertion backed by Trump and Vance. Hezbollah said that it halted attacks on Israel and on Israeli soldiers in Lebanon. A few hours later Israel launched the strongest wave of attacks on Lebanon since the start of the war. In response, Iranian media later said that Iran paused Hormuz traffic over Israeli attacks in Lebanon. The Lebanese government denounced what occurred as a war crime. The IRGC warned of a 'regretful response' if the attacks on Lebanon do not stop.

By 9 April 2026, there was no sign that the agreement to lift the Iranian blockade of Strait of Hormuz was being implemented, ships once again being prevented from moving through the Strait, and Israel and the United States being accused by Iran of violating the ceasefire with the recent attacks in Lebanon. However, no new attacks were reported in the Gulf that day either. Indian media sources reported that the Pakistan Air Force had mobilised its JF-17 and F-16 fighters, as well as IL-78 tankers and C-130 cargo planes. The fighters are expected to fly an escort mission for the Iranian representatives and the PAF set up a protective shield over Iran and the Persian Gulf for the Iranian delegation to travel to Islamabad. Iranian aircraft were also escorted by AEWACS, JF-17s and J-10C aircraft and flew with their transponders switched off. According to one report, Iran lost track of mines it planted in the Strait of Hormuz, and it was therefore unable to fully open the Strait. The US began a naval operation to clear the Strait from mines.

== Responses ==
=== Iran ===
==== Government ====
Iran delivered its response to the United States via Pakistan rejecting a temporary ceasefire and listed their own 10-point proposal, which includes a solution to all regional conflicts, lifting of sanctions, reconstruction, and a protocol to re-open the Strait of Hormuz. Iranian Ambassador to Pakistan, Reza Amiri-Moghaddam said on X (formerly Twitter) that the talks reached a "critical, sensitive stage". Iranian parliamentary speaker Mohammad Bagher Ghalibaf said that the agreement had been violated, and argued that "a bilateral ceasefire or negotiations is unreasonable." On 9 April, he said that "time is running out" for the ceasefire to be viable.

Following the implementation of the ceasefire, a written statement in the name of Mojtaba Khamenei was read on state-run television saying saying to stop firing for the time being, with another message promising revenge. Mohammad Eslami said that any attempt to limit Iran's enrichment of uranium would fail. According to Pakistani sources Iran was about to retaliate on the night between 8 and 9 April against Israeli violations of the ceasefire in Lebanon, however, Pakistani diplomatic efforts managed to hold back such response. Hamid-Reza Haji Babaee, Deputy Speaker of the Iranian Parliament, said that he has faith in the military but not in the negotiations.

==== Iranian public ====
A pro-government rally was held in Tehran in celebration of the ceasefire. Iran International reported that the announcement of the ceasefire drew mixed reactions from the Iranian opposition, with some expressing outrage and despair, feeling that Trump abandoned them and left the country in a worse state than it was before the war began. Others urged patience and expressed a sense of hope that regime change may still happen. Hossein Shariatmadari said that the US cannot be trusted, and argued that any ceasefire would be used by the US to prepare for the next round of attacks. A group of hackers connected to Iran said it would pause cyber-attacks against the US following the ceasefire.

=== United States ===
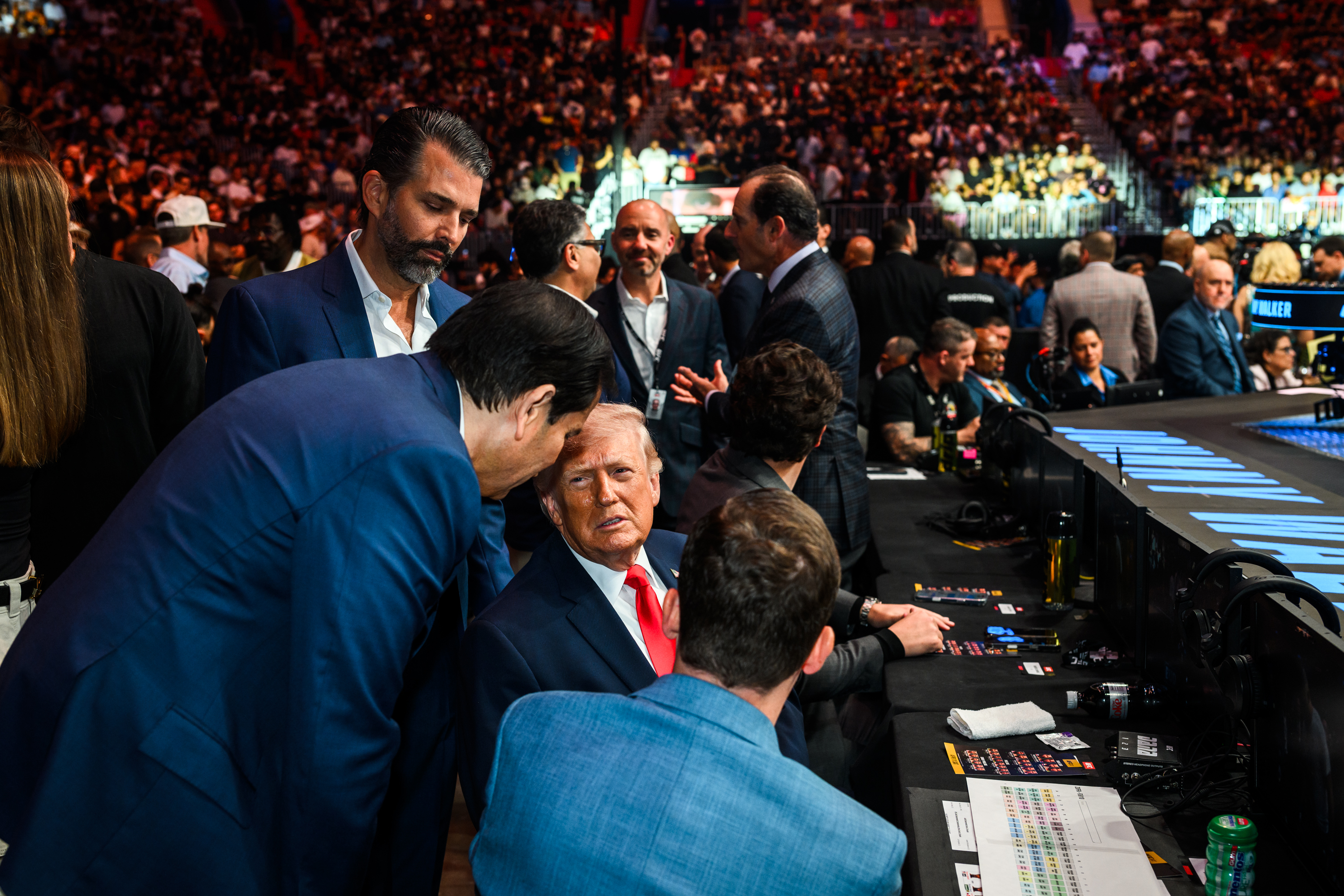
US President Donald Trump and Secretary of State Marco Rubio in attendance of an UFC fight event in Miami, Florida. He told reporters the same day that he did not care about the outcome of the Islamabad Talks, which involved JD Vance.

President Donald Trump said that Vance, Witkoff, and former senior presidential adviser Jared Kushner are talking to intermediaries in Pakistan on ending the war. He also called the Iran proposal a "significant step" ahead of his Tuesday deadline for Iran to reopen the Strait of Hormuz. Earlier on 7 April, Trump warned that "a whole civilization will die tonight" and will "never be brought back" if Iran does not agree to a deal by midnight (GMT). Later during the day, amidst a two-week ceasefire plan by Pakistan, White House Press Secretary Karoline Leavitt stated that Trump was made aware of the plan. Additionally, it was reported by CBS News that Vance would serve as the US interlocutor in the ceasefire talks. On 8 April, Trump threatened to impose a 50% tariff on any country 'supplying military weapons to Iran.' Also on 8 April, Trump threatened that if no deal is reached by Wednesday when the ceasefire expires, the fighting may resume. On 21 April, Trump said that Iran has violated the ceasefire "numerous times."

At an 8 April press conference, Trump said the US will work closely with Iran, talking about the tariff, sanctions and relief. In regard to the Iranian uranium, he stated: "There will be no enrichment of Uranium, and the United States will, working with Iran, dig up and remove all of the deeply buried (B-2 Bombers) Nuclear 'Dust.'" He later added that Lebanon is not included in the ceasefire agreement and that Hezbollah will need to be dealt with: Yeah, they [Lebanon] were not included in the deal . . Because of Hezbollah. They were not included in the deal. That'll get taken care of too. It's alright". JD Vance on the same day stated that the ceasefire was actually a "fragile truce". Leavitt confirmed Chinese involvement in truce negotiations with Iran.

On 11 April 2026, US Vice President JD Vance with President Trump's special envoy, Steve Witkoff, and son-in-law, Jared Kushner, arrived in Islamabad for peace talks with Iranian officials. The Iranian delegation, which includes Foreign Minister Abbas Araghchi and the speaker of Iran's Parliament Mohammad Bagher Ghalibaf arrived there earlier. On 12 April, Vance left Pakistan, saying that the negotiations had not led to an agreement. Trump told reporters the same day that he did not care about the outcome of the negotiations, instead choosing to spend time at a Ultimate Fighting Championship UFC event with Secretary of State Marco Rubio in Miami, Florida. Following the failure of negotiations, Trump threatened a "full naval blockade" on Iran. The United States Central Command (CENTCOM) announced that the naval blockade would begin on Monday at 10 a.m. EDT which is 5:30 p.m. in Iran. The blockade will be against any vessels that originate or are destined for Iranian ports. Officials clarified that any ships without departure or arrival destinations in Iranian ports will be free to transit the Strait of Hormuz.

On 11 April, Trump said that American forces has started "clearing" the Strait of Hormuz. Iran claimed that an American vessel on way to the strait turned backed after warning. The Wall Street Journal reported that several US Navy destroyers entered the Strait of Hormuz for the first time since the war began. A US official described the event as an "operation that focused on freedom of navigation through International waters”. Iranian government reportedly threatened to attack the ships, accusing US of ceasefire violation. US CENTCOM said the ships are taking part in mine clearance operations.

JD Vance announced that the talks between the US and Iran had failed, as he was unable to reach an agreement after a day of negotiations. Afterwards, Trump declared a naval blockade on the Strait of Hormuz, announcing that the US Navy will prevent ships from entering or exiting the Strait and intercept vessels that have paid tolls to Iran. US CENTCOM announced that the blockade will be enforced on vessels of all nations entering or departing Iranian ports and coastal areas but "will not impede freedom of navigation for vessels transiting the Strait of Hormuz to and from non-Iranian ports." The IRGC Navy said that any military vessel approaching the strait would be considered a ceasefire violation and would meet a "severe response."

On 21 April, US Senator Lindsey Graham praised the decision to leave the naval blockade in place, saying that it will be a source of pressure for the Iranian government. He also set out strict conditions for any potential agreement with Iran.

On 12 May, ahead of his state visit to China, Trump was asked by a reporter about the extent to which he cared about Americans' financial situations while in negotiations with Iran. He responded, "Not even a little bit. The only thing that matters when I’m talking about Iran — they can't have a nuclear weapon. I don’t think about Americans’ financial situation. I don't think about anybody. I think about one thing — we cannot let Iran have a nuclear weapon. That's all." He later told Fox News in an interview regarding his previous statement, "That's a perfect statement. I'd make it again."

On 25 May, Trump said that any peace agreement with Iran must be tied to the Abraham Accords, stating that it "should be mandatory" for Saudi Arabia, Qatar, and Pakistan to establish diplomatic ties with Israel, in addition to Egypt, Jordan, and Turkey, which already have ties with Israel.

On 1 June, following the shutdown of further talks by Iran due to planned Israeli attacks on Beirut, he told CNBC that he did not care and claimed that the negotiation process "started to get very boring". Later the same day, he claimed to have a "very productive call" with Netanyahu and Hezbollah to pause attacks on each other and reenable US talks with Iran.

=== Pakistan ===
On 8 April, amidst the deadline set by Trump, Pakistani Prime Minister Shehbaz Sharif called on Trump to extend his deadline for Iran to reopen the Strait of Hormuz by two weeks. It was also reported by CBS, quoting Pakistani sources, that a ceasefire with Iran was being negotiated by Sharif. Later that day, Prime Minister Sharif announced on social media that "...Islamic Republic of Iran and the United States of America, along with their allies, have agreed to an immediate ceasefire everywhere including Lebanon and elsewhere, EFFECTIVE IMMEDIATELY..." while also lauding both parties for their diplomacy. In a 10 April social media post, Pakistani Defense Minister Khawaja Asif called Israel "evil and a curse for humanity" while accusing Israel of genocide against Lebanon. The Israeli Prime Minister's Office responded, "This is not a statement that can be tolerated from any government, especially not from one that claims to be a neutral arbiter for peace". Asif later deleted the post.

=== Israel ===
Prime Minister Benjamin Netanyahu welcomed the decision to halt the strikes on Iran, but insisted that the ceasefire does not apply to the Lebanon war, contradicting Shehbaz Sharif's announcement. Netanyahu also asserted that the ceasefire was "not the end" of the military campaign against Iran, saying that "it is a stop on the way to achieving all of our objectives", which will be achieved "either by agreement, or by resuming the fighting". An advisor to Netanyahu said that Israel and the US were in "complete agreement" about current tensions. Israel's diaspora affairs minister and Likud party member Amichai Chikli called the ceasefire a "mistake", saying that "countries like these, the Japanese Empire, Nazi Germany, you need to bring them to their knees".

A 13 April poll conducted by the Hebrew University of Jerusalem found that most members of the Israeli public oppose the ceasefire, with 63 percent believing that the ceasefire does not extend to Lebanon, when asked what Israel should do about Iran, 39 percent said Israel should continue attacks, 41 percent said their country should respect the ceasefire. On 29 May, a report suggested that Netanyahu and his inner political circle were privately disgruntled with Trump over his alleged subversions and cancelations of Israeli plans to topple the Iranian government and viewed the concept of an emerging American agreement with Iran as "disastrous".

=== International ===
==== Nations ====
- Bahrain: Bahrain called for a lasting solution that will prevent Iran from getting nuclear weapons or from doing things that could destabilize the region.
- France: President Emmanuel Macron said that he remained concerned about the "critical" situation in Lebanon, after Israel continued its strikes and occupation of southern Lebanon after the ceasefire, stating that this "cannot be a long-term solution." France also looked forward to securing shipping through the Strait of Hormuz.
- Germany: Germany urged Iran to respect the ceasefire and to allow ships to cross the Strait of Hormuz safely and freely. They also urged Iran to take advantage of the opportunity for negotiations.
- India: The Indian Ministry for External Affairs welcomed the US-Iran ceasefire agreement and called for an early end to the conflict for "unimpeded" trade flow through the Strait of Hormuz.
- Iraq: The Iraqi oil ministry said on 9 April that no Iraqi ships had crossed the Strait since the ceasefire came into effect.
- Kuwait: Kuwait's foreign ministry urged Iran and its "proxies, including factions, militias, and armed groups loyal to it" to cease all hostilities against Gulf Arab states.
- Qatar: Qatar's foreign ministry considered the ceasefire "an initial step toward de-escalation" and hoped Iran would "cease all hostile acts and practices that undermine regional stability."
- Russia: Russia welcomed the ceasefire and expressed hope that the United States would be able to resume peace negotiations in the Russo-Ukrainian war.
- Spain: Prime Minister Pedro Sánchez said that "the momentary relief cannot make us forget the chaos, the destruction, and the lives lost", adding that Spain "will not applaud those who set the world on fire just because they show up with a bucket."
- United Arab Emirates: The UAE called for a plan to deal with Iran's ballistic missiles and nuclear program. Sultan Al Jaber, head of the state oil company said that the Strait of Hormuz is not open and needs to be open unconditionally.
- United Kingdom: Prime Minister Keir Starmer welcomed the ceasefire and said it would "bring a moment of relief to the region and the world."

==== Supernational organisations ====
- European Union: President of the European Commission Ursula von der Leyen welcomed the ceasefire as "it brings much-needed de-escalation." EU leaders issued a statement welcoming the ceasefire and calling for Lebanon to be included.
- United Nations: Secretary-General António Guterres welcomed the ceasefire and called on all parties to comply with their obligations under international law and abide by the terms of the ceasefire to achieve a lasting peace in the region.

== Violations ==
=== Israel ===
Israel and the United States state that Lebanon was not included in the ceasefire; Pakistani (the mediators) and Iranian authorities state it was.

==== 8 April ====
Despite Hezbollah claiming no attacks against Israel, Israel continued airstrikes across southern Lebanon, the southern suburbs of Beirut and the eastern Beqaa Valley in what was dubbed "Operation Eternal Darkness". In the span of just 10 minutes, 100 airstrikes were launched in Lebanon by Israel during the operation (10 every minute), targeting Hezbollah assets including headquarters, intelligence centers, missile infrastructure, sites related to the Radwan Force and aerial and naval units. Israel stated they had managed to kill Ali Yusuf Harshi, the secretary of Hezbollah's leader at the time. After that, Israel continued fighting. At Iran, authorities claimed for some Israeli violations on their country according to reports. Reports of strikes nearby Tehran and Isfahan were reported. An Israeli drone was allegedly shot down in the vicinity of the city of Lar.

==== 9 April ====
The Israeli airstrikes in Southern Lebanon continued. Hezbollah fired rockets from Lebanon at northern Israel. At around 17:00 Israel Daylight Time, The Jerusalem Post reported that the 98th Division of the IDF had almost fully taken control of all of the town of Bint Jbeil in southern Lebanon. The clashes that ensued would later transform in a full-fledged battle for the city. US President Donald Trump told NBC News that Israel will be "scaling back" its attacks on Lebanon to help support upcoming negotiations between the Iran and the US. Israeli Prime Minister Benjamin Netanyahu instructed his cabinet to begin direct negotiations with Lebanon for peace agreement and demilitarization of Hezbollah. Iran continued to say Israeli attacks "blatantly violate" the ceasefire. A senior Israeli official told Channel 12 that Israel is open to negotiations, but they will take place without a ceasefire. Israel kept striking Hezbollah in Lebanon in a new wave of strikes during the night.

==== 10 April ====
In the early hours of the day, Israel conducted airstrikes on Lebanon.

=== Unverified parties ===
==== 8 April ====
In Iran, the Lavan Oil Refinery, located on Lavan Island was struck at around 10 a.m.; a fire ignited. The Iranian authorities denounced the event and stated that it was an act of "cowardice" by the "enemies". Israel denied being involved in the attack. The debris of a drone shot down by Iranian forces killed a 7-year-old child and injured another six members of the child's family in the town of Shushtar in Khuzestan province.

==== 9 April ====
At 25NM south of Kish Island, a container vessel was struck by an unknown projectile.

=== Iran and Axis of Resistance ===
==== 8 April ====
The Gulf states, including Kuwait, the United Arab Emirates, Bahrain, Iraq and Saudi Arabia reported intercepting missiles throughout the day, with a fire starting in Abu Dhabi’s Habshan gas complex and on an important Saudi pipeline being directly hit by a drone. Since 8 a.m. Arabia Standard Time (UTC+03:00), Kuwait faced 28 Iranian drone attacks and the UAE had faced 35 drone attacks, causing extensive damage. Later in the day, Qatar also confirmed they had intercepted seven missiles and drones. Iranian state television confirmed the attacks, reporting they were carried out in response to the bombing of Iranian oil facilities. Iranian-allied groups in Iraq hit a diplomatic support centre at the Baghdad International Airport during the ceasefire, prompting the US embassy to warn its citizens in the region against further possible attacks and to avoid air travel.

==== 9 April ====
Hezbollah said that it had halted attacks on Israel and on Israeli soldiers in Lebanon. However, in the early hours of the day, it claimed responsibility for a rocket attack on northern Israel, stating that attacks would continue until Israel stopped striking Lebanese territories, regardless of the ceasefire. Hezbollah struck Kiryat Shmona, Taibe, and Manara. Despite the agreement to open the Strait of Hormuz, it remains "effectively closed", with Iran limiting the number of ships that can cross and charging tolls of over $1 million per ship, or even $1 million per barrel. Only four ships carrying dry cargo (and thus not oil or gas tankers) managed to pass through Hormuz on the first day of the truce, with the daily average being of nine ships during the war. Drones attacked vital infrastructure in Kuwait, prompting the country to respond by fending them off.

==== 10 April ====
At midnight (local time), Hezbollah launched a rocket attack on the border town of Metula. Later on, sirens were heard in Tel Aviv, Haifa, and Ashdod in response to an incoming Hezbollah strike. Trump accused Iran of doing a "very poor job" in its handling of oil passing through the pivotal Strait of Hormuz, arguing it was "not the agreement we have". By 10 March 2026 only 15 ships made it through the Strait of Hormuz.

==== 13 April ====
The United States imposed a naval blockade on Iran on Iran following the failure of the Islamabad Talks to end the war. Iran said it will view the entry of military vessels near the strait as a breach of the ceasefire and will respond accordingly.

==== 14 April ====
Several Iranian attack drones entered Iraqi Kurdistan's airspace, striking a camp used by the exiled Iranian Kurdish militant group Komala. Three Komala fighters were injured.

==== 16 April ====
It was reported that since the implementation of the ceasefire, Iraqi Kurdistan has been hit by 16 missile and drone attacks.

==== 7 June ====
Iran launched ballistic missiles at Israel in response to Israeli airstrikes on Beirut's southern suburbs. The attack marked Iran's first direct missile strike against Israel since the April 2026 ceasefire. Iranian officials stated that the attack was carried out in retaliation for the Israeli strike, and claimed that the Ramat David Airbase was among the intended targets. They also warned of further action if attacks on Lebanon continued. The Israel Defense Forces said that no immediate casualties or damage were reported.

=== United States ===
==== 19 April ====
President Trump announced that the US had attacked the Iran-flagged cargo ship Touska after it attempted to breach the US naval blockade of Iran, blowing a hole in its engine room and taking the ship into custody. The vessel, almost 900 feet (270 m) long, was en route to Bandar Abbas. It was warned by the USS Spruance over a six-hour period before the destroyer fired several rounds from its 5-inch/54-caliber Mark 45 gun into the engine room, disabling it. It was then seized by the 31st Marine Expeditionary Unit in the Gulf of Oman. Iran described the seizure as a truce violation.

==== 7 May ====
On 7 May, Khatam al-Anbiya Central Headquarters spokesperson Ebrahim Zolfaghari accused the United States of violating the ceasefire after it targeted two ships at the Strait of Hormuz and strikes in the Hormozgan province including Bandar Khamir, Sirik, and Qeshm Island. He also confirmed that Iran responded by attacking U.S. military vessels east of the waterway and south of Chabahar port. The U.S. Central Command stated that the military carried out "self-defense" strikes against military facilities in response to attacks on the USS Truxtun, USS Rafael Peralta, and USS Mason as the three ships were transiting the Strait of Hormuz into the Gulf of Oman.

==== 25 May ====
On 25 May, US forces launched several strikes, targeting sites including "missile launch sites and Iranian boats attempting to emplace mines" in Bandar Abbas, in the name of "self-defense" to protect US soldiers from threats by Iranian forces, according to spokesperson of the United States Central Command, Tim Hawkins. Hawkins also stated that the military "continues to defend our forces while using restraint during the ongoing ceasefire". Several Iranian soldiers were reportedly killed. According to Iranian sources, prior to the US attacks, the Iranian military targeted a ship at sea.

== Aftermath ==
Following the April ceasefire, some low intensity fighting between US and Iranian forces did take place. However, Trump decided to arrive at a more comprehensive ceasefire that would lead to an US-Iranian agreement. As a result, new ceasefire conditions for a period of 60 days were agreed upon on June 12, with the presidents of the US and Iran signing on 17 June a memorandum of understanding to end the war, which established a 60-day extension of the ceasefire to negotiate the final terms of a deal.

== See also ==
- Islamabad Memorandum
- Twelve-Day War ceasefire − similar ceasefire in 2025
- Pakistan in the 2026 Iran war
