= Islamabad Talks =

2026 diplomatic negotiations between the U.S. and Iran in Pakistan

- Part of the 2025–2026 Iran–United States negotiations and the 2026 Iran war ceasefire
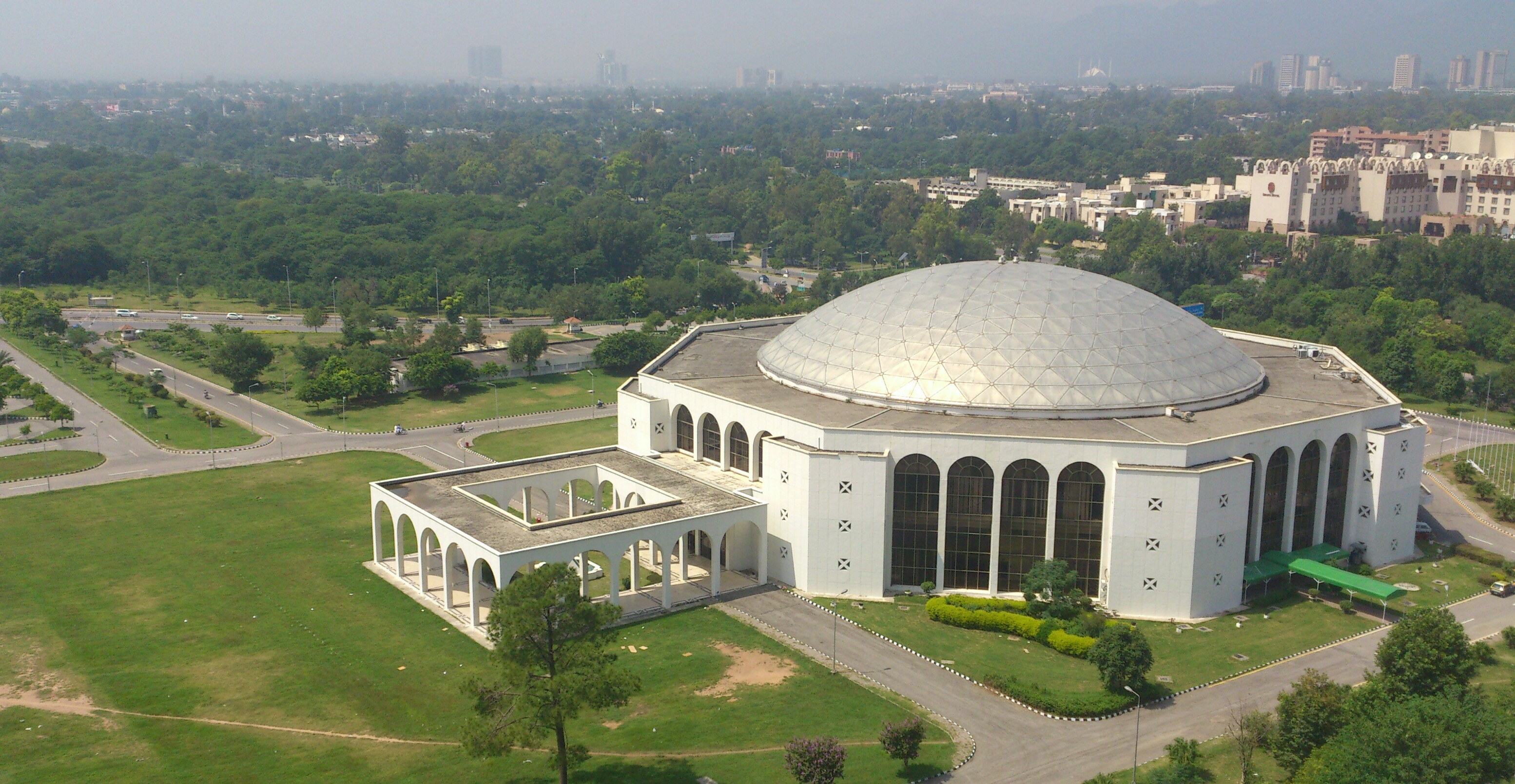
- The Jinnah Convention Centre was designated the 'Media Facilitation Centre'; the talks themselves were held at the Serena Hotel (right background)
- Native name: اسلام آباد مذاکرات, Islāmābād mazakarat
- Date: 11–12 April 2026 (Note: The talks began on Saturday afternoon and concluded on Sunday after 21 hours.)
- Venue: Islamabad Serena Hotel
- Location: Islamabad, Pakistan
- Type: Diplomatic negotiations
- Motive: To end the 2026 Iran war; To reopen the Strait of Hormuz; To ensure long-term peace and stability in the Middle East
- Organised by: Government of Pakistan
- Participants: Iran; Pakistan; United States
- Outcome: Talks failed to reach an agreement; a second round of talks is likely; see outcome: Naval blockade of Iran; Islamabad Memorandum

The Islamabad Talks, also known as the Islamabad Peace Talks, were held in Islamabad, Pakistan, on 11 and 12 April 2026. Aimed at stabilizing the 2026 Iran war ceasefire and negotiating a potential resolution to the war, the talks were moderated by Pakistan, which played a central role in brokering the ceasefire and facilitating the talks.

The 300-member U.S. negotiating team was led by Vice President JD Vance, alongside special envoys Steve Witkoff and Jared Kushner; while the 70-member Iranian team was led by parliamentary speaker Mohammad Bagher Ghalibaf, alongside foreign minister Abbas Araghchi. The Pakistani mediating team was led by prime minister Shehbaz Sharif, field marshal Asim Munir, and deputy prime minister and foreign minister Ishaq Dar. The talks lasted 21 hours between 11 and 12 April 2026, and consisted of three rounds with the first one being indirect and the second and third ones being direct. The day of the meeting, Trump told reporters that he did not care about whether an agreement would come out of the talks.

The teams were reportedly able to agree on the main points of the 10-points ceasefire, with the exception of the issues regarding the Strait of Hormuz and the Iranian nuclear program. The talks ended with no agreement reached, and no memorandum of understanding (MoU) being issued. Following the failure of the talks, U.S. president Donald Trump imposed a naval blockade on Iran on 13 April, interdicting any ships entering or departing Iranian ports.

The United States and Iran reached a final agreed-upon text for a peace deal to end the war on 12 June 2026. On 17 June, Donald Trump and Iranian president Masoud Pezeshkian signed remotely the memorandum of understanding to end the war, which established a 60-day extension of the ceasefire to negotiate the final terms of a deal.

== Background ==
On 28 February 2026, Israel and the United States launched an air war against Iran, killing its supreme leader and many other officials. Iran responded with missile and drone strikes against Israel, US bases, and US-allied countries in the Middle East, and by closing the Strait of Hormuz, disrupting global trade.

US president Donald Trump wrote on 6 March 2026 that there will be no deal with Iran except its unconditional surrender. On 9 March, Trump said that "the war is very complete, pretty much", and claimed that the Iranian military had been destroyed and the Strait of Hormuz had re-opened. On 15 March he demanded that NATO and China help the US to re-open the strait. Trump again claimed on 24 March that the US and Israel had "won" the war, even though Iran continued its missile strikes. In late March, Trump repeatedly threatened to destroy Iran's infrastructure if it did not make a "deal" with the US and re-open the Hormuz strait.

Trump said on 23 March that the US has been speaking to "a top person" in Iran and claimed "They called, I didn't call. They want to make a deal, and we are very willing to make a deal". The IRGC-affiliated Fars News denied there had been any negotiations with Trump. The Iranian foreign ministry said it was merely reviewing proposals from the US sent through mediators.

On 25 March, Pakistani officials delivered a "15-point proposal" from the US to Iran, detailing a ceasefire plan. The US proposal included an end to Iran's nuclear program, limits on its missiles, reopening the Strait of Hormuz, restrictions on Iran's support for armed groups, and sanctions relief for Iran. The Iranians rejected the US proposal, with an anonymous official telling Press TV that "Iran will end the war when it decides to do so and when its own conditions are met". The Iranians issued a "5-point counter-proposal", including an end to US-Israeli attacks on Iran and pro-Iranian forces in Lebanon and Iraq, security guarantees to prevent future Israeli and US aggression, war reparations, and international recognition of Iranian sovereignty over the Strait of Hormuz.

On 31 March, Pakistan delivered a "5 point initiative" for peace, calling for an immediate end to all hostilities and allowance of humanitarian aid into the region. Trump claimed on 1 April 2026 that Iran had just asked the US for a ceasefire and that the US would consider it once the Strait of Hormuz was "open, free, and clear. Until then, we are blasting Iran into oblivion ... back to the Stone Ages!". Iran's foreign ministry called the claim "false and baseless". The IRGC said the strait "will not be opened to the enemies of this nation through the ridiculous spectacle by the president of the US".

On 8 April 2026, (Note: The ceasefire was announced and came into effect on 8 April in the Middle East, where the fighting was happening; this was 7 April in the US.) the United States and Iran agreed to a two-week ceasefire in the 2026 Iran war, mediated by Pakistan.

== Preparations ==
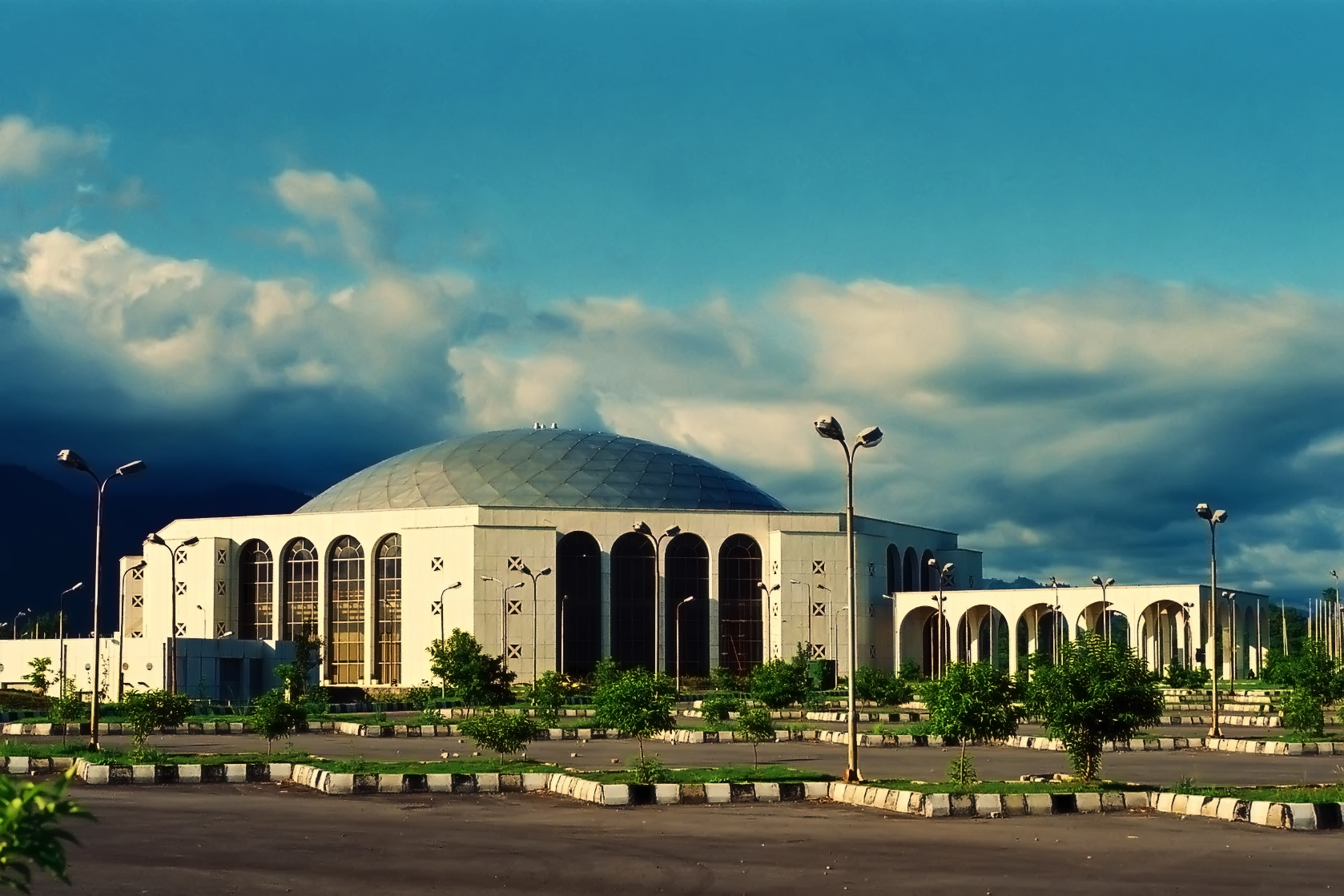
Jinnah Convention Centre was designated as Media Facilitation Centre.

On 8 April, authorities in Islamabad declared public holidays for 9 and 10 April in the federal capital to facilitate the upcoming talks. Government offices and educational institutions were ordered to remain closed, while essential services such as police, hospitals, and utilities continued to operate.

Extensive security measures were implemented across the capital, with reports indicating the deployment of more than 10,000 police and security personnel, supported by paramilitary forces and military coordination. The city was placed on high alert, with strict restrictions on movement and heightened surveillance in key areas.

The Serena Hotel in Islamabad, located within the heavily secured Red Zone near key government buildings and foreign embassies, was requisitioned to host the delegations. Guests were asked to vacate the premises ahead of the talks, and the facility was designated as the primary venue for negotiations. The Red Zone was sealed, and multiple entry points into Islamabad were closed as part of a wider security cordon. Authorities also implemented traffic diversion plans across major roads, including the Express Highway, advising residents to adjust travel plans due to expected disruptions.

According to officials, the security arrangements included coordination between Islamabad Police, Punjab Police, Rangers, and other security agencies to ensure protection for visiting delegations and control movement across the capital. The government also introduced facilitation measures for international media, including visa-on-arrival arrangements for foreign journalists covering the talks and shuttle transport services between designated media area, Jinnah Convention Centre, and Serena Hotel.

== Participants ==
The negotiations involved senior political, diplomatic, and security officials from both countries.

The United States delegation of nearly 300 members was led by Vice President JD Vance and included senior officials such as special envoy Steve Witkoff and presidential adviser Jared Kushner. According to a senior official cited by BBC News, the broader delegation also included National Security Adviser Andrew Baker and Asian affairs adviser Michael Vance. Additional subject-matter experts were present in Islamabad, with further support teams based in Washington, D.C.

The Iranian delegation consisted of around 70 members, led by parliamentary speaker Mohammad Bagher Ghalibaf and Foreign Minister Abbas Araghchi, along with additional political, security, and economic officials. The reported members included:

- Mohammad Bagher Ghalibaf – Speaker of the Parliament (head of delegation)
- Abbas Araghchi – Foreign Minister
- Reza Amiri Moghadam – Ambassador to Pakistan
- Ali Akbar Ahmadian – Member of the Supreme National Security Council
- Ali Bagheri Kani – Deputy to the Supreme National Security Council
- Esmail Ahmadi Moghadam – President of the National Defence University
- Mohammad Jafari – Assistant to the Secretary at the Supreme National Security Council
- Abdolnaser Hemmati – Central Bank Governor
- Kazem Gharibabadi – Deputy Foreign Minister
- Majid Takht-Ravanchi – Deputy Foreign Minister
- Valiollah Nouri – Deputy Foreign Minister
- Esmail Baghaei – Deputy Foreign Minister and Foreign Ministry spokesperson
- Abolfazl Amouei – Member of Parliament
- Mohammad Nabavian – Member of Parliament

Pakistani leadership, including Prime Minister Shehbaz Sharif, Foreign Minister Ishaq Dar and Chief of Defense Forces Asim Munir, facilitated the negotiations and acted as intermediaries. On 11 April, it was reported that amid the negotiations, high-ranking senior IRGC officials arrived in Pakistan to provide "consultation" to the Iranian delegation.

== Significance ==
The Islamabad Talks represented the first instance of direct high-level, in-person engagement between the United States and Iran since the 1979 Islamic revolution. They were widely regarded as a critical diplomatic effort to prevent further escalation and stabilize the region. The outcome of the talks, regardless of the case, was expected to have significant implications for regional security, global energy markets, and international diplomatic relations. Pakistan's unlikely rise as a mediator in the conflict led to notice and discussion.

== Reactions ==
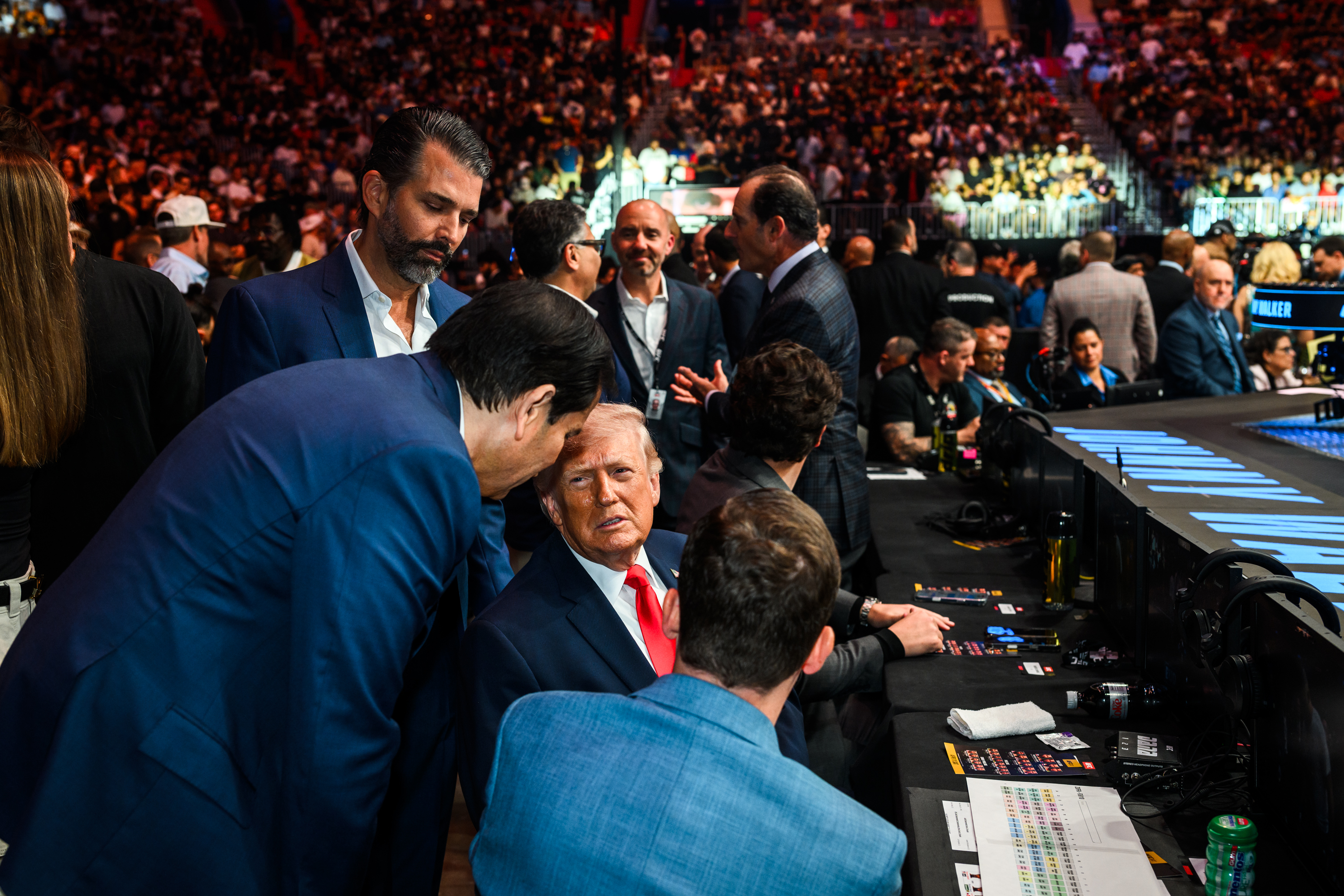
US president Donald Trump and Secretary of State Marco Rubio in attendance of a UFC fight event in Miami, Florida at the same time that the talks in Islamabad occurred. Just before the negotiation round, Trump told reporters that he did not care whether a deal was to be made or not.

Russia called for restraint from all parties involved in the Islamabad talks, urging them to adopt a "responsible approach" and avoid actions that could undermine the negotiations. In a statement reported by TASS, the Russian Foreign Ministry said the talks represent an opportunity to advance a settlement of the crisis in the Gulf region. The ministry added that most countries support the diplomatic process and expressed hope for the success of the United States–Iran talks being held in Islamabad under Pakistani mediation. It also noted concerns that "forces" may be attempting to slow or obstruct progress toward peace.

France expressed support for the Islamabad talks and called for de-escalation. President Emmanuel Macron said that he had urged Iranian president Masoud Pezeshkian to use the negotiations to achieve a "lasting de-escalation" and work toward a broader agreement ensuring regional security. Macron also emphasized the need for Iran to restore freedom of navigation in the Strait of Hormuz as part of efforts to stabilize the region.

Hamas welcomed the Islamabad talks, expressing support for efforts aimed at ending the conflict. In a statement reported by Al Jazeera, the group said it backed negotiations "aimed at a complete and comprehensive end" to the war involving the United States and its allies. The statement also expressed hope for the success of Pakistan’s mediation efforts, stating that positive outcomes could contribute to regional stability and unity among Arab and Islamic countries.

European lawmaker Hannah Neumann said that during the ceasefire, the repression within Iran is getting worse, and criticized that diplomatic efforts have not included the rights of Iranian people.

US senator Bill Cassidy said that the ongoing talks with Iran were to make sure that they would not be able to develop a nuclear weapon.

Ahead of the negotiation process, Trump told reporters that the outcome of the negotiations did not matter to him because his country supposedly defeated Iran militarily already. The same night that the negotiations were occurring, he was at an Ultimate Fighting Championship (UFC) fight event with Secretary of State Marco Rubio; it is unknown whether Trump knew of the negative outcome of the negotiation round at the time. In a later congressional hearing, senator Jacky Rosen told Rubio that she was shocked to see that Rubio, as secretary of state, chose to accompany Trump for a party at the UFC instead of taking part in talks with Iran during the Islamabad talks with Vance. The day after the Islamabad and UFC events ended, Trump announced that he would immediately enact a naval blockade against Iran.

In late April, after the first round of talks had already concluded, Iranian representatives wouldn't arrive for the anticipated second round of talks expected later in the month. Explaining the Iranian decision, an Iranian national security spokesperson, Ebrahim Rezaei, said "Pakistan is a good friend and neighbor of ours, but it is not a suitable intermediary for negotiations and lacks the necessary credibility for mediation." He claimed that Pakistan would always take Trump's interests into account and often overlook his violation of agreements. "A mediator must be impartial, not always leaning to one side," Rezaei stated.

On 21 April, German foreign minister Johann Wadephul said that Iran should engage in talks with the US "for the people's sake".

Vahid Ahmadi, a member of the Iranian parliament's national security commission, said that if the US did not accept Iran's demands, they would continue the war. A senior Iranian source said that Iran was not open to discussing its missile program.

Chancellor of Germany Friedrich Merz stated that Iranian leaders have "humiliated" US leaders by making them travel to Islamabad and returning back with no result.

US senator Lindsey Graham stated that he didn't trust Pakistan with the negotiations due to reports that an Iranian military aircraft was sheltered during the talks. He remarked, "No wonder this damn thing is going nowhere." He later also remarked that Pakistan's role as a mediator was "problematic" while citing the country's anti Israel stance and its position on Abraham Accords.

== Outcome ==
The talks concluded on 12 April 2026. The negotiations lasted about 21 hours and ended with the United States and Iranian delegations leaving Islamabad without reaching a deal. The main unresolved issues reportedly included Iran's nuclear program and the status of the Strait of Hormuz. Other issues included sanctions relief and frozen assets. While the US side insisted on a phased relief linked to compliance, Iran demanded comprehensive lifting of sanctions and release of assets, including $6 billion in frozen assets, as a precondition to a meaningful deal. Iranian officials said they had not expected an agreement to be reached in a single round of talks and that contacts were expected to continue. Pakistani officials described the talks as part of an effort to preserve the ceasefire and encourage further diplomacy between the parties.

Iran's minister of foreign affairs Abbas Araghchi claimed that they were "inches away from an MoU" and accused the US delegation of moving the goalposts and maximalizing. More broadly, the Iranian delegation believed that Washington had to do more to earn their trust. According to an analysis in Iran International, Iran's diplomacy following the failure of the talks has been to express defiance towards American pressure while leaving the possibility of future diplomacy still open.

Trump claimed that Iran had "knowingly failed" to reopen the Strait of Hormuz, and Vance said that Iran had refused the possibility of not developing nuclear weapons.

According to a senior Pakistani government official cited by CBS News, Pakistan subsequently intensified diplomatic efforts to bring the US and Iran back to the negotiating table. Reports also indicated that Pakistani authorities began referring to the negotiations as part of a broader "Islamabad process", suggesting an effort to frame the engagement as an ongoing diplomatic track rather than a single round of talks. Pakistan remained in contact with both Washington and Tehran following the talks, urging a resumption of dialogue and seeking to facilitate a second round of negotiations before the expiration of the ceasefire in April 2026.

On 14 April, it was reported that US and Iranian teams could be returning to Islamabad for talks to take place later in that week. Trump said on the same day that "we're more inclined to go there [Islamabad]" and that talks in Islamabad were "more likely". However, as of 20 April, it remained unclear if the Iranian side was planning to participate in the next round of talks, and on 21 April it was reported that Iran did not send any representative to the talks. The Institute for the Study of War reported a major disagreement between Iranian parliament speaker Mohammad Bagher Ghalibaf and IRGC commander Ahmad Vahidi, with Ghalibaf favoring participating in negotiations and Vahidi opposing participation. In anticipation of the talks, Pakistan military's Inter-Services Intelligence had sent out a private message on WhatsApp to reporters stating that Araghchi was visiting Islamabad and would meet his american counterparts as "Attributable to Government Sources." Araghchi never went to Islamabad to re-open talks and did not be meet with Witkoff and Kushner as was anticipated. Trump had to call off the trip, saying the Iranians could phone them if they wanted.

In May, anonymous US officials revealed to CBS News that during the initial ceasefire period in early April, Pakistan covertly allowed Iranian military aircraft, including the RC-130, to park on its airfields, including Nur Khan airbase, potentially shielding them from American airstrikes. Trump administration officials also expressed their suspicions that Pakistan was sharing "a more positive version of the Iranian position with the US than what reflects reality" while questioning whether "Trump’s displeasure" was being communicated as aggressively.

On 17 June 2026, the Islamabad Memorandum was signed remotely between the presidents of the US, Donald Trump, and Iran, Masoud Pezeshkian. The memorandum is a 14-point "framework agreement" and provides for an end to military strikes, the reopening of the Strait of Hormuz to commercial shipping toll-free for 60 days, an end to the U.S. naval blockade of Iranian ports, and a 60-day extension of the ceasefire. The memorandum also includes a $300 billion fund for Iran in addition to the release of frozen Iranian assets, as well as sanctions relief. Major issues, however, were not agreed upon in the framework agreement, which contains no accord on Iran's nuclear program or uranium stockpiles, although it does call for the downgrading of Iranian uranium from weapons-grade to reactor-grade following a final agreement. These issues are deferred to future talks to take place over the 60-day ceasefire extension. The framework agreement also does not mention the Iranian ballistic missile program or its network of non-state allies in the Middle East.

Within 25 days of signing the memorandum, Iran’s Ministry of Foreign Affairs accused Washington of violating "nearly all parts" of the agreement citing attacks on transport infrastructure and fishing vessels.

== See also ==
- 2026 Iran war
- Iran–United States relations
- Foreign relations of Pakistan
