= Iran memorandum =

The Iran memorandum may refer to the:

- Islamabad Memorandum between Iran and the United States aimed at ending the 2026 Iran war
- Memorandum of understanding between Argentina and Iran regarding the 1994 AMIA bombing
