= Iran–South Korea relations =

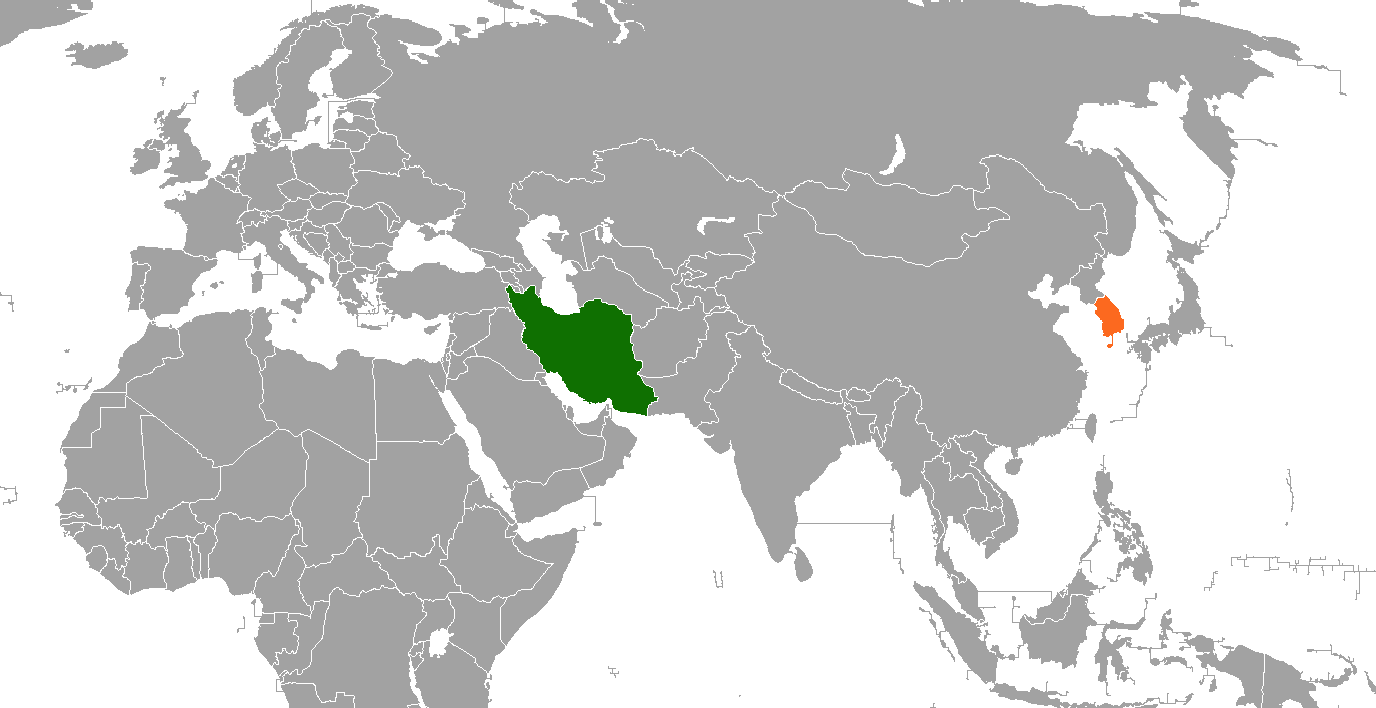

- Iran: South Korea

Iran and South Korea have had diplomatic relations since 1962. Throughout history, the two countries have maintained a normal relationship despite South Korea's close relationship with the United States, and Iran's close relationship with North Korea (making Iran one of the few countries in the world which maintains good relations with both North Korea and South Korea). However, many South Koreans disapprove of Iran's nuclear program and its open alliance with North Korea, sometimes leading the South Korean government to sanction Iran.

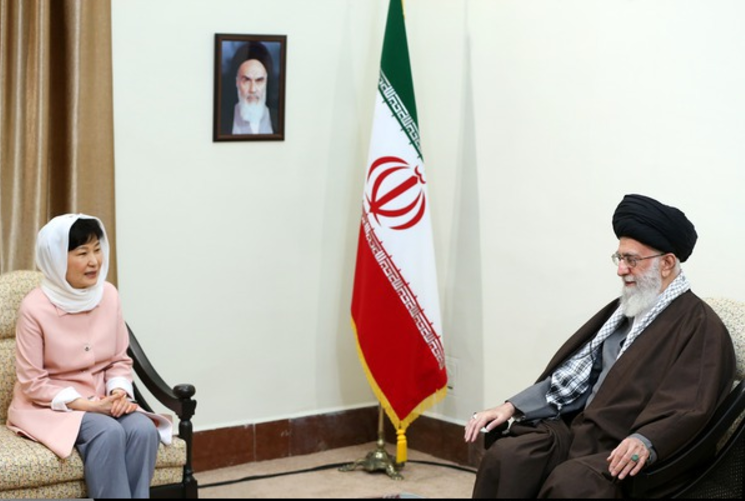
Then president Park Geun-hye And Supreme Leader Ali Khamenei in May 2016.

== Early and ancient history ==
Korea's and Iran's long-running relationship started with cultural exchanges dating back to the Three Kingdoms of Korea era, more than 1,600 years ago, by the way of the Silk Road. A dark blue glass was found in the Cheonma Tomb, one of Silla's royal tombs unearthed in Gyeongju. An exotic golden sword was found in Gyerim-ro, a street also located in Gyeongju. These are all relics that are presumed to be sent to Silla from ancient Iran through the Silk Road. It was only the Goryeo Dynasty during King Hyeongjong's reign when trade with Persia was officially recorded in Korean history. In academic circles, it is presumed that both countries had active cultural exchanges during the 7th century Silla era which means the relationship between Korea and Iran began more than 1500 years ago.

An ancient Persian epic poem, the Kush Nama, contains detailed descriptions of Silla. During a festival celebrating Iran and Korea's 1,500 years of shared cultural ties, president Park Geun-hye said "We have a myth in an ancient Persian book (the Kush Nama) that tells of a Persian prince who went to Silla in the seventh century and got married to a Korean princess, thus forming a royal marriage". She then said, "this is actually quite a good plot for making a film together." Her suggestion was received with a lot of applause.

Other items uncovered during the excavation include a silver bowl engraved with an image of the Persian goddess Anahita; a golden dagger from Persia; clay busts; and figurines portraying Persian merchants. Samguk Sagi—the official chronicle of the Three Kingdoms era, compiled in 1145—contains further descriptions of commercial items sold by Persian merchants and widely used in Silla society. The influence of Persian culture was profoundly felt in other ways as well, most notably in the fields of music, visual arts, and literature. The popularity of Iranian designs in Korea can be seen in the widespread use of pearl-studded roundels and symmetrical, zoomorphic patterns.

== Relations with Imperial Iran ==
South Korea and Iran established relations in August 1962. The Iranian Embassy in South Korea opened in April 1967. In 1977, a street in Seoul was renamed Teheran-ro after Tehran, Iran's capital, while a street in Tehran was renamed Seoul Street, after the South Korean capital.

== List of South Korean ambassadors in Iran ==
Order	Diplomat name	Term
초대	1. 노석찬(盧錫瓚)	1967. 4
제 2대	2. 김종규(金種圭)	1971. 3
제 2대	3. 현시학(玄時學)	1974. 5
제 4대	4. 김동휘(金東輝	1978. 8
제 5대	5. 이창희(李昌熙)	1980. 6
제 6대	6. 심기철(沈基哲)	1980.12
? 공사	강승구(姜勝求)	1982. 9
제 7대	7. 민형기(閔形基)	1985. 6
?	강신성(姜信盛)	1987. 9 (미부임)
제 8대	8. 오정일(吳正一)	1988. 3
제 9대	9. 정경일(鄭慶逸)	1989. 6
제 10대	10. 이상열(李相悅)	1992. 4
제 11대	11. 신성오(辛成梧)	1994. 2
제 12대	12. 김재규(金在珪)	1996. 3
제 13대	13. 신장범(愼長範)	1998. 5
제 14대	14. 이상철(李相哲)	2001. 2
제 15대	15. 백기문(白基文)	2003. 9
제 16대	16. 임홍재(任洪宰)	2005. 9
제 17대	17. 김영목(金永穆)	2007. 10
제 18대	18. 박재현 대사	2010. 8
제 19대	19. 송웅엽 대사	2012. 9
제 20대	20. 김승호 대사	2015. 10 ~ today

== Nuclear program ==
In June 2007, South Korea's then-foreign minister, Song Min-soon, supported a diplomatic solution to the international disagreement over Iran's nuclear program. In November 2008, South Korea's next foreign minister, Yu Myung-hwan, said that Iran needed to reassure the international community of the peaceful nature of its nuclear program. According to UN Secretary General Ban Ki-moon, a South Korean, "the Iranian foreign minister stressed that his country is pushing for a nuclear program for peaceful purposes."

Iran's nuclear program and its alliance with North Korea have been under criticism in South Korea, sometimes negatively affecting relations. South Korea announced sanctions against Iran in 2010 to show its open disapproval.

== Economic relationship ==
While politically not close, Iran and South Korea enjoy much closer economic ties with bilateral trade totaling roughly $10 billion in 2008. Despite disagreements over Iran’'s nuclear enrichment activity, Vice President of the Korea Trade-Investment Promotion Agency Hong Ki-Wha and the head of Iran's Investment and Technical and Economic Assistances Organization, Mohammad Khaza'i, signed a memorandum of understanding in April 2007, in which they agreed to form a committee with the aim of boosting trade between their two countries. Kim Sung Gun, South Korea's parliamentary delegation head to Iran in March 2007 noted that Korean companies are eager to invest in Iran and added that he hopes the two countries can encourage bilateral investment.

According to a Middle East Economic Survey, Iran exported 157,000 barrels of crude oil per day to South Korea in July 2009. Though South Korea has decreased total crude oil imports from the Middle East by 14.7% compared to the previous year, Iran remains South Korea's fourth largest source of crude oil.

In May 2009, South Korean ministers participated in a major conference on foreign investment in Iran. South Korea also attended the Iranian gas forum on September 26–27, 2009 alongside Germany, the United Kingdom, Japan, the Netherlands, and Malaysia.

According to a report by the United States government, as of April 2010 there were three South Korean firms active in Iran's hydrocarbon sector between 2005 and 2009 that received US government contracts totaling roughly $880 million. These were the Daelim Industrial Company, Hyundai Heavy Industries, and GS Engineering and Construction. On July 3, 2010, Iran the National Iranian Oil Company (NIOC) cancelled a $1.2 billion contract with GS Engineering and Construction, accusing the firm of failing to fulfill its obligations. The South Korean company had been tasked with removing hydrogen sulfide from gas pumped from Iran's South Pars gas field after signing an agreement in October 2009.

Iran has about local 2,500 SME trading partners in South Korea. It said that more than 600 out of the 2,500 firms see their ratio of exports to Iran exceed 50 percent.

== Diplomatic and military cooperation ==
South Korea and Iran have continuously disagreed on the latter's nuclear enrichment activities. In January 2007, Ban Ki-moon, South Korea's former foreign minister, assumed the position of UN Secretary General. During his time in office, Ban supported a number of sanctions against the Islamic Republic for failing to comply with the International Atomic Energy Agency, further straining relations between the two countries. Impediments notwithstanding, South Korea and Iran have had a number of official meetings to discuss bilateral trade and political cooperation and have signed several memorandums of understanding, including on media cooperation, trade-investment, and technical cooperation between the two.

During a March 2009 meeting between National Assembly Speaker of South Korea Kim Hyong-o and Iranian Judiciary Chief Ayatollah Hashemi Shahroudi, Kim expressed his hope that Iran and South Korea expand parliamentary cooperation. That same month, the Iranian Deputy Foreign Minister in Asia and Pacific Affairs suggested that Iran and South Korea should cooperate to help establish security in Afghanistan.

In November 2009, Iran announced that it was prepared to aid in resolving the Korean peninsula crisis. Iranian Foreign Minister Manouchehr Mottaki said that Iran welcomed mutual understanding and agreement between South and North Korea to promote peace and stability in the region. During a meeting with South Korean Deputy Foreign Minister Lee Yong-Jon at the end of October 2009, Mottaki said that "mutual cooperation has not been balanced in all fields and we hope to be able to make it more balanced." The South Korean senior diplomat responded that "we want promotion of ties in all economic fields and implementing joint projects and deepening bilateral cooperation in direction of mutual interests."

On 6 January 2010, the head of the Iran–South Korea parliamentary friendship group, Hossein Hashemi, and Speaker Kim Hyong-o met in Seoul in order to discuss ways to foster bilateral cooperation, particularly, in the economic and energy sectors. During the meeting, Kim referred to the ample potentials existing on both sides for increasing mutual cooperation and expressed satisfaction over the growth of bilateral ties between the two countries. On Iran's nuclear issue, he stressed Iran's right to use peaceful nuclear energy, and added "all countries are entitled to use peaceful nuclear energy and we believe Iran's nuclear program is for civilian purposes."

In April 2010, in an effort to improve the two countries' "mutual understanding and acquaintance," South Korea and Iran agreed to exchange news and media teams and enhance current levels of educational and technical collaboration. The decision to expand cooperation in the field of media was taken following a meeting between Islamic Republic News Agency Directory Ali-Akbar Javanfekr and Lee Seung Jung, the head of the South Korea Press Association.

Although "high politics" ties between the two countries are not especially developed, Seoul and Tehran have taken steps to engage each other in cultural spheres. In May 2009, South Korean Vice-Cultural Minister Jae-min Shin and the South Korean Ambassador to Tehran Kim Young-mok attended a ceremony entitled "Korea, Sparkling Night in Iran" where both officials expressed the hope that such events would bring about improved political, economic and cultural relations between South Korea and Iran. In October 2009, South Korea's Busan International Film Festival hosted two Iranian filmmakers, Payment Hagani and Mahmoud Kalari. The Iranian filmmakers will present their films as well as participate in an educational workshop for aspiring Asian directors.

Furthermore, the Iran National Library and Archives (INLA) has agreed to work to increase bilateral cooperation with the National Library of [South] Korea. In March 2010, INLA Director Ali-Akbar Ashari met with his South Korean counterpart, Chul-min Mo, to sign an agreement pledging to exchange experience in staff training and library science, and to hold book fairs.

== Tensions ==
While Iran and South Korea are generally friendly, the two countries nonetheless have had sporadic tensions. In 2020, South Korea decided to freeze all Iranian assets in the country out of fear they could be used to finance the Iranian nuclear program. In response, Iran threatened to take legal action on South Korean goods, leading to the Iranian ambassador being called by Seoul to answer to the perceived threat from Iran.

=== Strait of Hormuz ===
In the 2026 Iran war between the United States and Iran, South Korea summoned the Iran ambassador. This is because a South Korean vessel operated by HMM co. was struck by a projectile in the Strait of Hormuz.

After South Korean officials announced that they planned to send a team to assess the situation in the Strait of Hormuz, dozens of South Koreans protested outside the U.S. Embassy in Seoul on September 9, 2026. They chanted "We cannot send our young people into a sea of death!" and waved signs saying "Do not join a war of aggression."

== See also ==
- Iran–North Korea relations
- Seizure of the Hankuk Chemi
- Teheran-ro
- Seoul Street
