= Islamabad Memorandum =

Proposed peace agreement between the United States and Iran

Islamabad Memorandum of Understanding between the United States of America and the Islamic Republic of Iran
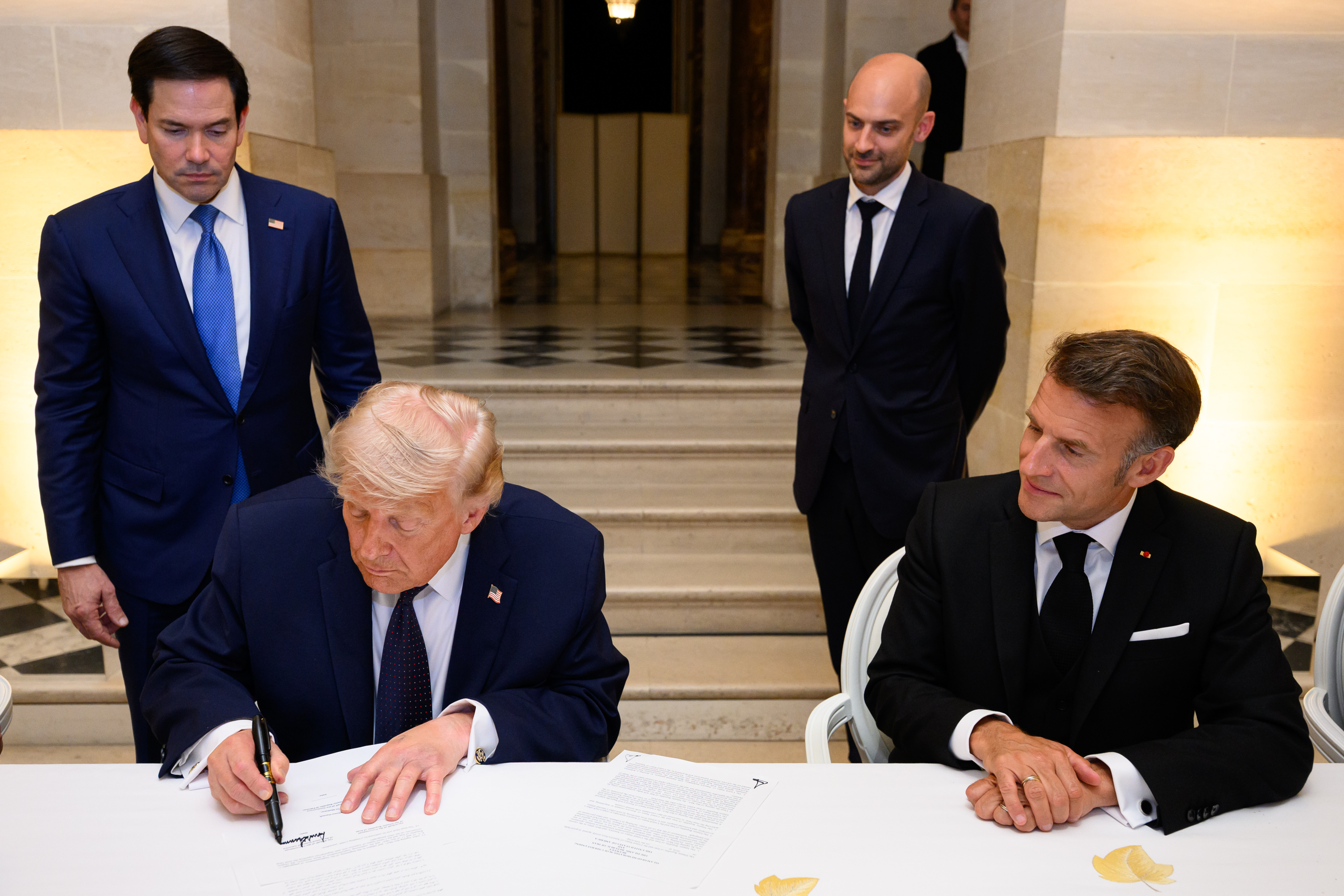
- U.S. president Donald Trump signs the Islamabad Memorandum of Understanding at the Palace of Versailles with US secretary of state Marco Rubio standing behind Trump, French president Emmanuel Macron sitting next to Trump, and the French minister for Europe and foreign affairs, Jean-Noël Barrot, standing behind Macron.
- Type: Memorandum of understanding
- Context: 2025–2026 Iran–United States negotiations and Middle Eastern crisis (2026 Iran war and 2026 Lebanon war)
- Drafted: 14 June 2026
- Signed: 17 June 2026 (Note: Both parties initially planned to sign the memorandum at the Bürgenstock Resort in Switzerland on 19 June 2026, but both Iran and the United States agreed to instead sign the agreement two days ahead of the event at Versailles and Tehran.)
- Location: Palace of Versailles, France; Tehran, Iran; Islamabad, Pakistan
- Replaces: 2026 Iran war ceasefire
- Expiration: 8 July 2026
- Mediators: Pakistan; Saudi Arabia; Turkey; Qatar; Egypt
- Negotiators: (United States) JD Vance; (United States) Jared Kushner; (United States) Steve Witkoff; (Iran) Mohammad Bagher Ghalibaf; (Iran) Abbas Araghchi; (Pakistan) Shehbaz Sharif; (Pakistan) Asim Munir
- Signatories: (United States) Donald Trump; (Iran) Masoud Pezeshkian; (Pakistan) Shehbaz Sharif
- Parties: United States; Iran
- Language: English and Persian

Full text
- Islamabad Memorandum of Understanding between the United States of America and the Islamic Republic of Iran at Wikisource

The Islamabad Memorandum, officially the Islamabad Memorandum of Understanding between the United States of America and the Islamic Republic of Iran, was a memorandum of understanding (MoU) between the United States and Iran aimed at ending the 2026 Iran war. It was primarily brokered by Pakistan, with Qatar, Saudi Arabia, Turkey and Egypt also facilitating negotiations.

Pakistani prime minister Shehbaz Sharif said that the U.S. and Iran had reached agreement on final text to end the war on 12 June 2026. On 15 June, U.S. vice president JD Vance announced that the memorandum was digitally signed by representatives of the U.S. and Iran on the previous day. On 17 June, Trump and Iranian president Masoud Pezeshkian signed remotely the memorandum of understanding to end the war, with Trump signing it during dinner with French president Emmanuel Macron at the Palace of Versailles following the G7 summit, after which Pezeshkian signed it in Tehran. Iranian supreme leader Mojtaba Khamenei issued a written statement, saying that he endorsed the memorandum of understanding despite misgivings.

The memorandum was a 14-point "framework agreement" and provided for an end to military strikes, the reopening of the Strait of Hormuz to commercial shipping toll-free for 60 days, an end to the U.S. naval blockade of Iranian ports, and a 60-day extension of the ceasefire. Iran indicated that it intended to charge fees for unspecified services to ships transiting through the Strait of Hormuz, though analysts questioned whether this would be legal. Subject to a final deal, the Islamabad Memorandum would also include an at least $300 billion private fund designed to trigger investment in Iran in addition to the release of frozen Iranian assets.

The Islamabad Memorandum also immediately waived, but did not eliminate, sanctions that Trump imposed on Iran's oil exports, allowing Iran once again to sell its crude on the world market and restoring a revenue stream worth hundreds of billions of dollars. The United States waived sanctions on Iran for 60 days on 21 June. Major issues, however, were not settled in the framework agreement, which contains no accord on Iran's nuclear program or uranium stockpiles, although it does call for the downgrading of Iranian uranium from weapons-grade to reactor-grade following a final agreement. These issues are deferred to future talks to take place over the 60-day ceasefire extension. The framework agreement also does not mention the Iranian ballistic missile program or its network of non-state allies in the Middle East.

On 8 July, after Iran struck multiple commercial ships in the Strait of Hormuz and the US responded by striking Iranian territory, Trump indicated the MoU was "over" after Iran launched attacks on commercial vessels in the Strait of Hormuz to assert Iranian sovereignty over the Strait of Hormuz, startling US officials and shattering a brief diplomatic calm. He added that U.S. negotiators can continue negotiations, but he voiced pessimism regarding the potential results. On 18 July, Iran's Deputy Foreign Minister Kazem Gharibabadi announced the suspension of commitments related to the MoU, citing an alleged breach of obligations by the US as the reason for this action. On 17 August, the 60-day deadline for the US and Iran to negotiate a “final deal” to end the war passed.

== Background ==
The Islamabad Talks, were held in Islamabad, Pakistan, on 11 and 12 April 2026. Aimed at stabilizing the 2026 Iran war ceasefire and negotiating a potential resolution to the war, the talks were moderated by Pakistan, which played a central role in brokering the ceasefire and facilitating the talks.

The 300-member U.S. negotiating team was led by Vice President JD Vance, alongside special envoys Steve Witkoff and Jared Kushner; while the 70-member Iranian team was led by parliamentary speaker Mohammad Bagher Ghalibaf, alongside foreign minister Abbas Araghchi. The Pakistani mediating team was led by Prime Minister Shehbaz Sharif, Field Marshal Asim Munir, and Deputy Prime Minister Ishaq Dar. The talks lasted 21 hours between 11 and 12 April 2026, and consisted of three rounds with the first one being indirect and the second and third ones being direct. The day of the meeting, Trump told reporters that he did not care about whether an agreement would come out of the talks.

The teams were reportedly able to agree on the main points of the 10-points ceasefire, with the exception of the issues regarding the Strait of Hormuz and the Iranian nuclear program. The talks ended with no agreement reached, and no memorandum of understanding (MoU) being issued. Following the failure of the talks, U.S. president Donald Trump imposed a naval blockade on Iran on 13 April, interdicting any ships entering or departing Iranian ports.

The United States and Iran reached a final agreed-upon text for a peace deal to end the war on 12 June 2026. On 17 June, Donald Trump and Iranian president Masoud Pezeshkian signed remotely the memorandum of understanding to end the war, which established a 60-day extension of the ceasefire to negotiate the final terms of a deal.

== Discussions ==
On 11 June, key gaps regarding the release of frozen Iranian assets, the reopening of the Hormuz, and protocols for managing Iran's nuclear program during a 60-day ceasefire were narrowed in talks between Iranian officials and Qatari mediators in Tehran, coordinated with the United States. Two days later, Pakistani prime minister Shehbaz Sharif, a key mediator announced that a memorandum of understanding will be digitally signed the following day.

On 14 June, Iran said that the draft US deal included Tehran agreeing not to produce or acquire nuclear weapons, and the US agreeing to allow Tehran to dilute its highly enriched uranium stockpile in Iran. A commitment not to obtain nuclear arms, however, is not a new concession by Iran, which already made that pledge in ratifying the Nuclear Non-Proliferation Treaty more than a half-century earlier, and restated that pledge in the 2015 JCPOA.

The same day, US president Donald Trump and Iran announced that they had reached the agreement to end the war and reopen the Strait of Hormuz. Trump also said that he had authorized the lifting of the US naval blockade. However he clarified that if he does not like the agreement with Iran, the United States will "go right back to dropping bombs".

The US military later said that the blockade remained in effect until the agreement was signed on 19 June.

On the eve of the full signing, USA and Iran published the 14-points of the document.

On 18 June, Pakistan stated that the signing of the US-Iran memorandum of understanding to end the war implies Tehran will reopen the Hormuz "instantly" and the American blockade of Iranian ports will end "immediately."

== Implementation ==
Video of President Trump signing the memorandum as published by the White House

Implementation of the Islamabad Memorandum officially began after remote digital signatures by the United States and Iranian presidents. The agreement was expected to establish an immediate and permanent termination of military operations across all fronts, including Lebanon. Both parties committed to an immediate cessation of war. Iran was expected to instantly reopen the Strait of Hormuz and the United States was supposed to begin dismantling its naval blockade.

According to Iranian media, 11 Iranian ships broke through U.S. naval blockade after the Islamabad Memorandum was signed, while sources told the The Jerusalem Post that commercial ships in Hormuz were attracted by multiple Iranian drones after the MoU was agreed upon. The UAE already sent $3 billion of at least $10 billion to be sent to Iran from the UAE after the signing of the Islamabad Memorandum. On 18 June, CENTCOM announced that it had removed the naval blockade of Iranian ports. On 22 June, the US gave Iran-related 60-days general licence for oil sales, as required by the MoU. Israeli defense minister Israel Katz said that the IDF would not withdraw from its southern Lebanon security zone even if Trump asked for it.

== Text, gaps, and disputes over scope ==
The memorandum was a "framework agreement" and the terms remained secret at the time of its signing, although U.S. vice president JD Vance said the U.S. would release the full text later.

The agreement provided an end to military strikes, the reopening of the Strait of Hormuz to commercial shipping, and an end to the U.S. naval blockade of Iranian ports, and a 60-day extension of the ceasefire. Iranian first vice president Mohammad Reza Aref said Tehran would retain control over the Strait of Hormuz, noting that vessels using the strategic waterway should contribute to the cost of services provided by the Islamic Republic to ensure safe navigation. The Islamabad Memorandum also included a $300 billion fund for Iran in addition to the release of frozen Iranian assets, as well as sanctions relief. Major issues, however, were not agreed upon in the framework agreement, which contains no accord on Iran's nuclear program, uranium stockpiles, or sanctions relief. These issues were deferred to future talks to take place over the 60-day ceasefire extension. The framework agreement reportedly contains nothing about Iranian ballistic missile program or its network of non-state allies in the Middle East.

Prior to the framework agreement being signed, the U.S. and Iran described its terms differently. Iranian officials asserted that the U.S. pledges immediate sanctions relief and release of frozen Iranian assets during the 60-day negotiation period following the agreement, but the U.S. denied this. U.S. president Donald Trump claimed that the agreement means the strait will be "permanently toll-free" but Iran said it still intended to charge "fees" (but not "tolls") to ships traversing the Persian Gulf. Primary mediator Pakistan and Iranian officials said that the framework agreement halts "military operations on all fronts, including Lebanon, effective immediately." However, Israel, which was not a party to the agreement and was not directly involved in its negotiation, disputed this and said it "reserved the right" to strike Lebanon in retaliation for attacks by Hezbollah.

== Contents ==
Islamabad Memorandum

1. The United States of America and the Islamic Republic of Iran and their allies in the current war by signing this MoU, declare the immediate and permanent termination of military operations on all fronts, including in Lebanon, and undertake from now on not to initiate any war or any military operation against each other, and to refrain from the threat or use of force against each other, and ensuring the territorial integrity and sovereignty of Lebanon. Final deal will confirm the permanent termination of the war on all fronts, including in Lebanon, and other provisions of this paragraph.
2. The United States of America and the Islamic Republic of Iran undertake to respect each other's sovereignty and territorial integrity and to refrain from interfering in each other's internal affairs.
3. The United States of America and the Islamic Republic of Iran commit to negotiating and achieving the final deal in maximum 60 days, extendable with mutual consent.
4. Immediately upon the signing of this MoU, the United States of America will begin the removal of its naval blockade and any disturbances or impediments against the Islamic Republic of Iran, and will fully end the naval blockade within 30 days. During this period, the traffic of vessels will be in proportion to the numbers of pre-war traffic being restored by the Islamic Republic of Iran. The United States of America further undertakes to remove its forces from the proximity of the Islamic Republic of Iran within 30 days after the final deal.
5. Upon the signing of this MoU, the Islamic Republic of Iran will make arrangements using its best efforts for the safe passage of commercial vessels with no charge for 60 days only from the Persian Gulf to the Sea of Oman and vice versa. The traffic of commercial vessels will immediately start, and considering the need for removing the technical and military obstacles and demining by the Islamic Republic of Iran, will be instated within 30 days. The Islamic Republic of Iran will conduct dialogue with the Sultanate of Oman to define the future administration and maritime services in the Strait of Hormuz in discussion with other Persian Gulf littoral states in line with the applicable international law and the sovereign rights of coastal states of the Strait of Hormuz.
6. The United States of America undertakes with regional partners to develop a definitive, mutually agreed plan with at least $300 billion for the reconstruction and economic development of the Islamic Republic of Iran. The mechanism for the implementation of this plan will be finalized as part of a final deal within 60 days. All required licenses, waivers and permissions needed for the relevant financial transactions will be granted by the United States of America.
7. The United States of America undertakes to terminate all types of sanctions against the Islamic Republic of Iran, including the United Nations Security Council resolutions, i.e. IAEA [International Atomic Energy Agency] Board of Governors resolutions and all unilateral U.S. sanctions, primary and secondary, in an agreed-upon schedule as part of the final deal. The Islamic Republic of Iran and the United States of America acknowledge the critical importance of the sanctions-termination issue above mentioned, and expressed their intentions to immediately address these issues in the negotiations, in order to achieve mutual agreement on them.
8. The Islamic Republic of Iran reaffirms that it shall not procure or develop nuclear weapons. The United States of America and the Islamic Republic of Iran have agreed to resolve the disposition of stockpiled enriched material, pursuant to a mechanism that will be mutually agreed upon in accordance with the schedule mentioned in paragraph seven, with the minimum methodology to be downblending on site under the supervision of the IAEA. The two parties also agreed to discuss the issue of enrichment and other mutually agreed matters related to the Islamic Republic of Iran's nuclear needs based on a satisfactory framework being agreed upon in the final deal. The final deal will confirm the provisions of this paragraph. The United States of America and the Islamic Republic of Iran acknowledge the critical importance of the nuclear issues above mentioned and express their intention to immediately address these issues in the negotiations in order to achieve mutual agreement on them.
9. Pending the final deal, the United States of America and the Islamic Republic of Iran agree to maintain the status quo. The Islamic Republic of Iran will maintain the current status quo of its nuclear program, and the United States of America will not impose any new sanctions and will not deploy additional forces in the region.
10. The United States of America undertakes that immediately upon the signing of this MoU until the termination of sanctions, the U.S. Department of Treasury will issue waivers for the export of Iranian crude oil, petroleum products and derivatives, and all associated services, including banking transactions, insurances, transportation, etc.
11. The United States of America undertakes to make fully available for use the frozen or restricted funds and assets of the Islamic Republic of Iran upon the implementation of this MoU. The United States of America and the Islamic Republic of Iran will mutually agree on the procedures related to the release of these funds during the negotiations. Such funds, either retained in the original account or transferred, shall be made fully usable for payment to any ultimate beneficiary designated by the Central Bank of the Islamic Republic of Iran. The United States of America undertakes to issue all necessary licenses and authorizations accordingly.
12. The United States of America and the Islamic Republic of Iran agree that an executive mechanism will be established to monitor the successful implementation of this MoU and the future compliance of the final deal.
13. After signing this MoU and subject to the beginning of the implementation of paragraphs 1, 4, 5, 10 and 11 of this MoU and the continuing implementation of these measures, the United States of America and the Islamic Republic of Iran will start negotiations regarding the final deal exclusively on the other paragraphs.
14. The final deal will be endorsed by a binding UNSC [U.N. Security Council] resolution.

== Impact and reactions ==
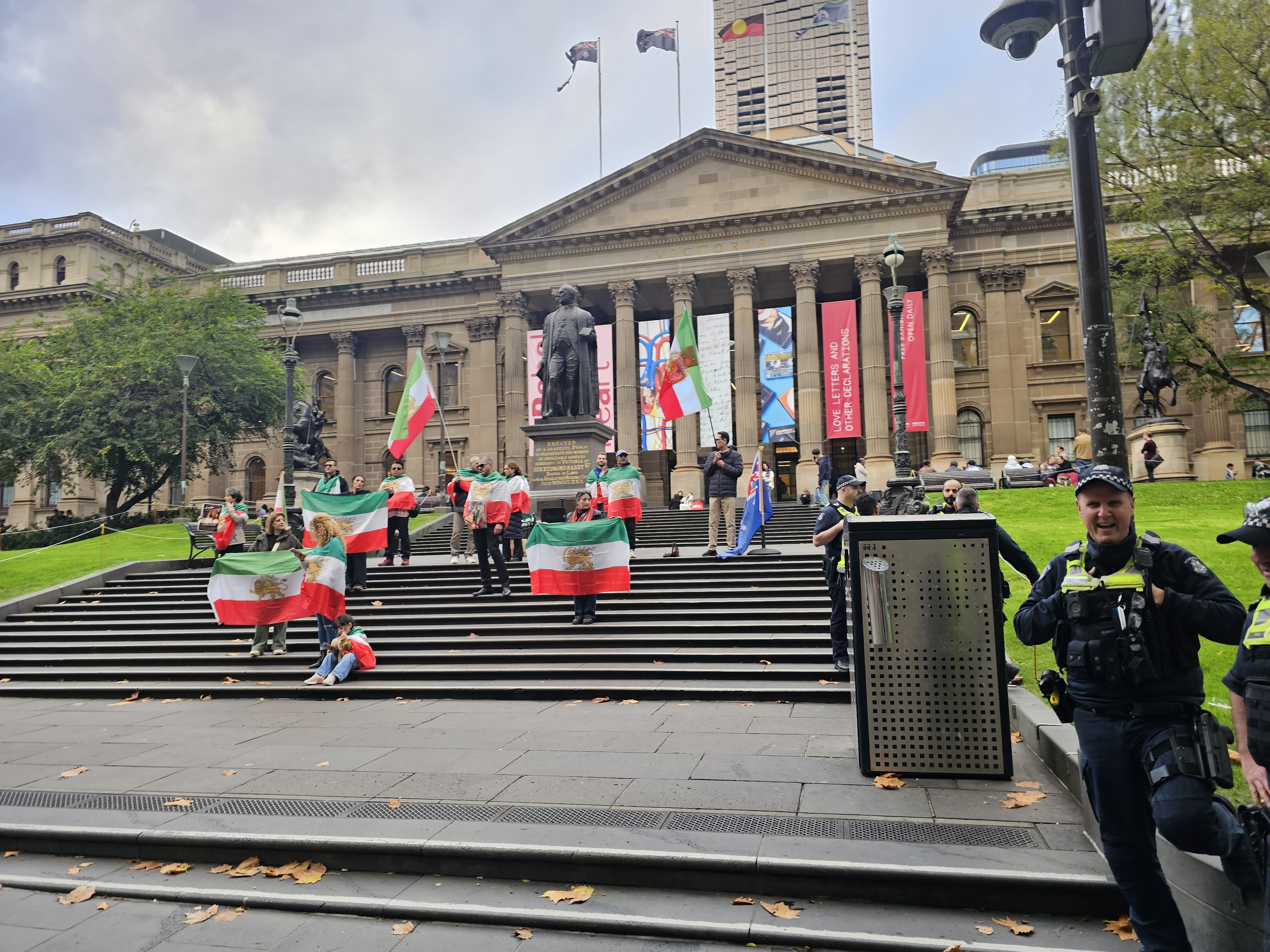
A pro-Pahlavi rally at the State Library Victoria in Melbourne, protesting the Islamabad Memorandum, 20 June 2026

=== Iran ===
Islamic Consultative Assembly Speaker and Chief Negotiator Islamic Revolutionary Guard Mohammad Bagher Ghalibaf who signed the deal and President Masoud Pezeshkian hailed the deal as step on road to winning. Ayatallah Nabavian, Iran's National Security Commissioner, criticized the deal, saying that there is no space for Iran to exercise management over the Hormuz Strait and comparing US investment in Iran's rebuilding and required opinion on its usage to the United States' colonization of Iran.

Iranian Principlists chanted against Iranian foreign minister Abbas Araghchi, Parliament Speaker and chief negotiator Mohammad Bagher Ghalibaf as they protested the deal with the United States outside a Iran Foreign Ministry office in Mashhad.

Iran's Assembly of Experts issued a statement in June 2026 calling for the assassination of Donald Trump and Benjamin Netanyahu, describing it as a religious duty. The clerics urged the government to take hard line in the truce talks. They also criticized the reopening of the Strait of Hormuz as a strategic mistake and demanded that Iran's nuclear project be kept off the negotiating table.

=== United States ===
Trump signed a preliminary version of the document in Versailles, France, while he was visiting the country for the 52nd G7 summit. Vance acknowledged that the agreement was "a very general document" roughly "a page and half" long. Treasury Secretary Scott Bessent anticipated further relief in energy costs for Americans.

=== Israel ===
Israel has expressed strong disapproval of the Islamabad Memorandum and intended to continue military operations in Lebanon.

Israel was not part of the U.S.-Iran negotiations over the MoU, and Israeli officials indicated that military operations will continue in Lebanon regardless of the MoU wording. Israel bombed Beirut twice during the U.S.-Iran negotiations, nearly derailing the negotiations each time.

After the preliminary MoU was signed, Pakistan and Iran said that the ceasefire halts "military operations on all fronts, including Lebanon, effective immediately" but Israel rejected this contention (see also 8 April 2026 Israeli attacks on Lebanon). Israeli prime minister Benjamin Netanyahu and the rest of his government said that Israel was not bound by the agreement, with Netanyahu saying that the country would "preserve its freedom of action" against threats from Hezbollah in Lebanon. While combat between Israel and Hezbollah was dialed back in the immediate aftermath of the memorandum's signing, the Hezbollah–Israel conflict continued. Israel conducted a strike south of Beirut on June 14. Israeli defense minister Israel Katz said that Israeli forces would remain in the territory in southern Lebanon seized since the start of the war, adding that the 200,000 displaced Lebanese residents from the security zone would never be allowed to return. Israeli national security minister Itamar Ben-Gvir rejected the memorandum, stating that Israel was "not subordinate to the United States" and that its security was "not up for bargaining". Following the deaths of four Israeli soldiers in southern Lebanon, Ben-Gvir called for Lebanon to be "obliterated" and posted on X that "all of Lebanon must burn." Finance minister Bezalel Smotrich similarly called for "opening the gates of hell" in Lebanon, repeating rhetoric he had previously used in March 2025 regarding the Gaza Strip. A report by the Israeli outlet Channel 14 reported that Netanyahu refused a request by Vance to scale back the IDF's presence in Lebanon.

=== Gulf states ===
Officials from Bahrain, Kuwait, Qatar, Saudi Arabia and the United Arab Emirates did not respond directly to the Memorandum, though representatives, former diplomats and analysts expressed their frustrations that the terms published would do nothing to address the Iranian use of drones and shorter-range missiles, noting that the eased financial sanctions would provide Iran with the resources it would need to rebuild its stockpiles of such weapons. Frustrations were registered that American statements early in the war had been to address such weapons, including a statement from U.S. secretary of state Marco Rubio early in the war that one of the American aims of the conflict was to "eliminate the threat of Iran's short-range ballistic missiles."

=== Financial markets ===
Oil prices eased and stocks rallied following the news of the potential peace agreement.

== Analysis ==
According to a BBC Persian reporter, the agreement is framed in Iran as a "victory for the country and defeat for the US and Israel." The Guardian reported that "Trump surrenders himself to Iran deal" and that the "deal met with anger, relief and incredulity" in "Israel and among [some] US Republicans.

Due to geographic and geopolitical details, parallels have been drawn between the United States' signing of the Islamabad Memorandum to Weimar Germany's signing of the Treaty of Versailles at the end of World War I.

In light of renewed hostilities in mid July, Javad Heiran-Nia, director of the Persian Gulf Studies Group at the Center for Scientific Research and Middle East Strategic Studies in Tehran, said the memorandum was never intended to resolve the underlying dispute. He said it was rather designed to halt hostilities and reopen the Strait of Hormuz to international shipping and said mediators lacked the instruments to resolve the dispute "unless a shift in the balance of power between Iran and the United States emerges as a result of limited military engagements." Heiran-Nia also stated that particularly the issue on Strait of Hormuz was never really Islamabad's to mediate as Iran preferred keeping the matter limited to bilateral discussions between Oman and itself so that a broader negotiation package under Pakistani auspices would not afford Washington "room for political manoeuvre."

Dania Thafer, executive director of the Gulf International Forum in Doha, said Pakistan's room for manoeuvre had narrowed as both sides hardened their positions over the Strait of Hormuz. She said Pakistan remained "highly dependent on both parties" while Iran was "bent on establishing its control over the Strait of Hormuz," and added that there was little Pakistan could do to de-escalate while Washington and Tehran remained in "an escalatory phase." She also said that the negotiations would be likely only once "the balance tips in favour of one side or the other."

Qamar Cheema, head of the Islamabad-based Sanober Institute, argued that Iran's own conduct would decide how the conflict settles. Calling Iranian authorities "ambitious and aggressive," he said that Iran was looking to "take risks to project power, which makes it less likely that any agreement will reach a final conclusion."

== Collapse ==
On 19 June, US president Donald Trump announced a renewed ceasefire between Israel and Hezbollah, facilitated by the US, Qatar and Iran. The ceasefire went into effect at 4pm local time on 19 June. Immediately after 4pm, Israel bombed Lebanon, a total of 12 times between 4pm and 4:45 pm. Israeli artillery fire was reported in Nabatieh at 4:48 pm local time. Then, on 20 June, just after midnight local time, Israeli soldiers attempted to capture Ali al-Taher in Nabatieh, Lebanon; Hezbollah killed some of the advancing Israeli soldiers. Israel then launched more than 100 attacks on Lebanon, killing civilians.

On 20 June, Iran declared that it closed the Strait of Hormuz again due to Israeli strikes in Lebanon, describing them as a violation of its deal with the US. This claim was denied by the US military. Shipping was stalled in the Strait of Hormuz following Iran's claimed closure of the strait. Some vessels approaching the strait deactivated their automatic identification systems to cross near the Omani shoreline and avoid Iranian military detection. The MoU signed between the US and Iran included a clause stating that both parties will avoid threats or the use of force against each other.

On 21 June, Trump issued a threat to invade Iran if they closed the Strait of Hormuz, following Iran's claim of its closure due to Israeli strikes in Lebanon. He warned that they "won't even make it back to their fucking country," suggesting a potential threat against Iranian negotiators in Switzerland.

On 26 June, Iranian state media reported that at least three foreign oil tankers which tried to cross the Hormuz "without authorisation" from Iran had turned back after an Iranian warning. On the same day, Trump accused Iran of violating the truce with US by launching drone attacks on ships in the Hormuz. The United States Central Command later announced that in retaliation to the alleged truce violations, the US hit Iranian missile and drone storage facilities, as well as coastal radar stations. Iran said that its retaliation to the attack will be "swift and decisive," prior to deleting the statement.

On 27 June, Iran said it targeted American sites in the Gulf region in response to the attack. The same day, the US military announced it struck Iranian military surveillance infrastructure, communication systems, air defense sites, drone storage facilities, and minelayer capabilities at the commander-in-chief's direction in retaliation to another alleged Iranian attack against a ship in the Hormuz. Trump accused Iran of repeatedly violating the ceasefire memorandum, expressing doubt about their ability to learn from past mistakes. He warned of a potential point where the U.S. will be forced to "complete the job" militarily, stating that if this occurs, the Government of Iran could cease to exist.

On 28 June, Iran said it fired ballistic missiles and drones towards the US Ali Al Salem Air Base in Kuwait and the US Fifth Fleet headquarters in Bahrain in retaliation to American attacks against five Iranian coastal sites.

On 7 July, Iran reportedly launched missiles at commercial vessels in the Strait of Hormuz, including the Al Rekayyat, a Qatari LNG tanker, causing significant damage. Iranian state TV claimed one of those vessel was struck for ignoring warnings, though Iran did not take direct responsibility. Qatar accused Iran of violating international law. Additionally, the UK military reported another tanker was hit by an unidentified projectile in the Strait of Hormuz. The U.S. announced a revocation of a license which authorized Iran oil sales as retaliation for the attacks, while Saudi Arabia condemned the attacks against both their and the Qatari tanker. The same day, the US Central Command announced that the US struck over 80 Iranian targets including air defense systems, coastal radar sites and dozens of IRGC small boats to degrade Iranian capability to disrupt international maritime trade using precision munitions in retaliation to alleged Iranian truce violations. Iran accused the US of violating the memorandum that concluded the war by reinstating oil sanctions. Iran said that it shot down an American MQ9 drone in southern Iran. Iran later announced that it targeted 85 American military targets in Bahrain, Kuwait in retaliation to alleged truce breaches. Iran later added that it targeted an American base in Bahrain. IRGC Navy announced that one of its soldiers was killed in a US drone attack.

On 10 July, exclusive satellite images obtained and analyzed by CNN in collaboration with the Institute for Science and International Security showed signs Iranian regime may be trying to rebuild its nuclear sites in apparent breach of the MoU, even before Trump appeared to signal its end by launching new strikes on the nation.

The memorandum began to collapse on 7 July 2026, when Iranian forces attacked three commercial vessels in the Strait of Hormuz, including a Qatari LNG tanker, setting it ablaze and damaging other ships. Iranian officials told The New York Times that internal inquiries traced the decision to Hossein Taeb, head of the Basij and former Revolutionary Guards’ intelligence agency chief. The United States responded with airstrikes on Iranian territory within a day of the ship attacks, effectively ending the ceasefire and resuming hostilities between the two countries.

Iranian authorities publicly attributed the collapse to the United States. According to several Iranian officials, however, this narrative failed to convince much of the country's own political establishment, including Pezeshkian.

== See also ==
- Iran–United States relations
- 2026 Lebanon war
