= Seizure of the Hankuk Chemi =

Naval incident between Iran and South Korea

The seizure of the Hankuk Chemi refers to the temporary seizure of the South Korean oil tanker Hankuk Chemi (한국케미) by the Islamic Republic of Iran in the Persian Gulf on 4 January 2021. Iran's Islamic Revolutionary Guard Corps Navy (NEDSA) stated that the tanker was seized because of "environmental and chemical pollution concerns." The tanker's South Korean owner denied any pollution had occurred. The ship was released on 9 April 2021 after South Korea agreed to unfreeze $1 billion in Iranian assets held in South Korean banks.

The seizure occurred during the Persian Gulf crisis that began in 2019, which saw Iranian authorities repeatedly seizing commercial shipping in the region as the United States placed sanctions on the country, freezing billions of dollars of Iranian assets internationally.

== Seizure and release ==
In early January 2021, the MT Hankuk Chemi departed Saudi Arabia's Jubail port for South Korea carrying 7,200 tons of chemicals, mostly methanol. The ship's 20-man crew included: Eleven Myanmar nationals, five South Koreans, two Indonesians, and two Vietnamese nationals.

The IRGC Navy seized the ship on 4 January and led it to Bandar Abbas. The Iranians said the seizure was carried out on orders of a provincial judge. South Korea called for the immediate release of the tanker on 5 January and said South Korean forces stationed in the Strait of Hormuz were dispatched to the area. Iranian official Ali Rabii rejected the request and denied that the seizure constituted "hostage-taking", asserting that the only "hostage" was $7 billion of Iranian assets held in South Korean banks that had been frozen in accord with U.S. sanctions on Iran.

Several days later, on 10 January, South Korea's Deputy Foreign Minister, Choi Jong-kan, met with Iran's deputy foreign minister Abbas Araghchi to discuss the matter. Choi requested the timely release of the tanker and its crew and reportedly said that Seoul was intent on resolving the issue. Most of the ship's crew were allowed to leave in February in an apparent confidence-building effort by Iran.

On 24 February, South Korea reportedly agreed to release at least $1 billion in Iranian assets frozen in two Korean banks, with the payment being made in cash. Iranian media reported the deal was made following a meeting between Iran's Central Bank governor Abdonnaser Hemmati and South Korea's ambassador to Iran Ryu Jeong-hyun, held at the latter's request. Some of the frozen funds had been earmarked to settle Iran's overdue payments to the United Nations. Qatar had previously offered to serve as mediator but it was unclear how much Qatar was involved in discussions.

The $1 billion in unfrozen funds were regarded as a first wave of a plan to unfreeze $7 billion of Iranian assets from South Korea. South Korean media said the United States was consulted before the deal was reached.

Iran released the Hankuk Chemi on 9 April 2021.

== See also ==
- Iran–South Korea relations
- Tehran Street
- Teheran-ro
