= List of ambassadors of Iran to Pakistan =

Coordinates: 33.725260°N 73.109528°E

Ambassador of Iran to Pakistan
- Persian: سفارت جمهوری اسلامی ایران در اسلام آباد - پاکستان
- Coat of Arms of Iran
- Incumbent; Reza Amiri-Moghaddam since July 17, 2023
- Inaugural holder: Mehdi Foroobar
- Formation: 1948

The Iranian ambassador in Islamabad is the official representative of the Government in Tehran to the Government of Pakistan. The ambassador is the head of the Embassy of Iran in Islamabad and is responsible for representing Iran's political, economic and cultural interests in Pakistan, as well as promoting bilateral relations between the two countries.

== List of representatives ==
Diplomatic accreditation	Diplomatic accreditation Solar Hijri calendar	Ambassador	Persian language	Observations	List of heads of state of Iran	List of prime ministers of Pakistan	Term end	Term end Solar Hijri calendar
1948	1326	Mehdi Foroobar	Persian: مهدی فروبار	Chargé d'affaires	Mohammad Reza Shah Pahlavi	Khawaja Nazimuddin		
1950	1328	Ali Nasr	Persian: سید علی نصر	H. E. M. Ali Nasr, a former Cabinet Minister, who has been Iran's Ambassador to China for a considerable time, has been appointed Iran's Ambassadar to Pakistan.	Mohammad Reza Pahlavi	Khawaja Nazimuddin	1952	
1952	1330	Massoud Moazed (fa)	Persian: مسعود معاضد	Massoud Moazed, Mojahed al-Mulk, was one of Iranian diplomats and politicians in the late Qajar and early days of the Pahlavi era.* from 1937 (1315) to 1938 (1316) the Consul General in Herat province (province) in Afghanistan. Between 1330 and 1332, he was the great ambassador of Iran in Egypt, which coincided with the collapse of the monarchy in Egypt. He finally died in Tehran in 1970 (1348 and was buried in Zahir al-Dawlah Cemetery.	Mohammad Reza Shah Pahlavi	Ghulam Muhammad	1952	1330
1954	1332	Javad Kowsar	Persian: جواد کوثر	Iran Monsieur Javad Kowsar, Counsellor and Chargé d'affaires a.i., 19, Kutchery Road, 1971 he was Iranian ambassador to Greece.	Mohammad Reza Shah Pahlavi	Ghulam Muhammad		
1954	1332	Abbas Amiraslan	Persian: عباس امیراصلان	Chargé d'affaires	Mohammad Reza Shah Pahlavi	Ghulam Muhammad		
1954	1332	Hesameddin Khosrow-Parviz	Persian: حسام‌الدین خسروپرویز	Hesam al-Din. Khosafi, Khosro Parviz, Hesamoddin, 1280- 1344,	Mohammad Reza Shah Pahlavi	Ghulam Muhammad		
1954	1332	Abdulrauf Khan		Chargé d'affaires	Mohammad Reza Shah Pahlavi	Ghulam Muhammad		
1954	1332	Mohsen Medhat	Persian: محسن مدحت	Chargé d'affaires Embassy: 3. Nadir House, MacLeod Road. Mohsen Medhat. Minister and Charge d'affaires. Embassy: 19, Kutchery Road.	Mohammad Reza Shah Pahlavi	Ghulam Muhammad		
1954	1332	Abolqasem Najm	Persian: ابوالقاسم نجم		Mohammad Reza Shah Pahlavi	Ghulam Muhammad		1333
	1332	Abdul Hussein Massoud Ansari (fa)	Persian: عبدالحسین مسعود انصاری	Abdul Hussein Massoud. — The eldest son of Ali Quli Ansari, Mushavir-ul-Mamalik. Born 1899. Educated at Tehran and in Europe. Joined the Ministry for Ambassador Extraordinary and Plenipotentiary 1958 Iranian ambassador to Russia M. Abdul Hussein Massoud Ansari. Ambassador. 'Presented his credentials in June 1949. Aged about 50 and entered the Persian Foreign Ministry some 30 years ago. Has served in Paris, Berlin, London, Moscow, India and Scandinavia	Mohammad Reza Shah Pahlavi	Ghulam Muhammad		
1954	1334	Nader Batmanghelidj (fa)	Persian: نادر باتمانقلیچ	Nader : b. 1902, Tabriz; P. Retired Army General and ExGovernor-General	Mohammad Reza Shah Pahlavi	Ghulam Muhammad		1336
1958	1336	Abdolhossein Hejazi (fa)	Persian: عبدالحسین حجازی	Abdolhossein Hejazi were suspected of secret activity against the government, helped by the British embassy in Tehran. Hejazi	Mohammad Reza Shah Pahlavi	Mohammed Ayub Khan		1337
1959	1337	Ahmad Ghadimi	Persian: احمد قدیمی	Ziauddin Ahmad	Mohammad Reza Shah Pahlavi	Mohammed Ayub Khan		1339
1961	1339	Musa Nuri Esfandiari	Persian: موسی نوری اسفندیاری	Musa Nuri-Esfandiari Iranian ambassador to Japan dismissed in 1946: Minister of Roads in 1951; Ambassador to Turkey 1955-1961: Ambassador to Pakistan 1961–62.	Mohammad Reza Shah Pahlavi	Mohammed Ayub Khan		1340
1962	1340	Hasan Arfa	Persian: حسن ارفع	Iranian ambassador to Turkey	Mohammad Reza Shah Pahlavi	Mohammed Ayub Khan		1341
1963	1341	Jafar Kafai	Persian: جعفر کفایی]] بهمن	Mr. Jafar Kafai has been appointed as Ambassadar of Iran to Pakistan. Mr. Jafar Kafai has been appointed as Ambassadar of Iran to Pakistan. Mr. Jafar Kafai was born in 1909. He graduated from the Iranian Ambassador in Pakistan. Mr. Djafar Kafai.	Mohammad Reza Shah Pahlavi	Mohammed Ayub Khan		1344
May 1966	1344	Hushang Ansary	Persian: هوشنگ انصاری		Mohammad Reza Shah Pahlavi	Mohammed Ayub Khan		1345
September 1, 1964	1342	Hassan Pakravan	Persian: حسن پاکروان		Mohammad Reza Shah Pahlavi	Mohammed Ayub Khan		1348
1970	1348	Mohammad Hossein Mashayekh Faridani (fa)	Persian: محمدحسین مشایخ فریدنی		Mohammad Reza Shah Pahlavi	Agha Muhammad Yahya Khan		1351
1973	1351	Manouchehr Zelli	Persian: منوچهر ظلی		Mohammad Reza Shah Pahlavi	Fazal Ilahi Chaudhry		1356
July 1, 1979	1357	Fereydoun Zand Fard	Persian: فریدون زندفرد		Mohammad Reza Shah Pahlavi	Mohammed Zia ul-Haq		1357
1979	1357	Nematollah Nassiri	Persian: نعمت‌الله نصیری		Mohammad Reza Shah Pahlavi	Mohammed Zia ul-Haq		1357
May 1, 1978	1357	Ahmad Minaei	Persian: احمد مینائی		Mohammad Reza Shah Pahlavi	Mohammed Zia ul-Haq	May 1, 1978	
1983	1361	Abbas Agha-Zamani (fa)	Persian: عباس آقازمانی	(born March 13, 1966, Abbas Agha Zamani known as Abu Sharif	Ali Khamenei	Mohammed Zia ul-Haq		1362
1984	1362	Mahmoud Mousavi (fa)	Persian: میرمحمود موسوی	Rassoul Mousavi, Advisor to the Foreign Minister, Former Iranian Ambassador to Pakistan and India	Ali Khamenei	Mohammed Zia ul-Haq		1368
1990	1368	Javad Mansouri (fa)	Persian: جواد منصوری		Akbar Hashemi Rafsanjani	Ghulam Ishaq Khan	October 9, 1993	
1994	1372	Mohammad-Mehdi Akhoundzadeh (de)	Persian: محمدمهدی آخوندزاده	Iranian Ambassador to Pakistan Mehadi Akhunzadeh	Akbar Hashemi Rafsanjani	Faruk Ahmad Khan Leghari	December 30, 1998	
1998	1377	Serajeddin Mousavi (fa)	Persian: سراج‌الدین موسوی		Mohammad Khatami	Ghulam Ishaq Khan	September 19, 2006	
September 4, 2002	1381	Mohammad-Ebrahim Taherian-Fard	Persian: محمدابراهیم طاهریان‌فرد		Mohammad Khatami	Ghulam Ishaq Khan	September 19, 2006	
September 30, 2007	1385	Mashallah Shakeri	Persian: ماشاءالله شاکری		Mahmoud Ahmadinejad	Pervez Musharraf	2011	
2011	1390	Alireza Haghighian (fa)	Persian: علیرضا حقیقیان		Mahmoud Ahmadinejad	Asif Ali Zardari	2015	
2016	1394	Mehdi_Honardoost (fa)	Persian: مهدی هنردوست		Hassan Rouhani	Nawaz Sharif	2019	
2020	1398	Mohammad Ali Hosseini	Persian: سید محمدعلی حسینی		Hassan Rouhani	Nawaz Sharif	2023	1402
July 17, 2023	1402	Reza Amiri-Moghaddam	Persian: رضا امیری مقدم		Ebrahim Raisi	Shehbaz Sharif		

== See also ==
- Iran–Pakistan relations
