= Shin Jae-min =

South Korean bureaucrat (born 1958)

- Hangul: 신재민
- Hanja: 申載旻
- RR: Sin Jaemin
- MR: Sin Chaemin

Shin Jae-min (Korean: 신재민; born 29 September 1958) is a South Korean bureaucrat. He was the former Vice Minister of Ministry of Culture, Sports and Tourism.

== Criticism ==
=== Controversial comments ===
He made a controversial statement of mentioning that the President of South Korea has a legal rights to fire the top executive of the Korean Broadcasting System on 5 July 2008.

=== Corruption charges in 2010 ===
Shin was the subject of the confirmation hearing around late August 2010 for his actions of illegally speculating in real estate, money-laundering, registering over phony resident address; earning his nickname "corruption department store".

=== Corruption charges in 2011 ===
On November 28, 2011, the Seoul Central District Prosecutor's Office arrested Shin for bribery charges from a lobbying incident that involved Lee Kuk-chul, chairman of the shipbuilding company, SLS Group.
