= 8 April 2026 Israeli attacks on Lebanon =

Israeli airstrikes and artillery shelling

- Part of 2026 Lebanon war and the 2026 Iran war
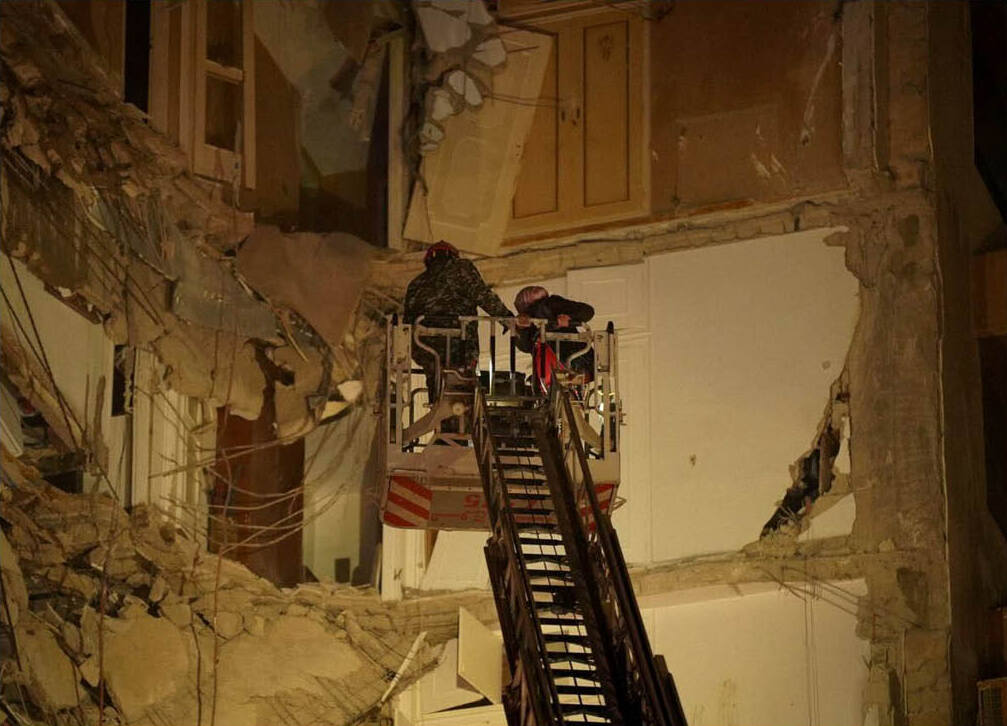
- Aftermath of an Israeli strike in Beirut
- Type: Airstrikes, artillery shelling
- Location: Lebanon
- Target: Hezbollah (disputed): Radwan Force; HQs, intelligence centers, missile infrastructure, aerial and naval units
- Date: 8 April 2026
- Executed by: Israel Defense Forces; Israeli Air Force; Israeli Ground Forces
- Outcome: 250 militants killed (Israeli claim)
- Casualties: 357 killed 1,223 injured

On 8 April 2026, shortly after the announcement of a ceasefire to the 2026 Iran war and Hezbollah signalling a pause in attacks against Israel according to the ceasefire, Israel launched what it described as its "most powerful attacks" on Lebanon, killing at least 357 people. The casualty count was among the highest of the 2026 Lebanon war.

Lebanon called the attacks Black Wednesday, and accused Israel of carrying out a massacre. Local observers said the attacks were not targeted and occurred in civilian areas of Lebanon, including in Beirut, where hospitals were flooded by casualties. The military gains of the attack were described as "likely to be limited", according to a BBC report. The Israel Defense Forces (IDF) dubbed the attacks Operation Eternal Darkness, which included airstrikes and artillery shelling, and said it only hit "terror targets" belonging to Hezbollah, killing at least 250 militants in 100 airstrikes in densely populated areas.

Israel's actions were condemned by over twenty observer states (Note: Including Australia, Bangladesh, Brazil, Canada, China, Colombia, Egypt, France, Indonesia, Iran, Ireland, Iraq, Italy, Jordan, Kuwait, Malaysia, Norway, Oman, Pakistan, Qatar, Russia, Spain, Syria, Turkey, and the United Arab Emirates) and the United Nations; but no criticism came from the US government. The attack disrupted the 2026 Iran war ceasefire. The EU and UK called for including Lebanon in the ceasefire, Ceasefire talks between Israel and Lebanon were announced on 10 April, described as "historic", with support from Lebanon's president Joseph Aoun and Israeli PM Benjamin Netanyahu. Israel said the negotiations would focus on disarming Hezbollah and could lead to a peace agreement.

== Background ==
Pakistan mediated the 2026 Iran war ceasefire and said Lebanon was included in the ceasefire, temporarily halting the 2026 Iran war for two weeks. Shortly after, Israeli prime minister Benjamin Netanyahu denied that was the case. Lebanese President Joseph Aoun welcomed the US–Iran ceasefire announcement and praised efforts by Pakistan, Egypt, and Turkey, saying he hoped it would mark a first step toward a comprehensive deal. U.S. President Donald Trump later told PBS News Hour that Lebanon was not included in the ceasefire. However, French president Emmanuel Macron said Lebanon was fully included in the ceasefire.

Hezbollah said that it halted attacks on Israel and on Israeli soldiers in Lebanon. On 9 April, CBS News spoke to diplomats who agreed that initially President Donald Trump had included Lebanon in the ceasefire, and even Israel had initially agreed to these terms. However, the United States changed its position after a phone call between Trump and Israeli Prime Minister Benjamin Netanyahu.

== Attacks ==
The Israeli attacks, involving fifty fighter jets of the Israeli Air Force and about 160 munitions, hit targets in central Beirut, including at least five different neighborhoods in Beirut's central and coastal areas. Several strikes occurred in busy commercial and residential locations during rush hour, causing widespread panic in the streets. Areas hit included southern Beirut, the port city of Sidon, the eastern Beqaa Valley, and the southern city of Tyre.

Israel dubbed its attacks "Operation Eternal Darkness" and said it targeted Hezbollah assets including headquarters, intelligence centers, missile infrastructure, sites related to the Radwan Force and aerial and naval units. The attacks were the largest since the start of the war, with Israel saying it have hit over 100 targets within ten minutes, and to have killed at least 250 Hezbollah militants. The strikes also hit targets in central Beirut, which was not given a warning. Other areas hit included southern Lebanon, southern Beirut, and the eastern Beqaa Valley.

One member of the Beirut municipality said "This is a residential area. There is nothing (military) here." Associated Press journalists reported seeing charred bodies in vehicles and on the ground at one of Beirut's busiest intersections in the Corniche al-Mazraa neighborhood, a mixed commercial and residential area. The IDF said that Ali Yusuf Harshi, the nephew and personal secretary of Hezbollah leader Naim Qassem, was killed in Beirut.

=== Shmestar funeral ===
An Israeli airstrike targeted a cemetery in the Beqaa Valley village of Shmustar during a funeral, killing at least 10 mourners and wounding four others. The Lebanese National News Agency reported that the strike directly hit the cemetery where the funeral was being held.

=== Adloun attack ===
Three girls were killed in an Israeli attack in the coastal town of Adloun, south of Sidon.

=== Hiram Hospital ===
Doctors without Borders reported its health care staff were injured by Israeli forces at Hiram Hospital, Tyre. Israeli forces also reportedly caused extensive damage at the hospital. Local Lebanese news also reported an airstrike near that hospital that killed four people. Israel also struck an ambulance near Tyre.

=== Hay el Sellom neighbourhood ===
The Hay el Sellom neighbourhood of southern Beirut, which was described as a densly populated and lively neighbourhood, was targeted by five strikes in quick succession, killing more than 80 people, including at least 18 children.

== Aftermath ==
Hospitals in Beirut were "flooded" by casualties. The American University of Beirut Medical Center issued an urgent appeal for blood donations as medical supplies ran low. Lebanese Health Minister Rakan Nassereddine described the situation as catastrophic, with civil defense teams still searching through damaged buildings and assisting the wounded. The Lebanese Red Cross reported at least 300 killed or wounded in Beirut and its surrounding areas, including at least 32 killed and 243 wounded in the capital alone.

Tania Baban, the Lebanon country director for the Chicago-based nonprofit MedGlobal, described the situation in Beirut as "total chaos", and said the attacks targeted civilian areas with no warning. She stated that the attacks were not targeted and called them an "open war crime". CNN reported that after a "tense" call, Prime Minister Netanyahu feared President Trump would declare Lebanon truce if Netanyahu did not announce truce negotiations with Lebanon.

On 10 April, it was announced that a round of Israeli-Lebanese ceasefire negotiations has been scheduled. According to Reuters, these talks were "historic"; it also noted support from Lebanese President Joseph Aoun, who called for the talks. Israeli Prime Minister Benjamin Netanyahu said the talks would focus on the disarmament of Hezbollah and could lead to a historic peace agreement.

== Reactions ==
Reactions to the Israeli attack in Lebanon: Countries that condemned Israel Countries that called for Lebanon's inclusion in the Iran war ceasefire Countries that expressed concern Israel

Lebanese President Joseph Aoun described the event as a "massacre", and the government announced a day of mourning and public holiday. In response, Iran threatened to attack Israel "if the aggressions against dear Lebanon are not brought to an immediate end." Iranian state media reported that Iran closed the Strait of Hormuz in response to Israeli attacks on Lebanon. Saeed Khatibzadeh, the deputy Foreign Minister of Iran, reportedly sent a message to the Oval Office that "you can not have a cake and eat it too".

UN Secretary-General António Guterres "unequivocally" condemned the Israeli attack, and UN human rights commissioner Volker Türk called the attacks "horrific", questioning the timing of the attack so soon after a ceasefire. President of France Emmanuel Macron condemned the Israeli strikes, describing them as "indiscriminate" and expressing "France's full solidarity" with Lebanon. European Union foreign policy chief Kaja Kallas and British foreign secretary Yvette Cooper called for Lebanon to be included in the Iran war ceasefire, while French foreign minister Jean-Noël Barrot said that the Israeli strikes are "unacceptable".

The Israeli actions were condemned by Lebanon, Australia, Bangladesh, Belgium, Brazil, Canada, China, Colombia, Egypt, France, Indonesia, Iran, Ireland, Iraq, Italy, Jordan, Kuwait, Malaysia, Norway, Oman, Algeria, Pakistan, Qatar, Russia, Spain, Syria, Turkey, the United Arab Emirates, and the United Nations. The EU and UK called for including Lebanon in the ceasefire. Armenia and Venezuela expressed solidarity with Lebanon. Pope Leo issued a statement in solidarity.

British Prime Minister Keir Starmer called the attacks "wrong". Spain called on the European Union to suspend the 1995 Association Agreement with Israel due to the "intolerable violation of international law". India, as well as Japan, expressed "deep concern". The Philippines expressed concern and called for a ceasefire. Greece's prime minister called the attacks "counter-productive".

Despite widespread local and Western condemnations, the United States government was notably silent regarding the incident. The United Nations, the UNHCR, the Red Cross, the World Federation of Trade Unions (WFTU) the Arab League, and the Apostolic Nunciature to Lebanon, among others, condemned the Israeli attacks. Protests erupted outside of the Israeli Embassy in London.

== See also ==
- Israeli war crimes
- List of massacres in Lebanon
- Israeli razing of cemeteries and necroviolence against Palestinians
