= Iranian frozen assets =

Iranian assets held abroad, frozen by the U.S.

Iranian frozen assets in international accounts, which were frozen following the imposition of sanctions that began in 1979, are calculated to be worth between $100 billion and $120 billion in the late 2010s. Almost $2 billion of Iran's assets are frozen in the United States. According to the Congressional Research Service, in addition to the money locked up in foreign bank accounts, Iran's frozen assets include real estate and other property. The estimated value of Iran's real estate in the U.S. and their accumulated rent is $50 million. Besides the assets frozen in the U.S., some parts of Iran's assets are frozen around the world by the United Nations.

As of January 2021, Iran had frozen assets in the following countries: $7 billion in South Korea; $6 billion in Iraq; $20 billion in China; $1.5 billion in Japan; $1.6 billion in Luxembourg.

== Background ==
Iran's assets were first frozen by U.S. president Jimmy Carter in 1979, after revolutionaries overthrew the U.S.-allied monarchy of Mohammad Reza Shah Pahlavi and took American diplomats hostages. After the Iranian Revolution in 1979, the United States ended its economic and diplomatic ties with Iran, banned Iranian oil imports, and froze approximately 11 billion 1980-US dollars of its assets.

Some of the assets were then unfrozen in 1981 after the Algiers Accords were signed and the hostage crisis ended. At the time of the 1979 revolution, the Pentagon resold some $400 million in Iranian military equipment already paid for by the deposed government, and the money was "placed in an escrow account".

Much of the frozen cash includes Iran's income from selling a limited amount of oil before the sanctions were lifted, when Iran could legally sell oil but could not transfer the money back to Iran, because doing so was illegal under U.S. sanctions.

== After nuclear negotiations ==
Some pages of the JCPOA were dedicated to listing individuals and entities whose assets would be unfrozen. Nader Habibi, a professor of economics at Brandeis University, expected the JCPOA to lead to the release of only about $30 billion worth of assets. A similar figure of about $32 billion was estimated by Valiollah Seif, the chief of Iran's central bank.

According to the Washington Institute in 2015: "the pre-deal asset freeze did not have as much of an impact on the Iranian government as some statements from Washington suggested. And going forward, the post-deal relaxation of restrictions will not have as great an impact as some critics of the deal suggest."

The US government also has seized a Manhattan skyscraper belonging to the Iranian government worth over $1 billion.

== Seizure of Iranian assets ==
Deborah Peterson and other plaintiffs brought a lawsuit in U.S. federal court against Iran, and obtained a judgment against Iran for its alleged role in the 1983 Beirut barracks bombings (in which 241 U.S. soldiers were killed) and for other acts of international terrorism. While foreign states usually enjoy immunity from claims in court, the plaintiffs invoked an exception to the Foreign Sovereign Immunities Act of 1976 that allows foreign states to be held liable for acts of state-sponsored terrorism. The central bank of Iran, Bank Markazi, challenged the execution of the judgment on various grounds. However, in 2012, Congress passed, and president Barack Obama signed, the Iran Threat Reduction and Syria Human Rights Act of 2012, which specified that the judgment in the Peterson et al. v. Islamic Republic of Iran et al. would be subject to execution and also abolished Bank Markazi to the execution of judgment. Bank Markazi challenged this statute as unconstitutional, arguing that Congress had unduly interfered with a judicial function by intervening in a specific case, but the U.S. Supreme Court, in Bank Markazi v. Peterson, ruled that Congress's act was constitutional.

Iran had denied involvement in any of the bombings. Former Iranian president Hassan Rouhani called the action "blatant robbery".

== Usage of the frozen assets ==
Since 1980, Iran has demanded that the US, European Union, and South Korea return all of its frozen assets; its demands have largely been ignored. Some seized assets, such as the military hardware Iran already paid for and bought from the US, have been resold to third parties. In October 2020, $1.4 billion of frozen cash was awarded in punitive and compensatory damages to the family of Robert Levinson after his abduction and presumed death. The US has also used the return of assets as a negotiating tool. For example, in September 2023, the US granted Iran access to nearly $6 billion of frozen assets in South Korea as part of a prisoner exchange, but later reneged on the deal and refroze them after the October 7 attacks.

In June 2026, it was reported that the US was considering the use of Iranian frozen assets to fund reconstruction and repair costs in Gulf states affected by the 2026 Iran war. According to a source familiar with the matter, US Treasury Secretary Scott Bessent directed a team to assess the cost of damage already inflicted on Gulf allies by Iranian retaliation. The source added that the US was also considering the use of Iranian frozen assets to cover the costs of any future damage. The reports came amid ongoing ceasefire negotiations between the US and Iran. A peace deal to end the three-month war was linked to the release of $24 billion in Iranian assets frozen by the US, and the proposed redirection of Iranian assets could further strain a fragile ceasefire that had recently been tested by renewed Israeli attacks in Lebanon against Iran-backed Hezbollah, which prompted retaliatory strikes by Iran.

== See also ==
- Afghan frozen assets
- Seizure of the Hankuk Chemi
- Sanctions against Iran
