= Reza Amiri-Moghadam =

Iranian diplomat

Reza Amiri-Moghadam is an Iranian diplomat. He is the Ambassador of the Islamic Republic of Iran to Pakistan. He is the former head of the operations unit of the Iranian Ministry of Intelligence and Security.
