= Timeline of the Israel–Hezbollah conflict (2 January – 31 March 2024) =

This timeline of the Israel–Hezbollah conflict covers the period from 2 January 2024, with the Assassination of Saleh al-Arouri, until 31 March 2024, one day prior to the Israeli airstrike on the Iranian consulate in Damascus.

Attacks from both sides continued throughout this period, with the US trying to dissuade Israel from further escalating the conflict or conducting a "pre-emptive strike" on Hezbollah, which would lead to "all hell breaking lose", according to an unnamed official speaking on condition of anonymity to the Washington Post.

== January ==
=== 2 January ===
- Israel conducted airstrikes in Syria targeting a military position near Kanaker housing Hezbollah members and other sites near Damascus.
- An Israeli airstrike targeting a meeting between Hamas and Jamaa Islamiya officials in Dahieh, Beirut killed seven people, four of which were Palestinian and three were Lebanese. Among the deaths were Hamas deputy leader Saleh al-Arouri and other high-ranking Hamas officials. The attack was the first targeted assassination conducted by Israel outside of the Palestinian Territories since 7 October. Demonstrations took place in Tripoli, Beirut and Tyre following the assassination.
- Two Hezbollah members were killed by an Israeli airstrike.
- Hezbollah attacked an IDF position in the vicinity of Marj with missiles.

=== 3 January ===
- Hezbollah announced that it carried out nine attacks targeting Israeli positions.
- The IDF fired heavy machine guns towards the outskirts of the towns of al-Bustan and Ayta ash Shab.
- In his second speech since the beginning of the war, Hassan Nasrallah said that Hezbollah is not afraid of an all-out war with Israel.
- An Israeli airstrike in Naqoura killed local Hezbollah commander Hussein Yazbek and three of his bodyguards, and injured nine other Hezbollah operatives.

=== 4 January ===
- NNA reported that the IDF bombed the outskirts of Naqoura.
- An Israeli drone launched a guided missile towards Yaroun.
- Hezbollah fired an anti-tank missile toward Metula.

=== 5 January ===
- Lebanon filed a formal complaint to the United Nations after the attack that killed Saleh Al Arouri in Beirut.
- IDF warplanes bombed the outskirts of Aita Al-Shaab and Chihine.
- The Fajr Forces said that they bombed Kiryat Shmona.

=== 6 January ===
- In the morning the IDF closed all streets and intersections along the border with Lebanon.
- The IDF conducted three strikes inside the Sidon District.
- IDF airstrikes hit Aita Al-Shaab, Yaroun, Khiam, Kafr Kila, Al-Housh, Burj Al-Muluk, Markaba, Rab El-Thalathine, and Al-Adaysah. A Syrian woman was reportedly injured in Burj al Muluk, while two civilians suffered burns from phosphorus bombs in Khiam.
- Hezbollah struck a site in Metula and IDF sites in Zarit, Margalit and Bayad Blida.
- Hezbollah fired 62 missiles at Meron airbase in northern Israel in retaliation for the killing of Saleh al-Arouri.
- Hezbollah announced four members killed on that day.

=== 7 January ===
- A building in Metula was damaged by rocket fire from Lebanon.
- The IDF deployed the Sky Dew blimp to monitor the Israel–Lebanon border.
- Screens at Beirut–Rafic Hariri International Airport were hacked allegedly by the Christian group Jnud al-Rab to display an anti-Hezbollah message. Jnud al Rab denied any involvement.

=== 8 January ===
- An Israeli airstrike killed Wissam al-Tawil, a senior commander of Hezbollah's Redwan Force, and another Hezbollah fighter in Majdel Selm.
- An anti-tank missile hit a building in Kiryat Shmona.
- IDF fighter jets struck Hezbollah targets in Marwahin and Ayta ash-Shab.
- An anti-tank missile fired by Hezbollah struck an apartment building in Shtula, lightly injuring an Israeli.
- The IDF killed Hassan Hakashah in Beit Jinn, who was a central figure of Hamas responsible for rocket attacks targeting Israel from Syrian territory.

=== 9 January ===
- Hezbollah claimed to have launched drones at the headquarters of the IDF's Northern Command in Safed as well as three other IDF posts along the Lebanese border. The IDF acknowledged that one of its bases was attacked, but said it did not sustain damage while not disclosing which base.
- Three Hezbollah members were killed in an Israeli drone strike on their car in Ghandouriyeh.
- Ali Hussein Barji, the commander of Hezbollah's aerial forces in southern Lebanon who was responsible for dozens of drone attacks, was killed by an airstrike in Khirbet Selm.

=== 10 January ===
- A civilian was killed when an Israeli artillery shell fell near his home in Kafr Kila.
- An IDF drone strike on a house in Kfarchouba killed a Hezbollah official and injured the homeowner.
- The Lebanese Red Cross said they retrieved a decomposing body near Metula.
- Israeli news outlets reported that a missile fired by Hezbollah damaged homes in an undisclosed settlement.

=== 11 January ===
- The Islamic Health Committee said two of its medics were killed by an Israeli airstrike targeting one of its affiliated clinics.
- At least ten rockets were fired from Lebanon into communities in northern Israel, and three of them were intercepted by air defenses.
- Israeli shelling was reported near Aitaroun.

=== 12 January ===
- Hezbollah fired two anti-tank missiles into Malkia.
- The IDF said it conducted airstrikes in Labbouneh, Ramyah, and Ayta ash-Shab. It also struck two Hezbollah cells in Marwahin and an anti-tank missile squad in Yaroun as they prepared to carry out attacks.

=== 13 January ===
- A home in Shtula was damaged by an anti-tank missile fired from Lebanon.
- The IDF conducted airstrikes in Meiss Ej Jabal and Yarine.

=== 14 January ===
- The IDF said that they killed four militants who infiltrated the Israeli border through Shebaa while an IDF unit was patrolling nearby. Five IDF soldiers were wounded. A group calling itself the "Islamic Azz Brigades" (Islamic Glory Brigade) later claimed responsibility for the attack and announced that three of its members were killed while two managed to escape.
- An Israeli man and his 70-year-old mother were killed in an anti-tank missile attack by Hezbollah on Yuval.
- The IDF said that it carried out "intensive strikes" against targets in south Lebanon reaching up to 21 miles away from the border.

=== 15 January ===
- The IDF said that two rockets fell in open areas after a Hezbollah strike that targeted Mattat.
- Hezbollah said that they attacked a gathering of Israeli soldiers in Metula.
- IAF fighter jets conducted strikes on Odaisseh, Aalma ech Chaab, Jibbain, and Maroun al-Ras, while IDF shelling hit the plains of Marjayoun.
- The IDF launched interceptor missiles at several "suspicious aerial targets" over Yaroun and Rmaich.

=== 16 January ===
- The IDF conducted at least 16 aerial and artillery strikes in the Suluki Valley. It also carried out strikes near Ayta-al-Shaab, with one of them hitting a Hezbollah anti-tank missile launcher.
- Hezbollah said it launched rockets at Israeli troops.

=== 17 January ===
- The IDF fired five smoke shells towards Syrians working in a grape orchard.
- The National Evangelical Church of Alma ech Shaaab was targeted by the IDF and damaged the home of its pastor. Later, An IDF drone hit a house near a mosque in Aita Al Shaab.
- Israeli artillery struck the outskirts of Deir Mimas and Marjayoun.
- Hezbollah said that it targeted a gathering of soldiers in Raheb.
- Hezbollah announced that they struck the vicinity of Ruwaisat Al-Alam and Kfarchouba with Burkan missiles. The IDF responded by striking targets in the outskirts of Rachaya Al Foukhar.
- A Hezbollah member and a member of the Al-Qassam Brigades were killed and six civilians were wounded during clashes on the Israel–Lebanon border.

=== 18 January ===
- The IDF targeted Hezbollah infrastructure in Odaisseh, Kafr Kila, and Marjayoun.
- An Israeli warplane aimed white phosphorus shells at Meiss Ej Jabal.
- An Israeli drone struck a house in Kawkaba, causing material damage.
- Israeli artillery shelled the outskirts of Dhayra and Yarine.
- Two rockets from Lebanon fell in open areas towards Arab al-Aramshe.

=== 19 January ===
- NNA said IDF attacks targeted homes and destroyed three empty ones in Kafr Kila.
- Hezbollah claimed three border attacks including two targeting "deployments of soldiers of the Israeli enemy".

=== 20 January ===
- An IDF strike on a car passing through Bazouriyeh, Lebanon, killed four people. Hezbollah announced that one of its local commanders, Ali Hudruj, was killed in the strike. The other occupant of the car was identified as businessman Mohammad Baqir Diab.
- Five senior IRGC officers and a number of Syrian militants were killed after an apparent IDF airstrike hit a building in Damascus.

=== 21 January ===
- An Israeli airstrike on a car near a Lebanese Army checkpoint in Kafra killed a Hezbollah official and injured seven others. The attack targeted senior Hezbollah commander Fadi Suleiman who survived the attack.
- Hezbollah announced that it struck a house in Avivim in retaliation for the alleged killing of a civilian woman in the Kafra attack. The statement was later modified after hospital officials said that the woman was alive.
- The IAF attacked the Civil Defense Center of the Islamic Health Authority in Kafr Kila damaging ambulances.

=== 22 January ===
- A man died from injuries sustained in airstrikes on Kafr Kila.
- Hamas announced the death of two of its members who were critically injured after an attack on 17 January.
- Hezbollah announced the death of two of its members.

=== 23 January ===
- Hezbollah said that it targeted the IDF's Northern Command center in Mount Meron.
- The IDF said its fighter jets destroyed a "military asset" in Lebanon used by Hezbollah and operated by Iranian forces, carried out airstrikes in an open forest area in the Iqlim Al-Tuffah region, and hit three houses in an air raid on Blida.
- An Israeli drone fired two missiles at a shipping container in Al-Wazzani.
- Hezbollah claimed it had scored direct hits on a group of Israeli soldiers on Cobra Hill with missiles.
- Hezbollah launched at least 15 rockets targeting an IDF base on Mount Meron "in retaliation" for Israeli attacks in Syria.

=== 24 January ===
- An anti-tank missile from Lebanon was fired towards the Shomera area.
- Al-Manar reported Israeli shelling south of Naqoura.
- Israeli media reported that two Hezbollah mortar shells fired into the Metula area the previous week were suspected to have contained white phosphorus.

=== 25 January ===
- The IDF struck a home in Tayr Harfa, injuring three civilians.
- The IDF struck an alleged Hezbollah-run airstrip in Birket Jabbour in Jezzine, outside UNIFIL's area of operations.
- Israeli media claimed that three militants from Lebanon infiltrated the border, in a later statement IDF spokesperson Avichay Adraee denied such an incident had occurred.
- Hezbollah carried out aerial attacks against an air defense system site in northern Israel.

=== 26 January ===
- Hezbollah announced that they had conducted nine attacks on the IDF.
- IDF attacks on Hezbollah sites in Bayt Lif and Deir Aames killed four Hezbollah fighters.
- Hezbollah targeted Israeli barracks in Gonen using an Iranian-made Falaq-1 rocket system, saying that this was the first attack using the weapon during the war.

=== 27 January ===
- Hezbollah conducted 14 attacks primarily targeting Israeli military forces and infrastructure.

=== 28 January ===
- Hezbollah announced the death of three of its members.
- The IAF carried out 14 airstrikes on southern Lebanon destroying 11 houses and damaging 27. Five civilians sustained injuries.
- Hezbollah stated that they attacked gatherings in Tal Shaar, the Ramim barracks, Ya'ra barracks, Motella and Hanita.

=== 29 January ===
- At least two people were killed and several others were injured during a series of explosions at pro-Iranian militia sites near the Sayyidah Zainab Mosque in Syria. Syrian state media reported that Iranian advisors were killed in the attack.
- An anti-tank missile was fired at a post in the Metula area.
- Two Israeli soldiers were lightly wounded by a Hezbollah rocket attack in Biranit. Several other Hezbollah projectiles fell in open areas in northern Israel, causing no casualties or damage.
- Hezbollah announced the death of two of its members.
- Defense Minister Yoav Gallant said that Israeli troops will "very soon go into action" in the border with Lebanon.

=== 30 January ===
- IAF fighter jets attacked Hezbollah's operational headquarters and an observation post near Khiam, as well as other military infrastructure near Ayta ash Shab and Muhajbib.
- A projectile launched from Lebanon fell into an open area west of Arab al-Aramshe.

=== 31 January ===
- Anti-tank missiles were launched toward Yiftah, Ya'ara, and Hanita, causing no casualties.
- The IDF said it struck Syrian Army posts in response to rocket fire onto the Golan Heights.

== February ==
=== 1 February ===
- Two anti-tank missiles were fired at IDF outposts in Mount Hermon and Har Dov.

=== 2 February ===
- An IAF fighter jet struck a Hezbollah cell in the Itron area.
- Two projectile launches were detected in northern Israel from Lebanon.
- An IRGC member was killed in alleged Israeli airstrikes in Aqraba, south of Damascus.

=== 3 February ===
- Two Amal Movement fighters were killed in airstrikes in Blida.
- Hezbollah claimed it attacked the Khirbet Maar military base and the Ramtha site, achieving "direct hits".

=== 4 February ===
- The Amal Movement fired 15 rockets into northern Israel, damaging a garage in Yir'on.
- Hezbollah announced the death of two of its members in southern Lebanon.
- The IDF shelled a rocket-launching position and observation post and a Hezbollah cell in Meiss Ej Jabal and Blida.

=== 5 February ===
- Three Hezbollah fighters were killed by Israeli airstrikes.
- Hezbollah claimed it achieved direct hits on Israeli soldiers in the Shebaa Farms and Kfarchouba.
- The Amal Movement announced the death of three of its members who were killed in Bayt Lif.

=== 6 February ===
- IAF jets struck a building used by Hezbollah in Marwahin.
- Two Israeli soldiers were lightly wounded by rocket attacks from Lebanon.

=== 7 February ===
- Israeli airstrikes destroyed a building in Homs, Syria, killing ten people including six civilians.
- Hezbollah announced the death of two of its fighters in southern Lebanon.
- A civilian was killed and two others were injured during a series of Israeli strikes in Khiam.

=== 8 February ===
- An anti-tank missile was fired into a home in Metula, causing no casualties.
- Three Israeli soldiers were injured, one seriously, when a Hezbollah anti-tank missile struck the Biranit military base.
- Israeli warplanes reportedly flew over Beirut.
- An IDF drone targeted a car in Nabatieh. Israeli media said Abbas al-Dabs, a regional Hezbollah commander, was assassinated in the attack. Hezbollah fired 30 rockets towards Meron in response to the attack.

=== 9 February ===
- Speaker of the Lebanese parliament and head of the Amal Movement, Nabih Berri, formerly announced his readiness to fully engage in combat against Israel.
- Over 30 rockets fired from Lebanon were mostly intercepted by the Iron Dome or landed in open areas.
- Hezbollah announced the death of two of its members.

=== 10 February ===
- Three people were killed by an Israeli airstrike near Damascus.
- A Hamas senior official survived an Israeli assassination attempt in Lebanon which killed two civilians.
- A Lebanese civilian was killed and nine others were injured after IDF artillery targeted a mosque in Hula.
- Hezbollah announced the death of another member.
- Hezbollah claimed that it took control of an IDF Skylark UAV.

=== 11 February ===
- The Amal Movement announced the death of two of its members.
- The IDF targeted Hezbollah sites in Marwahin.

=== 12 February ===
- An Israeli drone targeted a car in Bint Jbeil, wounding a Hezbollah official.
- IDF Chief Herzi Halevi announced the withdrawal of the 36th division from Gaza and its redeployment to Northern Israel.
- A house in Maroun al-Ras was attacked by the IDF, killing two Hezbollah members and two Palestinian Islamic Jihad members.
- A Lebanese Internal Security Forces (ISF) sergeant was killed in an attack in Hula.
- Hezbollah claimed that it targeted a police building in Kiryat Shmona, injuring two people.

=== 13 February ===
- Hezbollah announced the death of three of its members overnight.
- Two people were severely injured by a Hezbollah rocket attack in Kiryat Shmona.
- The IDF struck two military complexes belonging to Hezbollah, one in Ramyah and another in Rashaya al-Fukhar.
- Hassan Nasrallah said that Hezbollah's cross-border shelling into Israel would only end when Israel's "aggression" on the Gaza Strip stops.

=== 14 February ===
- An Israeli soldier was killed and eight others were wounded when a rocket from Lebanon struck a building in Safed. Israel intensified its attacks on southern Lebanon in response.
- Ten civilians were killed and at least seven others wounded in southern Lebanon by IDF airstrikes.
- IDF said that it killed a senior commander of the elite Redwan Force unit along with a deputy and another fighter in Nabatieh. This was confirmed by Hezbollah the next day.
- Hezbollah announced the death of four of its fighters.

=== 15 February ===
- Anti-tank missiles were fired into Israel from Lebanon as Hezbollah vowed to respond to Israeli airstrikes the day prior.
- Hezbollah announced the death of an additional six members from attacks on 14 February.
- Hezbollah said it fired dozens of Katyusha-type rockets into Kiryat Shmona.
- Hezbollah fired rockers at Israel in response to Israeli attacks that killed 10 people in Lebanon.

=== 16 February ===
- According to the state-run NNA, Israeli warplanes hit five villages throughout southern Lebanon.
- The IDF struck a house in Qantara killing three Amal Movement members. The Amal Movement announced the death of another member killed in a separate attack.
- Hezbollah announced the death of another two of its members in the Israeli airstrikes on 14 February, bringing its death toll in the attacks to 12.
- Hezbollah conducted five attacks from southern Lebanon into northern Israel.

=== 17 February ===
- Hezbollah hit an IDF position facing Rmaich with a Falaq-1 missile and hit positions in the Shebaa Farms.
- The IDF targeted a house in Maroun al-Ras and shelled in the vicinity of Rashaya al-Fukhar.
- Hezbollah announced two attacks on surveillance equipment and IDF positions.

=== 18 February ===
- Hezbollah announced nine attacks on various sites in northern Israel.

=== 19 February ===
- Two IDF airstrikes hit the town of Ghazieh 60 km north of the border that hit a tile manufacturer and a tire warehouse. According to a source of Arab News, the owners were on the US sanctions list for financing terrorism.

=== 21 February ===
- At least two people were killed in a suspected Israeli airstrike on a residential building in the Kafr Sousa neighborhood of Damascus.
- At least two civilians, including a child, were killed in an Israeli airstrike on the Lebanese village of Majdal Zun.
- A projectile struck a home in Yuval.
- An IDF drone strike killed two Hezbollah members in Kfar Remen.

=== 22 February ===
- Two paramedics and a Hezbollah fighter were killed in an attack on the Hezbollah-affiliated Islamic Health Committee.

=== 23 February ===
- Hezbollah announced the death of one of its fighters.

=== 24 February ===
- IDF fighter jets struck Hezbollah sites in Rab el-Thalathine, Ayta ash-Shab and Blida.
- Israeli artillery struck the outskirts of Rachaya al Fakhr.
- Hezbollah claimed three attacks on IDF positions in northern Israel.

=== 25 February ===
- Two Hezbollah members were killed in an alleged Israeli airstrike on a truck outside Al-Qusayr, Syria.
- Several barrages of rockets were fired into northern Israel from Lebanon, which Israeli authorities said all landed in open areas.

=== 26 February ===
- Israel launched its first attacks into eastern Lebanon since the conflict began, killing two Hezbollah members near Baalbek.
- Hezbollah said it fired 60 Katyusha rockets at an IDF headquarters in response to the attack near Baalbek.
- An Israeli drone strike targeting a vehicle in Majadel killed local Hezbollah commander Hassan Hussein Salami.
- Hezbollah said it shot down an Israeli Hermes 450 drone with a surface-to-air missile.
- The al-Quds Brigades announced the deaths of two of its members.
- An Israeli civilian was lightly wounded when a rocket struck a chicken coop in Shtula.

=== 27 February ===
- Hezbollah fired dozens of rockets at a military site in Galilee, and an anti-tank missile struck the Mount Meron air traffic control base.
- The IDF shelled an area near Yaroun and conducted airstrikes against Hezbollah infrastructure throughout southern Lebanon.
- UNIFIL said that the recent escalation between Israel and Hezbollah could potentially threaten the possibility of a political solution to the conflict.

=== 28 February ===
- Hamas fired two barrages of Grad rockets into northern Israel from southern Lebanon, with one rocket striking a house in Kiryat Shmona causing no injuries.
- Israeli forces attacked a munition warehouse belonging to Hezbollah and other military infrastructure in the Ramyeh region and a weapon production site in the Khirbet Selm area.
- Israel carried out strikes in Damascus and nearby areas targeting Hezbollah sites, with a large explosion being reported in the Sayeda Zainab neighborhood. Syrian state television said that its air defenses shot down most of the missiles. Eight people, including at least two Hezbollah members, were killed.
- At least two people were killed and 14 others were injured after Israeli warplanes attacked Siddikine and Kafra.

=== 29 February ===
- An Israeli strike on a Hezbollah-affiliated truck on the Lebanon–Syria border killed at least one fighter.

== March ==
=== 1 March ===
- An Israeli strike on a villa near Baniyas, Syria, killed IRGC Navy officer Reza Zarei and two Hezbollah members, and injured seven others.

=== 2 March ===
- Hezbollah announced the death of one other fighter overnight.
- An IDF strike on a car in the coastal road of Naqoura killed a senior Hezbollah official and two other members of Hezbollah's Imam Hussein Division. It was reported that among them was the grandson of Hassan Nasrallah.
- Hezbollah announced the death of three other members bringing the death toll to seven since midnight.

=== 3 March ===
- The IDF shelled the vicinity of Khiam.
- Hezbollah claimed to have inflicted casualties in an attack on an IDF position near Wazzani.
- Hezbollah claimed it directly struck Israeli forces with rockets and artillery shells as they attempted to infiltrate Lebanese territory twice.

=== 4 March ===
- An anti-tank missile from Lebanon killed an Indian foreign worker and wounded seven others in Margaliot.
- Three volunteer rescue workers were killed in an attack on an Islamic Health Authority center in Odaisseh.

=== 5 March ===
- At least three civilians were killed in an IDF raid in Hula. Hezbollah later announced the death of two of its members in the town.
- Thirty rockets were fired from Lebanon towards Kiryat Shmona with ten being intercepted by the Iron Dome.
- An Israeli F-15 fighter jet shot down a drone that entered Israeli airspace from Syria.

=== 6 March ===
- A Hezbollah member was killed while six others were injured in IDF airstrikes in Bint Jbeil and Dibbine.
- Israel fired missiles at two military positions between Nawa and Jasim, Syria in response to attacks on the Golan Heights.
- A Lebanese civilian was killed after an Israeli attack in his home in Al-Dhahaira.

=== 7 March ===
- Hezbollah announced the targeting of the Avdon settlement with Katyusha rockets.
- The IDF shelled Alma Al-Shaab, Marjaayoun plains, Yaroun and Kfar Kila.
- The IDF carried out attacks on Hezbollah targets in Aitaroun and Ayta ash-Shaab killing a Hezbollah member.
- Hezbollah fired several barrages of rockets and missiles into northern Israel, striking a home in Metula.

=== 8 March ===
- Seven rockets were fired into northern Israel from Lebanon. Two were shot down by the Iron Dome while the other five landed in open areas.
- Hezbollah announced the death of three of its members.

=== 9 March ===
- Israeli jets targeted Hezbollah infrastructure in Ayta ash-Shab, Majdal Zun and Kafra.
- A UNIFIL and Lebanese army patrol came under fire in the vicinity of Aita Ash-Shaab with no injuries reported.
- Five people, including three Hezbollah members, were killed and at least nine others were wounded in an IDF strike on a house in Khirbet Selm.

=== 10 March ===
- Hezbollah fired 37 Katyusha rockets at Meron without any injuries reported in response to the attack on 9 March.
- The IDF said it struck and killed a Hezbollah anti-tank missile squad in Chebaa.
- Three members of the Islamic Group were killed after an Israeli strike on Aqroub.

=== 11 March ===
- Hezbollah said it attacked the Golan Heights with four drones, targeting an air defense outpost.
- The IDF said that it struck a Hezbollah compound in Jibbain.
- Hezbollah announced the death of one of its members.
- The IDF struck near Baalbek killing one civilian and injuring others.

=== 12 March ===
- Hezbollah said it fired around 100 Katyusha rockets toward northern Israel.
- Israel struck a house in Bint Jbeil.
- Israeli warplanes struck a Hezbollah facility in the Bekaa Valley, killing at least one Hezbollah member.
- The IDF said it struck two Hezbollah military facilities in Quneitra Governorate, Syria.

=== 13 March ===
- An Israeli drone strike targeting a car outside Tyre killed senior Hamas operative Hadi Ali Mustafa and a Syrian national who was nearby.
- The IDF said that it carried out airstrikes on Hezbollah sites in Qantara, Yater and Aalma al-Chaeb.

=== 14 March ===
- Three projectiles fired from Lebanon targeted Malkia. The IDF responded with attacks on Naqoura, Yaroun and Hamoul.

=== 15 March ===
- The IDF struck the areas of Wadi Hamoul and Houla with artillery.
- Hezbollah claimed responsibility for six attacks on Israeli positions.
- The IDF struck Hezbollah targets in Ayta ash Shab, Aalma El Chaeb and Labbouneh.

=== 16 March ===
- IDF airstrikes targeted sites in the areas of Meiss El Jabal and Marwahin.
- The IDF said that it detected launches from Lebanon towards the areas of Malkiyah Misgav Am and Shebaa.

=== 17 March ===
- Israeli airstrikes struck several locations in southern Syria, resulting in material losses and one soldier being wounded.
- Israel targeted a Hezbollah compound in the Khiam area in response to rocket fire toward Acre.

=== 18 March ===
- The IAF said it struck Hezbollah infrastructure in Meiss Ej Jabal and Odaisseh.

=== 19 March ===
- Israeli strikes allegedly targeted Hezbollah arms depots near Damascus, causing material damage. Syrian air defenses shot down several missiles.
- The IDF said it struck a Hezbollah operative in Marwahin and a Hezbollah gathering in Odaisseh.

=== 20 March ===
- Hezbollah struck an IDF site near Menara wounding two soldiers.
- The IDF said that it struck Hezbollah operatives in Marwahin and carried out an airstrike on a building in Odaisseh.
- The IDF announced the establishment of a new Mountain Brigade, led by Colonel Liron Appleman under the command of the 210th Division, to be sent to the border between Syria and Lebanon.
- The IDF hit a Hezbollah weapons storage near Damascus.
- Five Iranian-backed commanders were killed in airstrikes in Syria according to the Saudi television station AlHadath.

=== 21 March ===
- Four projectiles were fired from Lebanon towards Metula.
- The IDF hit a Hezbollah facility in Kafr Kila.
- IDF airstrikes hit Aita al-Shaab and Yaroun.

=== 22 March ===
- Israeli fighter jets attacked a Hezbollah military compound near Ayta ash Shab.
- An aircraft from Lebanon entered Israeli territory and set off alarms in Western Galilee before it was intercepted by the IDF.

=== 23 March ===
- Two Syrian teenagers were arrested for allegedly spying for Israel in the assassination of Hadi Mustafa.
- The IDF said it struck a building in Kafr Kila after a Hezbollah operative was spotted inside. It also struck Naqoura, Ayta ash-Shab and Khiam.

=== 24 March ===
- Hezbollah claimed responsibility for a drone attack on an Iron Dome missile defense system in Kfar Blum, as well as 60 Katyusha rocket attacks targeting Yoav and the Kaila barracks.
- The IDF struck a car in Baalbek, killing a Syrian national and injuring three others.
- The IDF struck a delivery car in Sawiri allegedly targeting an Islamic Group official, killing a Syrian man.
- Hezbollah announced the death of two of its members.

=== 25 March ===
- Two people, including a Hezbollah member, were killed and three others injured after an IDF strike in Mais al-Jabal.

=== 26 March ===
- Israeli airstrikes against military sites near Ras Baalbek and Hermel killed three Hezbollah militants.
- Hezbollah said it targeted an Israeli military barracks in the Golan Heights with 50 Katyusha rockets.
- Civilians in Rmeich clashed with Hezbollah for allegedly attempting to place rocket launchers in the town.
- The Al-Quds Brigades announced the death of one of its members.
- Hezbollah rocket attacks damaged a home in Betzet and reportedly severed electricity cables.

=== 27 March ===
- At least 7 people, including rescue workers and militia members, were killed in IDF strikes aimed at the Islamic Group's emergency center in Hebbariye.
- An Israeli civilian was killed in Kiryat Shmona after Hezbollah launched dozens of rockets in response to the attack on Hebbariye.
- IDF strikes on Tair Harfa and Naqoura killed five civilians and three militia members.

=== 28 March ===
- A fire broke out at an open area in the Biriya Forest due to fallen shrapnel.
- The IDF said that its Patriot air defense system intercepted a suspicious aerial target approaching northern Israel.
- Hezbollah said it fired rockets at Goren and Shlomi, and the IDF struck the launch sites in response.

=== 29 March ===
- At least 42 people were killed, including 36 Syrian soldiers and six Hezbollah fighters, in an Israeli airstrike on a Hezbollah weapons depot in the Jabrin area of Aleppo.
- An Israeli airstrike in Bazouriyeh killed Ali Abed Akhsan Naim, the deputy commander of Hezbollah's rocket and missiles unit.

=== 30 March ===
- A landmine explosion near a car near Rmeish injured four UNIFIL peacekeepers. Initial Lebanese reports said that an Israeli drone raided the area, but the IDF denied the reports and said the explosion was caused by charges planted by Hezbollah.

=== 31 March ===
- An Israeli drone strike in Kunin killed senior Radwan unit leader Ismail al-Zin, who was responsible for the group's communications and computer operations.
- An Israeli soldier was lightly wounded after Hezbollah launched rockets in the Margaliot and Malkiya areas.
