= Baris =

Baris or Barış may refer to:

== People ==
- Barış, a Turkish given name meaning "Peace".
- Damián Bariš (born 1994), Slovak footballer
- Ozan Baris (born 2004), American tennis player

== Places ==
=== Turkey ===
- Baris in Hellesponto, an ancient city and bishopric, now a Catholic titular see
- Baris (Pisidia), an ancient Lydian city and Roman bishopric, now Isparta and a Catholic titular see
- Barış, Ardeşen, a neighbourhood in Rize Province
- Barış, Kızıltepe, a neighbourhood in Mardin Province
- Barış, Nurhak, a neighbourhood in Kahramanmaraş Province

=== Elsewhere ===
- Baris, Egypt, a town
- Hasmonean Baris, a citadel in Jerusalem in Hasmonean times

== Other uses ==
- Baris dance, a Balinese dance
- Baris (weevil), a true weevil genus
- Baris (ship), an ancient Nile boat type
- Buzz Aldrin's Race Into Space or BARIS, a DOS computer game based on the race to put a man on the Moon

== See also ==
- Barish, a municipality in South Governorate, Lebanon
- Baarish (disambiguation)
