= Deir Kifa =

Deir Kifa دير كيفا Dayr Kifa
- Municipality
- Location within Lebanon
- Coordinates: 33°15′23″N 35°23′54″E
- Grid position: 187/295 PAL
- Country: Lebanon
- Governorate: South Governorate
- District: Tyre District
- Elevation: 500 m (1,600 ft)
- Time zone: UTC+2 (EET)
  - Summer (DST): UTC+3 (EEST)

Deir Kifa (Arabic: دير كيفا, romanized: Dayr Kīfā) is a municipality in Southern Lebanon, located in Tyre District, Governorate of South Lebanon.

== Etymology ==
E. H. Palmer wrote in 1881 that it meant The convent of Kifa. p.n. Kifa is a Syriac Aramaic word that means rock in Arabic and Peter in Greek. It is the title of Saint Simon, son of Jonah, a disciple of Jesus Christ.

== Location ==
Deir Kifa is located in the South Governorate, Tyre District. It is 540 m above sea level and 107 kilometers to the southwest of Beirut, the capital city of Lebanon, or about two hours, and 16 km from the center of its district Tyre. Its population is about five thousand people; about a thousand live in the village, while the rest are distributed in expatriate countries such as Brazil, the United States, Germany, and some Persian Gulf countries. A large number of her sons settled in the capital, Beirut, in order to search for ways of life and work that are missing in the village.

== History ==
In 1875 Victor Guérin noted: "Cisterns hollowed in the rock, and cut stones of ancient appearance, show that this village has succeeded a more ancient one." He further noted that the village contained 150 Metualis, and was situated on a high hill.

In 1881, the PEF's Survey of Western Palestine (SWP) described it as: "A village built of stone, containing about 150 Metawileh and fifty Christians, situated on a hill, and surrounded by fig- trees, olives, and arable land; water supply from two springs and cisterns."

== Demographics ==
In 2014 Muslims made up 98.80% of registered voters in Deir Kifa. 96.35% of the voters were Shiite Muslims.

== Castle ==
In 1875 Guérin noted: "... I climb the slopes cultivated by terraces of a high isolated hill, crowned by the ruins of a castle, called Kala't Maroun. It had been built with regular stones, but of small size. Founded, it is said, by Dhaher el-A'mer, it had succeeded an ancient locality whose name has remained unknown, unless it is necessary to look for it, more or less altered, in that of Maroun. In any case, there is still considerable debris of surrounding walls, semi-circular towers, various buildings, and several large cisterns. A dozen Métualis currently live in the middle of these ruins, which scrub encroaches on from all sides, and they cultivate the plantations of fig and pomegranate trees that cover the flanks and part of the top of the hill."

In 1881, the SWP described the castle to the north of Deir Kifa (which they called Kulat Marun) as: "A ruined Saracenic castle, built by Dhahr el 'Amr, of rectangular form, with round-towers at each angle, and at intervals along the north and south walls. A considerable portion of the walls are still standing; the masonry is all small, with pointed arches. There are no signs of the castle having been built on earlier foundations. They further noted that it contained "about fifty Metawileh. The country is arable, and there are cisterns and a spring near. The Arab houses are built with materials from the castle."

Maroun Castle is historically named after the castle of Maroun, the French Crusader leader who renovated its construction. The castle has seven huge circular towers, some parts of which have collapsed due to time. Deir Kifa Castle was built on a mountainous hill by Aram ibn Yaqoub, adjacent to the agricultural plains. Yaron and Tibnin, and a commercial and military relationship arose between them. Deir Kifa Castle consists of three layers and extends over an area of twenty thousand square meters. It has four springs, and 12 towers, some of which are circular, Aramaic-Canaanite, and some are square-cruciform. Inside are gymnasiums and others for meetings. It contains the king’s palace to the west and vaults that take a square shape. And Christ stayed there. The town of Deir Kifa was considered one of the ten villages that Hiram II, King of Tyre, gave him. The area of the castle is 17,000 square meters and consists of three floors. It contains many cellars, destroyed inns, rooms, multiple stone houses, horse stables, prisons, playgrounds, courtyards, and wheat stores. 365 wells are spread to collect water and 4 springs that dried up years ago. Its wall is 6 to 12 meters high and two meters wide. It has seven corners on each of them, a semi-circular watchtower with a diameter of 8 meters, used for guarding, hunting and defense. It rises 400 m above sea level. It overlooks many towns: from the east, Jebel Maroun and Burj Qalawiya, from the south, Deir Kifa, from the north Srifa and Al-Nafakhiya, and the west, the valleys to the sea.

== Education ==
Educational establishments	Deir Kifa (2005-2006)	Lebanon (2005–2006)
Number of Schools	2	2788
Public School	2	1763
Private School	0	1025
Students schooled in the public schools	474	439905
Students schooled in the private schools	0	471409

== See also ==
- List of Crusader castles

== Bibliography ==
- Conder, C.R.; Kitchener, H.H. (1881). The Survey of Western Palestine: Memoirs of the Topography, Orography, Hydrography, and Archaeology. Vol. 1. London: Committee of the Palestine Exploration Fund.
- Guérin, V. (1880). Description Géographique Historique et Archéologique de la Palestine (in French). Vol. 3: Galilee, pt. 2. Paris: L'Imprimerie Nationale.
- Palmer, E.H. (1881). The Survey of Western Palestine: Arabic and English Name Lists Collected During the Survey by Lieutenants Conder and Kitchener, R. E. Transliterated and Explained by E.H. Palmer. Committee of the Palestine Exploration Fund.
