= Arzoun =

Arzoun ارزون
- Municipality
- Location within Lebanon
- Coordinates: 33°16′58″N 35°22′38″E
- Country: Lebanon
- Governorate: South Governorate
- District: Tyre
- Time zone: GMT +3

Arzoun (Arabic: ارزون, romanized: Ārzūn) or Kerzon, is a municipality in Tyre District, Governorate of South Lebanon.

== History ==
In 1875, Victor Guérin noted "To the east and at the bottom of the hill of Derdarhieh, is the hamlet of Kerzoun. Situated on a low mound, it consists of a few houses, inhabited by five families of Metualis, and has succeeded a more important ancient village."

In 1881, the PEF's Survey of Western Palestine (SWP) described the village (which they called Kerzon), as: "A small village of mud and stone, with a large palm-tree near, containing about fifty Metawileh. It is situated in the valley, with figs and arable land around. There is a spring and cisterns at the village."

== Demographics ==
In 2014, Muslims made up 99.58% of registered voters in Arzoun. 97.46% of the voters were Shiite Muslims.

== Bibliography ==
- Conder, C.R.; Kitchener, H.H. (1881). The Survey of Western Palestine: Memoirs of the Topography, Orography, Hydrography, and Archaeology. Vol. 1. London: Committee of the Palestine Exploration Fund.
- Guérin, V. (1880). Description Géographique Historique et Archéologique de la Palestine (in French). Vol. 3: Galilee, pt. 2. Paris: L'Imprimerie Nationale.
- Palmer, E.H. (1881). The Survey of Western Palestine: Arabic and English Name Lists Collected During the Survey by Lieutenants Conder and Kitchener, R. E. Transliterated and Explained by E.H. Palmer. Committee of the Palestine Exploration Fund.
