= Tyre ruins =

Archaeological sites in Tyre, Lebanon

The ruins of Tyre, are a collection of archaeological sites in the city of Tyre, in Southern Lebanon. Since the 1940s, the Lebanese government has been carrying out extensive excavation campaigns in the area of the Phoenician city in search of the city's antiquities and history. In 1979, the United Nations UNESCO organization included the city of Tyre on the list of World Heritage Sites.

== Archaeological sectors ==
=== Third Sector ===
The center of the third sector - called the Al-Buss site - is to the east of the two previous sectors, and consists of a main street heading from east to west, connecting the city with its eastern suburb. This street was built in the Roman era, and was restored in the Byzantine era at the direction of Alexander the Great. Arcades surround both sides of this street, and it is crossed by a great triumphal arch with three entrances. On its southern side, a canal hangs over aqueducts that were intended to draw the waters of the Ras al-Ain spring into the city. On both sides of the street, large tombs intertwine with funerary structures, marble, limestone and basalt coffins of various shapes, decorations and sculptures. The period of use of this cemetery lasted from the 2nd to the 6th century AD. To the south of the cemeteries, there is a horse chariot race track, some parts of which have been restored. The field is 480 meters long and could accommodate about 20,000 spectators

=== Old markets ===
In the area of the old markets, there stands a khan and a house from the Ottoman era, the mosque of the Shiite community, and the Great Mosque of the Sunni community. Near the market, there is a fishing port known as the Sidonian port which replaced the northern Phoenician port. The road adjacent to the pavement leads to the Christian Quarter, which still retains its alleys and traditional-style buildings. There is a watchtower from the Crusader era in one of the orchards, and another tower near the lighthouse.

=== The Algerian Historical Tower ===
A new archaeological tower was discovered in the vicinity of Jumblatt Square in the city of Tyre. It was named “Al-Jazairien Tower”, a tower referred to in old maps of the city of Tyre dating back to the eighteenth and nineteenth centuries. The 12th-13th centuries AD. Excavators within the site found archaeological layers dating back to more ancient times, including a water channel and rooms of different types.
