= Bedias, Lebanon =

Bedias بدياس Bedyas
- Municipality
- Location within Lebanon
- Coordinates: 33°18′44″N 35°18′02″E
- Grid position: 109/153 L
- Country: Lebanon
- Governorate: South Governorate
- District: Tyre
- Elevation: 620 ft (190 m)
- Time zone: GMT +3

Bedias, Bidias, (Arabic: بدياس, romanized: Bidiyās) is a municipality in the Tyre District in South Lebanon.

== Etymology ==
According to E. H. Palmer in 1881, the name Bidias comes from a personal name.

== History ==
In 1875, Victor Guérin found here a village with 450 Metawileh inhabitants.

He further noted: "'This village has replaced an ancient one, as is proved by the cut stones which are built up in some of the Arab constructions. Five minutes north of this place, and over above the southern bank of the Kasimiyeh, which flows here in a deep ravine, I met with many ancient millstones, broken, and an ancient tomb cut in the rock, having the form of a simple grave, but covered with a great curved block of stone. Thirty minutes west of Bidias is the ruin called Khurbet ed Dar, on a hill overlooking the ravine. It consists of the interior of an enclosure formed of numerous stones roughly squared, with those of a few houses. At a short distance west of this place there are the ruins called Kh. el Meshatah, on a northern hill. They are those of an abandoned Mohammedan village, in which are older ruins, especially those of a building twenty-seven paces in length from west to east, the door of which is still standing. It is surmounted by a magnificent lintel, in the centre of which was once sculptured an ornament, now defaced, which occupied the middle of a sort of rectangular frame, terminating to right and left in the usual dove-tail. This building, which had been afterwards divided into several houses, was built of cut stones very regularly put together."

In 1881, the PEF's Survey of Western Palestine (SWP) described it as: "a village built of stone, on the top of a ridge, surrounded by olive trees and arable land. There is an olive-prcss near the village. The water supply is derived from a large birket and cisterns."

== Demographics ==
In 2014 Muslims made up 99.73% of registered voters in Bedias. 97.91% of the voters were Shiite Muslims.

== Bibliography ==
- Conder, C.R.; Kitchener, H.H. (1881). The Survey of Western Palestine: Memoirs of the Topography, Orography, Hydrography, and Archaeology. Vol. 1. London: Committee of the Palestine Exploration Fund.
- Guérin, V. (1880). Description Géographique Historique et Archéologique de la Palestine (in French). Vol. 3: Galilee, pt. 2. Paris: L'Imprimerie Nationale.
- Palmer, E.H. (1881). The Survey of Western Palestine: Arabic and English Name Lists Collected During the Survey by Lieutenants Conder and Kitchener, R. E. Transliterated and Explained by E.H. Palmer. Committee of the Palestine Exploration Fund.
