= Zalloutieh =

Place in Tyre District, South Governorate, Lebanon

Zalloutieh الزلوطية Az-Zalloutiyah
- Municipality
- Location within Lebanon
- Coordinates: 33°06′34″N 35°14′51″E
- Country: Lebanon
- Governorate: South Lebanon Governorate
- District: Tyre District
- Time zone: UTC+2 (EET)
  - Summer (DST): UTC+3 (EEST)

Zalloutieh or Az-Zalloutiyah (Levantine Arabic: الزلوطية, romanized: az-Zallūṭiyeh) is a municipality in Southern Lebanon, located in Tyre District, Governorate of South Lebanon.

== Etymology ==
According to E. H. Palmer, Kh. Zallûtiyeh means the ruin of pebbles.

== History ==
In 1881, the PEF's Survey of Western Palestine (SWP) found "large heaps of small stones" at Kh. Zallûtiyeh.

== Demographics ==
In 2014 Muslims made up 100% of registered voters in Zalloutieh. 96.38% of the voters were Sunni Muslims.

== Bibliography ==
- Conder, C.R.; Kitchener, H.H. (1881). The Survey of Western Palestine: Memoirs of the Topography, Orography, Hydrography, and Archaeology. Vol. 1. London: Committee of the Palestine Exploration Fund.
- Palmer, E.H. (1881). The Survey of Western Palestine: Arabic and English Name Lists Collected During the Survey by Lieutenants Conder and Kitchener, R. E. Transliterated and Explained by E.H. Palmer. Committee of the Palestine Exploration Fund.
