= Kullar, Nurhak =

Village in Kahramanmaraş Province, Turkey

Kullar
- Neighbourhood
- Location in Turkey
- Coordinates: 37°58′41″N 37°31′0″E
- Country: Turkey
- Province: Kahramanmaraş
- District: Nurhak
- Population (2022): 1,419
- Time zone: UTC+3 (TRT)

Kullar is a neighbourhood of the municipality and district of Nurhak, Kahramanmaraş Province, Turkey. Its population is 1,419 (2022). Before the 2013 reorganisation, it was a town (belde).
