= Tayr Felsay =

Tayr Felsay طير فلسيه
- Municipality
- Location within Lebanon
- Coordinates: 33°18′32″N 35°20′53″E
- Grid position: 113/153 L
- Country: Lebanon
- Governorate: South Governorate
- District: Tyre
- Elevation: 850 ft (260 m)
- Time zone: GMT +3

Tayr Felsay (Arabic: طير فلسيه) is a municipality in Tyre District in Southern Lebanon, located just south of the Litani river and 14 kilometres northeast of Tyre.

== Etymology ==
According to E. H. Palmer, the name means the fortress of the scales or small coins.

== History ==
In 1881, the PEF's Survey of Western Palestine (SWP) described it: "A village built of stone; about 250 Metawileh; on side of hill near the top, with figs and arable land around. There are two springs, and cisterns."

== Demographics ==
In 2014 Muslims made up 99.61% of registered voters in Tayr Felsay. 98.62% of the voters were Shiite Muslims.

== Bibliography ==
- Conder, C.R.; Kitchener, H. H. (1881). The Survey of Western Palestine: Memoirs of the Topography, Orography, Hydrography, and Archaeology. Vol. 1. London: Committee of the Palestine Exploration Fund.
- Palmer, E.H. (1881). The Survey of Western Palestine: Arabic and English Name Lists Collected During the Survey by Lieutenants Conder and Kitchener, R. E. Transliterated and Explained by E.H. Palmer. Committee of the Palestine Exploration Fund.
