= Al-Hanniye =

Al-Hanniye الحنيه Al-Henniye
- Municipality
- Location within Lebanon
- Coordinates: 33°11′08″N 35°13′25″E
- Country: Lebanon
- Governorate: South Governorate
- District: Tyre
- Elevation: 377 ft (115 m)
- Time zone: GMT +3

Al-Hanniye (Levantine Arabic: الحنيه, romanized: al-Ḥanniyeh) is a municipality in Tyre District, Governorate of South Lebanon.

== Etymology ==
According to E. H. Palmer in 1881, the name Kh. el Hanîyeh means "the ruin of the bend".

== History ==
In 1881, the PEF's Survey of Western Palestine (SWP) found at Kh. el Hanîyeh: "A modern farmhouse, occupied by from 15 to 20 Moslems." They also noted "traces of ancient foundations, tombs and cisterns," in addition to the modern house.

== Demographics ==
In 2014, Muslims made up 99.31% of registered voters in Al-Hanniye. 91.55% of the voters were Shiite Muslims.

== Bibliography ==
- Conder, C.R.; Kitchener, H.H. (1881). The Survey of Western Palestine: Memoirs of the Topography, Orography, Hydrography, and Archaeology. Vol. 1. London: Committee of the Palestine Exploration Fund.
- Palmer, E.H. (1881). The Survey of Western Palestine: Arabic and English Name Lists Collected During the Survey by Lieutenants Conder and Kitchener, R. E. Transliterated and Explained by E.H. Palmer. Committee of the Palestine Exploration Fund.
