= Baflay =

Baflay بافليه
- Municipality
- Location within Lebanon
- Coordinates: 33°15′48″N 35°21′54″E
- Country: Lebanon
- Governorate: South Governorate
- District: Tyre
- Time zone: GMT +3

Baflay (Arabic: بافليه) is a municipality in Tyre District, Governorate of South Lebanon.

== History ==
In 1881, the PEF's Survey of Western Palestine (SWP) described the village (which they called Baflei):"A small village, built of stone, containing about seventy Metawileh and thirty Christians, situated on the side of a hill with arable cultivation and a few fig-trees around; water from cisterns and a spring near."

== Demographics ==
In 2014, Muslims made up 99.37% of registered voters in Baflay. 96.56% of the voters were Shiite Muslims.

== Bibliography ==
- Conder, C.R.; Kitchener, H.H. (1881). The Survey of Western Palestine: Memoirs of the Topography, Orography, Hydrography, and Archaeology. Vol. 1. London: Committee of the Palestine Exploration Fund.
- Palmer, E.H. (1881). The Survey of Western Palestine: Arabic and English Name Lists Collected During the Survey by Lieutenants Conder and Kitchener, R. E. Transliterated and Explained by E.H. Palmer. Committee of the Palestine Exploration Fund.
