= Tyre District =

Coordinates: 33.2731°N 35.2169°E

Tyre District قضاء صور
- District
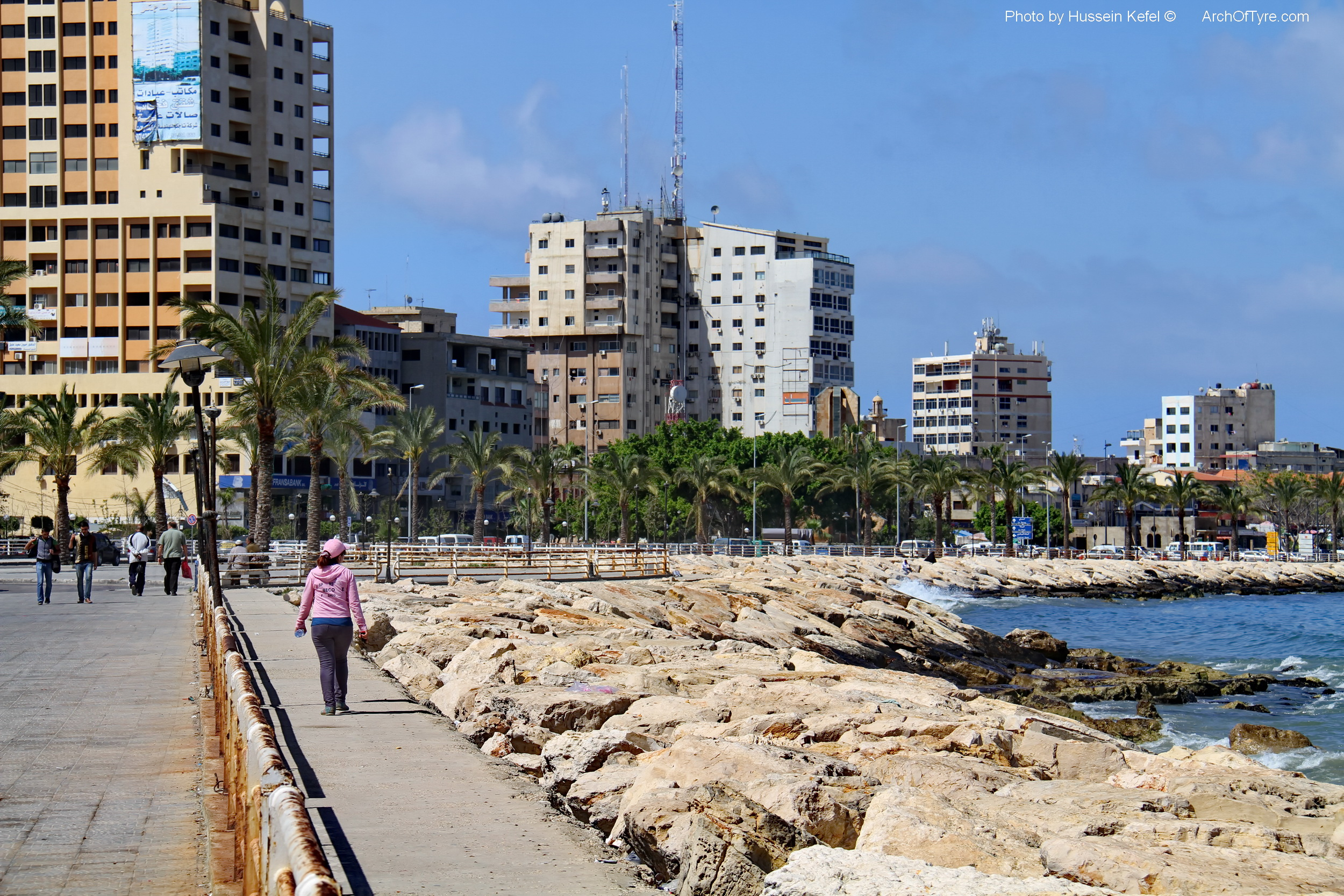
- Tyre

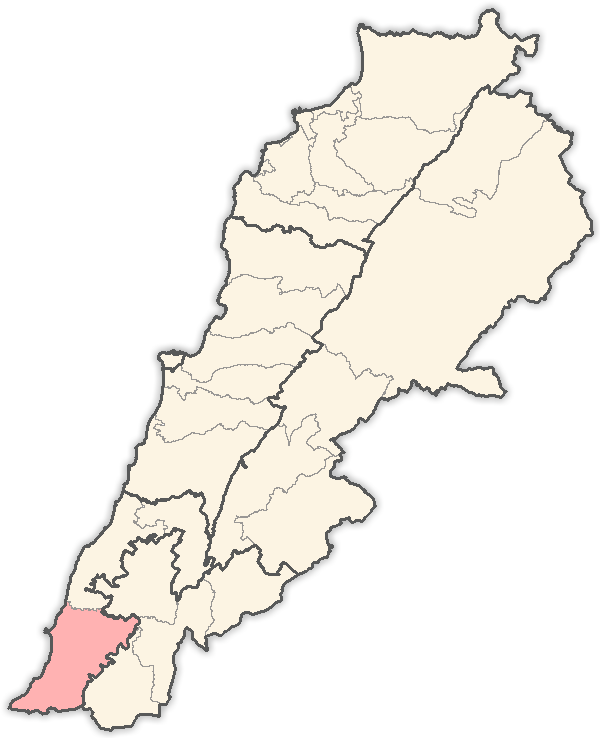
- Location in Lebanon
- Country: Lebanon
- Governorate: South Governorate
- Capital: Tyre

Area
  - Total: 159.9 sq mi (414.1 km^{2})

Population
  - Estimate (31 December 2017): 270,516
- Time zone: UTC+2 (EET)
  - Summer (DST): UTC+3 (EEST)

The Tyre District (Arabic: قضاء صور) is a district in the South Governorate of Lebanon.

== Municipalities ==
The following 72 municipalities are all located in the Tyre District:

- Al-Aabbassiyah
- Aaitit
- Aalma ash-Shaab
- Ain Abu Aabdallah
- Ain az-Zarqa
- Ain Baal
- Arzoun
- Baflay
- Barish
- Al-Basatin
- Batoulay
- Al-Bayyad
- Al-Bazouriyah
- Bedias
- Bestiyat
- Al-Burghuliyah
- Burj ash-Shamali
- Burj Rahal
- Al-Buss
- Al-Bustan
- Debaal
- Deir Aames
- Deir Kifa
- Deir Qanoun an-Naher
- Deir Qanoun Ras al-Ain
- Derdghaya
- Ad-Duhairah
- Al-Halloussiyah
- Al-Hamairi
- Hannaouiyah
- Al-Hanniye
- Jannata
- Jebal al-Bottom
- Al-Jibbain
- Jwaya
- Al-Knaissah
- Maarakah
- Maaroub
- Mahrouna
- Al-Majadel
- Majdal Zoun
- Malikiyat as-Sahel
- Al-Mansouri
- Marwahin
- Mazraat Meshref
- An-Naffakhiyah
- An-Naqoura
- Qana
- Al-Qlailah
- Ar-Ramadiyah
- Ar-Rashidiyah
- Reshknanay
- As-Sammaaiyah
- Seddiqin
- Selaa
- Ash-Shaaitiyah
- Shabriha
- Shamaa
- Shehour
- Ash-Shihabiyah
- Shihin
- Srifa
- Tayr Debba
- Tayr Felsay
- Tayr Harfa
- Toura
- Tyre
- Wadi Jilou
- Yanouh
- Yarin
- Az-Zalloutiyah
- Zibqin

== History ==
=== Ancient history ===
Founded at the start of the third millennium BC, Tyre originally consisted of a mainland settlement and a modest island city that lay a short distance off shore. It became an increasingly important port city in the region in the first millennium BC Phoenicia.

In the 10th century BC, Hiram I, king of Tyre, joined two islets by landfill. Later, he extended the city further by reclaiming a considerable area from the sea. Phoenician expansion began around 815 BC when traders from Tyre founded Carthage in North Africa. Eventually its colonies spread around the Mediterranean and Atlantic, bringing to the city a flourishing maritime trade. Early in the sixth century BC, Nebuchadnezzar II, king of the Neo-Babylonian Empire, laid siege to the walled city for thirteen years. Tyre stood firm, but it was probable that at this time the residents of the mainland city abandoned it for the safety of the island. The conflict ended with Tyre accepting Babylonian rule.

=== Hellenistic period ===
Alexander the Great, in 332 BC, set out to conquer this strategic coastal city during the war between the Greeks and the Persians. Unable to storm the city, he blockaded it for seven months. Tyre held on but the conqueror used the debris of the abandoned mainland city to build a causeway and once within reach of the city's walls, Alexander used his siege engines to batter and finally breach the fortifications.

So enraged at the Tyrians' defense and the number of men lost in the battle, Alexander destroyed half of the city. The town's 30,000 residents were massacred or sold into slavery. Tyre and the whole of ancient Syria fell under Roman rule in 64 BC. Nonetheless, for some time Tyre continued to mint its own silver coins.

=== Roman era ===
The Romans built great important monuments in the city, including an aqueduct, a triumphal arch and the largest hippodrome in antiquity. Christianity appears in the history of Tyre, with the name Tyre being mentioned in the New Testament frequently. During the Byzantine era the Archbishop of Tyre was the primate of all the bishops of Phoenicia. At that time, the city once again became very important in the region, as can be seen in the remains of its buildings and the inscriptions in the necropolis.

=== Islamic era ===
Tyre surrendered to the Islamic armies in 634, the city offered no resistance and continued to prosper under its new rulers, exporting of sugar as well as objects made of pearl and glass making was a good source of income for the city. With the decline of the Abbasid Caliphate, Tyre acquired some independence under the dynasty of the Shia Banu Aqil, vassals of the Fatimid Caliphate. This was a time when Tyre was adorned with fountains and its bazaar were full of different kinds of merchandise including carpets and jewelry of gold and silver.

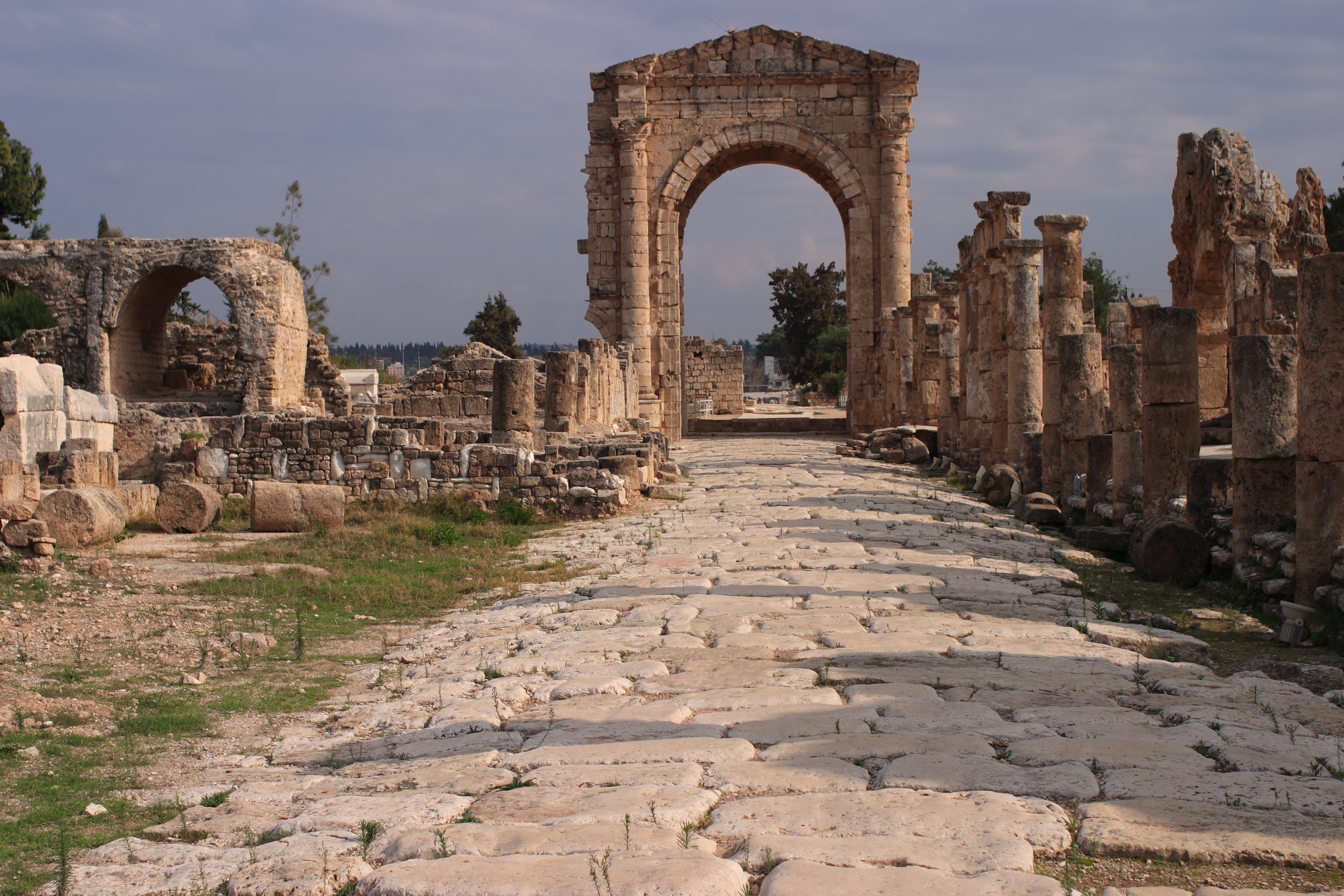
Via Romana, Tyre District

Tyre was conquered by the Crusaders in 1124. After about 180 years of Crusader rule, the Mamluk Sultanate retook the city in 1291, until it fell under the control of the Ottoman Empire at the start of the 16th century.

=== Lebanese era ===
With the end of World War I, Tyre was integrated into the new nation of Lebanon.

Post-World War I and French Mandate (1918–1943):

After World War I, Tyre became part of the French Mandate for Syria and Lebanon under the League of Nations. In 1920, the French made the State of Greater Lebanon, including Tyre. During the 1930s, camps were made for Armenian refugees escaping genocide, especially in El Buss. This time also started archaeological digs, showing the history of Tyre.

Lebanese Independence and Refugees (1943–1970s):

Lebanon got independence in 1943, and Tyre became part of the new country. The city grew as an important port and cultural place. But after the 1948 Arab-Israeli War, many Palestinian refugees came to Tyre. Camps like Burj El Shimali, El Buss, and Rashidieh were made for them. El Buss, which first had Armenian refugees, became mainly for Palestinians.

Civil War and Israeli Occupation (1975–2000):

The Lebanese Civil War (1975–1990) caused much pain for Tyre. There were many fights, including those with Palestinian groups and the Israeli army. Israeli invasions in 1978 and 1982 caused big damage. More attacks happened in 1996 and 2006. Even after Israel left in 2000, problems continued in the area.

Cultural and Historical Importance:

In 1984, UNESCO named Tyre a World Heritage Site because of its historical and archaeological value. The old ruins show its Phoenician past, but problems like city growth, stealing, and pollution made it hard to keep them safe.

21st Century Challenges:

The early 2000s were not easy for Tyre. Economic problems came from wars and Lebanon's crises. Refugees increased the population, with the Tyre area having about 200,000 people by 2016. Issues like coastal erosion from rising sea levels also hurt the city.

The 2024 Conflict:

During the Gaza war the district suffered from the Israeli air strikes against Hezbollah, whom the Israeli army accused of using the villages as launch sites. In October 2024, Tyre was hit by heavy Israeli airstrikes, causing big damage to the city center. Many buildings and historical sites were destroyed. UNESCO worried about harm to the World Heritage ruins. The attacks forced many people to leave. By the end of 2024, Tyre was almost empty, called a "ghost town," with an uncertain future because of the ongoing conflict.

Latest reports published during December 2024, note that the Israeli army keeps demolishing houses within the Tyre district.

2026 Escalation

In April 2026, following a direct military escalation between Israel and Iran, the conflict in Southern Lebanon intensified as the Israel Defense Forces (IDF) began pushing further north. On April 8, 2026, the IDF issued sweeping new evacuation orders for residents of Tyre and other southern regions, instructing the population to move north of the Zahrani River, saying it will ‌strike the area. The military cited planned operations against Hezbollah infrastructure within the city as the reason for the expanded orders, leading to another significant wave of displacement from the district.

== Demographics ==
According to registered voters in 2014:

Year	Christians				Muslims				Druze
Year	Total	Greek Catholics	Maronites	Other Christians	Total	Shias	Sunnis	Alawites	Druze
2014	6.76%	3.50%	1.59%	1.67%	92.94%	84.26%	8.67%	0.01%	0.01%
2022	8.64%	4.19%	2.22%	2.23%	91.36%	82.72%	8.64%	0.00%	0.00%
