= An-Naffakhiyah =

An-Naffakhiyah النفاخية
- Municipality
- Location within Lebanon
- Coordinates: 33°16′15″N 35°23′10″E
- Country: Lebanon
- Governorate: South Governorate
- District: Tyre
- Time zone: GMT +3

An-Naffakhiyah (Arabic: النفاخية, romanized: an-Naffākhiyah) is a municipality in Tyre District, Governorate of South Lebanon.

== History ==
About two thirds of a mile due north of this village (which appears to present no traces of antiquity) Guerin found an ancient site called Kh. Budayeh. The ruins consist of three fragments of monolithic columns with their bases, cisterns, a tank, and a tomb cut in the rock with nine loculi, three at each side and three at the end.

=== Ottoman era ===
In 1875, during the late Ottoman era, Victor Guérin described it: "The village is situated between two deep wadies (one on the north and other on the south), and lies upon the summit of a hill, from which may be seen a large number of villages. The population is 600, all "United Greeks" they are now repairing their humble church. At the foot of the hill is a spring the 'Ain Neffakhiyeh which waters a few gardens."

In 1881, the PEF's Survey of Western Palestine (SWP) described it: "A village, built of stone, containing 200 Christians. There is a modern church in the village, which is situated on the top of a hill, surrounded by figs and arable land. Water supplied from springs in the valley, and three cisterns in the village."

== Demographics ==
In 2014, Christians made up 70.47% and Muslims made up 29.13% of registered voters in An-Naffakhiyah. 61.81% of the voters were Greek Catholics and 28.74% were Shiite Muslims.

== Bibliography ==
- Conder, C.R.; Kitchener, H.H. (1881). The Survey of Western Palestine: Memoirs of the Topography, Orography, Hydrography, and Archaeology. Vol. 1. London: Committee of the Palestine Exploration Fund.
- Guérin, V. (1880). Description Géographique Historique et Archéologique de la Palestine (in French). Vol. 3: Galilee, pt. 2. Paris: L'Imprimerie Nationale.
- Palmer, E.H. (1881). The Survey of Western Palestine: Arabic and English Name Lists Collected During the Survey by Lieutenants Conder and Kitchener, R. E. Transliterated and Explained by E.H. Palmer. Committee of the Palestine Exploration Fund.
