= Ad-Duhairah =

Ad-Duhairah الظهيرة
- Municipality
- Location within Lebanon
- Coordinates: 33°06′25″N 35°13′08″E
- Country: Lebanon
- Governorate: South Governorate
- District: Tyre
- Time zone: GMT +3

Ad-Duhairah (Arabic: الظهيرة, romanized: aḍ-Ḍuhayrah) is a municipality in Southern Lebanon, located in Tyre District, Governorate of South Lebanon.

== Population ==
In 2014 Muslims made up 99.59% of registered voters in Ad-Duhairah. 96.97% of the voters were Sunni Muslims.

The village is in fact inhabited mainly by Bedouin, a small Sunni community in a largely Shi’a border area. Many of them obtained Lebanese citizenship in 1994, under Prime Minister Rafic Hariri.

== History ==
During the 1978 Israeli invasion, Dhayra and nearby Bedouin villages were destroyed and emptied as suspected bases of Palestinian fighters; many residents were displaced to Sidon until the mid-1980s. On the day of the Israeli withdrawal in May 2000, families divided by the border briefly reunited.

== Economy and landmines ==
Residents live mainly from tobacco, olives, honey and home-made preserves. Fields at the edge of the village border minefields along the Blue Line. A women’s cooperative producing preserves was briefly supported by European donors.

== Bonds across the border ==
Dhayra forms a single community with a neighbouring Bedouin hamlet on the Israeli side of the border, whose inhabitants belong to the same tribe. After 2000 withdrawal the Israeli authorities emptied the hamlet, but its former residents are still buried in its cemetery, and relatives from Dhayra follow the funerals from the border fence.
