= Barasat (disambiguation) =

Barasat is a city in India. It may also refer to:

- Barasat Sadar subdivision, an administrative division in North 24 Parganas district in the Indian state of West Bengal
- Barasat I, a community development block in North 24 Parganas district in the Indian state of West Bengal
- Barasat II, a community development block in North 24 Parganas district in the Indian state of West Bengal
- Barasat (Lok Sabha constituency), a parliamentary constituency in North 24 Parganas district in the Indian state of West Bengal
- Barasat (Vidhan Sabha constituency), an assembly constituency in North 24 Parganas district in the Indian state of West Bengal
- Barasat Junction railway station, a railway station located in Sealdah - Bongaon/Hasnabad line
- Barasat College, a degree college in Basirhat
- Barasat Government College, a government college in Barasat
- Barasat Union, Anwara, an administrative body located in Chittagong, Bangladesh

== See also ==
- Barsaat (disambiguation)
