= Al-Majadel =

Al-Majadel المجادل
- Municipality
- Location within Lebanon
- Coordinates: 33°13′45.84″N 35°21′36.36″E
- Grid position: 184/292 PAL
- Country: Lebanon
- Governorate: South Governorate
- District: Tyre District
- Elevation: 310 m (1,020 ft)
- Time zone: UTC+2 (EET)
  - Summer (DST): UTC+3 (EEST)
- Dialing code: +961

Al-Majadel (Arabic: المجادل, romanized: al-Majādil) is a municipality located in the Tyre district (Kaza), which belongs to the South Lebanon governorate (Mohafazah), one of the eight governorates of Lebanon.

== Geography ==
It's 98 kilometers (60.8972 mi) away from Beyrouth (Beirut) the capital of Lebanon. Its elevation is 310 meters (1) (1017.11 ft - 339.016 yd) above sea level. Al-Majadel (Tyr) surface stretches for 225 hectares (2.25 km^{2} - 0.8685 mi^{2})(2).

== History ==
In 1596, it was named as a village, Majadil, in the Ottoman nahiya (subdistrict) of Tibnin under the liwa' (district) of Safad, with a population of 54 households, all Muslim. The villagers paid taxes on agricultural products, such as goats and beehives, in addition to occasional revenues and a fixed sum; a total of 6,450 akçe.

In 1875, Victor Guérin noted: "Here are seen at this day several great wine-presses, each composed of two compartments cut in the rock. One of these presses was lined within by small square cubes, making a mosaic. Here are also fine rock-cut tombs, some containing sarcophagi covered with arched arcosolia and other loculi destined for sarcophagi; and there are other tombs hollowed like simple graves, and covered by heavy blocks more or less squared. There are several broken sarcophagi, and especially a great piece of rock cut as to form a double sarcophagus, the sides of which are sculptured carefully, and ornamented with garlands, discs, trees, rose-work, and a beautiful garland supported in the centre by little columns. There are cisterns and two tanks, one square and the other circular, probably the work of the most ancient people who came to live in this place."

In 1881, the Palestine Exploration Fund's PEF Survey of Palestine described it as "A village, built of stone, with a few ruined houses, containing about 150 Metawileh. It is situated on a hill, surrounded by figs, olives, and arable land. Water supplied from a spring, cisterns, and brisket."

=== Location ===
The village is surrounded by several villages including Deir Intar, Ash-Shihabiyah, Mahrounah, Jwaya.

== Demographics ==
In 2014 Muslims made up 99.75% of registered voters in Al-Majadel. 99.49% of the voters were Shiite Muslims.

== Educational Establishments ==
The table below provides a comparison of public and private schools locally and nationally. It can be used to assess the distribution of students between public and private institutions both locally and nationally. All data provided on education concerning the 2005–2006 school year. Since the publication of more recent figures we will strive to published online.

Educational establishments	Majadel (2005-2006)	Lebanon (2005-2006)
Number of Schools	5	2788
Public School	3	1763
Private School	2	1025
Students schooled in the public schools	623	439905
Students schooled in the private schools	798	471409

=== Economic Activities ===
	Economic Activities (2004)	
Commercial and industrial Activity	Companies with more than five employees	3
	Companies	Not available
Agricultural activity	Crops type	Not available
	Features	Not available
Mining activity	Mines	Not available
	Activities type	Not available
	Operating status	Not available

== Bibliography ==
- Conder, C.R.; Kitchener, H.H. (1881). The Survey of Western Palestine: Memoirs of the Topography, Orography, Hydrography, and Archaeology. Vol. 1. London: Committee of the Palestine Exploration Fund. (p. 96)
- Guérin, V. (1880). Description Géographique Historique et Archéologique de la Palestine (in French). Vol. 3: Galilee, pt. 2. Paris: L'Imprimerie Nationale.
- Hütteroth, W.-D.; Abdulfattah, K. (1977). Historical Geography of Palestine, Transjordan and Southern Syria in the Late 16th Century. Erlanger Geographische Arbeiten, Sonderband 5. Erlangen, Germany: Vorstand der Fränkischen Geographischen Gesellschaft. ISBN 3-920405-41-2.
- Palmer, E.H. (1881). The Survey of Western Palestine: Arabic and English Name Lists Collected During the Survey by Lieutenants Conder and Kitchener, R. E. Transliterated and Explained by E.H. Palmer. Committee of the Palestine Exploration Fund.
- Rhode, H. (1979). Administration and Population of the Sancak of Safed in the Sixteenth Century. Columbia University. Archived from the original on 2016-10-10.
