= Jebal al-Bottom =

Jebal al-Bottom جبال البطم
- Municipality
- Location within Lebanon
- Coordinates: 33°10′35″N 35°17′29″E
- Country: Lebanon
- Governorate: South Governorate
- District: Tyre
- Elevation: 1,300 ft (400 m)
- Time zone: GMT +3

Jebal al-Bottom (Arabic: جبال البطم) is a municipality in Tyre District, Governorate of South Lebanon.

== Etymology ==
According to E. H. Palmer in 1881, the name Jebal el Butm means "the mountains of the terebinth trees".

== History ==
In 1881, the PEF's Survey of Western Palestine (SWP) described Jebal el Butm as: "Stands on a steep hill, and contains about 25 Moslems, occupying the ruins of the ancient place. Water is obtained from cisterns and from 'Ain Yarin, which lies a quarter of a mile to the south-west. Cultivation in valleys round."

== Demographics ==
In 2014, Muslims made up 99.77% of registered voters in Jebal al-Bottom. 98.83% of the voters were Shiite Muslims.

== Bibliography ==
- Conder, C.R.; Kitchener, H.H. (1881). The Survey of Western Palestine: Memoirs of the Topography, Orography, Hydrography, and Archaeology. Vol. 1. London: Committee of the Palestine Exploration Fund.
- Palmer, E.H. (1881). The Survey of Western Palestine: Arabic and English Name Lists Collected During the Survey by Lieutenants Conder and Kitchener, R. E. Transliterated and Explained by E.H. Palmer. Committee of the Palestine Exploration Fund.
