= Chehabiyeh =

Municipality in South Governorate, Lebanon

Chehabiyeh الشهابيّة
- Municipality
- Location within Lebanon
- Coordinates: 33°14′33″N 35°22′55″E
- Grid position: 185/293
- Country: Lebanon
- Governorate: South Governorate
- District: Tyre District
- Time zone: UTC+2 (EET)
  - Summer (DST): UTC+3 (EEST)
- Dialing code: +961

Chehabiyeh or Ash-Shihabiyah (Arabic: الشهابيّة), also spelled ash-Shehabiyah or Chehabiye, formerly Tayr Zibna (Arabic: طيرزبنا), is a municipality located in the South Governorate of Lebanon, located in the Tyre District.

Chehabiyeh faces multiple challenges, including waste management issues and waste burning in local dumps. Iranian-backed political party and militant group Hezbollah is active in the village, and in 2024, a senior member of the Redwan Force was killed in an Israeli airstrike.

== Etymology ==
The town was originally known as "Teir Zinbeh, but was renamed 'Chehabiyeh' in 1968 in honor of former Lebanese President Fouad Chehab. This name change was initiated by Ibrahim Muhiddin Baydoun, a prominent local leader who had a close friendship with Chehab. The official name change was enacted through a law passed by the Lebanese Parliament on January 6, 1968.

Chehab was a member of the noble Chehab dynasty, an Arab family that held significant influence in the region. The dynasty's name itself is derived from the Arabic word "شهاب" (Shihab), which means "shooting star" or "meteor." The name is the English form of the Arabic word "شهابية" (Shahābīyah).

== History ==
In 1596, it was named as a village, Tayr Zabna, in the Ottoman nahiya (subdistrict) of Tibnin under the Liwa Safad, with a population of 16 households, all Muslim. The villagers paid a fixed tax rate of 25% on agricultural products, such as wheat (1300 akçe), barley (280 a.), olive trees (368 a.), goats and beehives (447 a.), in addition to an olive oil press (12 a.) and "occasional revenues" (50 a.).

In 1875, Victor Guérin noted on 'Their Zibna': "This village contains a great number of cut stones, dispersed, coming from an ancient church now destroyed. On the base of a pillar once belonging to this building, I remarked two Greek crosses extremely well sculptured." He estimated that the village had 400 Metawileh inhabitants.

In 1881, the PEF's Survey of Western Palestine (SWP) described Teir Zinbeh as: "A village, built of stone, containing about 300 Metawileh, situated on a ridge, with figs, olives, pomegranates, and arable land round. Water supply from spring and cisterns."

=== Modern era ===
On April 16, 2024, an Israeli Air Force airstrike in the area targeted and eliminated Muhammad Hussein Mustafa Sh'houri, a commander of the rocket and missile unit of Hezbollah's Redwan Force.

== Geography ==
The village is situated at an elevation of approximately 422 meters (1,385 feet) above sea level. Chebabiyeh is close to several other localities, including Kfar Dounin and Selaa. It is part of the Tyre District, which is one of the administrative divisions within the South Governorate.

== Demographics ==
In 2014 Muslims made up 99.63% of registered voters in Chehabiyeh. 99.58% of the voters were Shiite Muslims.

== Services ==
One of the prominent landmarks in the area is the Saint Peter Hospital, which serves as a key healthcare facility for the local population. The hospital is an important institution in the region, providing medical services to residents of Ash-Shehabiyah and neighboring villages.

Furthermore, the village is in proximity to several other localities and landmarks, including the UNP 9-1 military facility located approximately 3.5 kilometers northeast of Ash-Shehabiyah. This facility is part of the United Nations peacekeeping operations in the region.

== Infrastructural challenges ==
Chehabiyeh faces several infrastructural challenges, particularly in the areas of waste management and public services.

One of the critical issues in Chehabiyeh is waste management. The village has struggled with inadequate resources and delayed disbursements from the central government, leading to reliance on open dumping and burning of waste. This practice has significant environmental and health implications for the local population. The municipality has sought support from international agencies and the central government to improve waste management facilities, but consistent financial and technical support remains a challenge.

Water infrastructure in Chehabiyeh has seen some improvements through international aid programs. For instance, the WISE-Lebanon program rehabilitated the Ash-Shehabiyah pump station.

== Bibliography ==
- Conder, C.R.; Kitchener, H.H. (1881). The Survey of Western Palestine: Memoirs of the Topography, Orography, Hydrography, and Archaeology. Vol. 1. London: Committee of the Palestine Exploration Fund.
- Guérin, V. (1880). Description Géographique Historique et Archéologique de la Palestine (in French). Vol. 3: Galilee, pt. 2. Paris: L'Imprimerie Nationale.
- Hütteroth, W.-D.; Abdulfattah, K. (1977). Historical Geography of Palestine, Transjordan and Southern Syria in the Late 16th Century. Erlanger Geographische Arbeiten, Sonderband 5. Erlangen, Germany: Vorstand der Fränkischen Geographischen Gesellschaft. ISBN 3-920405-41-2.
- Palmer, E.H. (1881). The Survey of Western Palestine: Arabic and English Name Lists Collected During the Survey by Lieutenants Conder and Kitchener, R. E. Transliterated and Explained by E.H. Palmer. Committee of the Palestine Exploration Fund.
- Rhode, H. (1979). Administration and Population of the Sancak of Safed in the Sixteenth Century. Columbia University. Archived from the original on 2016-10-10.
