= Mazraat Meshref =

Mazraat Meshref مزرعة مشرف
- Municipality
- Location within Lebanon
- Coordinates: 33°12′33″N 35°20′10″E
- Country: Lebanon
- Governorate: South Governorate
- District: Tyre

Area
  - Total: 4.88 sq mi (12.65 km^{2})
- Elevation: 1,300 ft (400 m)
- Time zone: GMT +3

Mazraat Meshref (Arabic: مزرعة مشرف, romanized: Mazraʿat Meshref) is a municipality in Tyre District, Governorate of South Lebanon.

== Etymology ==
According to E. H. Palmer in 1881, the name Mezrah means "the sown land".

== History ==
"In the Wady Ashur, west of Mezrah, may be seen the most important rock sculpture in the whole of the country round Tyre. It is a cdla or niche cut in the rock, below a great cavern cut out of the wall of the valley. The end of the niche is entirely occupied by a carving, which has an Egyptian appearance. The head-dresses especially of the principal personage, who is represented sitting, are quite those of Egypt, and greatly resemble the pschent. Like all these Egypto-Phoenician sculptures, that of the Wady Ashur has the winged globe. The whole greatly resembles the Egyptian door of Umm el Awamid. Unfortunately the carving is in a very bad state. It has for centuries served as a mark for the Metawileh who traverse the valley, and in hatred of idolatry, think they must fire a shot at it".

In 1881, the PEF's Survey of Western Palestine (SWP) described Mezrah: "A small village, built of stone, on hill-top, spring, birket, and cisterns, with many ruined houses; it contains about 100 Metawileh. There are olives, figs, and arable land around." They further noted: "There are ruined houses, lintels of well-dressed stone, and some cisterns in this village."

== Demographics ==
In 2014, Muslims made up 99.33% of registered voters in Mazraat Meshref. 97.40% of the voters were Shiite Muslims.

== Bibliography ==
- Conder, C.R.; Kitchener, H.H. (1881). The Survey of Western Palestine: Memoirs of the Topography, Orography, Hydrography, and Archaeology. Vol. 1. London: Committee of the Palestine Exploration Fund.
- Palmer, E.H. (1881). The Survey of Western Palestine: Arabic and English Name Lists Collected During the Survey by Lieutenants Conder and Kitchener, R. E. Transliterated and Explained by E.H. Palmer. Committee of the Palestine Exploration Fund.
- Renan, E. (1864). Mission de Phénicie (in French). Paris: Imprimerie impériale.
