= Burj Rahal =

Burj Rahal برج رحال
- Municipality
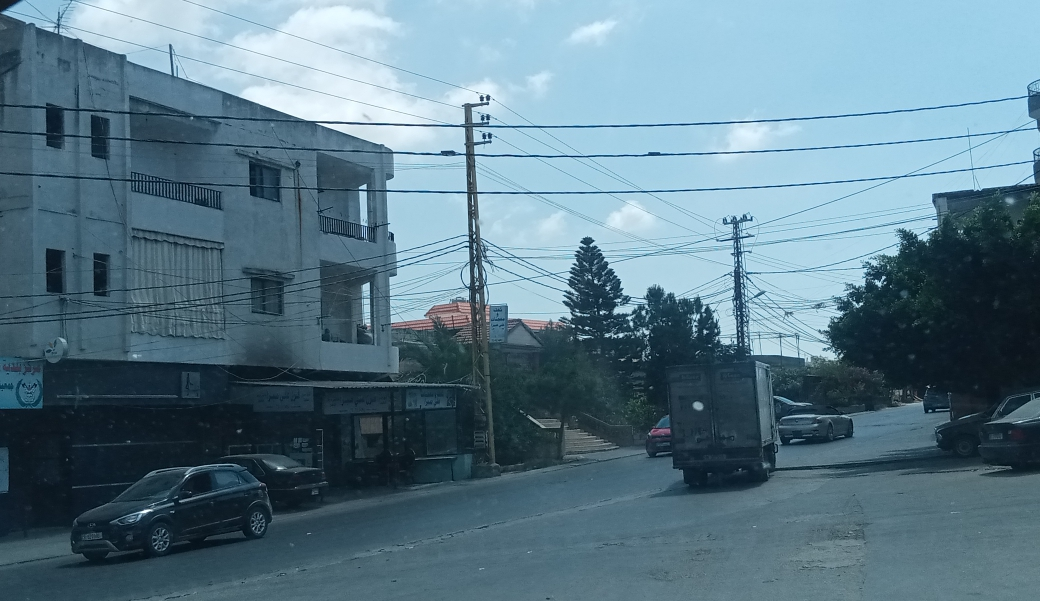
- Burj Rahal main street

- Location within Lebanon
- Coordinates: 33°18′35″N 35°16′57″E
- Grid position: 107/153 L
- Country: Lebanon
- Governorate: South Governorate
- District: Tyre

Population (2015)
  - Total: 2,625
- Time zone: GMT +3

Burj Rahal (Arabic: برج رحال, romanized: Burj Raḥāl) is a municipality in the Tyre District in South Lebanon.

== Etymology ==
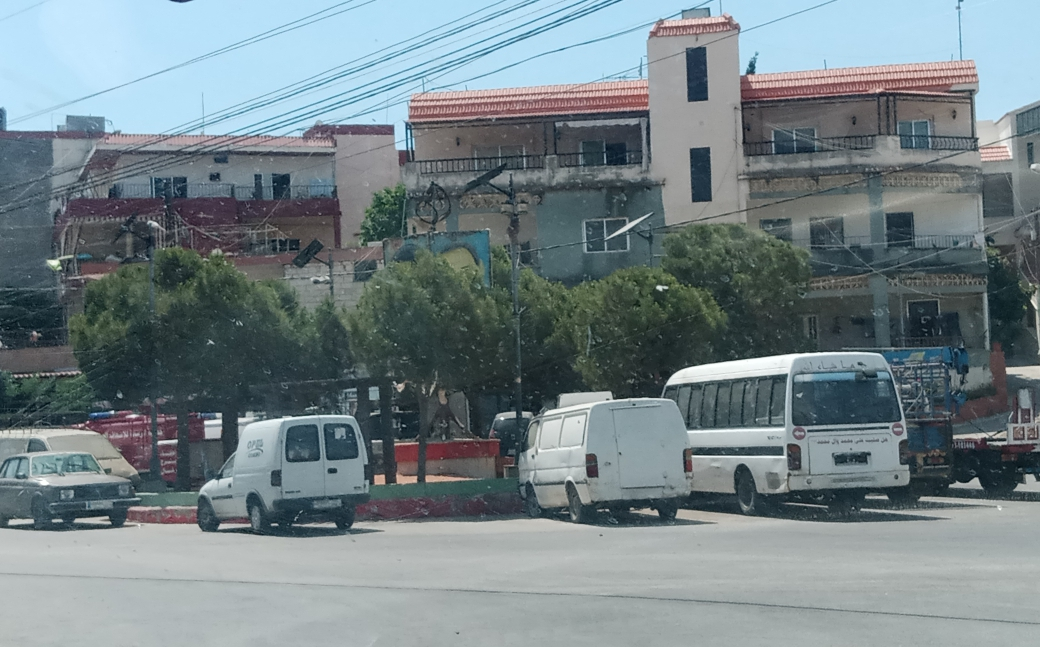
The village's center, "Al Baydar"

According to E. H. Palmer in 1881, the name Burj Rahhal means "the traveller’s tower".

== History ==
In the 1860s, Ernest Renan found here seven singular constructions in a row, three being open, the rest closed. He was also informed that to the north-east of these, there were seven more hidden under grounds. The locals call them the Tombs of the Tyrian Kings, Kubur el Moluk.

In 1875, Victor Guérin found here a village with 400 Metawileh inhabitants. "Here are seen good cut stones lying here and there, taken from an ancient fort."

He further noted: "Ten minutes to the west of the village I observed three good subterranean magazines contiguous and parallel. Partly cut in the rock and partly constructed of cut stones, they measure ten metres in length by a breadth not greater than a metre and a half. They are covered within by a stony cement, in which are inserted fragments of pottery, and arc surmounted by great inclined slabs forming a triangular roof. These are covered over by a layer of earth, so as to form a platform. Several other similar caves are adjoining them, but they are at the present moment closed. Formerly they probably served as oil and wine- cellars, or stores for corn. The place is called Kh. Mahatma."

In 1881, the PEF's Survey of Western Palestine (SWP) described it as: "A large village built of stone, containing 150 Metawileh, on a ridge, surrounded by figs, olives, and arable land. There is a good spring and well near." They further noted: "A few more minutes to the west, Guérin found a ruin called Kh. Kerry el Meserta, where he observed the uprights of grooved oil-presses, broken sarcophagi, mill stones, numerous little cubes of mosaic scattered about, and a great cistern extending under a platform. At twenty minutes' march west-south-west of El Meserta, he observed a hillock with the remains of a ruined village called Kh. Halua. Not far from this place, to the east-north-east, he found a platform surrounded by a wall of large stones, having a great cistern hollowed in the middle. It is called Bir el Mellaha."

== Demographics ==
In 2014 Muslims made up 99.89% of registered voters in Burj Rahal. 99.40% of the voters were Shiite Muslims.

== Bibliography ==
- Conder, C.R.; Kitchener, H.H. (1881). The Survey of Western Palestine: Memoirs of the Topography, Orography, Hydrography, and Archaeology. Vol. 1. London: Committee of the Palestine Exploration Fund.
- Guérin, V. (1880). Description Géographique Historique et Archéologique de la Palestine (in French). Vol. 3: Galilee, pt. 2. Paris: L'Imprimerie Nationale.
- Palmer, E.H. (1881). The Survey of Western Palestine: Arabic and English Name Lists Collected During the Survey by Lieutenants Conder and Kitchener, R. E. Transliterated and Explained by E.H. Palmer. Committee of the Palestine Exploration Fund.
- Renan, E. (1864). Mission de Phénicie (in French). Paris: Imprimerie impériale.
