= Al-Halloussiyah =

Al-Halloussiyah الحلوسية
- Municipality
- Location within Lebanon
- Coordinates: 33°18′29″N 35°19′35″E
- Grid position: 111/152 L
- Country: Lebanon
- Governorate: South Governorate
- District: Tyre
- Elevation: 920 ft (280 m)
- Time zone: GMT +3

Al-Halloussiyah (Arabic: الحلوسية, romanized: al-Ḥalūssiyah) is a municipality in Tyre District in Southern Lebanon, located just south of the Litani River.

== Etymology ==
According to E. H. Palmer, the name could possibly come from the word for "abundant herbage".

== History ==
In 1875, Victor Guérin noted: "This village is divided into two quarters, the lower of which is called Hallusiyeh et Thata, and the upper Hallusiyeh el Foka. The latter occupies the summit of a high hill. The houses of both quarters are rudely built: they may contain about 500 Metawileh."

In 1881, the PEF's Survey of Western Palestine (SWP) described it: "A village, built of stone, divided into two quarters, east and west, with [a] Moslem holy place." They further noted: "The only tradition which connects this village with the past is that a wely consecrated to Neby Mohammed is said to have succeeded an ancient church."

=== Modern era ===
In January 1984 Israel soldiers detained the local Imam and five young men from the village. They then used a bulldozer to demolish the Imam’s house.

On 24 July 2006, during the 2006 Lebanon War, 11 civilians, aged 6 to 86 years of age, were killed by Israeli air-strikes. There were no Hezbollah fighters in the village at the time, according to the villagers.

== Demographics ==
In 2014 Muslims made up 99.56% of registered voters in Al-Halloussiyah. 97.93% of the voters were Shiite Muslims.

== Bibliography ==
- Conder, C.R.; Kitchener, H.H. (1881). The Survey of Western Palestine: Memoirs of the Topography, Orography, Hydrography, and Archaeology. Vol. 1. London: Committee of the Palestine Exploration Fund.
- Guérin, V. (1880). Description Géographique Historique et Archéologique de la Palestine (in French). Vol. 3: Galilee, pt. 2. Paris: L'Imprimerie Nationale.
- HRW (2007). Why They Died: Civilian Casualties in Lebanon During the 2006 War. Human Rights Watch.
- Palmer, E.H. (1881). The Survey of Western Palestine: Arabic and English Name Lists Collected During the Survey by Lieutenants Conder and Kitchener, R. E. Transliterated and Explained by E.H. Palmer. Committee of the Palestine Exploration Fund.
