= Deir Aames =

Deir Aames دير عامص
- Municipality
- Location within Lebanon
- Coordinates: 33°12′03″N 35°20′10″E
- Grid position: 181/289 PAL
- Country: Lebanon
- Governorate: South Governorate
- District: Tyre District
- Highest elevation: 400 m (1,300 ft)
- Time zone: UTC+2 (EET)
  - Summer (DST): UTC+3 (EEST)
- Dialing code: +9617

Deir Aames (Levantine Arabic: دير عامص, romanized: Deir ʿĀmeṣ) is a municipality in Southern Lebanon, located in Tyre District, Governorate of South Lebanon.

== Etymology ==
According to E. H. Palmer, the name means "the convent of Amis."

== History ==
In 1243, during the Crusader era, Deir Aames (called Derreme, or Dairrhamos) belonged to Venice.

=== Ottoman era ===
In the early 1860s, Ernest Renan noted: "'At Deir Amis there is a large basin of great stones, and a portion of wall which seems of Crusading times. At the church there is a drawing like the stone of Aitit. As the stone of Deir Amis is certainly Christian, so must also be that of Aitit."

In 1875, Victor Guérin found the village to be inhabited by Metuali families. He further noted: "numerous ruined houses, a fragment of a column in the interior of a small mosque, cut stones scattered over the ground, cisterns cut in the rock, a tank partly built and partly rock-cut. On an ancient lintel is carved a double cross in a circle."

In 1881, the PEF's Survey of Western Palestine (SWP) described it: "A village, built of stone, situated on a ridge, with olives and arable land around, containing about 100 Metawileh; water from cisterns."

== Demographics ==
In 2014 Muslims made up 99.94% of registered voters in Deir Aames. 99.58% of the voters were Shiite Muslims.

== Bibliography ==
- Conder, C.R.; Kitchener, H.H. (1881). The Survey of Western Palestine: Memoirs of the Topography, Orography, Hydrography, and Archaeology. Vol. 1. London: Committee of the Palestine Exploration Fund.
- Guérin, V. (1880). Description Géographique Historique et Archéologique de la Palestine (in French). Vol. 3: Galilee, pt. 2. Paris: L'Imprimerie Nationale.
- Palmer, E.H. (1881). The Survey of Western Palestine: Arabic and English Name Lists Collected During the Survey by Lieutenants Conder and Kitchener, R. E. Transliterated and Explained by E.H. Palmer. Committee of the Palestine Exploration Fund.
- Pringle, D. (1997). Secular buildings in the Crusader Kingdom of Jerusalem: an archaeological Gazetter. Cambridge University Press. ISBN 0521 46010 7.
- Renan, E. (1864). Mission de Phénicie (in French). Paris: Imprimerie impériale.
- Röhricht, R. (1893). (RRH) Regesta regni Hierosolymitani (MXCVII-MCCXCI) (in Latin). Berlin: Libraria Academica Wageriana.
