= Jannata =

Jannata جناتا Jennata
- Municipality
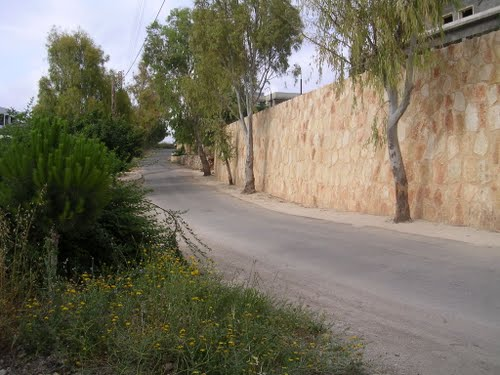
- Road in Jannata

- Location within Lebanon
- Coordinates: 33°17′10″N 35°19′10″E
- Grid position: 110/150 L
- Country: Lebanon
- Governorate: South Governorate
- District: Tyre District
- Elevation: 250 m (820 ft)
- Time zone: UTC+2 (EET)
  - Summer (DST): UTC+3 (EEST)

Jannata (Arabic: جناتا, romanized: Jannātā) is a municipality in Southern Lebanon, located in the Tyre District, Governorate of South Lebanon.

== Etymology ==
According to E. H. Palmer, the name comes from Jennat, garden.

== History ==
In 1875, Victor Guérin found the village, (which he called Djennateh), to have 60 Metawileh inhabitants. He further noted: "The village contains a number of ruined houses. A little mosque is partly built of ancient materials."

In 1881, the PEF's Survey of Western Palestine (SWP) described it: "A small village of stone and mud, containing about 100 Moslems. […] It lies low, on arable land. The water is supplied by two wells in the village."

== Demographics ==
In 2014 Muslims made up 99.24% of registered voters in Jannata. 97.70% of the voters were Shiite Muslims.

== Bibliography ==
- Conder, C.R.; Kitchener, H.H. (1881). The Survey of Western Palestine: Memoirs of the Topography, Orography, Hydrography, and Archaeology. Vol. 1. London: Committee of the Palestine Exploration Fund.
- Guérin, V. (1880). Description Géographique Historique et Archéologique de la Palestine (in French). Vol. 3: Galilee, pt. 2. Paris: L'Imprimerie Nationale.
- Palmer, E.H. (1881). The Survey of Western Palestine: Arabic and English Name Lists Collected During the Survey by Lieutenants Conder and Kitchener, R. E. Transliterated and Explained by E.H. Palmer. Committee of the Palestine Exploration Fund.
