= Reshknanay =

Reshknanay رشكنانيه
- Municipality
- Location within Lebanon
- Coordinates: 33°11′23″N 35°19′22″E
- Grid position: 180/288 PAL
- Country: Lebanon
- Governorate: South Lebanon Governorate
- District: Tyre District
- Elevation: 170 m (560 ft)
- Time zone: UTC+2 (EET)
  - Summer (DST): UTC+3 (EEST)
- Dialing code: +9617

Reshknanay or Rishknaniyah (Arabic: رشكنانيه) is a municipality in Southern Lebanon, located in Tyre District, Governorate of South Lebanon.

== Etymology ==
E. H. Palmer wrote that the name comes from a personal name.

== History ==
In 1875, during the late Ottoman era, Victor Guérin noted it as a small village of Metualis.

In 1881, the PEF's Survey of Western Palestine (SWP) described it: "A small village built of stone, containing about 100 Metawileh, on side of valley, surrounded by figs, olives, and arable land. Water is obtained from cisterns and the spring of 'Ain el Tozeh." They further noted: "The rocks to the west of the village are cut into wine-presses, cisterns, etc.; probably an ancient place."

== Demographics ==
In 2014 Muslims made up 99.64% of registered voters in Reshknanay. 96.07% of the voters were Shiite Muslims.

== Bibliography ==
- Conder, C.R.; Kitchener, H. H. (1881). The Survey of Western Palestine: Memoirs of the Topography, Orography, Hydrography, and Archaeology. Vol. 1. London: Committee of the Palestine Exploration Fund.
- Guérin, V. (1880). Description Géographique Historique et Archéologique de la Palestine (in French). Vol. 3: Galilee, pt. 2. Paris: L'Imprimerie Nationale.
- Palmer, E.H. (1881). The Survey of Western Palestine: Arabic and English Name Lists Collected During the Survey by Lieutenants Conder and Kitchener, R. E. Transliterated and Explained by E.H. Palmer. Committee of the Palestine Exploration Fund.
