= Barsaat =

Barsaat may refer to:

- Barsaat (1949 film), a Bollywood film
- Barsaat (1995 film), a Bollywood film
- Barsaat (2005 film), a Bollywood film

== See also ==
- Barasat (disambiguation)
- Baarish (disambiguation)
- Barsaat Ki Raat, 1960 film by P. L. Santoshi
- Barsaat Ki Ek Raat, 1981 Indian film by Shakti Samanta
