= Toura, Lebanon =

Toura طورا
- Municipality
- Location within Lebanon
- Coordinates: 33°17′37″N 35°17′52″E
- Grid position: 108/151 L
- Country: Lebanon
- Governorate: South Governorate
- District: Tyre
- Elevation: 1,300 ft (400 m)
- Time zone: GMT +3

Toura (Arabic: طورا, romanized: Ṭūrā) is a municipality in the Tyre District in South Lebanon, located 9 kilometres northeast of Tyre.

== Etymology ==
According to E. H. Palmer in 1881, the name Torah comes from "flowing water".

== History ==
In 1875, Victor Guérin found here 450 Metawileh. He further noted that the village occupied "the summit of a hill entirely covered with fig-trees."

In 1881, the PEF's Survey of Western Palestine (SWP) described it: "A village of mud and stone, situated on the top of a hill, and surrounded by figs, olives, and arable land. There are a spring and cisterns. It contains about 200 Metawileh."

== Demographics ==
In 2014 Muslims made up 99.89% of registered voters in Toura. 99.36% of the voters were Shiite Muslims.

== Bibliography ==
- Conder, C.R.; Kitchener, H.H. (1881). The Survey of Western Palestine: Memoirs of the Topography, Orography, Hydrography, and Archaeology. Vol. 1. London: Committee of the Palestine Exploration Fund.
- Guérin, V. (1880). Description Géographique Historique et Archéologique de la Palestine (in French). Vol. 3: Galilee, pt. 2. Paris: L'Imprimerie Nationale.
- Palmer, E.H. (1881). The Survey of Western Palestine: Arabic and English Name Lists Collected During the Survey by Lieutenants Conder and Kitchener, R. E. Transliterated and Explained by E.H. Palmer. Committee of the Palestine Exploration Fund.
