= Debaal =

Debaal دبعال
- Municipality
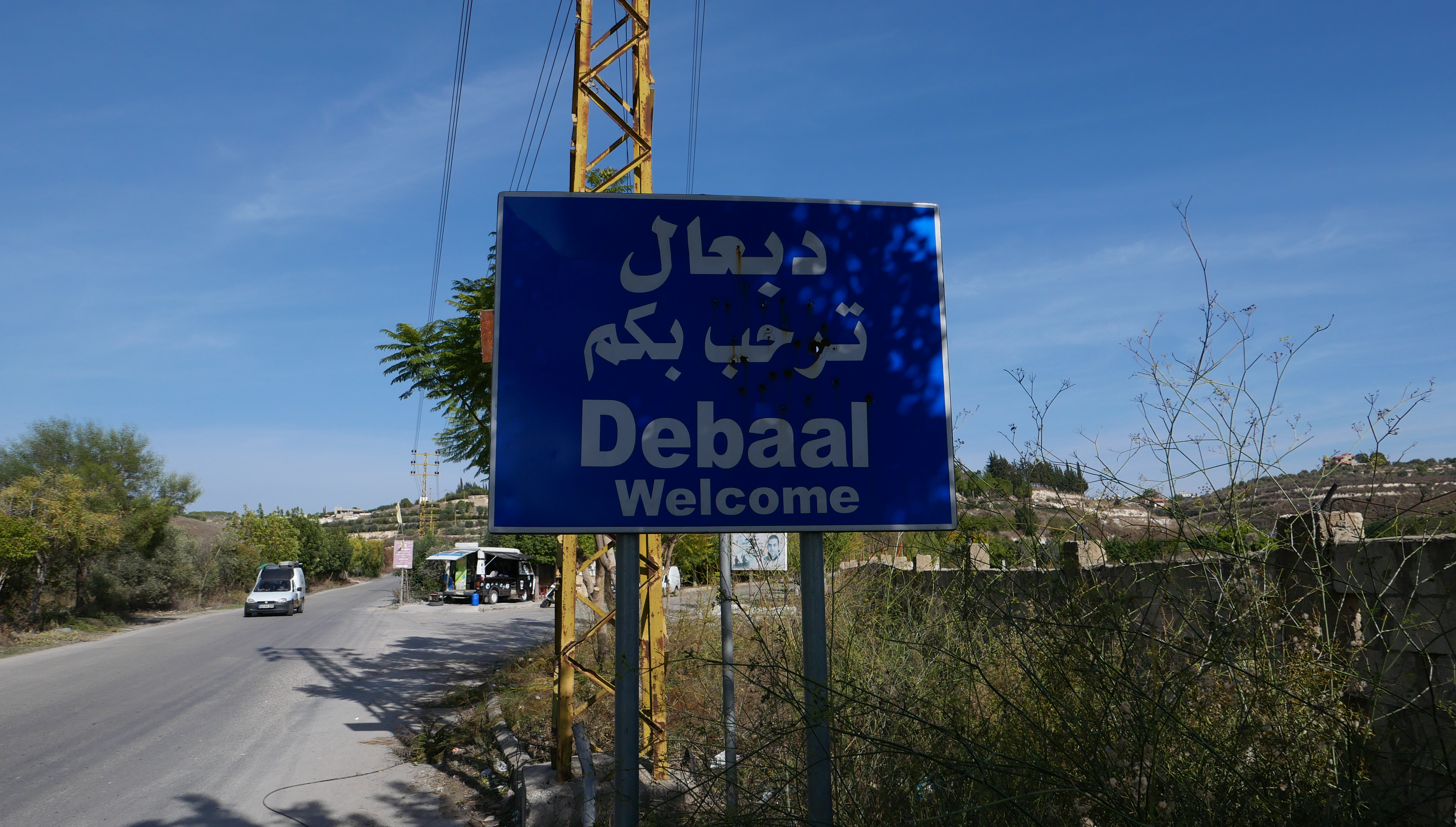
- Entrance to Debaal

- Location within Lebanon
- Coordinates: 33°15′06″N 35°20′56″E
- Country: Lebanon
- Governorate: South Governorate
- District: Tyre
- Elevation: 280 m (920 ft)
- Time zone: +2
  - Summer (DST): +3

Debaal (Arabic: دبعال) or Deb’aal is a municipality located at the Tyre District, in the South Governorate, Lebanon. It is located north of Jwaya and south of Baflay, 22 km east of Tyre.

== History ==
In 1875, Victor Guérin visited, and wrote that the village, inhabited by Metawileh, sits atop a hill surrounded with terraces bearing olive, fig, and tobacco crops. Guérin compared Debaal's significance unfavorably to that of Maarakeh, a village he visited earlier.

In 1881, the PEF's Survey of Western Palestine (SWP) described it: "A village, built of stone; about 100 Metawileh; situated on a hill, surrounded by fig-trees, olives, and arable land; water supply from spring and cisterns."

== Demographics ==
In 2014 Muslims made up 99.63% of registered voters in Debaal. 98.50% of the voters were Shiite Muslims.

== Archaeology ==
In 1875, Victor Guérin took note of an adjacent ancient necropolis, which he described as "still fairly well-preserved". Guérin examined seven funerary vaults, each containing multiple loculi, some with rectangular shapes and others with arched ceilings, a few of which still housed skeletal remains.

=== Hypogeum ===
In 1961, a hypogeum, a large underground burial chamber, was excavated by the Lebanese Antiquities Service at Debaal. Dating to the late 1st and early 2nd centuries AD, the tomb's construction extended until the early 3rd century AD. It did not appear to be linked to any nearby settlement, and whether it was part of a larger cemetery complex remains uncertain.

The hypogeum features painted decorations depicting garlands of fruits and flowers, rosettes, pediments, and columns adorning the walls around the burial niches (loculi). Within the tomb, archaeologists discovered a total of thirty-four coffin burials, including twenty-nine lead, four stone, and one terracotta coffin. Evidence of iron nails in some loculi suggested the use of wooden coffins. Six of the coffins were identified as child burials based on their smaller size. One sarcophagus contained a Greek inscription dated to AD 136.

Excavations yielded a total of 123 artifacts across thirty-three loculi; glass vessels, lamps, and coins were abundant compared to regional averages.

== Bibliography ==
- Conder, C.R.; Kitchener, H.H. (1881). The Survey of Western Palestine: Memoirs of the Topography, Orography, Hydrography, and Archaeology. Vol. 1. London: Committee of the Palestine Exploration Fund.
- Guérin, V. (1880). Description Géographique Historique et Archéologique de la Palestine (in French). Vol. 3: Galilee, pt. 2. Paris: L'Imprimerie Nationale.
- Palmer, E.H. (1881). The Survey of Western Palestine: Arabic and English Name Lists Collected During the Survey by Lieutenants Conder and Kitchener, R. E. Transliterated and Explained by E.H. Palmer. Committee of the Palestine Exploration Fund.
