= Batoulay =

Batoulay باتوليه
- Municipality
- Location within Lebanon
- Coordinates: 33°13′29″N 35°15′15″E
- Country: Lebanon
- Governorate: South Governorate
- District: Tyre
- Time zone: GMT +3

Batoulay (Arabic: باتوليه, romanized: Bātūlayah, locally Bātūlay, formerly: Beit Hulei (meaning "the house of Hûlei"), is a municipality in Tyre District, Governorate of South Lebanon.

== History ==
In 1875 Victor Guérin visited the village (which he called Beit Oula) and described it: "As for the village, it consists of about thirty houses fairly well built and surrounded by a perimeter wall. Some beautiful ashlars, remains of an ancient building, are noticed here and there. Its population is 150 Metualis. As I walk through it quickly, I observe a pool partly dug in the rock, two presses, also ancient and made in the rock, and a sarcophagus still equipped with its lid".

In 1881, the PEF's Survey of Western Palestine (SWP) described it as "A village built of stone, with a few mud houses, containing 100 Metawileh, situated on rising ground, surrounded by figs and arable land. There are no ruins of importance; a few cisterns. The water supply is from 'Ain Furawiyat".

== Demographics ==
In 2014, Muslims made up 99.49% of registered voters in Batoulay. 99.27% of the voters were Shiite Muslims.

== Bibliography ==
- Conder, C.R.; Kitchener, H.H. (1881). The Survey of Western Palestine: Memoirs of the Topography, Orography, Hydrography, and Archaeology. Vol. 1. London: Committee of the Palestine Exploration Fund.
- Guérin, V. (1880). Description Géographique Historique et Archéologique de la Palestine (in French). Vol. 3: Galilee, pt. 2. Paris: L'Imprimerie Nationale.
- Palmer, E.H. (1881). The Survey of Western Palestine: Arabic and English Name Lists Collected During the Survey by Lieutenants Conder and Kitchener, R. E. Transliterated and Explained by E.H. Palmer. Committee of the Palestine Exploration Fund.
