= Ağcaşar, Nurhak =

Village in Kahramanmaraş Province, Turkey

Ağcaşar
- Neighbourhood
- Location within Turkey
- Coordinates: 38°4′42″N 37°20′57″E
- Country: Turkey
- Province: Kahramanmaraş
- District: Nurhak
- Population (2022): 242
- Time zone: UTC+3 (TRT)

Ağcaşar is a neighbourhood of the municipality and district of Nurhak, Kahramanmaraş Province, Turkey. Its population is 242 (2022). The village is inhabited by Kurds of the Şemsikan and Sinemili tribes.
