= Yanouh, Tyre =

Yanouh يانوح
- Municipality
- Location within Lebanon
- Coordinates: 33°15′34″N 35°18′16″E
- Country: Lebanon
- Governorate: South Governorate
- District: Tyre
- Elevation: 690 ft (210 m)
- Time zone: GMT +3

Yanouh (Arabic: يانوح, romanized: Yānūḥ) is a municipality in Tyre District, Governorate of South Lebanon.

== Etymology ==
According to E. H. Palmer in 1881, the name Yânûh is one of two possible "Yanoah of the Bible".

== History ==
In 1881, the PEF's Survey of Western Palestine (SWP) described Yanuh: "A village built of stone, containing 150 Metawileh, on a hill-top, surrounded by figs, olives, and pomegranates, and arable land. A spring and cisterns are found here."

== Demographics ==
In 2014, Muslims made up 99.28% of registered voters in Yanouh. 98.66% of the voters were Shiite Muslims.

== Bibliography ==
- Conder, C.R.; Kitchener, H.H. (1881). The Survey of Western Palestine: Memoirs of the Topography, Orography, Hydrography, and Archaeology. Vol. 1. London: Committee of the Palestine Exploration Fund.
- Palmer, E.H. (1881). The Survey of Western Palestine: Arabic and English Name Lists Collected During the Survey by Lieutenants Conder and Kitchener, R. E. Transliterated and Explained by E.H. Palmer. Committee of the Palestine Exploration Fund.
