= Umutlu, Nurhak =

Village in Kahramanmaraş Province, Turkey

Umutlu
- Neighbourhood
- Location in Turkey
- Coordinates: 37°52′7″N 37°18′51″E
- Country: Turkey
- Province: Kahramanmaraş
- District: Nurhak
- Population (2022): 58
- Time zone: UTC+3 (TRT)

Umutlu is a neighbourhood of the municipality and district of Nurhak, Kahramanmaraş Province, Turkey. Its population is 58 (2022). The village is inhabited by Kurds.
