= Al-Burghuliyah =

Al-Burghuliyah البرغلية
- Municipality
- Location within Lebanon
- Coordinates: 33°18′43″N 35°14′28″E
- Country: Lebanon
- Governorate: South Governorate
- District: Tyre
- Elevation: 148 ft (45 m)
- Time zone: GMT +3

Al-Burghuliyah (Arabic: البرغلية, romanized: al-Burghuliyah) is a municipality in Southern Lebanon, located in Tyre District, Governorate of South Lebanon.

== Demographics ==
In 2014 Muslims made up 99.88% of registered voters in Al-Burghuliyah. 96.26% of the voters were Sunni Muslims.
