= Al-Hamairi =

Al-Hamairi الحميري
- Municipality
- Location within Lebanon
- Coordinates: 33°17′40″N 35°21′5″E
- Country: Lebanon
- Governorate: South Governorate
- District: Tyre

Area
  - Total: 0.60 sq mi (1.55 km^{2})
- Elevation: 1,080 ft (330 m)
- Time zone: GMT +3

Al-Hamairi (Arabic: الحميري, romanized: al-Ḥamayrī) is a municipality in Tyre District, Governorate of South Lebanon.

== Etymology ==
According to E. H. Palmer in 1881, the name Humeireh means "the red patch".

== History ==
In 1881, the PEF's Survey of Western Palestine (SWP) described Humeireh: "Village of mud and rough stones, containing about 200 Moslems, on the top of a ridge, surrounded by figs, olives, and arable land; water from cisterns."

== Demographics ==
In 2014, Muslims made up 99.20% of registered voters in Al-Hamairi. 97.76% of the voters were Shiite Muslims.

== Bibliography ==
- Conder, C.R.; Kitchener, H.H. (1881). The Survey of Western Palestine: Memoirs of the Topography, Orography, Hydrography, and Archaeology. Vol. 1. London: Committee of the Palestine Exploration Fund.
- Palmer, E.H. (1881). The Survey of Western Palestine: Arabic and English Name Lists Collected During the Survey by Lieutenants Conder and Kitchener, R. E. Transliterated and Explained by E.H. Palmer. Committee of the Palestine Exploration Fund.
