= Al-Bayyad =

Al-Bayyad البياض Al-Baiyad
- Municipality
- Location within Lebanon
- Coordinates: 33°12′15″N 35°19′42″E
- Grid position: 180/290 PAL
- Country: Lebanon
- Governorate: South Governorate
- District: Tyre District
- Time zone: UTC+2 (EET)
  - Summer (DST): UTC+3 (EEST)
- Dialing code: +9617

Al-Bayyad (Arabic: البياض, romanized: al-Bayyāḍ) is a municipality in Southern Lebanon, located in Tyre District, Governorate of South Lebanon.

== Etymology ==
E. H. Palmer wrote that the name means "the white spot".

== History ==
In 1881, during the late Ottoman era, the PEF's Survey of Western Palestine (SWP) described it: "A village, built of stone, with many ruined houses [..], containing about 100 Metawileh, situated on hill-top, surrounded by fig-trees, olives, and arable land; water supplied from cisterns."

They further noted: "There are many ruined houses at this village, and a lintel with three crosses upon it, the centre being the largest. Foundations of rough-hewn stones of some building."

== Demographics ==
In 2014 Muslims made up 99.58% of registered voters in Al-Bayyad. 99.17% of the voters were Shiite Muslims.

== Bibliography ==
- Conder, C.R.; Kitchener, H.H. (1881). The Survey of Western Palestine: Memoirs of the Topography, Orography, Hydrography, and Archaeology. Vol. 1. London: Committee of the Palestine Exploration Fund.
- Palmer, E.H. (1881). The Survey of Western Palestine: Arabic and English Name Lists Collected During the Survey by Lieutenants Conder and Kitchener, R. E. Transliterated and Explained by E.H. Palmer. Committee of the Palestine Exploration Fund.
