= Nurhak =

- District and municipality
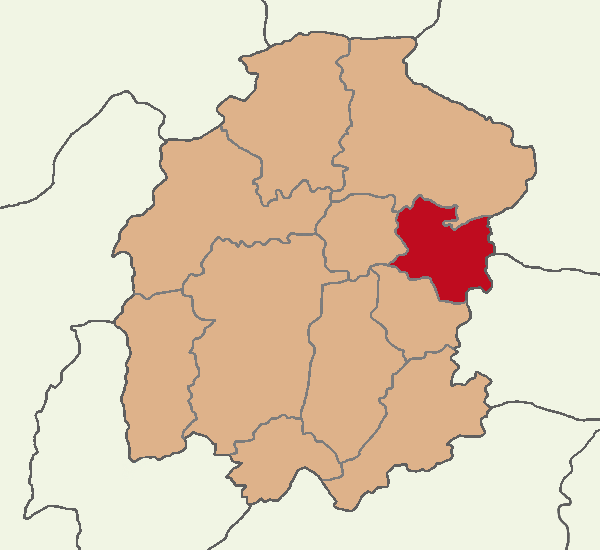
- Map showing Nurhak District in Kahramanmaraş Province

- Location in Turkey
- Coordinates: 37°57′57″N 37°25′38″E
- Country: Turkey
- Province: Kahramanmaraş

Government
  - Mayor: İlkay BEY (CHP)
- Area: 1,028 km^{2} (397 sq mi)
- Population (2022): 12,257
  - Density: 11.92/km^{2} (30.88/sq mi)
- Time zone: UTC+3 (TRT)
- Postal code: 46370
- Area code: 0344
- Website: www.nurhak.bel.tr

Nurhak (Kurdish: Nûrheq) is a municipality and district of Kahramanmaraş Province, Turkey. Its area is 1,028 km^{2}, and its population is 12,257 (2022).

== Composition ==
There are 16 neighbourhoods in Nurhak District:

- Ağcaşar
- Alçiçek Değirmenkaya
- Barış
- Biçim
- Eskiköy
- Gürsel
- Hüyük
- Karaçar
- Karşıyaka
- Kıyılar
- Kullar
- Pınarbaşı
- Seyitaliler
- Tatlar
- Umutlu
- Yenimahalle

== Demography ==
The district is populated by Kurds and Turks.

Settlement	Ethnicity
Nurhak (Nûrheq)	Kurdish and Turkish
Ağcaşar	Kurdish
Barış (Derwend)	Kurdish
Umutlu (Tevekkelî)	Kurdish
