= Baarish =

Baarish may refer to:

- Baarish (film), a 1957 Indian Hindi-language film
- "Baarish" (song), a Hindi-language song from the 2017 Indian film Half Girlfriend
- Baarish (web series), a 2019 Indian Hindi-language web series by Ekta Kapoor for the OTT platform ALT Balaji

== See also ==
- Baris (disambiguation)
- Barsaat (disambiguation)
- Boarisch, a group of Upper German languages
