= Ar-Ramadiyah =

Ar-Ramadiyah الرمادية
- Municipality
- Location within Lebanon
- Coordinates: 33°11′58″N 35°16′33″E
- Country: Lebanon
- Governorate: South Governorate
- District: Tyre
- Elevation: 920 ft (280 m)
- Time zone: GMT +3

Ar-Ramadiyah (Arabic: الرمادية, romanized: ar-Ramādiyah) is a municipality in Tyre District, Governorate of South Lebanon.

== Etymology ==
According to E. H. Palmer in 1881, the name Rumeidieh means "the ashy or ash-coloured".

== History ==
In 1881, the PEF's Survey of Western Palestine (SWP) described Rumeidieh as: " A well-built village, with cisterns, containing about 150 Moslems, surrounded by groves of figs. Water from 'Ain el Kuneiseh."

== Demographics ==
In 2014, Muslims made up 99.73% of registered voters in Ar-Ramadiyah. 98.91% of the voters were Shiite Muslims.

== Bibliography ==
- Conder, C.R.; Kitchener, H.H. (1881). The Survey of Western Palestine: Memoirs of the Topography, Orography, Hydrography, and Archaeology. Vol. 1. London: Committee of the Palestine Exploration Fund.
- Palmer, E.H. (1881). The Survey of Western Palestine: Arabic and English Name Lists Collected During the Survey by Lieutenants Conder and Kitchener, R. E. Transliterated and Explained by E.H. Palmer. Committee of the Palestine Exploration Fund.
