= Barış, Nurhak =

Village in Kahramanmaraş Province, Turkey

Barış
- Neighbourhood
- Location in Turkey
- Coordinates: 38°0′33″N 37°18′34″E
- Country: Turkey
- Province: Kahramanmaraş
- District: Nurhak
- Population (2022): 576
- Time zone: UTC+3 (TRT)

Barış is a neighbourhood of the municipality and district of Nurhak, Kahramanmaraş Province, Turkey. Its population is 576 (2022). Before the 2013 reorganisation, it was a town (belde). The village is inhabited by Kurds.
