= Barish =

Barish باريش
- Municipality
- Location within Lebanon
- Coordinates: 33°16′23″N 35°21′14″E
- Grid position: 183/297 PAL
- Country: Lebanon
- Governorate: South Governorate
- District: Tyre District
- Elevation: 350 m (1,150 ft)
- Time zone: UTC+2 (EET)
  - Summer (DST): UTC+3 (EEST)

Barish (Arabic: باريش, romanized: Bārīsh) is a municipality in Southern Lebanon, located in Tyre District, Governorate of South Lebanon.

== Etymology ==
E. H. Palmer wrote in 1881 that the name Barish meant "abounding in herbage".

Anis Freiha said that the origin of the name is Syriac: “The house of the chief and the lieutenant colonel, and he mentioned that there is another possibility that it is from the Hebrew bero ?sh: cypress, and in the Aramaic bero ?sh, and in the Syriac.”

== Location ==
Barish is located in the South Governorate, Tyre District. It is 350 m above sea level and 89 kilometers to the southwest of Beirut, the capital city of Lebanon, or about an hour and a half, and 16 km from the center of its district Tyre. Its land area is 404 hectares. The number of its registered residents is 5000, expatriates 1500.

== History ==
In 1875 Victor Guérin found that it had 300 Metawileh inhabitants. He further noted: "It is surrounded by plantations of fig trees, olive trees and tobacco; some houses and a small mosque were partly built with ancient materials, either found on site or from Broukhai".

In 1881, the PEF's Survey of Western Palestine (SWP) described Barish as: "A village, built of stone, containing about 200 Christians, situated on the top of a hill, surrounded by gardens, figs, and arable land; water supplied from cisterns in the village and spring near."

== Demographics ==
In 2014 Muslims made up 99.42% of registered voters in Barish. 98.26% of the voters were Shiite Muslims.

== Education ==
Educational establishments	Barish (2005-2006)	Lebanon (2005–2006)
Number of Schools	1	2788
Public School	1	1763
Private School	0	1025
Students schooled in the public schools	431	439905
Students schooled in the private schools	0	471409

== Bibliography ==
- Conder, C.R.; Kitchener, H.H. (1881). The Survey of Western Palestine: Memoirs of the Topography, Orography, Hydrography, and Archaeology. Vol. 1. London: Committee of the Palestine Exploration Fund.
- Guérin, V. (1880). Description Géographique Historique et Archéologique de la Palestine (in French). Vol. 3: Galilee, pt. 2. Paris: L'Imprimerie Nationale.
- Palmer, E.H. (1881). The Survey of Western Palestine: Arabic and English Name Lists Collected During the Survey by Lieutenants Conder and Kitchener, R. E. Transliterated and Explained by E.H. Palmer. Committee of the Palestine Exploration Fund.
