= Al-Bustan, Lebanon =

Al-Bustan البستان
- Municipality
- Location within Lebanon
- Coordinates: 33°06′00″N 35°15′27″E
- Country: Lebanon
- Governorate: South Governorate
- District: Tyre

Government
  - Mayor: Adnan Al-Ahmad
- Time zone: GMT +3

Al-Bustan or Boustane (Arabic: البستان, romanized: al-Bustān) is a municipality in Southern Lebanon, located in Tyre District, Governorate of South Lebanon.

== Demographics ==
In 2014 Muslims made up 99.70% of registered voters in Al-Bustan. 98.00% of the voters were Sunni Muslims. The number of year-round residents of the town in 2024 was estimated to be about 1,300, though the population gets as high as 3,000 during certain parts of the year.
