= Bazouriyeh =

Bazouriyeh البازورية Al-Bazouriyeh
- Municipality
- Location within Lebanon
- Coordinates: 33°15′14″N 35°16′18″E
- Grid position: 175/295 PAL
- Country: Lebanon
- Governorate: South Governorate
- District: Tyre District
- Founded by: Ibrahim Y. Nehme

Government
- Elevation: 175 m (574 ft)

Population
  - Total: 20,000
- Time zone: UTC+2 (EET)
  - Summer (DST): UTC+3 (EEST)
- Dialing code: +9617

Bazouriyeh (Arabic: البازورية, romanized: al-Bāzūriyah) is a municipality in Southern Lebanon, located in Tyre District, Governorate of South Lebanon.

== Etymology ==
According to E. H. Palmer, the name means "producing pot-herbs".

== History ==
In 1596, it was named as a village, al-Bazuri, in the Ottoman nahiya (subdistrict) of Tibnin under the liwa' (district) of Safad, with a population of 22 households, all Muslim. The villagers paid a fixed tax rate of 25% on agricultural products, such as wheat, barley, summer crops, fruit trees, goats and beehives, in addition to occasional revenues; a total of 4,243 akçe.

In 1881, the PEF's Survey of Western Palestine (SWP) described it: "A village built of stone, containing 300 Metawileh, situated on a ridge. One oil-press and one rock-cut cistern are the only antiquities. Water is obtained from a spring half a mile to the west."

== Demographics ==
In 2014 Muslims made up 99.55% of registered voters in Bazouriyeh. 97.81% of the voters were Shiite Muslims.

== Notable people ==
Bazouriyeh was the ancestral home of Hassan Nasrallah.

== Bibliography ==
- Conder, C.R.; Kitchener, H.H. (1881). The Survey of Western Palestine: Memoirs of the Topography, Orography, Hydrography, and Archaeology. Vol. 1. London: Committee of the Palestine Exploration Fund.
- Hütteroth, W.-D.; Abdulfattah, K. (1977). Historical Geography of Palestine, Transjordan and Southern Syria in the Late 16th Century. Erlanger Geographische Arbeiten, Sonderband 5. Erlangen, Germany: Vorstand der Fränkischen Geographischen Gesellschaft. ISBN 3-920405-41-2.
- Palmer, E.H. (1881). The Survey of Western Palestine: Arabic and English Name Lists Collected During the Survey by Lieutenants Conder and Kitchener, R. E. Transliterated and Explained by E.H. Palmer. Committee of the Palestine Exploration Fund.
- Rhode, H. (1979). Administration and Population of the Sancak of Safed in the Sixteenth Century. Columbia University. Archived from the original on 2019-04-20.
