= Deir Qanoun Ras al-Ain =

Deir Qanoun Ras al-Ain Ras al-Ain
- Municipality
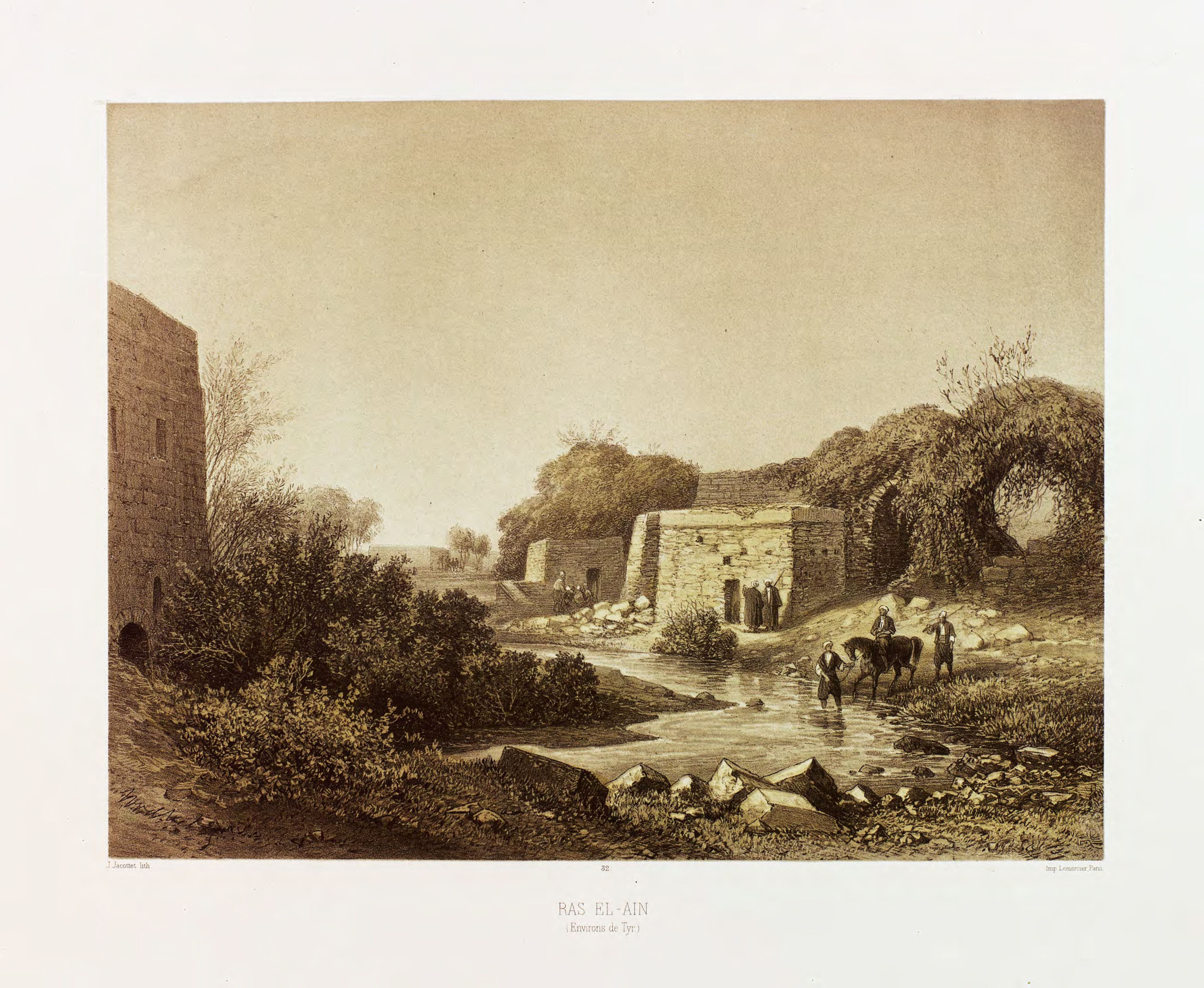
- Ras al-Ain, ca 1851, by van de Velde

- Location in Lebanon
- Coordinates: 33°13′41″N 35°13′02″E
- Country: Lebanon
- Governorate: South Governorate
- District: Tyre District
- Time zone: UTC+2 (EET)
  - Summer (DST): UTC+3 (EEST)

Deir Qanoun Ras al-Ain (Arabic: دير قانون رأس العين, romanized: Dayr Qānūn Raʾs al-ʿAyn, Lit. Fountain-head; The head of the Spring) is a place abounding with immense fountains, with reservoirs and aqueducts 6 kilometers (3.7 mi) south of Tyre, and ca. 77 kilometers (48 mi) south of Beirut, in the South Governorate (Liban-Sud), in the municipality of Deir Qanoun Ras al-Ain. The place lies in a very green and fertile plain, about one kilometer from the sea coast. It is a popular tourist destination, owing to its artesian wells fed by underground springs and collected in stone reservoirs that have been maintained through the ages.

== History ==
Ras al-Ain has been the main source of water for ancient Tyre since Phoenician days. One of the reservoirs fed the arched aqueducts of the Roman period, and which once stretched all the way to Tyre. Remains of these aqueducts, exhibiting strong and excellent masonry, with round arches and a continuous cornice above them, can still be seen today, and a short stretch of the original aqueduct is still used today in Tyre's present-day waterworks.

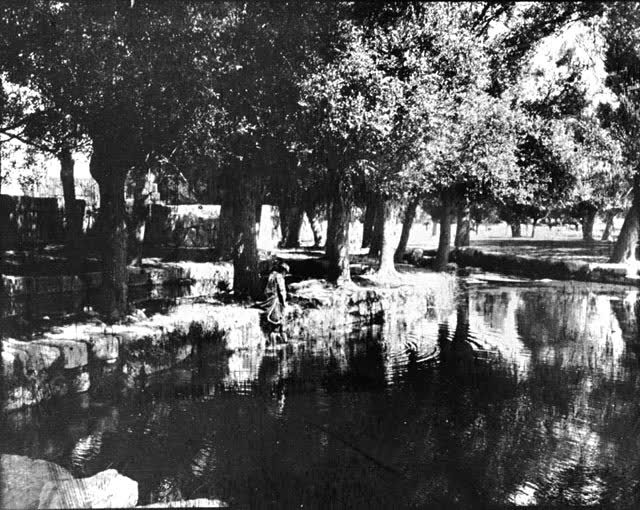
Ras al-Ain in 1900 (Gertrude Bell Archive, Newcastle University)

A reference to this place is mentioned in the 3rd century Mosaic of Rehob as Rosh Mayya (Fountain-head).

In 1881, the PEF's Survey of Western Palestine (SWP) described it: "A village built of stone, containing about 100 Metawileh, in the plain, surrounded by gardens of figs, pomegranates, mulberries, and olives. Five mills in the village, and near, in working order,a good many ruined."

They further noted about the waterways: This is the spring-head which supplied ancient Tyre by means of a long aqueduct. The springs are enclosed in four strongly-built reservoirs, as at Tabghah, by means of which the water is raised to a height of from fifteen to twenty feet, in order that an aqueduct with a slight fall should be able to carry it to the neighbourhood of Tyre. The walls of these reservoirs are of large well-dressed ashlar-work, and vary in thickness. The stones are joined and coated on the inside with strong cement. The principal reservoir is octagonal in shape, with sides of irregular length. Its diameter measures sixty-six feet, and it is twenty-five feet above the ground. The retaining walls are very thick, and show traces of modern repairs in one part. They have so gentle a slope that it is not difficult to ride up on to the broad border eight feet wide round the spring."

== Demographics ==
In 2014 Muslims made up 99.69% of registered voters in Deir Qanoun Ras al-Ain. 99.28% of the voters were Shiite Muslims.

== See also ==
- Tyre District

== Bibliography ==
- Conder, C.R.; Kitchener, H.H. (1881). The Survey of Western Palestine: Memoirs of the Topography, Orography, Hydrography, and Archaeology. Vol. 1. London: Committee of the Palestine Exploration Fund.
- Conder, C.R.; Kitchener, H.H. (1883). The Survey of Western Palestine: Memoirs of the Topography, Orography, Hydrography, and Archaeology. Vol. 3. London: Committee of the Palestine Exploration Fund. (p. 432)
- Guérin, V. (1880). Description Géographique Historique et Archéologique de la Palestine (in French). Vol. 3: Galilee, pt. 2. Paris: L'Imprimerie Nationale. (pp. 203-208)
- Palmer, E.H. (1881). The Survey of Western Palestine: Arabic and English Name Lists Collected During the Survey by Lieutenants Conder and Kitchener, R. E. Transliterated and Explained by E.H. Palmer. Committee of the Palestine Exploration Fund.
- Robinson, E.; Smith, E. (1841). Biblical Researches in Palestine, Mount Sinai and Arabia Petraea: A Journal of Travels in the year 1838. Vol. 3. Boston: Crocker & Brewster.
- Safrai, Z. (1977). "Marginal Notes on the Rehob Inscription". Zion: Historical Society of Israel (in Hebrew). 1977: 1–23.
