= Yarin =

Yarin يارين
- Municipality
- Location within Lebanon
- Coordinates: 33°06′23″N 35°14′01″E
- Grid position: 172/279 PAL
- Country: Lebanon
- Governorate: South Governorate
- District: Tyre

Area
  - Water: 0 sq mi (0 km^{2})
- Elevation: 1,380 ft (420 m)

Population (2015)
  - Total: 2,115
- Time zone: GMT +3

Yarin (Arabic: يارين, romanized: Yārīn) is a municipality in the Tyre District in southern Lebanon, located 19 kilometres south of Tyre.

== Etymology ==
According to E. H. Palmer in 1881, the name Khŭrbet Yarin comes from "the ruin of Yârîn, p.n."

== History ==
There are remains of a Byzantine church SE of the village site, and a "Tower or fortlet on hill top surrounded by enclosure wall built of large ashlar masonry".

=== Ottoman era ===
In 1875, Victor Guérin found here 'On the east extends a sort of avenue, formerly bordered by important buildings. One remarks especially the remains of a great edifice measuring forty-five paces in length from west to east by twenty-two in breadth from north to south. It was built of finely cut stones lying one upon the other with cement, and terminated at the east in three apses, the largest of which, that in the centre, is still partly upright. It was once an ancient church divided into three naves by monolithic columns, some undulated fragments of which are lying on the ground . ..... Small cubes of mosaic in red, white, and black still adhere to the soil in several places.' He further noted: "A large cistern located near this monument to the west was built with great care. The ruins of Yarin are now inhabited by only three or four Bedouin families, who graze their animals or cultivate a few plots of land."

In 1881, the PEF's Survey of Western Palestine (SWP) found here: “Large ruin; some small-sized drafted stones with bosses left rough, two stones bearing Latin crosses; remains of modern walls and heaps of stones; two rock-cut tombs with square-headed kokim; loculi. In the more eastern one a figure of a human head is roughly cut out of the rock in the first chamber of the tomb, out of which two square loculi open.”

=== Lebanese Civil War ===
In July 1977 during the Lebanese Civil War, Phalangist forces led by Elie Hobeika carried out a massacre of Palestinians in the village, during which some 30 civilians were shot. During the civil war in the village was attacked several times by the Christian forces.

The village was occupied by the IDF during the First Lebanon War in June 1982, and was under Israeli control until May 2000, when the IDF withdrew from Lebanon.

In 1993, a Lebanese citizen who came to visit his parents in the village was kidnapped by the State of Israel, on suspicion of passing information to Hezbollah. He was held in Israel for 9 years and finally released to his home.

=== 2024 Israel-Hezbollah conflict ===
At the end of 2023 and the beginning of 2024, the IDF carried out several attacks against Hezbollah positions and people, in the village and in the region.

== Demographics ==
In 2014 Muslims made up 99.78% of registered voters in Yarin. 96.70% of the voters were Sunni Muslims.

== Bibliography ==
- Conder, C.R.; Kitchener, H.H. (1881). The Survey of Western Palestine: Memoirs of the Topography, Orography, Hydrography, and Archaeology. Vol. 1. London: Committee of the Palestine Exploration Fund.
- Guérin, V. (1880). Description Géographique Historique et Archéologique de la Palestine (in French). Vol. 3: Galilee, pt. 2. Paris: L'Imprimerie Nationale.
- Palmer, E.H. (1881). The Survey of Western Palestine: Arabic and English Name Lists Collected During the Survey by Lieutenants Conder and Kitchener, R. E. Transliterated and Explained by E.H. Palmer. Committee of the Palestine Exploration Fund.
- Pringle, D. (1997). Secular buildings in the Crusader Kingdom of Jerusalem: an archaeological Gazetter. Cambridge University Press. ISBN 0521 46010 7.
