= Selaa =

Selaa سلعا Silaa
- Municipality
- Location within Lebanon
- Coordinates: 33°15′15″N 35°22′48″E
- Grid position: 185/295 PAL
- Country: Lebanon
- Governorate: South Governorate
- District: Tyre
- Elevation: 1,440 ft (440 m)
- Time zone: GMT +3

Selaa, Silaa, (Arabic: سلعا, romanized: Silʿā) is a municipality in the Tyre District in Southern Lebanon.

== Etymology ==
According to E. H. Palmer, Silảh comes from "the crevasse".

== History ==
In 1875, Victor Guérin found here 250 Metuali inhabitants. He further noted: "Here I found an ancient press, the lid of a sarcophagus with acroteria, and a broken sarcophagus, at one of whose ends is a projection resembling an altar. Near it is a great grave with room for two bodies, with a partition wall left in the rock; and beside this an enormous detached block, hollowed out for two bodies, and resting on a surface purposely planed.'

Close to Silah, Guérin also found the ruins of a small village, completely destroyed, known as Kh. Fenian.

In 1881, the PEF's Survey of Western Palestine (SWP) described it as: "a village, built of stone and of good materials, containing about 200 [..] Metawileh, on hill, with figs, olives, and arable land. Water from cisterns and a spring near." They further noted that it had a perennial spring, built up with masonry, and that it was "an ancient site; there is a terraced hill; there are six sarcophagi and two olive-presses near the village."

== Demographics ==
In 2014 Muslims made up 99.65% of registered voters in Selaa. 98.56% of the voters were Shiite Muslims.

== Bibliography ==
- Conder, C.R.; Kitchener, H.H. (1881). The Survey of Western Palestine: Memoirs of the Topography, Orography, Hydrography, and Archaeology. Vol. 1. London: Committee of the Palestine Exploration Fund.
- Guérin, V. (1880). Description Géographique Historique et Archéologique de la Palestine (in French). Vol. 3: Galilee, pt. 2. Paris: L'Imprimerie Nationale.
- Palmer, E.H. (1881). The Survey of Western Palestine: Arabic and English Name Lists Collected During the Survey by Lieutenants Conder and Kitchener, R. E. Transliterated and Explained by E.H. Palmer. Committee of the Palestine Exploration Fund.
