= Derdghaya =

Derdghaya دردغيا
- Municipality
- Location within Lebanon
- Coordinates: 33°16′50″N 35°22′35″E
- Country: Lebanon
- Governorate: South Governorate
- District: Tyre

Area
  - Land: 1.45 sq mi (3.76 km^{2})
- Elevation: 1,350 ft (410 m)
- Time zone: GMT +3

Derdghaya (Arabic: دردغيا, romanized: Dirdghayā) is a municipality in Tyre District, Governorate of South Lebanon.

== History ==
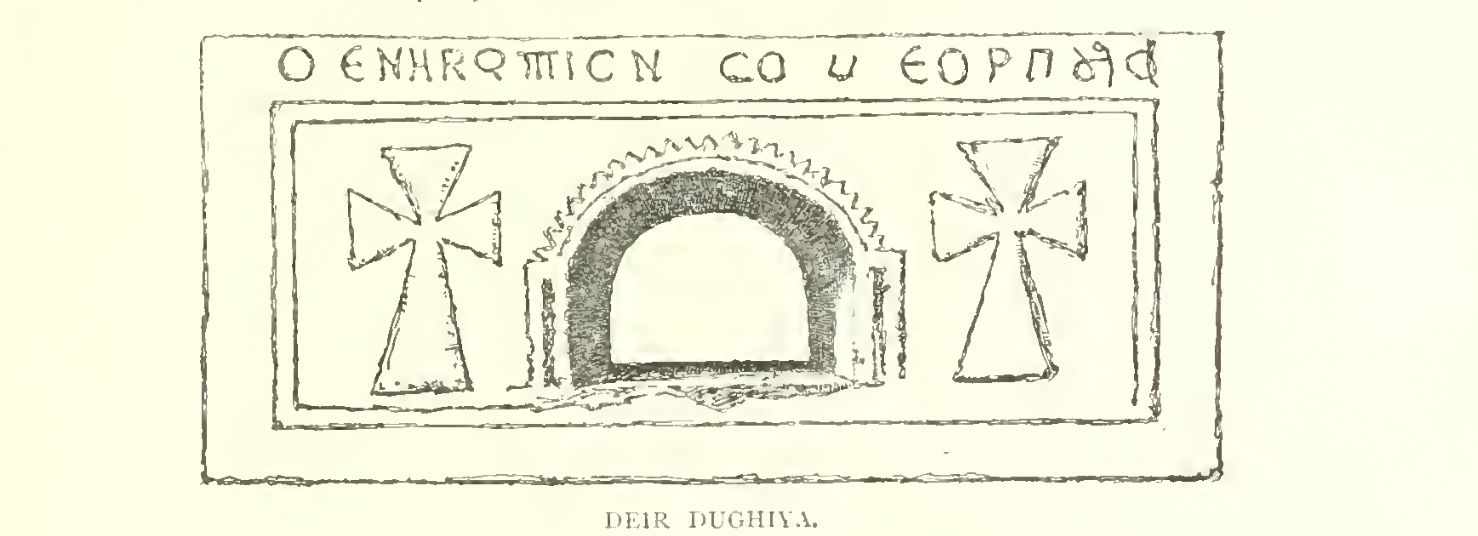
Old lintel from Derdghaya

The Survey of Western Palestine (SWP) noted here: "a stone, forming the lintel of the modern church of the village ; it is ancient, having been brought from Deir Abu Dei." A Greek inscription was found in this village in the year 1860. It was over the door of the church of St. George.

=== Ottoman era ===
In 1875, Victor Guérin noted "I arrive at Derdarhieh, a village built on the slopes and on the top of a hill. It has 600 inhabitants, all Greeks united. A number of houses are newly built. Above the door of a small church has been depicted an arched niche, between two crosses, and on the same stone is a line of Greek characters, now very faded, which M. Renan, according to a copy given to him in 1860 by M. Durighello, vice-consul of Saida, believes he can restore.[...] In the same village I was shown a large sepulchral basin in terracotta, recently unearthed and at one of the corners of which on the outer rim there are two small signs which appear, on the outer rim, two small signs which seem to be emblems of the goddess Astarte.

In 1881, the PEF's Survey of Western Palestine (SWP) described the village (which they called Deir Dughiah; meaning "the convent of Dughiya") as: "A village built of stone, containing about 300 Christians; contains a modern Christian church [...] ; situated on a hill, surrounded by fig-trees and arable land; water supplied by rock-cut cisterns."

=== Modern era ===
On 9 October 2024, the Israel Defense Forces (IDF) conducted an airstrike on a Melkite church in the village of Derdghaya, in Southern Lebanon, as part of the 2024 Israeli invasion of Lebanon. The airstrike killed at least eight people inside the church. The IDF also hit the house of a priest and the parish offices.

== Demographics ==
In 2014, Christians made up 95.38% of registered voters in Derdghaya. 75.27% of the voters were Greek Catholics and 16.26% were Maronite Catholics.

== Bibliography ==
- Conder, C.R.; Kitchener, H.H. (1881). The Survey of Western Palestine: Memoirs of the Topography, Orography, Hydrography, and Archaeology. Vol. 1. London: Committee of the Palestine Exploration Fund.
- Guérin, V. (1880). Description Géographique Historique et Archéologique de la Palestine (in French). Vol. 3: Galilee, pt. 2. Paris: L'Imprimerie Nationale.
- Palmer, E.H. (1881). The Survey of Western Palestine: Arabic and English Name Lists Collected During the Survey by Lieutenants Conder and Kitchener, R. E. Transliterated and Explained by E.H. Palmer. Committee of the Palestine Exploration Fund.
- Renan, E. (1864). Mission de Phénicie (1865–1874). Paris.
