= Baris (Pisidia) =

Ancient city in Pisidia

Coordinates: 37°51′27″N 30°20′22″E

Baris (Ancient Greek: Βάρις) was a town of ancient Pisidia inhabited during Roman and Byzantine times. During the Byzantine period, Baris became the seat of a bishopric within the province of Pisidia. Although the residential diocese later disappeared, it survives in the Roman Catholic Church as a titular see.

Its site is located near Farı mevkii, Kılıç, in Asiatic Turkey.
