= Srifa =

Srifa صريفا
- Municipality
- Location within Lebanon
- Coordinates: 33°16′53″N 35°23′47″E
- Grid position: 187/298 PAL
- Country: Lebanon
- Governorate: South Governorate
- District: Tyre District

Area
  - Total: 2.679 km^{2} (1.034 sq mi)
- Elevation: 450 m (1,480 ft)

Population
  - Total: 4,750(as in 2,015)
  - Density: 1,770/km^{2} (4,590/sq mi)
- Time zone: UTC+2 (EET)
  - Summer (DST): UTC+3 (EEST)
- Postal code: 6883
- Dialing code: +961

Srifa (Arabic: صريفا, romanized: Ṣrīfā) is a municipality in Southern Lebanon, located in Tyre District, Governorate of South Lebanon. It is located 20.8 kilometres east of the city Tyros and 90 kilometers south of the capital Beirut. It is the birthplace of Rima Fakih, Miss USA 2010.

== Etymology ==
According to E. H. Palmer, the origin of the name is Sref. It has been suggested that the name means melting and purifying metals(the place of purification and smelting of metals)or it means "casting dirhams”.

== History ==
In 1875, during the late Ottoman era, Victor Guérin found here an ancient column, and a few cut stones, proving that the place was an ancient site. Guérin found that the village had 150 Metawileh villagers.

In 1881, the PEF's Survey of Western Palestine (SWP) described it: "A village, built of stone, containing about 200 Metawileh, it is situated on a hill, and surrounded by olives, figs, and arable land. Water from a spring; and cisterns in the village."

The village was heavily bombed during the 2006 Lebanon War. On July 12, the Israelis killed 4 civilians in the village, while on July 19, they killed 17 Hezbollah fighters and 5 civilians.

== Demographics ==
In 2014 Muslims made up 99.52% of registered voters in Srifa. 98.64% of the voters were Shiite Muslims.

== Bibliography ==
- Conder, C.R.; Kitchener, H.H. (1881). The Survey of Western Palestine: Memoirs of the Topography, Orography, Hydrography, and Archaeology. Vol. 1. London: Committee of the Palestine Exploration Fund.
- Guérin, V. (1880). Description Géographique Historique et Archéologique de la Palestine (in French). Vol. 3: Galilee, pt. 2. Paris: L'Imprimerie Nationale.
- HRW (2007). Why They Died: Civilian Casualties in Lebanon During the 2006 War. Human Rights Watch.
- Palmer, E.H. (1881). The Survey of Western Palestine: Arabic and English Name Lists Collected During the Survey by Lieutenants Conder and Kitchener, R. E. Transliterated and Explained by E.H. Palmer. Committee of the Palestine Exploration Fund.
