= Aaitit =

Aaitit عيتيت 'Aytit
- Municipality
- Location within Lebanon
- Coordinates: 33°13′28″N 35°18′19″E
- Grid position: 178/292 PAL
- Country: Lebanon
- Governorate: South Governorate
- District: Tyre District

Area
  - Land: 2.76 sq mi (7.1 km^{2})
- Elevation: 950 ft (290 m)

Population (2011)
  - Total: 12,000
- Time zone: GMT +3

Aaitit Arabic: عيتيت, romanized: ʿAytīt) is a municipality located in Tyre District, South Lebanon, north of Qana.

== History ==
In the early 1860s Ernest Renan noted: "Its antiquities are a stone with three circles, two with rays, in which are crosses (not of great age), a grotto, and beside it a good sarcophagus lid serving to support a press. Near Aitit is a rectangular cemetery, well preserved".

In 1881, the PEF's Survey of Western Palestine (SWP) described it as "A village, built of stone, containing about 450 Metawileh, situated on hill-top, surrounded by olives and arable cultivation; water supplied from cisterns and a spring near."

They further noted: "There are traces at this village of ancient remains. It is said by the natives that there was once a church here. There are broken pillars scattered about, stone lintels, three caves, and three olive-presses, with cisterns." Aitit is mainly occupied by the family of the Mohsens, who have the majority of the village.

=== Modern era ===
Due to it being close to Israel many attacks have been made against Hezbollah in Aaitit. Most of these incidents were due to the 2006 Lebanon War. On 8 March 2026, at least three people were killed in an Israeli strike on the village.

== Demographics ==
As of 2010, Aaitit had a year round population of about 2,500, though it rose to 3,000 in the summers. Some of the population had migrated to Paraguay and Brazil by this point.

In 2014 Muslims made up 98.50% of registered voters in Aaitit. 96.87% of the voters were Shiite Muslims.

== Bibliography ==
- Conder, C.R.; Kitchener, H.H. (1881). The Survey of Western Palestine: Memoirs of the Topography, Orography, Hydrography, and Archaeology. Vol. 1. London: Committee of the Palestine Exploration Fund.
- Palmer, E.H. (1881). The Survey of Western Palestine: Arabic and English Name Lists Collected During the Survey by Lieutenants Conder and Kitchener, R. E. Transliterated and Explained by E.H. Palmer. Committee of the Palestine Exploration Fund.
- Renan, E. (1864). Mission de Phénicie (in French). Paris: Imprimerie impériale.
