= Timeline of the Israel–Hezbollah conflict (27 July 2024 – 16 September 2024) =

This timeline of the Israel–Hezbollah conflict covers the period from 27 July 2024, when a Hezbollah rocket struck a soccer field in Majdal Shams in the Golan Heights, killing 12 children, to 16 September 2024, one day before the explosion of Hezbollah pagers and walkie talkies.

Major events during this period:

- 27 July: A Hezbollah rocket struck a soccer field in Majdal Shams in the Golan Heights, killing 12 children. Unusually, Hezbollah denied being responsible for the strike, saying it was an Israeli Iron Dome projectile which hit the field. It is currently unknown whether the attack was deliberate or a misfire, or what group precisely is responsible for the strike.
- 30 July: Fuad Shukr was assassinated by Israel, for which Hezbollah vowed revenge. At least three civilians were killed in the airstrike.
- 31 July: Ismail Haniyeh was assassinated by Israel in Iran. Leader of Hezbollah Hassan Nasrallah said that the conflict was entering a "new phase" following the assassinations of Shukr and Haniyeh.
- 17 August: Israel struck a warehouse in Nabatieh, which they claimed was being used as a Hezbollah weapons storage facility, killing 11, including one woman and her two children. The building housed an iron warehouse in an industrial district. The building also housed Syrian refugees on the top floor, three of which died.
- 25 August: Israel strikes Hezbollah militants, killing 8, and Hezbollah strikes back with rockets fired at Israel, killing one Israeli Navy sailor and injuring two others. Hezbollah framed their response as their the start of their revenge for the assassination of Shukr.

In this period, the US and the international community (including UN agencies such as UNIFIL and OHCHR) continued to urge all sides to de-escalate, with many noting there must be a ceasefire in Gaza before there is a ceasefire in Lebanon.

== July ==
=== 27 July ===
- An Israeli airstrike in Kafr Kila killed four Hezbollah militants.
- An Israeli Navy Sa'ar 6-class corvette intercepted a Hezbollah drone over Israeli territorial waters believed to be targeting the Karish gas field.
- Hezbollah claimed that it fired over 100 rockets at four Israeli targets, including the headquarters of the Hermon Brigade of the Israel Defense Forces (IDF), near Majdal Shams.
- A rocket attack on a soccer field in Majdal Shams killed at least 12 people and injured 34 others, including children. Hezbollah denied responsibility.
- The IDF intercepted a UAV from Lebanon over Israeli airspace, while a second UAV struck the Yiftah area, causing no casualties.
- The IDF attacked targets in Jibbain and Labbouneh. It later shelled a launch site in Shebaa where the rocket that reportedly struck Majdal Shams was fired from.

=== 28 July ===
- The IAF struck Hezbollah infrastructure in the Beqaa Valley, Shabriha, Burj el-Shemali, Kafr Kila, Rab El Thalathine, Khiam and Tayr Harfa. It later struck Shikhin.
- Hezbollah fired two rockets at Shtula, striking a home. It also fired rockets toward Manara and claimed to have struck two IDF bases.
- The foreign ministries of Belgium, France and Norway advised their citizens to leave Lebanon.

=== 29 July ===
- Israeli drone strikes on motorcycles between Shaqra and Meiss Ej Jabal killed two Hezbollah fighters, including a Radwan member, and injured three others.
- The Australian government advised its citizens in Lebanon to leave and issued warnings against travel to the country.

=== 30 July ===
- The IDF struck ten Hezbollah targets in seven areas in Lebanon, killing one militant.
- Hezbollah fired ten rockets into Israel, with shrapnel killing a civilian in HaGoshrim and wounding three others.
- Suspected Israeli airstrikes targeted two Syrian military bases in Tel Jaiba and Tel Umm Khoran, near Daraa.
- Hezbollah claimed that it attacked Israeli warplanes in Lebanese airspace, forcing them to retreat.
- Israel said it had carried out a strike in the Dahieh suburb of Beirut, targeting Hezbollah commander Fuad Shukr, who it accused of responsibility for the Majdal Shams attack. Shukr and three civilians were killed, while 74 others were injured.
- The UK urged its citizens to leave Lebanon.

=== 31 July ===
- Residents in northern Israeli communities were urged to stay away from the border with Lebanon, while gatherings were limited by the Mateh Asher Regional Council.
- Ismail Haniyeh, political leader of Hamas, was assassinated. According to ABC News (Australia), This made war between Israel and Hezbollah now "closer than ever" to bringing "devastation to three countries" (Israel, Iran and Lebanon).

== August ==
=== 1 August ===
- Hezbollah's secretary-general Hassan Nasrallah said that its conflict with Israel entered a new phase following the assassinations of Ismail Haniyeh and Shukr.
- An Israeli airstrike was reported in Kafr Kila. The Israeli Air Force (IAF) later struck a rocket launcher in Yater while the IDF shelled Rmeish and Ramyeh.
- An Israeli airstrike on Chamaa killed four Syrians and wounded several Lebanese civilians.
- Hezbollah fired dozens of rockets at Matzuva in its first attack since Shukr's assassination, causing no injuries.

=== 2 August ===
- The IAF struck Hezbollah targets in Blida. Several other villages in southern Lebanon were also attacked, with the IDF saying it targeted two militants and launch sites which were used by Hezbollah to fire rockets to northern Israel the previous day.
- An Israeli drone strike struck a Hezbollah operative who fired rockets to northern Israel.
- Hezbollah claimed it fired a surface-to-air missile at an Israeli warplane in Lebanese airspace, forcing it to retreat.
- Hezbollah claimed two artillery attacks and two rocket attacks on IDF positions in northern Israel.

=== 3 August ===
- The IAF struck Hezbollah infrastructure in Tayr Harfa, Kafr Kila and Rab El Thalathine.
- Israeli airstrikes targeted a convoy of trucks in Hawsh el-Sayyed Ali on the border with Syria, injuring one driver.
- The US Embassy in Lebanon and the Jordanian foreign ministry urged their citizens to leave the country.
- An Israeli airstrike in Bazourieh killed an important member of Hezbollah's Southern Front. Another airstrike in Deir Siriane killed one Hezbollah fighter.
- Hezbollah fired around 50 Katyusha rockets at the Upper Galilee, targeting Avivim and Sha'ar Yeshuv.

=== 4 August ===
- Hezbollah fired 30 rockets at Kiryat Shmona and Beit Hillel. Most of them were intercepted and no casualties occurred.
- The IDF attacked Hezbollah targets in Marjayoun and Odaisseh. Israeli airstrikes struck Hezbollah infrastructure in Zibqin and Hula.
- An Israeli drone missed its target of a motorcycle in Rab El Thalathine. No injuries were reported.

=== 5 August ===
- The IAF struck a facility used by Hezbollah for storing weapons and other infrastructure sites in Kafr Kila, while the IDF shelled Chebaa and Rachaya Al Foukhar.
- An Israeli airstrike killed two Hezbollah fighters in Hula. Another strike in Meiss Ej Jabal killed a militant and a paramedic for the Islamic Message Scouts Association.
- A Hezbollah drone attack near Ayelet HaShahar sparked a fire and injured two Israeli soldiers.
- The IDF intercepted an aerial target from Lebanon in Israeli airspace and identified a second near Nahariya.
- A Redwan Force commander was killed in an Israeli drone strike in Ebba.

=== 6 August ===
- An Israeli airstrike in Mayfadoun killed five Hezbollah fighters. A sixth fighter was killed in another airstrike in Odaisseh.
- Nineteen people were injured in a Hezbollah drone attack on Nahariya, including six soldiers at the Shraga Camp. At least one person was critically injured after an Israeli interceptor missile crashed south of the city.
- Hezbollah claimed drone attacks on two IDF sites near Acre and a military vehicle.
- The IAF struck two Hezbollah facilities in southern Lebanon. Later, Israeli warplanes flew low over Beirut, causing sonic booms.
- Hezbollah fired 30 rockets targeting the Golan Heights and the Galilee.

=== 7 August ===
- The IAF attacked Hezbollah infrastructure in Aitaroun, Halta and Kafr Kila while the IDF attacked and shelled launchers and infrastructure throughout southern Lebanon.
- An Israeli drone strike on a motorcycle in Jwaya killed the commander of Hezbollah's anti-tank rocket unit. The strike also hit a nearby car, killing one civilian and injuring four others.
- Hezbollah fired ten rockets at Safed, causing no casualties. Two people were injured by an Israeli interceptor missile in the Western Galilee.

=== 8 August ===
- The IAF and drones struck Hezbollah targets in Kafr Kila, Yarine, Rachaf, At Tiri and Hula. Hezbollah announced the death of one fighter.
- Hezbollah fired 15 missiles into northern Israel.
- An alleged Israeli airstrike targeting the Shayrat Airbase in Homs, Syria wounded four soldiers.

=== 9 August ===
- The IDF struck several Hezbollah targets in southern Lebanon overnight, including in Hanaouay and Ayta ash Shab.
- Several rockets from Lebanon struck open areas in Kiryat Shmona, causing no injuries.
- An Israeli drone strike in Naqoura killed two Hezbollah members.
- An Israeli drone strike on a vehicle in Sidon killed a Hamas security official from Ain al-Hilweh and wounded two civilians.
- An Israeli civilian died from wounds sustained from shrapnel after an Iron Dome interceptor missile crashed on Highway 4 near Nahariya on 6 August.

=== 10 August ===
- Hezbollah fired ten rockets into the Western Galilee targeting Eilon. No injuries were reported.
- Hezbollah fired several drones into northern Israel, reaching as far as Maghar, 20 kilometres (12 mi) from the border and causing no injuries.

=== 11 August ===
- An Israeli airstrike on a motorcycle in Taybeh killed two Redwan fighters.
- The IDF increased the amount of surveillance drones in northern Israel to identify Hezbollah launches.
- A Hezbollah anti-tank missile caused damage in Netu'a.
- An Israeli airstrike on Derdghaiya, southern Lebanon killed three Syrians.
- A Hezbollah fighter died from wounds sustained from an Israeli airstrike in Beit Lif.
- Hezbollah announced the death of three of its fighters.
- Hezbollah fired around 30 rockets at Kabri, causing no injuries.

=== 12 August ===
- Hezbollah fired rockets at Ramam Ridge, Metula, and Shebaa Farms, causing no casualties.
- The IAF struck a Hezbollah rocket launcher in Wardiyeh and infrastructure in Chihine and Jibbain, while the IDF struck Wadi Hamoul, Ramyeh and Ayta ash Shab.
- Hezbollah reportedly evacuated its headquarters in Dahieh, Beirut.

=== 13 August ===
- The IAF struck Hezbollah targets in Chihine, Aalma ech Chaab and Ayta ash Shab. The IDF conducted drone strikes against Hezbollah rocket launchers in at-Tiri and Zibqin while tanks struck fighters in Shebaa Farms.
- An Israeli drone strike in Baraachit killed two Hezbollah fighters of the group's Southern Front.
- Israeli air defenses intercepted two drones from Lebanon targeting northern Israel.
- Hezbollah fired 15 rockets at Malkia. An hour later, it fired 25 rockets at Mount Meron. Both barrages caused no injuries.
- An Israeli strike on Maaroub injured a Lebanese national and 11 Syrians.

=== 14 August ===
- An Israeli drone strike on a car in the town square of Marjayoun killed one person and injured nine others. The IDF said that it killed two Hezbollah members in the town.
- One person was killed and another was wounded in an Israeli strike in Blida, where the IDF said it targeted Hezbollah infrastructure.
- Hezbollah announced the death of two of its members.
- An Israeli airstrike in Aabbassiyeh injured 17 people.
- Hezbollah fired several rockets at Kiryat Shmona in response to the strike in Aabbassiyeh, causing no injuries. It also claimed other attacks on IDF targets in northern Israel.

=== 15 August ===
- Hezbollah fired 20 rockets into northern Israel, injuring a civilian in Shamir.

=== 16 August ===
- The IDF intercepted two drones from Lebanon over the upper Galilee and the Golan Heights. Another drone struck Kela Alon, causing a fire.
- A rocket crashed into an open area in Netu'a, causing no casualties.
- The IAF struck Hezbollah infrastructure in Maroun al-Ras and Ayta ash Shab.
- A Hezbollah surveillance drone crashed in Beitegen.

=== 17 August ===
- An Israeli airstrike on a residential building in Nabatieh killed ten people, including a mother and her two children, and injured five others. The IDF claimed that it was a Hezbollah storage facility.
- Hezbollah fired 55 rockets at Ayelet HaShahar in response to the attack on Nabatieh, causing no casualties.
- Two Hezbollah drones struck an IDF position in Misgav Am, injuring two soldiers.
- An Israeli drone strike on a motorcycle in Tzur killed Redwan commander Hussein Ibrahim.

=== 18 August ===
- An explosion near a UN-marked vehicle in Yarine lightly injured three UNIFIL peacekeepers.
- An Israeli airstrike on a motorcycle in southern Lebanon killed one person and injured another.
- The IAF struck Hezbollah targets in Chebaa, Ayta ash Shab, Matoura and at-Tiri.
- Hezbollah fired 20 rockets at Kiryat Shmona, causing no injuries.

=== 19 August ===
- Hezbollah fired five drones at northern Israel, three of which were intercepted. One remaining drone hit near Gesher HaZiv and the other struck Ya'ara, killing an Israeli-Bedouin soldier of the 300th "Baram" Regional Brigade and injuring four, one critically.
- Hezbollah fired 33 rockets into northern Israel. Twenty-three targeted the Upper Galilee, while ten targeted Shlomi and Zar'it.
- An Israel airstrike on Hula killed two Hezbollah members.
- Hezbollah claimed air and drone attacks on an IDF base near the border and another near Acre.
- An Israeli airstrike hit a Hezbollah arms depot in the Beqaa Valley, injuring eight people.
- An Israeli airstrike in Deir Qanoun En Nahr killed a senior member of Hezbollah's rocket and missile unit.

=== 20 August ===
- Hezbollah fired 115 rockets into northern Israel and the Golan Heights, causing fires. No injuries were reported.
- Israeli strikes in Mashaa al-Mansouri injured two Palestinian refugees, while a Syrian national was injured from Israeli shelling of Lebanese border villages.
- An Israeli airstrike targeting a Hezbollah weapons storage building near Baalbek killed two people and injured 19 others.

=== 21 August ===
- Khalil Maqdah, a senior Fatah official and the brother of the head of the Lebanese branch of the Al-Aqsa Martyrs' Brigades, was killed by an Israeli airstrike in Sidon.
- Hezbollah fired at least 50 rockets into northern Israel and the Golan Heights, striking houses and injuring one civilian in Katzrin.
- A Hezbollah member was killed in an Israeli attack in Beit Lif.
- Hezbollah claimed a drone strike on IDF bases and warehouses near Amiad.

=== 22 August ===
- The IAF struck Hezbollah targets across ten areas in southern Lebanon.
- Kenya evacuated 11 of its citizens from Lebanon.

=== 23 August ===
- Two Hezbollah anti-tank missiles directly struck the Al-Malikiyah IAF base in Mount Meron, causing damage.
- The IAF struck a Hezbollah cell in Tayr Harfa, killing three militants. It later struck a car in Ayta al-Jabal, killing a senior member of Hezbollah's rocket and missiles unit and his ten-year-old nephew. Airstrikes in Meiss Ej Jabal and Aitaroun killed two and injured three others. In total, ten people were killed in Lebanon, eight of them Hezbollah members.
- Hezbollah fired 100 rockets into northern Israel, including 40 targeting Kiryat Shmona and 20 targeting Safed. No injuries were reported.
- Israeli airstrikes against four targets in Homs and Hama, Syria, including a Hezbollah fuel storage facility, killed three Iran-backed militants and injured ten others.

=== 24 August ===
- Hezbollah targeted the communities of Kiryat Ata, Tamra and I'billin, and IDF targets in Misgav Am and Shtula.
- Hezbollah announced the death of one of its members.
- Israeli air defenses intercepted a suspected drone in Israeli airspace.
- Hezbollah fired eight rockets into the Golan Heights, causing no injuries.

=== 25 August ===
- The IAF launched preemptive strikes against Hezbollah as it planned a large-scale attack in response to Fouad Shukr's assassination. Using over 100 fighter jets, the IAF struck 40 Hezbollah launch sites in Lebanon.
- One Amal Movement member and two Hezbollah members were killed in Israeli attacks in Lebanon. One person died in an Israeli drone strike in Khiam, and two others were killed in At Tiri. Four people were injured in other attacks.
- Hezbollah said that it launched 320 rockets and several drones into Israel in its initial response to Shukr's assassination, targeting 11 IDF sites. Shrapnel from an Iron Dome interceptor missile struck an Israeli Dvora-class fast patrol boat off the coast of northern Israel, killing a sailor and injuring two others. One civilian was lightly wounded from shrapnel in Acre.

=== 26 August ===
- The IAF struck Hezbollah infrastructure in Tayr Harfa and Kafr Kila.
- A Hamas commander was seriously injured after an Israeli drone strike on his car in Sidon.

=== 27 August ===
- Hezbollah fired several drones into northern Israel, lightly injuring an Israeli soldier in Beit Hillel.
- The IDF struck a Hezbollah cell within a building in Odaisseh, and shelled Shebaa and Yarine.
- An Israeli airstrike struck a truck carrying Hezbollah missiles near Baalbek, injuring one person.

=== 28 August ===
- An Israeli drone strike on a car at a Syrian border checkpoint on the Beirut–Damascus Highway killed three Palestinian Islamic Jihad (PIJ) fighters and one Hezbollah fighter.
- A drone fired by Hezbollah fell in Dan and was recovered by the IDF. No injuries were reported.

=== 29 August ===
- An Israeli drone crashed near the Goma junction on Route 977 in the Upper Galilee, causing no casualties.
- Three mortars fired by Hezbollah struck a stream in Metula.
- A Syrian national injured in the 17 August Nabatieh attack died from his wounds.

=== 30 August ===
- The IAF struck rocket launchers in southern Lebanon, causing rockets to launch toward Israel. One rocket struck an open area in Migdal Tefen.
- The IAF struck a building housing Hezbollah militants in Tayr Harfa.
- Hezbollah fired a barrage of 40 rockets into the western Galilee, causing no casualties.

=== 31 August ===
- The IAF struck a building housing Hezbollah members in Markaba while artillery struck several targets in southern Lebanon.
- A Hezbollah suicide drone crashed near Beit Hillel, causing no casualties.

== September ==
=== 1 September ===
- An anti-tank missile from Lebanon wounded three people near Yuval.
- Hezbollah fired 20 rockets at Mattat and another ten at Misgav Am, causing no casualties.
- The IAF struck rocket launchers in Ayta ash-Shab and Bint Jbeil as well as Hezbollah infrastructure in Beit Lif, Taybeh and Odaisseh.
- Hezbollah announced that one of its members was killed in an Israeli attack.
- Israeli strikes in southern Lebanon injured 11 people.

=== 2 September ===
- The IAF struck Hezbollah buildings in Yaroun, Ayta ash Shab, Hanine, Tayr Harfa and Blida overnight. It also struck infrastructure near Markaba and an observation post in Hula.
- An Israeli drone strike on a car in Naqoura killed two people, one of them a worker for a cleaning firm under contract with UNIFIL.
- A rocket attack caused heavy damage to a home in Avivim.
- Hezbollah fired five rockets at northern Israel, with one striking the area near Ein Ya'akov. No injuries were reported.
- The IAF struck ten rocket launchers in Zibqin and Chihine, causing rockets to launch toward Arab al-Aramshe.
- Hezbollah fired 30 rockets into Israel, causing no casualties.

=== 3 September ===
- Several rockets were fired from Lebanon into northern Israel, with one striking Arab al-Aramshe, causing no casualties.
- The IAF struck a building housing a Hezbollah fighter in Markaba and other infrastructure in Al Rihan.

=== 4 September ===
- The IDF intercepted a Hezbollah drone over the western Galilee while another drone struck an open area near Manara, causing fires.
- The IDF carried out a drone attack in southern Lebanon.
- Hezbollah fired 65 rockets into northern Israel, striking at least one home in Kiryat Shmona and causing a number of fires. It later fired five rockets at Zar'it and one at Shtula. In the evening, it fired 30 more rockets into the Galilee panhandle, causing fires around Kfar Blum. No casualties occurred in the attacks.
- The IDF struck a Hezbollah launcher in Zibqin and buildings in Khiam and Ayta ash-Shab. Later, the IAF struck rocket launchers in Kunin and Qabrikha and a building housing fighters in Hula. A woman was killed and five others, including a child were injured in the attacks. In the evening, the IAF hit ten rocket launchers in Jibbain, Zawtar El Charkiyeh, and Ramyah.

=== 5 September ===
- Five rockets were fired at Ramot Naftali, with one hitting the area.
- Israeli fighter jets intercepted two drones over Israeli airspace. Another drone struck Ya'ara.
- The IDF struck Hezbollah infrastructure in Qana.
- An Israeli air raid on Kafra killed a Hezbollah member and injured another.

=== 6 September ===
- A Hezbollah drone struck an open area in Ma'ayan Baruch, causing no casualties. Several other drones struck Abirim, causing a fire.
- Hezbollah fired several missiles into the Upper Galilee, causing no casualties. At least three anti-tank missiles hit Metula, damaging infrastructure. Another rocket struck Manara.
- The IAF hit a building housing Hezbollah fighters in Matmoura. It later struck buildings in Aitaroun and infrastructure in Bayt Lif. Israeli airstrikes hit over 15 rocket launchers in Nabatieh Governorate in the evening, causing rockets to fire and crash in Lebanese territory.

=== 7 September ===
- Hezbollah fired 30 rockets at Mattat in the morning, claiming it targeted the Mount Niriya IDF base. In the afternoon, it fired ten rockets into Israel, damaging a house in Shlomi and starting a fire in Liman. It also fired five rockets at Safed and Birya, hitting open areas.
- The IAF struck a Hezbollah rocket launcher in Yater. It later struck infrastructure and a launcher in Qabrikha while artillery hit Ayta ash Shab and Kfarchouba.
- Two Islamic Health Committee paramedics were wounded in an Israeli attack in Qabrikha.
- An Israeli airstrike on a firetruck in Froun killed three paramedics, including two affiliated with the Amal Movement, and injured two others. Hezbollah targeted an IDF headquarters with missiles in response.
- Two Hezbollah drones targeting Israel crashed in Ain Ebel.

=== 8 September ===
- Hezbollah fired a total of 50 Katyusha rockets at Kiryat Shmona and Shamir in three barrages in the early morning. A building and sidewalk in Kiryat Shmona were damaged, while at least 30 rockets were fired at Shamir. No casualties were reported.
- The IAF intercepted a UAV from Lebanon near Malkia, causing no damage or casualties.
- The IAF struck Hezbollah infrastructure in Al Rihan. It also struck a building in Khirbet Selm.
- Israeli airstrikes against military sites in central Syria, including at a weapons research laboratory used by pro-Iranian militias in Masyaf, and in Tartus and Hama Governorates, killed 27 people and injured 32 others. It was also reported that the IAF's Shaldag Unit carried out a ground raid against the facility in Masyaf, planting explosives inside and seizing documents.

=== 9 September ===
- Hezbollah fired two drones at Nahariya, striking a residential building and causing no casualties.
- Hezbollah fired a barrage of 20 rockets targeting IDF bases in the western Galilee, hitting open areas.
- The Islamic Group's military wing claimed rocket attacks on an IDF post in Beit Hillel in their first attacks against Israel in several months.
- Hezbollah claimed that it fired a surface-to-air missile at an Israeli jet in Lebanese airspace, forcing it to retreat.
- The IAF struck Hezbollah targets in Kafr Kila, Taybeh, Hanine, and Yarine. Later, it struck several targets in Kafr Kila while a drone strike targeted a militant in Talloussa and tanks attacked an observation post in Kfarchouba. In the evening, the IAF attacked targets in Ayta ash Shab, Khiam and Naqoura while mortars were fired at Naqoura.
- Hezbollah attacked an IDF base near Shlomi with three drones, slightly wounding two soldiers.

=== 10 September ===
- An Israeli drone strike on a vehicle near Lake Qaraoun in the Beqaa Valley killed a Redwan commander and injured two others.
- Hezbollah fired 30 Katyusha rockets at Sasa and Mount Meron and another 15 at the western Galilee, causing no injuries. It also fired several drones.
- The IAF struck Hezbollah launch sites in Mansouri and At Tiri. It also targeted a military building in Rachaf, wounding 12 people. It later struck a weapons plant in Jwaya and a command room and other structures in Nabatieh, Mansouri and Kafr Kila.
- An Israeli airstrike targeted a Hezbollah fighter in Hula.
- Hezbollah fired several drones targeting an IDF site in northern Israel, with some striking near Ami'ad.

=== 11 September ===
- The IAF struck 30 Hezbollah targets, including rocket launchers and infrastructure, in Jibbain, Naqoura, Deir Siriane, and Zibqin, while artillery fired at al-Dahira. It later struck two Hezbollah fighters in Meiss Ej Jabal and rocket launchers in El Maryamine and Rachaya Al Foukhar while artillery hit Naqoura and Ayta ash Shab.
- Hezbollah and the al-Qassam Brigades fired 60 rockets into the western Galilee, targeting Avivim and Kfar Szold. An anti-tank missile struck a building in Dan, seriously injuring an Israeli reservist. Anti-tank missiles were also fired at Shebaa Farms and Metula. In the evening, Hezbollah fired 30 rockets at Arab al-Aramshe and ten at Matat.
- An Israeli drone strike in Tyre killed a Hezbollah fighter.

=== 12 September ===
- The IAF struck a Hezbollah military building in Maroun al-Ras and a rocket launcher in Majdel Selm.
- Hezbollah fired 15 rockets into the western Galilee, causing fires near Matzuva and Mitzpe Hila.
- Israeli airstrikes in the Quneitra Governorate of Syria killed two Hezbollah fighters.
- An Israeli airstrike on two motorcycles in Kafr Jouz killed a Hezbollah fighter and two civilians, including a child, and injured three others.

=== 13 September ===
- Hezbollah launched 20 rockets and several drones targeting the IDF's Filon Base in Safed, causing wildfires.
- Hezbollah launched two drones into northern Israel, striking a building outside Rosh Pinna and an open area in the Sea of Galilee region.
- The IAF struck a building housing Hezbollah fighters in Kaukaba and other targets, including a weapons depot and rocket launcher, in Majdel Selm.
- Hezbollah announced that it conducted nine attacks against Israeli targets throughout the day.
- Two Redwan fighters were killed in an Israeli airstrike on an apartment in the Bekaa Valley. Hezbollah announced the death of one fighter.
- An Israeli drone strike in al-Ahmadiya killed one person and injured four others.

=== 14 September ===
- Hezbollah fired five rockets at Safed. It later fired two barrages totaling 55 rockets at the city, causing fires and no casualties. Hezbollah claimed it targeted an IDF artillery base and IDF bases in Amiad and Elifelet.
- Israeli strikes hit two rocket launchers in southern Lebanon and a building in Kfar Remen. The IAF also struck two buildings in Blida. It later carried out strikes against Hezbollah weapons depots and storage facilities in the Bekaa Valley, Baalbek, and seven areas in southern Lebanon. A strike on Al-Kawakh in Baalbek-Hermel Governorate injured four people, including three children.
- Israeli air defenses intercepted a drone over Gornot HaGalil.

=== 15 September ===
- Hezbollah fired 40 rockets at the Golan Heights, starting fires in open areas and no injuries.
- A Hezbollah drone targeting Israeli soldiers struck an uninhabited area in Metula.
- An Israeli drone dropped flyers urging citizens to evacuate over the Wazzani area. The commander of the 769th "Hiram" Regional Brigade distributed the flyers without approval from senior officers.
- The IAF struck 20 Hezbollah rocket launchers and infrastructure in Jarmaq.
- Two Hezbollah drones struck the Golan Heights, slightly injuring several Israeli soldiers.

=== 16 September ===
- Hezbollah fired 10 rockets into the Upper Galilee, causing no injuries. Rocket attacks caused fires to break out near HaGoshrim and Snir. Later, three rockets struck open areas near Matat. A building in Metula was damaged by a rocket attack in the evening, while ten rockets were fired at Ramot Naftali.
- The IAF struck Hezbollah buildings in Hula. It later struck weapons depots and buildings in Tayr Harfa, Odaisseh, Blida and Kfarchouba. In the night, it struck another weapons depot, an observation post, and other buildings in Rab al-Thalathine, Hula, Maroun al-Ras and Blida.
- An Israeli airstrike in Hula killed a Hezbollah fighter and injured four others. A separate mortar attack near a car in Tayr Harfa slightly injured two Hezbollah-linked paramedics.
