= Timeline of the Israel–Hezbollah conflict (1 April – 26 July 2024) =

This timeline of the Israel–Hezbollah conflict covers the period from 1 April 2024, when Israel struck the Iranian consulate in Damascus, to 26 July 2024, one day before the Majdal Shams attack.

After the consulate airstrike, which killed 16 people including 2 Iranian generals, Iran retaliated with drone and missile strikes on Israel, their first direct attack on Israel since the start of their proxy conflict. Nobody was killed in Iran's retaliatory strikes, however many people were treated for minor injuries with 1 child critically injured. Iran's response was seen as "limited", pleasing hardliners calling for a response whilst limiting escalation, not wanting to provoke a full scale war with Israel and the US. Iran repeatedly signalled to the US that their response would be "contained", via diplomatic back-channels, and that it had no desire for a war with the US, which the US reciprocated.

== April ==
=== 1 April ===
- An Israeli airstrike near the Iranian embassy in Damascus killed sixteen people, including Mohammad Reza Zahedi, a senior officer in the IRGC and a Hezbollah member.
- The IDF simultaneously attacked ten Hezbollah targets in the Rachaya al Foukhar area.

=== 2 April ===
- The IDF struck Khiam, killing a Hezbollah member. It also struck Naqoura, Jabal Al-Labouneh, Alma Al-Shaab, Tayr Harfa, Al-Dhahira and Aita Al-Shaab with heavy artillery.
- Hezbollah announced that they targeted an IDF position in al-Malikiyah.

=== 3 April ===
- The IDF said it strengthened its air defenses and deployed reservists as Israel prepared for a potential Iranian response to the airstrike on 1 April.

=== 4 April ===
- The IDF struck Hezbollah sites in Khiam and Kafr Kila. Later it carried out airstrikes in Yaroun, Aynata, and Maroun al-Ras.
- Hezbollah fired several projectiles at Western Galilee, damaging a house in Shlomi. The IDF responded by shelling the launch sites with artillery.

=== 5 April ===
- Israeli airstrikes struck a building in Marjayoun, killing three Amal Movement fighters. Seven others were injured in a raid on Kfar Hamam. Israeli airstrikes also targeted a house in Aita al-Shaab, killing two Hezbollah members and injuring two civilians.
- Hezbollah announced that it had struck Israeli sites in Misgav Am, Zarit Barracks, al-Malikiyah, Bayad Blida, Khallet Warda, Branit, and Jal al-Alam.

=== 6 April ===
- Hezbollah announced the death of two of its members in an attack on Mais al-Jabal.

=== 7 April ===
- Hezbollah downed an Israeli Hermes 900 drone over Lebanese airspace.
- The IDF struck four Hezbollah sites in Baalbek, including a military complex.
- Hezbollah fired dozens of Katyusha rockets into the Golan Heights, striking an air defense base.

=== 8 April ===
- An Israeli strike in as-Sultaniyah killed three Hezbollah members, including senior Radwan commander Ali Ahmed Hussein.
- A Hezbollah drone crashed in Rosh HaNikra while two other drones were intercepted near Kiryat Shmona.
- The IDF said it struck Hezbollah military infrastructure in Khiam.

=== 9 April ===
- The IDF said overnight airstrikes in Syria struck military infrastructure and a Syrian Army post in Mahajjah.

=== 10 April ===
- The IDF struck Hezbollah targets in Ayta ash-Shab, Khiam, and shelled sites near Naquoura.

=== 11 April ===
- The IDF struck a building in Dhayra and used tanks to shell a site near Tayr Harfa. It later struck Hezbollah targets in Mays al-Jabal, Yarine, Khiam, and Marwahin, where it also struck a Hezbollah observation post, and attacked areas near Abou Chach with artillery.

=== 12 April ===
- Hezbollah fired at least 40 Katyusha rockets into the Galilee panhandle targeting IDF artillery positions.
- The IDF struck Hezbollah sites in Ayta ash Shab and Taybeh.
- France, Poland, and Russia issued advisories against travel to Israel, Palestine, and Lebanon.

=== 13 April ===
- An IDF reservist and member of the Hanita security team was seriously wounded by a Hezbollah drone attack.
- The IDF said it struck a large Hezbollah complex and a military post in Al Rihan. It later announced that it simultaneously attacked Hezbollah targets in Houla, Bayt Lif, Odaisseh, and Taybeh. In the night it struck military structures in Khiam and Kfar Kila.
- Hezbollah fired dozens of rockets at an IDF base in the Golan Heights, setting off sirens in Snir.

=== 14 April ===
- Hezbollah said it fired dozens of Katyusha rockets at three IDF positions in the Golan Heights.
- The IDF struck a site belonging to Radwan forces in the Jbaa area. It also struck a Hezbollah-owned building near Baalbek.
- Hezbollah announced the death of one of its fighters.

=== 15 April ===
- Hezbollah claimed responsibility for a bomb attack that injured four IDF troops operating inside Lebanese territory in the Tel Ismail area.

=== 16 April ===
- Hezbollah claimed responsibility for a missile and drone attack on an Iron Dome facility in Beit Hillel.
- Three people were killed in an Israeli strike on a car near Ain Ebel, including the commander of Hezbollah's coastal sector.
- Two Hezbollah members were killed after the IDF struck a car in Chehabiyeh.

=== 17 April ===
- Fourteen soldiers and four civilians were wounded after a Hezbollah drone struck a community center in Arab al-Aramshe. One soldier was critically injured and four others were seriously injured.
- Hezbollah claimed it fired a Burkan missile at the headquarters of the IDF's 91st division in Biranit.

=== 18 April ===
- An airstrike on Kafr Kila killed two Hezbollah members.
- Hezbollah attacked an IDF position in Al-Malikiyah.

=== 19 April ===
- The IDF struck Hezbollah military infrastructure in Ayta ash Shab, killing a Hezbollah member who was reportedly a son of influential Shiite cleric, the late Abdel Mohsin Fadlallah.

=== 20 April ===
- An IDF strike on a house in Jebbain killed three Hezbollah members and wounded two others. The IDF also said that it struck Hezbollah infrastructure in Kafr Kila and Ayta al Shaab.
- Hezbollah announced that it hit IDF positions in Metula and Shlomi.

=== 21 April ===
- The IDF said that it struck Hezbollah targets in Ayta ash-Shab, Naqoura and Majdal Zun.
- Hamas claimed responsibility for firing 20 Grad rockets from Lebanon into an IDF position near Shomera. No injuries were reported.
- An IDF soldier died from injuries sustained after the 17 April drone attack on Arab al-Aramshe.
- An IDF airstrike in Kafr Kila killed an Amal Movement member and injured two other people.

=== 22 April ===
- Hezbollah said that it shot down an Israeli Hermes 450 drone over the Al Aishiyeh area.
- Hezbollah launched approximately 35 missiles in the Ein Zeitim area, causing no casualties.
- The IDF struck Hezbollah targets in Arzoun and Al-Adiseh.

=== 23 April ===
- An overnight IDF strike killed a Redwan Force fighter. In the afternoon, an IDF drone strike on a car in the town of Aadloun killed a senior leader in Hezbollah's air defense unit.
- Hezbollah launched a drone attack into Acre targeting two IDF bases in its deepest attack into Israel since the war began.
- Two people were killed and six others were injured after an Israeli airstrike on a house in Hanine.

=== 24 April ===
- Hezbollah fired dozens of Katyusha rockets into northern Israel. Two houses in Avivim were significantly damaged.
- The IDF struck around 40 Hezbollah targets in Ayta ash-Shab with fighter jets and artillery.

=== 25 April ===
- One person was wounded after an Israeli drone strike on a truck in Duris.
- Hezbollah fired anti-tank guided missiles, rockets, and mortars at an IDF convoy in Ruwaisat al Alam, Shebaa Farms, destroying two vehicles and killing a civilian who had been carrying out infrastructure work for the IDF.
- The IDF carried out a total of seven airstrikes in Shebaa, Kfarchouba, Rachaya Al Foukhar, Hebbariye, Halta, and surrounding areas.

=== 26 April ===
- Two people were killed in an Israeli drone strike in eastern Lebanon.
- An Israeli drone strike on a car in Meidoun killed two Islamic Group members, including senior commander Mosab Khalaf.
- Hezbollah fired 30 Katyusha rockets in the Mount Hermon area, targeting IDF bases. Some of the rockets were intercepted by the Iron Dome, while others landed in open areas.

=== 27 April ===
- Hezbollah announced the death of two of its members in Kafr Kila and Khiam. A civilian was also killed in Kfarchouba.
- Hezbollah said it launched drones and guided missiles into northern Israel targeting the headquarters of the Manara military command and a gathering of members of the Golani Brigade's 51st Battalion.
- Israeli fighter jets struck a Hezbollah compound in the Qaouzah area. It later struck Hezbollah targets in Markaba and Srebbine, wounding at least eleven Lebanese and Syrian nationals. Two people were in serious condition.
- Hezbollah fired around 26 rockets targeting Mount Meron and Bar Yochai, with all the rockets being intercepted or falling into open areas. An Israeli soldier was lightly wounded by debris. A 12-year-old girl was also treated for anxiety.

=== 28 April ===
- The IDF carried out attacks on Hezbollah targets in Maroun al Ras, Tayr Harfa, and Yarine.
- French Foreign Minister Stéphane Séjourné arrived in Lebanon to discuss proposals to de-escalate tensions between Israel and Hezbollah.

=== 29 April ===
- The Al-Qassam Brigades fired around 20 rockets into the Upper Galilee from southern Lebanon, targeting an IDF position in Kiryat Shmona.

=== 30 April ===
- Two anti-tank missiles targeting the Dovev area struck open areas.
- Two people were lightly injured after their truck was targeted by an anti-tank missile in the Ramot Naftali area.
- The IDF attacked Hezbollah positions in Khiam, Kafr Kila, Bleida, Odaisseh, and Meiss Ej Jabal.

== May ==
=== 1 May ===
- Hezbollah targeted an IDF base in Biranit with rockets and artillery.

=== 2 May ===
- Israeli fighter jets bombed several buildings that housed Hezbollah militants in Ayta ash-Shab.

=== 3 May ===
- A woman suffered minor injuries from shrapnel after a rocket was intercepted over Juris, Israel.
- Eight people were wounded after an Israeli bombing on a Hezbollah General Intelligence training center in Damascus.

=== 4 May ===
- Hezbollah fired an anti-tank missile towards Shtula and two others towards Mount Hermon. Hezbollah claimed it was targeting a radar site near Shtula.
- The IDF attacked Hezbollah targets in Tayr Harfa, Naqoura, Marwahin, Harine, and Matmoura.

=== 5 May ===
- Israeli air raids in Meiss Ej Jabal caused "massive destruction," according to a Lebanese state-run agency, killing four civilians and wounding two others.
- Hezbollah fired 20 Katyusha and Falaq rockets towards Kiryat Shmona, striking several buildings and lightly injuring two. It later fired 40 rockets at the Galilee Panhandle and northern Golan Heights.

=== 6 May ===
- A Hezbollah explosive drone struck the Metula area, killing two Israeli soldiers and lightly wounding another. Hezbollah also launched 30 rockets at the Golan Heights, damaging houses in Kidmat Tzvi.
- The IDF announced overnight attacks on Hezbollah targets in Ramyah, Ayta ash Shab, Marwahin, Jabal Blat, and Shebaa Farms.
- The IDF struck 15 Radwan targets in al-Lwaiza, southern Lebanon. It also said it struck a Hezbollah compound in Sefri, close to Baalbek. Lebanese media said that the strike destroyed a factory and injured three people.
- Two rockets were fired from Nawa, Syria targeting Ramat Magshimim. The IDF responded with tank fire against the launch site.

=== 7 May ===
- Hezbollah announced that it launched Katyusha rockets towards the towns of Kiryat Shmona, Avivim, Shtula, Kfar Yuval, Kfar Giladi and Zaoura.

=== 8 May ===
- Israel carried out heavy airstrikes in 28 towns and villages in southern Lebanon, including a strike in Khiam where three members of the Al Quds Brigades were killed.
- Hezbollah claimed ten attacks in Israel, including against a military headquarters in Ya'ara and a barracks in Biranit.
- Hezbollah announced the death of two of its fighters in Odaisseh.

=== 9 May ===
- The IDF struck a car in Baflieh reportedly killing four people. Hezbollah eventually announced all as their own members.
- An Israeli soldier was killed and another was lightly injured by mortar fire in the Malkiya area.
- Hezbollah launched four anti-tank missiles at Israeli targets, including an important highway.

=== 10 May ===
- Israeli strikes in Tayr Harfa killed a rescue worker belonging to the Risala Scout association and a telecommunications technician.
- Hezbollah launched 35 rockets into Kiryat Shmona, causing property damage and fires in northern Israel.
- An Israeli air raid in Yaroun killed a Hezbollah member.

=== 11 May ===
- Two Hezbollah explosive drones struck Beit Hillel. Hezbollah claimed it was targeting an IDF base and an Iron Dome battery.
- IDF fighter jets struck a Hezbollah building in al-Amra.

=== 12 May ===
- Hezbollah said that it fired new heavy missiles called "Jihad Mughniyah" near Shebaa Farms.

=== 13 May ===
- Hezbollah conducted a twin drone attack that caused a small fire near Beit Hillel, claiming to have been targeting an IDF position.
- Four Israeli soldiers were wounded in a Hezbollah anti-tank missile attack near Kibbutz Yiftah.

=== 14 May ===
- An Israeli airstrike in Meiss Ej Jabal killed a Hezbollah member. The IDF also conducted strikes in Kharayeb, Halta, and Yaroun.
- Four anti-tank guided missiles were fired at the Upper Galilee from Lebanon, sounding sirens in Adamit, Hanita, Ya'ara, Eilon, Goren and Arab al-Aramshe.
- Hezbollah shot down an Israeli observation balloon over Adamit using missiles. Further anti-tank missile attacks targeting the community killed a civilian and wounded five soldiers.
- Hezbollah fired ten rockets at Mount Hermon, triggering sirens in Majdal Shams. No damage or injuries were reported.
- An Israeli drone strike on a car in Tyre killed two people and wounded two others. Hezbollah announced the death of senior commander Hussein Ibrahim Makki following the strike, who the IDF said belonged to their Southern Front unit.

=== 15 May ===
- Hamas and Hezbollah fired around 60 Katyusha and heavy rockets and artillery shells at Mount Meron air traffic control base in response to Makki's killing, causing minor damage. They also fired at least one heavy rocket towards the Biranit army base. One of the rockets fired by Hamas fell short of its intended target, instead striking a house in Mansouri, killing a Syrian national and injuring four others.
- A Hezbollah drone crashed in the Lower Galilee for the first time since the start of the conflict. Hezbollah said it launched several drones targeting a surveillance system at an army base near Golani Junction, west of Tiberias. The IDF confirmed that two drones were fired at the Tal Shamayim base, with one being intercepted.
- Lebanese media reported the largest Israeli bombardment of the Baalbek region in the conflict, with targets in the Al-Nabi Shayth and Brital areas coming under attack. A civilian was slightly injured.
- The IDF struck a Hezbollah launch site in southern Lebanon. It also struck two Hezbollah buildings; one in Blida and a Redwan building in Jabal Rezlâne.

=== 16 May ===
- Hezbollah fired 60 Katyusha rockets at the Golan Heights, targeting three IDF bases, in response to Israel's bombing of Baalbek.
- Hezbollah fired a drone carrying S-5 rockets fired at a vehicle in Metula, injuring three soldiers, including one seriously.
- An Israeli strike targeting a car in Qana killed two Hezbollah members.
- The IDF struck ten Hezbollah targets throughout southern Lebanon.

=== 17 May ===
- Three people, including a Hezbollah fighter and two Syrian children, were killed in Israeli airstrikes on Najjariyeh, striking Hezbollah targets, a pickup truck and an orchard. Footage of the aftermath of one of the strikes apparently showed the remains of an Iranian Sayyad-2 surface-to-air missile.
- A barrage of 75 rockets was fired at northern Israel, lightly injuring two people in the Upper Galilee.
- An IDF strike on a car in Majdal Anjar killed an Ezzedine al-Qassam Brigades commander along with his bodyguard and injured two others.
- The IDF attacked Hezbollah targets in Deir Siriane, Kfarhamam, and Odaisseh.

=== 18 May ===
- An Israeli drone strike on a car killed a Hezbollah senior leader and another member on the Damascus–Beirut highway.
- A man was injured when an Israeli drone struck his motorcycle near Naqoura.
- Hezbollah conducted around 15 attacks on Israeli targets.

=== 19 May ===
- Hezbollah fired ten anti-tank missiles targeting Malkiya and Shebaa Farms.
- The IDF struck a building in Maroun al-Ras, killing a Hezbollah member.
- Hezbollah announced the death of another member who died in unclear circumstances.

=== 20 May ===
- At least six Iranian-backed fighters were killed in an Israeli airstrike on a building in Al-Qusayr, Syria. Hezbollah announced one as their own.
- Hezbollah announced the death of two of its members after shelling in Naqoura.
- Shelling in Meiss el Jabal killed two Hezbollah members.
- Hezbollah fired several rockets into northern Israel, lightly wounding a soldier in the Biranit IDF base.
- An Israeli airstrike near Tyre killed Hezbollah coastal rocket commander Qassem Saqlawi.

=== 21 May ===
- A UAV targeted the area of Yaroun and Maroun al-Ras.
- An Israeli airstrike on a car between the Bekaa and Jezzine killed the two Islamic Group fighters.
- Hezbollah announced the death of one of their members.

=== 22 May ===
- An overnight strike on Odaisseh killed two Hezbollah members.
- A UAV crashed into northern Beit Hillel, causing no casualties.
- Israel attacked Hezbollah targets in Meiss Ej Jabal, Ayta ash Shab, and Aalma El Chaeb. It later struck targets in Ayta ash Shab, Marwahin, and Rab El Thalathine.

=== 23 May ===
- An Israeli drone strike on a car heading to Nabatieh killed a Hezbollah member and lightly injured three nearby children.
- Hezbollah fired 30 rockets into the Upper Galilee.
- Two UAVs heading towards Israel were intercepted by fighter jets.

=== 24 May ===
- Hezbollah anti-tank missiles caused damage in Dovev.
- Airstrikes in Meiss el Jabal killed two Hezbollah members.

=== 25 May ===
- An alleged Israeli drone strike on vehicles near Al-Qusayr, Syria killed two Hezbollah members.
- The IDF struck Hezbollah targets in eight locations in southern Lebanon.

=== 26 May ===
- An IDF drone strike on a motorcycle in Naqoura killed a Hezbollah member and injured another person.
- Israeli strikes killed three people in Houla, two in Yaroun, and two in Ayta ash-Shab.
- Hezbollah announced the death of four of its members.
- Hezbollah fired 150 missiles into northern Israel, targeting Kiryat Shmona, the Golan Heights, and IDF targets around Al-Manara and Misgav Am. A man in Kiryat Shmona was lightly wounded.

=== 27 May ===
- Hezbollah fired 25 rockets at northern Israel, striking a home in Metula and sparking a fire in Kiryat Shmona. It later fired 35 rockets at Mount Meron, causing a fire in Safsufa.
- An Israeli drone strike on a motorcycle near the Salah Ghandour hospital in Bint Jbeil killed two people, including a hospital security guard, and injured eight others. It also caused minor damage to the hospital.

=== 28 May ===
- Hezbollah fired three missiles at Shtula.

=== 29 May ===
- A UAV was intercepted by the IDF off the coast of Rosh HaNikra.
- An Israeli airstrike on a military site in Homs killed six Hezbollah members and destroyed trucks carrying weapons. A separate attack in Baniyas killed one civilian and wounded ten others. SOHR blamed the attack on shrapnel after Syrian air defenses intercepted an Israeli missile.
- The IAF struck a Hezbollah position in Khiam, while the IDF shelled areas near Hamoul, Kafr Kila, and Naqoura.

=== 30 May ===
- The IDF struck two Hezbollah military buildings in southern Lebanon in response to rocket fire towards Zar'it.
- Israeli air defenses accidentally intercepted an IDF drone over Shlomi.

=== 31 May ===
- Three people were lightly injured after Hezbollah fired 15 rockets into northern Israel.
- An Israeli drone strike on an ambulance in Naqoura killed an Islamic Health Committee medic and wounded another. Another strike in Aadloun killed a woman and injured four others.
- Hezbollah announced the death of two of its fighters.

== June ==
=== 1 June ===
- Hezbollah fired Burkan rockets at Kiryat Shmona, causing heavy damage to infrastructure and a nearby military base.
- The IDF said that it struck a Hezbollah missile launcher and killed two nearby militants.
- Hezbollah shot down an Israeli Hermes 900 drone over Lebanon with a surface-to-air missile.
- An Israeli drone strike on a motorcycle near Khirbet Selm wounded two people.
- The Islamic Health Committee said that an Israeli airstrike in Siddikine wounded 16 children.

=== 2 June ===
- The IDF attacked Hezbollah targets in Beqaa, Bint Jbeil, Qana, and Baraachit in the morning. It later targeted a weapons storage facility in Meiss Ej Jabal, killing a Hezbollah member.
- Two Hezbollah drones exploded in the area of Katzrin, Golan Heights. Hezbollah later fired 15 Katyusha rockets at the same area, targeting the 210th Golani Brigade headquarters.
- An Israeli airstrike on a home in Houla killed two civilians.
- Fifteen rockets landed in the Galilee, sparking several fires. A rocket attack on Kiryat Shmona lightly wounded two people.

=== 3 June ===
- An Israeli airstrike on a copper plant in Hayyan, Syria killed 17 pro-Iran militants, among them two Iranians (including an IRGC adviser), three Iraqis, three Hezbollah members, and nine Syrians, and caused material damage.
- Hezbollah said that it fired drones at the IDF's headquarters in the Galilee. It also claimed a drone attack in Metula. The IDF confirmed that two drones crashed in northern Israel while a third was intercepted.
- Israeli warplanes reportedly flew over Beirut at low altitude.
- Hezbollah fired 30 rockets at an IDF position in the Golan Heights. No injuries were reported.
- A senior Hezbollah member was killed in an Israeli airstrike in Mazraat Kauthariyet El Rez. Another strike on a motorcycle in Naqoura killed one person and injured another.
- Six Israeli soldiers and five civilians were injured from smoke inhalation while fighting fires sparked by Hezbollah missiles near Kiryat Shmona.

=== 4 June ===
- An IDF airstrike on a motorcycle killed a Hezbollah member in Naqoura and injured another person.
- The IDF struck Hezbollah infrastructure in Ayta ash-Shab and Odaisseh, while Israeli troops shelled areas throughout southern Lebanon.
- An explosive drone crashed in the Mount Hermon area.
- An Israeli interceptor missile failed and exploded near Safed, with its shrapnel causing a fire and wounding a reservist.

=== 5 June ===
- Hezbollah claimed a guided missile attack on an Iron Dome system in Ramot Naftali.
- Hezbollah drone strikes in Hurfeish killed a reserve soldier and wounded ten people, including nine soldiers.

=== 6 June ===
- Israeli fighter jets struck two Hezbollah members and military infrastructure in the area of Aitaroun. Hezbollah confirmed the death of one member.
- A shopping mall in Kiryat Shmona was damaged by a rocket.
- Ori Gordin, a top general of the IDF's Northern Command, announced that Israel had finished preparations to escalate the conflict with Hezbollah.
- Hezbollah said that it fired missiles at Israeli fighter jets over Lebanon, forcing them to retreat.

=== 7 June ===
- The IDF conducted airstrikes against military infrastructure around Jebel Razlan, Ramyah, and Kafr Kila.
- A Hezbollah drone exploded near Sulam following a failed interception by the IDF. Another drone exploded around Shomera.

=== 8 June ===
- An Israeli air raid in Aitaroun killed two people, one of whom the IDF claimed was a Hezbollah fighter, but Hezbollah claimed that both were civilians. It also attacked military infrastructure in Khiam and Kafr Kila.
- Hezbollah announced the death of one of its members by Israeli attacks.
- Hezbollah said it fired Falaq-2 rockets for the first time at an IDF command center in northern Israel.
- Israeli white phosphorus attacks in southern Lebanon reportedly sparked wildfires in Alma al-Shaab.
- Hezbollah said it carried out 11 attacks against Israel, including one against the IDF in Beit Hillel.

=== 9 June ===
- Hezbollah claimed attacks against a site they called "Ramtha" near Shebaa Farms and Israeli artillery positions in Zaoura, Golan Heights.
- The IAF said that it killed a Hezbollah cell in Tyre that fired anti-aircraft missiles at Israeli fighter jets over Lebanon. It also conducted strikes against military infrastructure in Shebaa, Aitaroun and Markaba.

=== 10 June ===
- Hezbollah anti-tank missiles damaged a home in Yir'on. Six anti-tank missiles were launched from northern Lebanon to the Upper Galilee region, causing fires and damaging one house in Manara.
- The IDF shot down two drones near Nahariya, while two others caused damage in Kabri.
- Israeli interceptor missiles exploded over Acre after falsely identifying an aerial target, with their shrapnel lightly injuring a woman.
- Hezbollah claimed a drone attack on an IDF outpost in the Golan Heights, which it said caused a fire and injured soldiers.
- Hezbollah shot down an Israeli Hermes 900 drone with a surface-to-air missile over Rihan.
- Five people were lightly injured from a fire caused by a Hezbollah drone in northern Israel.
- Israeli missile strikes on tankers and a building in Hermel killed three Hezbollah members and injured three others. The IDF later said that it was targeting a site belonging to Hezbollah's Unit 4400 in the area. Six other attacks on the Israel-Syria border were also carried out.

=== 11 June ===
- Around 50 Katyusha rockets were fired into the central Golan Heights, causing no injuries.
- Hezbollah said that it forced an Israeli fighter jet to retreat from Lebanon after firing anti-aircraft missiles at it.
- A drone from Lebanon was intercepted after crossing into the Upper Galilee.
- An Israeli strike on a command and control center in Jwaya killed senior Hezbollah commander Taleb Abdallah and three other militants. Abdallah was the highest-ranking member killed since the conflict began. Hezbollah vowed to intensify its attacks in response.

=== 12 June ===
- Hezbollah launched a barrage of about 90 rockets into Israel targeting an IDF factory, military headquarters in Ein Zeitim and Ami'ad, and an air surveillance station in Meron. It later fired another 70 at the Mount Meron area, and then ten more at Zar'it, bringing the total number of launches to 170. It increased to 215 by the late afternoon.
- The IAF struck two Hezbollah launch sites in Taybeh and Markaba, while the IDF shelled launch sites in Rachaya Al Foukhar.
- An anti-tank missile struck and damaged a Plasan factory in Sasa.
- Hezbollah announced the death of one of its members.
- Israeli airstrikes in Yater destroyed a home, injuring one person, and white phosphorus shells were reportedly fired towards Odaisseh.

=== 13 June ===
- Hezbollah fired 150 rockets and 30 UAVs at 15 targets in northern Israel and the Golan Heights, wounding two people and starting fires.
- An Israeli naval missile strike on a building used by Hezbollah in Jennata killed two civilians and wounded over 20 others, causing the building to collapse.
- The IDF struck Hezbollah military infrastructure in Deir Siriane and the Al-Jarmal area.
- Israeli soldiers launched a flaming projectile into Lebanon using a trebuchet to burn down vegetation used by Hezbollah as cover.

=== 14 June ===
- The IAF struck Hezbollah infrastructure in Odaisseh and Kafr Kila.
- Hezbollah fired 30 rockets at Kiryat Shmona, causing fires in surrounding areas.

=== 15 June ===
- Several Hezbollah UAVs crashed near Goren, starting a fire.
- Hezbollah struck the Mount Meron air base with two missiles.
- The IAF struck Hezbollah infrastructure in Kafr Kila. It later struck a weapons depot in Aitaroun and additional infrastructure in Chihine and Ayta ash-Shab.
- The IDF carried out an airstrike against a Hezbollah member on a motorcycle in Aitaroun. The PIJ later announced the death of one of its members in southern Lebanon.

=== 16 June ===
- The IAF struck Hezbollah infrastructure in Shaqra, Taybeh, Muhajbib, and Kafr Kila.

=== 17 June ===
- Amos Hochstein, a senior advisor to US President Joe Biden, arrived to Israel to de-escalate tensions between Israel and Hezbollah.
- An Israeli drone strike on a vehicle in Selaa killed a senior Hezbollah member.
- An unknown aerial target was intercepted near Acre's maritime airspace.
- The IAF struck sites in Meiss Ej Jabal, Aitaroun, Ayta ash Shab and Shaqra.

=== 18 June ===
- Hezbollah published a video purportedly showing footage captured by surveillance aircraft in northern Israel, including Haifa.
- An Israeli airstrike in the Tyre area wounded eight people.
- The IAF targeted Hezbollah infrastructure in Taybeh, Odaisseh, Jibbain, and Ayta ash Shab.
- The IDF intercepted an aerial target in the maritime airspace of the Gesher HaZiv area.
- Top IDF generals approved "operational plans" for a ground offensive into Lebanon during an assessment.

=== 19 June ===
- The IAF attacked Hezbollah members in Yaroun and Rashit. The attack in Yaroun reportedly killed three members, with Hezbollah confirming one.
- Israeli drone strikes targeting Syrian military sites in Quneitra and Daraa killed an officer and caused damage.
- An explosive drone struck Metula, damaging several vehicles. Additional drones were intercepted over Sde Eliezer and southern Lebanon.
- Fifteen rocket launches targeting Kiryat Shmona were detected.
- The IAF struck military infrastructure in Khiam, Tyre, Baraachit and Borgholiyeh, while artillery hit launch sites.
- Hezbollah leader Hassan Nasrallah threatened to go to war with Cyprus if it opened airports and military bases to the IDF. In response, Cypriot President Nikos Christodoulides said that his country was not involved in any military conflicts.

=== 20 June ===
- An Israeli airstrike targeting a vehicle in Deir Kila killed regional Hezbollah commander Abbas Ibrahim Hamza Hamada.
- Hezbollah fired 25 Katyusha rockets at the western Galilee and later 20 more in response to Hamada's killing. It claimed it was targeting an IDF base near Zar'it.
- The IDF struck Hezbollah weapons depots in Hula and Talloussa, while fighter jets struck infrastructure in Meiss Ej Jabal, Aitaroun, and Yaroun and artillery shelled several other targets.

=== 21 June ===
- Several launches into Israel from southern Lebanon were detected, causing no damage. Aerial targets were intercepted in the areas of Kela and Sha'al.
- The IDF attacked Hezbollah targets in Taybeh, Deir Siriane, Ghajar, Kfarhamam and Labbouneh.
- CNN reported that US officials vowed to provide support to Israel in a war with Hezbollah during a meeting with Israeli officials in Washington, D.C..

=== 22 June ===
- An Israeli airstrike on a vehicle in the Beqaa Valley killed senior Hamas supplier Ayman Ratma.
- The Ministry of Foreign Affairs of Kuwait issued a notice urging its citizens to evacuate Lebanon.
- Two homes were struck by anti-tank missiles in Metula, causing fires.

=== 23 June ===
- Hezbollah said that it conducted drone attacks on a barracks in Beit Hillel.
- The IAF attacked Hezbollah targets in Kafr Kila and Taybeh. It later struck Hezbollah infrastructure and outposts in Khiam and Ramyeh, while the IDF shelled the area of Aalma Ech Chaab.
- A UAV was intercepted nearby a major Rafael factory in the Lower Galilee.
- Four drones exploded near a barracks in Ayelet HaShahar, severely wounding one Israeli soldier.
- The Daily Telegraph, citing Lebanese whistleblowers, reported that Hezbollah was storing weapons in the Beirut–Rafic Hariri International Airport.

=== 25 June ===
- The IAF conducted airstrikes against Hezbollah infrastructure in Khiam and Odaisseh, while the IDF shelled the areas of Blida, Labbouneh, Naqoura, and Kfarchouba.
- The Canadian Foreign Ministry issued a statement urging its citizens to leave Lebanon.

=== 26 June ===
- The IAF conducted overnight airstrikes against Hezbollah infrastructure in Matmoura and Chebaa.
- Hezbollah fired five anti-tank missiles at Metula.
- The foreign ministries of Germany and the Netherlands urged their citizens to evacuate Lebanon.
- An Israeli strike on a building in Nabatiyeh wounded five people and destroyed the building.
- Israeli airstrikes near Sayyida Zeinab, southern Syria killed two people and injured one officer.

=== 27 June ===
- An Israeli airstrike reportedly targeted a motorcycle in Sohmor.
- Two drones struck the Rosh HaNikra area. Hezbollah claimed that it conducted drone attacks against a naval base near the kibbutz.
- The IAF killed a Hezbollah drone operator from the group's air unit. It also conducted strikes in Houla and Aitaroun, while the IDF shelled Hamoul and Naqoura.
- A barrage of between 20 and 40 rockets was fired by Hezbollah at Safed, causing power outages.

=== 28 June ===
- The IDF intercepted drones over the Upper Galilee and the Galilee panhandle. Three other drones struck the Western Galilee.
- Several anti-tank missiles were fired from Lebanon into northern Israel, damaging a home in Shlomi and causing no injuries. Hezbollah took responsibility for them, claiming to have been targeting an IDF base near Kiryat Shmona and another in the Western Galilee.
- The IDF conducted an airstrike on a building housing a group of Hezbollah members in Kafr Kila. It also struck targets in Chihine and Naqoura. It later struck a building belonging to Hezbollah's air defense unit in Jabal Safi. The strikes killed seven militants in total.
- The IDF detected 25 launches from Lebanon targeting northeastern Israel, causing damage and killing two horses in Betzet.
- Hezbollah announced the death of one of its members in Nabatieh.

=== 29 June ===
- The IDF struck Hezbollah targets in the Houla area, killing one member.
- Two anti-tank missiles struck Misgav Am, causing no injuries.
- The Saudi embassy in Lebanon urged its citizens to leave Lebanon and advised against travel to the country.

=== 30 June ===
- The IAF struck Hezbollah infrastructure in Taybeh and Rab El Thalathine. It later struck targets in Kafr Kila and Houla, killing three militants. It conducted further strikes against Hezbollah targets in Markaba and Ayta ash Shab in the late evening.
- Hezbollah anti-tank missiles fell into an open area in Beit Hillel and damaged a home in Metula.
- Hezbollah fired several UAVs at northern Israel and the Golan Heights, with one striking Merom Golan and injuring 18 soldiers, one seriously.

== July ==
=== 1 July ===
- The IAF targeted Hezbollah infrastructure in Kafr Kila, Houla, El Biyada, and Rab El Thalathine. It later struck a group of Hezbollah members at a building in Blida.
- A home in Metula was struck by a mortar, causing no casualties.
- Hezbollah attacked a building housing Israeli troops in Ramot Naftali.
- Hezbollah announced the death of one of its members.
- Five Hezbollah rockets struck open areas in the Galilee, causing no casualties.

=== 2 July ===
- Hezbollah fired 15 rockets at Kiryat Shmona, causing no casualties.
- An Israeli missile strike targeting farmers in Al-Zalutiyah killed one civilian. A separate drone strike on the Taybeh power plant caused a fire and power outage.
- The IDF struck a Hezbollah military building in Yarin.

=== 3 July ===
- Senior Hezbollah field commander Mohammed Nasser was killed in an Israeli airstrike in Tyre.
- The IAF carried out strikes on Hezbollah infrastructure in Leida, Yaroun, Tayr Harfa, and Itatron, while the IDF shelled targets in Lavona and Shachin.
- Hezbollah claimed that it fired 100 Katyusha rockets at IDF positions. The IDF said that rockets targeting Kiryat Shmona were intercepted or struck open areas. The IAF struck three launch sites in southern Lebanon in response.

=== 4 July ===
- Hezbollah fired 200 rockets and 20 drones targeting ten IDF bases in northern Israel and the Golan Heights, killing a reservist officer. Over ten fires were caused, including at a mall in Acre. Two people were lightly injured from falls while going to shelters.
- The IAF conducted strikes against Hezbollah infrastructure in Ramyeh and Houla, where a drone strike killed at least one person. It later struck infrastructure in Meiss Ej Jabal and Ayta ash Shab.
- Israeli fighter jets exceeded the sound barrier over several parts of Lebanon, including Beirut.

=== 5 July ===
- The IDF announced overnight airstrikes on Hezbollah infrastructure in Jibbain and Kfarhamam and shelling in Naqoura. The IAF later struck a Hezbollah anti-aircraft missile launcher and infrastructure in Markaba.
- Five missiles fell into areas in Zar'it and the Shebaa Farms. The IDF attacked the launch sites. Another barrage of five rockets targeting Kiryat Shmona lightly injured two soldiers.
- Hezbollah claimed to have bombed an IDF position in the occupied Kfarchouba hills.

=== 6 July ===
- An Israeli drone strike near Shaat, Baalbek killed Meitham Mustafa Altaar, a senior member of Hezbollah's air defense unit.
- The IAF struck Hezbollah sites in Houla and Odaisseh, while the IDF shelled targets in Yaroun, Maroun El Ras, and Blida.

=== 7 July ===
- Hezbollah fired dozens of rockets at northern Israel, with two striking an army post near Zar'it, injuring a soldier and two civilians, including an American national who was in serious condition. Another rocket struck a soccer stadium in Kiryat Shmona.
- Hezbollah conducted a drone attack against Mount Hermon.

=== 8 July ===
- An Israeli airstrike near Qlaileh killed a Hezbollah member and wounded another.
- The IAF struck Hezbollah sites in Jabal Tourah, Qabrikha, Tallouseh, Houla, and Ayta ash Shab while the IDF shelled several targets in southern Lebanon.

=== 9 July ===
- An Israeli airstrike on the Beirut–Damascus highway in Syria killed two Hezbollah members and seriously wounded a Syrian driver. A former bodyguard of Hassan Nasrallah was among the casualties.
- The IAF struck two Hezbollah members in Rab al-Thalathine who launched rockets at Israel.
- Hezbollah published drone footage of IDF bases in the Golan Heights and an Israeli city.
- Hezbollah fired 40 rockets at the Golan Heights, striking a vehicle and killing two civilians.
- A suspected Israeli airstrike on the Arab al-Mulk bay, Syria caused material damage.

=== 10 July ===
- The IAF struck Hezbollah air defense sites in Janta, central Lebanon. It also struck sites in Baraachit and Kafr Kila. It later struck Hezbollah members in Tayr Harfa and infrastructure in Taybeh.
- The IDF struck Syrian Army infrastructure in the Golan Heights.
- An Israeli soldier was lightly wounded when three UAVs from Lebanon struck the area of Beit Hameches.

=== 11 July ===
- The IDF conducted a drone strike on a truck transporting a Hezbollah rocket launcher in Ayta ash Shab, while the IAF struck sites in Rab al-Thalathine, Odaisseh, Ramyeh and Khiam. The IAF later struck several infrastructures throughout southern Lebanon, including in Yarine, Ramyeh, Jibbain and Tayr Harfa.
- A Hezbollah drone attack on the western Galilee killed a reservist and damaged a home and two vehicles in Kabri.

=== 12 July ===
- The IAF struck Hezbollah sites in Ramyeh, Jebbayn, Tayr Harfa and Kafr Kila while a Hezbollah member was targeted by a drone strike in Rashaya al-Foukhar.
- Hezbollah fired several rockets at Shebaa Farms, Margaliot and Metula, causing no casualties.
- Hezbollah announced the death of one of its members.

=== 13 July ===
- Two men were killed in an Israeli drone strike on their car in Khardali, Lebanon. The dead were allegedly the father and uncle of a Hezbollah militant previously killed by Israel.
- A politician of the Amal Movement was killed in a separate IDF attack on Khardali.
- Ten rockets were fired from Lebanon at Kiryat Shmona, causing no casualties. Hezbollah later fired two barrages at the city consisting of 15 and eight rockets respectively, injuring four soldiers.
- The IDF struck Hezbollah rocket launchers in southern Lebanon that were used against northern Israeli communities. The IAF also struck two Hezbollah members in Deir Mimas.
- Israeli air defenses intercepted two drones approaching Israeli airspace.

=== 14 July ===
- Israeli airstrikes in Damascus targeting military sites and a building killed one soldier and injured three others.
- Hezbollah claimed attacks on Israeli soldiers near Hadab Yarin, a "newly created 91st Division headquarters" in Ayelet HaShahar, Ruwaisaat al-Alam and Ramtha in occupied Kfarchouba.
- German authorities arrested a suspected Hezbollah member for procuring drone components used in attacks on Israel.

=== 15 July ===
- An Israeli airstrike on a vehicle in Saboura, Syria killed a prominent businessman with links to the Syrian government.
- The IDF struck Hezbollah sites in the Jabel region and Kafr Kila.
- An Israeli airstrike on Bint Jbeil killed three civilians and wounded three others.
- Hezbollah fired 20 rockets at Kiryat Shmona, causing no casualties.

=== 16 July ===
- Hezbollah fired at least 40 rockets at Kiryat Shmona, causing damage but no casualties. It later fired ten more rockets at the western Galilee, and another 20–30 at Mount Meron in the night.
- Three Syrian children were killed in an Israeli airstrike in Umm Toot, close to the Yarine area. Another drone strike on the Kfar Tebnit road killed two Syrians.
- The IAF struck two Hezbollah members near Mansouri, while the IDF shelled targets in Kafr Kila, Deir Mimas and Ayta ash Shab. The IAF later struck a rocket launcher near Blat and a Hezbollah cell in Yarine. It struck Hezbollah infrastructure in Kafr Kila, Ayta ash Shab and Itatron in the night.

=== 17 July ===
- Hassan Nasrallah threatened to attack Israeli communities not yet targeted by Hezbollah if civilian casualties continued in Lebanon.

=== 18 July ===
- An IDF strike on a car in Ghazzeh, eastern Lebanon killed Mohammad Hamed Gebara, an Islamic Group commander who planned and conducted attacks in collaboration with Hamas.
- An Israeli reservist died from wounds he sustained in a Hezbollah attack in June.
- Israeli airstrikes in Safad El Battikh and Jumayjimah killed five people, including a senior Radwan commander, and injured at least 18 others.
- The IAF killed a Hezbollah member in the area of Qana.
- Hezbollah claimed nine launches toward Israel, including one against an IDF base not yet targeted by the group.
- The IDF intercepted a drone in the western Galilee and the Golan Heights.
- Spanish police arrested three people for supplying Hezbollah with explosive drone components.

=== 19 July ===
- Hezbollah fired 65 rockets into the Galilee targeting Abirim, Neve Ziv, Manot and Metula.
- The IDF intercepted a UAV from Lebanon that crossed into Israeli airspace.
- The IAF struck Hezbollah targets in Blida, Tayr Harfa and Houla.

=== 20 July ===
- The IAF struck Hezbollah buildings in Khoula.
- An Israeli airstrike on a car in Burj al-Muluk wounded several nearby Syrian civilians, including children.
- Around 45 rockets were fired into northern Israel and the Golan Heights from Lebanon in three barrages. Hezbollah said it targeted Dafna with dozens of rockets, while Hamas claimed attacks from Lebanon on an IDF post in Shomera.
- A Hezbollah drone strike in the northern Golan Heights injured two Israeli soldiers.
- An Israeli airstrike targeting an ammunition depot in Aadloun wounded six civilians.

=== 21 July ===
- The IAF conducted strikes against two Hezbollah weapon storage facilities in southern Lebanon, killing a Hezbollah fighter and wounding others. It later struck Hezbollah sites in Ayta ash Shab, Khiam and Yarine.
- Two Hezbollah fighters were killed in an Israeli drone strike on a home in Houla.
- Hezbollah attacks struck a school and Dafna and damaged buildings in Kfar Szold, while drones fell in areas of Hanita and Ya'ara, causing a fire.

=== 22 July ===
- A fighter from the Syrian Social Nationalist Party's military wing was killed after an IDF strike on Chihine.
- The IAF struck a Hezbollah fighter entering a building in Chihine and areas in Meiss Ej Jabal and Kfarchouba. It later struck infrastructure in Yater, Khiam and Hanine, and in Ayta ash Shab in the evening.
- Seven Hezbollah UAVs targeting northern Israel were intercepted by air defenses.
- Hezbollah fired around ten rockets at Tzuriel.

=== 23 July ===
- An Israeli drone strike on a truck in Shaqra killed a Hezbollah member and wounded another.
- Hezbollah fired drones at the IDF's Mount Neria base.
- Israeli warplanes broke the sound barrier over several parts of Lebanon, including Beirut.

=== 24 July ===
- Hezbollah published drone footage of the Ramat David Airbase.
- The IAF struck Hezbollah targets in Chihine and Kfarhamam.
- An Israeli soldier was seriously wounded by a Hezbollah rocket barrage on Shebaa Farms.

=== 25 July ===
- Hezbollah claimed that it shelled Hanita with artillery after three projectiles were launched toward the kibbutz.
- Hezbollah claimed that it forced Israeli warplanes to retreat from Lebanon by firing anti-aircraft missiles.
- The IAF struck Hezbollah targets in Odaisseh, Meiss Ej Jabal and Chihine. The IDF later conducted a drone strike on a Hezbollah fighter in Rab al-Thalathine. The IAF later conducted strikes against Hezbollah targets in Aitaroun and Ayta ash Shab in the evening.
- Shrapnel from unsuccessful attempts by the IDF to intercept Hezbollah drones caused fires in northern Israel.

=== 26 July ===
- Israeli airstrikes on structures in Markaba killed two senior Hezbollah members.
- The IAF struck Hezbollah structures in Ayta ash Shab and Kfarchouba and a rocket launcher in Houla.
