= Timeline of the Hezbollah–Israel conflict (2023–present) =

This is a chronological timeline of the Hezbollah–Israel conflict since October 2023. The detailed timelines are split into different articles due to their length.

== 8 October – 23 November 2023 ==
This timeline begins at the start of the conflict, and ends before the start of the first 2023 Gaza war ceasefire.

- Initial clashes following October 7 Hamas attack (beginning 8 October 2023)
- Killing of Issam Abdallah

== 24 November 2023 – 1 January 2024 ==
This timeline begins at the start of the 2023 Gaza war ceasefire, and ends prior to the assassination of Saleh al-Arouri.

- First Gaza ceasefire (24 November 2023 – 30 November 2023)
- Clashes resume (1 December 2023)

== 2 January – 31 March 2024 ==
This timeline begins on the day of the assassination of Saleh al-Arouri, and ends prior to the Israeli airstrike on the Iranian consulate in Damascus.

- Assassination of Saleh al-Arouri (2 January 2024)

== 1 April – 26 July 2024 ==
This timeline begins on the day of the Israeli airstrike on the Iranian consulate in Damascus, and ends prior to the Majdal Shams attack.

- Israeli airstrike on the Iranian consulate in Damascus (1 April 2024)
- April 2024 Iranian strikes on Israel (13 April 2024)

== 27 July 2024 – 16 September 2024 ==
This timeline begins on the day of the Majdal Shams attack, and ends prior to the Lebanon electronic device explosions.

- Majdal Shams attack (27 July 2024)
- Killing of Fuad Shukr (30 July 2024)
- August 2024 Nabatieh attack (17 August 2024)
- August 2024 Israel–Lebanon strikes (25 August 2024)

== 17 September 2024 – 26 November 2024 ==
This timeline begins on the day of the Lebanon pager explosions, and ends prior to the 2024 Israel–Lebanon ceasefire agreement.

- 2024 Lebanon electronic device attacks (17–18 September 2024)
- 20 September 2024 Beirut attack (20 September 2024)
- September 2024 Israeli attacks against Lebanon (major escalation beginning 23 September 2024)
- 2024 Hezbollah headquarters strike (27 September 2024)
- 2024 Israeli invasion of Lebanon (1 October 2024)

== 27 November 2024 – 26 February 2026 ==
This timeline begins on the day of the 2024 Israel–Lebanon ceasefire agreement, and ends on 26 February 2026.

- 2024 Israel–Lebanon ceasefire agreement (27 November 2024)

== 2 March 2026 – present ==
This timeline begins on the day Hezbollah fired projectiles towards Israel from Lebanon following the start of the 2026 Iran war, and continues to the present.

- 2026 Lebanon war (2 March 2026)
- 2026 Israel–Lebanon ceasefire (16 April 2026)

== See also ==
- Attacks on journalists during the Israel–Hezbollah conflict (2023–present)
- Middle Eastern crisis (2023–present)
- Timeline of the Gaza war
- Timeline of the Red Sea crisis
