= Timeline of the Israel–Hezbollah conflict (24 November 2023 – 1 January 2024) =

This timeline of the Israel–Hezbollah conflict covers the period from 24 November 2023, when the 2023 Gaza war ceasefire began, until 1 January 2024, one day prior to the assassination of Saleh al-Arouri.

Attacks from both sides began immediately after the ceasefire ended on 30 November 2023 and clashes continued throughout this period.

== 24 November — 30 November (ceasefire) ==
After the temporary Gaza ceasefire on 24 November, Hezbollah stopped its military operations briefly which also prompted the Israel Defense Forces (IDF) to stop the shelling on targets in southern Lebanon. Many displaced civilians returned to their homes amid the calm.

=== 24 November ===
- The IDF intercepted a surface-to-air missile fired at its aircraft in Lebanese territory.
- Hezbollah claimed 23 other attacks into northern Israel.

=== 25 November ===
- A UNIFIL patrol unit was hit by IDF gunfire in the vicinity of Aitaroun where there were no casualties. UNIFIL condemned the incident and called on parties to be reminded "of their obligations to protect peacekeepers and avoid putting the men and women who are working to restore stability at risk."

=== 28 November ===
- An Israeli shell reportedly struck the outskirts of a town in southern Lebanon, though a spokesperson for the IDF said they were not aware of the incident.

=== 29 November ===
- Israeli soldiers allegedly opened fire in the vicinity of a Lebanese Army vehicle during a patrol next to a UNIFIL site near Hula. In the same region, IDF soldiers fired "bursts of machine gun fire".

=== 30 November ===
- The IDF intercepted an unspecified aerial object in northern Israel.

== December ==
The ceasefire expires, and clashes resume.

=== 1 December ===
- Hezbollah claimed five attacks into the Israel–Lebanon border.
- The IDF shelled Hula, killing two civilians, and the village of Jibbain, killing an additional person.
- The IDF also struck a Hezbollah site and a Hezbollah cell preparing to carry out an attack near Malkia. Hezbollah announced the death of one of their members, presumably from one of the IDF strikes.

=== 2 December ===
- Hezbollah fired several rockets at Israeli army posts along the border. Israel responded with airstrikes and artillery shelling against Hezbollah sites.
- Hezbollah stated that one of its fighters were killed.

=== 3 December ===
- Hezbollah fired one anti-tank guided missile targeting an IDF base in Beit Hillel, injuring 11 Israelis.
- Global Affairs Canada announced that a Canadian citizen was killed in Lebanon.

=== 4 December ===
- Several rockets fired from Lebanon at the Mount Dov area, which all landed in open areas. Another projectile was fired at Misgav Am. No injuries were reported, and the IDF responded by shelling the sources of the fire.
- Hamas announced the creation of a new unit in Lebanon named the "Al-Aqsa Flood Vanguards" and called on "the youth and men of our people to join the vanguard resistance fighters and take part in shaping the future and liberating Jerusalem and the al-Aqsa Mosque." This created a negative reaction by many Lebanese politicians as they said that it would be a threat to Lebanon's sovereignty.

=== 5 December ===
- Israeli officials said a drone fired from Lebanon entered Israeli airspace and crashed near Margaliot. IDF sappers examined the device.
- One Lebanese soldier was killed and three others were injured by an Israeli attack on a Lebanese Army base in Odaisseh. The IDF later apologized for the incident, saying that it would investigate.
- A farm worker from Syria was killed in an Israeli artillery attack on a poultry farm near Arnoun that also injured two of his relatives.

=== 6 December ===
- Israeli defense minister Yoav Gallant met with mayors and local council heads in Nahariya to discuss the threat of Hezbollah to northern residents. Gallant said that if diplomacy fails, Israel will use its military to force Hezbollah north of the Litani River.
- Hezbollah claimed 10 attacks into Israeli territory from Lebanon.

=== 7 December ===
- An Israeli civilian was killed by an anti-tank missile in Mattat. The IDF returned fire and struck the location where the missile originated, and several other locations as well.
- Unspecified Iranian-backed militias fired two rockets from Syria towards Buq'ata, in the Israeli-occupied Golan Heights.
- Israeli Prime Minister Benjamin Netanyahu said "If Hezbollah chooses to start an all-out war, then it will single-handedly turn Beirut and South Lebanon, not far from here, into Gaza and Khan Yunis."

=== 8 December ===
- The IDF conducted multiple strikes on unspecified Iranian-backed targets in southern Syria in retaliation for rocket strikes into the Golan Heights the day prior.
- Hezbollah announced that two of their members were killed in Syria.
- Hezbollah and other Iranian-backed militias claimed 13 attacks into northern Israel, including a Burkan-2 rocket attack and an anti-tank guided missile attack claimed by Hezbollah.

=== 10 December ===
- A Hezbollah drone attack on an IDF base in Western Galilee injured six Israeli soldiers. Two of the drones sent were shot down by the Iron Dome defense system.
- The Israeli Air Force (IAF) carried out a wave of airstrikes against Hezbollah targets in southern Lebanon.
- An anti-tank missile squad was struck as it attempted to carry out an attack near Zar'it.
- IAF airstrikes in Sayyidah Zaynab, Syria killed four Hezbollah fighters.

=== 11 December ===
- The mayor of the southern Lebanese village of Taybeh was killed in an Israeli airstrike.
- Two other Hezbollah fighters were killed by Israeli airstrikes and artillery shelling in Aitaroun, and three civilians were injured. Other airstrikes were carried out by the IAF, destroying five houses and damaging 17 others.
- Four batches of missiles fired from Lebanon towards northern Israel were intercepted by the Iron Dome defense system, while the Islamic Resistance claimed it attacked several Israeli sites. According to Israeli media, three soldiers were injured.
- Hezbollah and other Iranian-backed militias attacked nine Israeli towns and military positions.
- Israeli war cabinet minister and former defense minister Benny Gantz discussed security in northern Israel in a phone call with US Secretary of State Antony Blinken. Gantz said he conveyed that Hezbollah's heightened aggression and attacks mean that Israel must "remove" the threat from northern Israel. Gantz's statement singled out the Lebanese state, not just Hezbollah, and called for international pressure on Lebanon to stop attacks on its southern border.

=== 14 December ===
- The IDF struck several targets in southern Lebanon including mosques and civilian homes. It was reported that one house was struck by an Israeli drone in Ayta ash Shab and another one in Mays al-Jabal.
- Hezbollah said it struck the IDF's Yiftah and Shomera Barracks in northern Israel and claimed that the attacks resulted in casualties.

=== 15 December ===
- The Syrian Social Nationalist Party in Lebanon announced the death of one member of their military wing, the Eagles of the Whirlwind.
- The IDF said that one in five rockets launched by Hezbollah had landed in Lebanese territory and published an infographic showing failed rocket launches into Israel.

=== 16 December ===
- A soldier from the IDF's 129th Battalion was killed by a Hezbollah drone strike near Margaliot, which also caused a fire in a building. Two other soldiers were injured. Another drone was shot down by the IDF, which also responded to the infiltrations by shelling targets. The IAF later hit several Hezbollah targets inside Lebanon, including rocket launch sites and military infrastructure.
- Hezbollah announced that one of its members was killed.

=== 17 December ===
- The IDF hit several launch sites and Hezbollah facilities in response to attacks from the latter.

=== 18 December ===
- Hezbollah attacked Israeli forces near Hanita and fired rockets targeting Kiryat Shmona in retaliation for an IDF strike near the funeral of one of their members.
- Unspecified fighters carried out four rocket attacks including an anti-tank guided missile attack and launched one drone into northern Israel.

=== 19 December ===
- An IDF drone killed a civilian riding his motorbike in Rab El Thalathine.
- Israeli bombings killed three Hezbollah fighters and wounded a displaced Syrian refugee, while also destroying five houses and damaging another 19.
- Hezbollah claimed it destroyed a Merkava tank and killed its crew in a series of attacks on Israeli sites.

=== 20 December ===
- Hezbollah announced the deaths of two of its members in clashes with the IDF in Blida and Ayta al-Jabal.
- The Lebanese state-owned National News Agency (NNA) reported that a man was killed by IDF snipers in his car in Kafr Kila.

=== 21 December ===
- An elderly woman was killed and her husband was injured in an Israeli airstrike in southern Lebanon.
- Two Israeli civilians were wounded by Hezbollah rocket attacks in Dovev. A vehicle in Avivim was hit by an anti-tank missile.

=== 22 December ===
- The IDF announced that a soldier of the 188th Armored Brigade was killed and another was seriously wounded by a Hezbollah rocket attack in the Shtula area.

=== 23 December ===
- In the morning IDF aircraft bombed a house in Kafr Kila and intense artillery fire also took place on the outskirts of Deir Mimas and also hitting the vicinity of the Saint Mamas Monastery.
- The Israeli army conducted a raid near a UNIFL center along the Khardali river.
- An Al-Manar cameraman was injured in the eye after an IDF attack on a road in the al-Khardali area where correspondents of MTV and NNA were also passing.
- Hezbollah announced that two of their members were killed.

=== 24 December ===
- An anti-tank missile hit a home in Avivim, causing significant damage and no injuries.
- The IDF carried out strikes against numerous Hezbollah targets in response to barrages of rockets which targeted communities in northern Israel.

=== 25 December ===
- The outskirts of Naqoura, Hani, and Wadi Hamul were targeted by IDF artillery.
- Senior IRGC general Sayyed Razi Mousavi was killed in an Israeli airstrike in Damascus. The Syrian Observatory for Human Rights said that three other people were killed by the airstrike.
- The IDF hit a house in Kfar Kila setting it on fire and killing its homeowner. Hezbollah confirmed that the victim was one of their members.
- Hezbollah announced that it struck the Beit Hilal military base and a gathering of Israeli soldiers near Birkat Risha.

=== 26 December ===
- Nine Israeli soldiers and a civilian were wounded when two anti-tank missiles hit a church in Iqrit.
- The IDF announced that a sergeant was killed by rocket fire from Lebanon.
- IDF warplanes flew over the capital Beirut.
- An Israeli tank reportedly "neutralized a threat" in Lebanon as the IDF struck Hezbollah sites in the country.
- Two Hezbollah fighters and a member of the Lebanese Civil Defense were killed and five civilians were injured during clashes between Israel and Hezbollah. An additional eight houses were destroyed, and 29 other houses and five cars were damaged.

=== 27 December ===
- A Hezbollah fighter and two of his relatives were killed in an IDF airstrike on Bint Jbeil. Two of the victims were Australian citizens.
- Hezbollah targeted Israeli military sites in the Shebaa Farms using drones and 12 missiles.
- An Indonesian UNIFL peacekeeper was injured after a patrol was attacked by a group of young men in Taybeh.
- Hezbollah announced the death of two of its fighters.
- Israeli warplanes flew over Beirut and Mount Lebanon at a medium altitude. Another group of warplanes flew at a low altitude above Sidon and Zahrani.

=== 28 December ===
- The IDF reportedly intercepted rockets and a drone over northern Israel.
- Israel warplanes bombed the outskirts of Ayta ash Shaab and Ramyah.
- Hezbollah launched artillery towards IDF positions in the hills of Kfarchouba.
- Missiles landed near Kiryat Shmona without activating the town's sirens.
- An anti-tank missile squad that fired missiles towards Israel was hit in Yaroun.
- A group of young men from Kafr Kila intercepted a French UNIFIL patrol that was passing by.
- Israel carried out airstrikes in southern Syria and near Damascus, with one particular attack reportedly killing 11 senior commanders of the IRGC in Damascus International Airport and injuring Nur Rashid, the IRGC commander for eastern Syria.

=== 29 December ===
- Several missiles from southern Lebanon were fired towards Dovev and Bar'am by Hezbollah.
- The IDF struck a Hezbollah anti-tank missile squad in Aitaroun.
- A vehicle in southern Lebanon was struck by a UAV allegedly fired by Israel as part of a reported assassination attempt.
- IDF warplanes flew at a very low altitude over Marjayoun and Al Kharali.
- IDF carried strikes on Hezbollah sites in Hamoul in response to attacks on the border.
- The IDF said that intensive strikes were aimed at driving Hezbollah from the border.
- At the United Nations Security Council, Israel promised "full-scale war" on Hezbollah if attacks continue.

=== 30 December ===
- The IDF said it had attacked two Hezbollah sites in southern Lebanon.
- Hezbollah announced that four of its members were killed in an airstrike in Deir ez Zor, Syria.
- Two projectiles from Syria landed in open areas in the Golan Heights.
- 23 pro-Iranian militants were killed and 18 were wounded by airstrikes "likely" conducted by Israel in eastern Syria.
  - Four Hezbollah members and two other militants were killed in three airstrikes at the Iraq–Syria border.
  - The vicinity of Aleppo International Airport was hit by airstrikes, killing five Iranian-backed militiamen and three civilians.
- The IDF conducted airstrikes on what it called "terrorist infrastructure" in Kafr Kila. In response, Hezbollah attacked an IDF position in Harj Adathir.

=== 31 December ===
- Hezbollah announced that one of its members was killed in clashes with the IDF.
- The IDF said it struck three Hezbollah anti-tank squads in southern Lebanon.

== January ==
=== 1 January ===
- The IDF said five of its soldiers were wounded by fire from Lebanon.
- The IDF said it struck a Hezbollah cell while it prepared to launch drones at communities in northern Israel.
- Three Hezbollah members were killed after an IDF raid on two houses in Kafr Kila.
