= Timeline of the Israel–Hezbollah conflict (8 October – 23 November 2023) =

This timeline of the Israel–Hezbollah conflict covers the period from 8 October 2023, when Hezbollah launched rocket strikes on Israel in response to the 7 October Hamas-led attack on Israel, until the beginning of the 2023 Gaza war ceasefire which lasted from 24 November 2023 to 30 November 2023.

Hezbollah began by launching rockets at the Israeli-occupied Shebaa Farms region, and there were a series of retaliatory attacks until the ceasefire began.

== October ==
=== 8 October ===
IDF footage of strike on Hezbollah infrastructure in the Shebaa Farms

- In the morning, Hezbollah fired rockets and shells at the Shebaa Farms region; in response, the Israel Defense Forces (IDF) fired artillery shells and a drone into southern Lebanon. Two Lebanese children were reportedly injured by broken glass.

=== 9 October ===
- Israel exchanged a series of airstrikes on Southern Lebanon near the towns of Marwahin, Ayta ash Shab and Dhayra in the Bint Jbeil district. This was after numerous Palestinian militants infiltrated the Israeli border. The IDF killed at least two perpetrators (likely Palestinians), while a third returned to Lebanon.
- A Hezbollah media source announced that one of their members died in the IDF retaliation. Hezbollah denied involvement in the incident, and the Palestinian Islamic Jihad militia claimed responsibility for the armed infiltration. Hezbollah later announced the death of two other militants at night.
- Hezbollah fired rockets and artillery in retaliation. During the clashes, two Israeli soldiers and Lt. Col Alim Abdallah, Deputy Commander of the IDF's 300th Brigade, died of wounds inflicted by enemy fire on the border and another three were wounded.
- Three Israeli soldiers were killed in a confrontation with militants on the frontier with Lebanon on Monday, Israel's military has confirmed.

=== 10 October ===
- Hezbollah and the IDF exchanged fire, with Hezbollah firing a salvo of rockets into Israel and an attack on the security forces brought out by the Palestinian factions.
- Hezbollah fired an anti-tank guided missile at an Israeli military vehicle in the Avivim area, prompting a retaliatory Israeli helicopter strike.

=== 11 October ===
- Hezbollah fired anti-tank missiles at an Israeli military position and claimed to have produced casualties. In response, the IDF shelled the area where the attack was launched.
- The IDF ordered residents of northern Israel to seek shelter following reports of drones being launched from southern Lebanon.
- A Patriot missile was launched to intercept a suspicious projectile, after which the IDF found that the object in question was not a drone.
- Warning sirens were activated across northern Israel after reports emerged that up to 20 infiltrators on paragliders had entered Israeli territory from Lebanon, before the IDF dismissed the report as a false alarm.

=== 12 October ===
- The Israeli Defence Ministry announced that one soldier was killed and another injured by an anti-tank missile fired by Hezbollah.
- The Syrian Army conducted a mortar strike into the Golan Heights after IDF airstrikes on Aleppo and Damascus international airports.

=== 13 October ===
- Hezbollah deputy chief Sheikh Naim Qassem said that 'when time comes for any action, we will carry it out' stating that Hezbollah was ready and 'would "contribute" to confrontations against Israel according to its own plan'.
- The IDF fired artillery into southern Lebanon following an explosion that caused minor damage to a section of the Israel–Lebanon border wall near Kibbutz Hanita.
- Lebanese Reuters video journalist, Issam Abdallah, was killed, while at least six other journalists from Reuters, AFP and Al Jazeera were injured. The Lebanese Army said that two others were injured during the strike.

=== 14 October ===
- The IDF released footage of a drone attack which, according to them, killed three infiltrators from Lebanon near Margaliot who were members of Hamas. One of them was acknowledged by Hezbollah as one of their members.
- In the afternoon, Hezbollah fired 50 mortar shells and six anti-tank missiles towards five Israeli outposts in the Shebaa Farms.
- Further IDF shelling killed two civilians in a Shebaa village; video and photographic evidence showed usage of phosphorus bombs.

=== 15 October ===
- Hezbollah launched five anti-tank missiles towards northern Israel killing one civilian and injuring three others in Shtula.
- UNIFIL said that their headquarters in Naqoura in southern Lebanon was hit by rocket fire with no casualties reported.
- Lieutenant Amitai Granot, commander of the 75th Battalion of the IDF's Golan Brigade and son of Rabbi Tamir Granot, was killed in a missile attack on an IDF post bordering Lebanon.

=== 16 October ===
- The IDF announced the evacuation of residents of settlements two kilometers away from the Lebanese border.
- In the afternoon, shots were fired towards IDF positions near the border which Hezbollah claimed responsibility for. The IDF responded with artillery fire. Hezbollah said that it had started destroying surveillance cameras on several Israeli Army posts.
- In the evening, anti-tank missiles were fired at an IDF tank and gunshots were aimed towards multiple army positions. The IDF attacked the sources of the fire with artillery. There were no reported casualties in either exchanges on that day.
- Amnesty International reported that the IDF fired white phosphorus shells into Dhayra, hospitalizing nine civilians and setting fire to civilian objects. Aya Majzoub, the Deputy Regional Director for the Middle East and North Africa at Amnesty International, described the attack as a violation of international law that needed to be investigated as a war crime, and that it "seriously endangered the lives of civilians, many of whom were hospitalized and displaced, and whose homes and cars caught fire".

=== 17 October ===
- Lebanese state media reported that Dhayra and other areas along the western section of the border came under "continuous" bombardment overnight.
- In the early morning it was reported that multiple people were suffering from symptoms of suffocation after the IDF allegedly fired white phosphorus shells on the village. Three people were injured after an anti-tank missile from Lebanon landed in the Israeli town of Metula.
- The IDF said it had killed four would-be infiltrators along the Lebanese border as they attempted to plant bombs on the border wall. Hezbollah announced that five of its members were killed that day but it was unclear if any had involvement in the border infiltration.

=== 18 October ===
- After the Al-Ahli Arab Hospital explosion, pro-Palestinian protestors took part in riots in the towns of Dbayeh and Aoukar. Businesses were vandalized and torched.
- Hezbollah announced the targeting of Al-Raheb, Ramia, Jal Al-Alam, Zarit barracks, and the Bahri site located opposite Ras Al-Naqoura, Al-Tahayat Hill, Al-Matla, Ruwaisat Al-Alam, Shebaa Farms, Kafr Shuba Hills, Al-Tahayat, and Al-Makiyah with guided missiles. The IDF responded by bombing the outskirts of the towns of Alma Al-Shaab, Al-Dhahira, Ramia, Al-Mari, Kafr Shuba, and the towns of Rmeish, Aitaroun, Mays Al-Jabal, and Hula. Hezbollah then announced that three of its fighters were killed as a result of the attacks.

=== 19 October ===
- Dozens of rockets were fired at the northern Israeli cities of Nahariya and Kiryat Shmona from southern Lebanon, injuring at least three civilians. Hamas said its cells in Lebanon were responsible for the attacks. Israel responded with airstrikes on Hezbollah positions.
- The Lebanese army said that one was killed and another injured after a group of seven Iranian journalists were targeted with machine guns by Israel, although Iranian state media denied the claim and said that all its journalists were "alive and healthy".
- UNIFIL peacekeepers said that one person was killed after civilians were caught in a cross-fire at the border in which the Lebanese Army requested assistance by UNIFIL to deescalate the situation. It was requested to Israel to suspend fire "to facilitate the rescue operation".

=== 20 October ===
- At noon, the IDF said that one of their aircraft killed three Hezbollah militants who infiltrated the border into northern Israel.
- In the afternoon several projectile launches were carried out from Lebanon towards northern Israel, the IDF responded with artillery fire at the sources of the attacks. The IDF announced that an Israeli-American reserve soldier was killed and three others were wounded.

=== 21 October ===
- In the early afternoon, a number of rockets were fired from Lebanon toward the Shebaa Farms; there were no injuries.
- The IDF conducted a drone strike on the team of militants that launched the rockets.
- A short while later, anti-tank guided missiles were fired from Lebanon toward Margaliot and Hanita; two foreign workers were injured. The IDF conducted airstrikes against the missile teams.
- In the evening, another anti-tank guided missile was fired from Lebanon toward Bar'am. One IDF soldier was seriously injured and two others were lightly injured. The IDF responded with several airstrikes in southern Lebanon, some of which targeted other missile teams preparing attacks.

=== 22 October ===
- The IDF said an anti-tank guided missile was fired from Lebanon toward the Shebaa Farms in the late morning. The IDF responded with tank fire and killed the missile team.
- In the early afternoon, several mortars were fired toward Yiftah; no damage or casualties were reported. In the evening, an anti-tank guided missile was fired toward Arab al-Aramshe; the IDF responded with continued airstrikes against missile launching teams. Seven teams in total were struck over the course of the day.

=== 23 October ===
- After a day of IDF strikes against Hezbollah missile teams, in the evening an anti-tank guided missile was fired toward Kiryat Shmona. Two were injured, and a house was damaged. The IDF responded with continued airstrikes against missile and rocket teams, along with strikes against Hezbollah border posts.

=== 24 October ===
- The IDF said a Hezbollah member was killed as he tried to fire at Israel from southern Lebanon near Bar'am.
- The IDF conducted airstrikes against two Syrian military positions in southwestern Syria, marking the first time the IDF publicly targeted the Syrian military since the Israel-Gaza war began.

=== 25 October ===
- In the morning, the IDF attacked a group of militants trying to fire anti-tank missiles from Lebanon into Israel.
- At around 16:00, four rockets were launched towards Israeli territory, which fell in open areas.
- IDF warplanes bombed the outskirts of the villages of Kafr Kila, Yaroun and Deir Mimas.

=== 26 October ===
- The IDF announced that it had eliminated five Hezbollah cells in south Lebanon. It later fired two artillery shells in the outskirts of Blida and Ayta ash Shab with phosphorus bombs.
- Phosphorus bombs caused fires in Ayta ash Shab, Deir Mimas, Aalma ech Chaab, Rmaich, Dhaira, Shebaa, Yaroun, Kfarchouba, Naqoura and Marwahin. The IDF reportedly prevented firefighters from reaching the fires.

=== 27 October ===
- The IDF attacked the sources of rocket fire after militants fired towards IDF posts in the villages of Avivim and Misgav Am.
- A Lebanese Army convoy came under fire from Israeli forces in the border village of Aitaroun, but no casualties were reported.
- About 600 families from the border region have fled to Sahel Al-Zahrani and were scattered across 18 villages.

=== 28 October ===
- A shell hit the UNIFIL headquarters in Naqoura. Hours later two mortar shells hit a UNIFIL base in Hula, injuring a Nepalese peacekeeper.

=== 29 October ===
- The Al-Qassam Brigades reportedly launched 16 rockets at Kiryat Shmona, hitting a residential building. The Fajr Forces, the military wing of the Islamic Group claimed responsibility for missiles fired at the town.

=== 30 October ===
- PIJ militants attempted to infiltrate IDF positions on the Lebanon border, resulting in the death of two militants.

=== 31 October ===
- Amnesty International said they had found that the IDF "indiscriminately, and therefore unlawfully, used white phosphorus munitions" in an attack on Dhayra which "must be investigated as a war crime".
- Hezbollah conducted four attacks on IDF positions in northern Israel.

== November ==
=== 1 November ===
- Hezbollah conducted multiple anti-tank guided missile attacks on Yiftah.

=== 2 November ===
- Hezbollah claimed to have attacked 19 IDF military sites with missiles and artillery shells and fired one-way attack drones at an IDF position for the first time since the conflict began.
- The Al-Qassam brigades fired rockets at Kiryat Shmona.

=== 3 November ===
- In his first speech since the start of the war in Gaza, Hezbollah leader Hassan Nasrallah said the presence of US warships in the Mediterranean "doesn't scare us".

=== 4 November ===
- Hezbollah attacked several IDF posts including one in Jal al-Allam with two Burkan ground launched missiles.

=== 5 November ===
- Hezbollah shot down an Israeli Elbit Hermes 450 drone over Nabatieh, with wreckage falling over houses in the towns of Zabdin and Harouf.
- One Israeli civilian was killed when anti-tank missiles hit Yiftah.
- Four people were reportedly injured after an Israeli bombing that hit two ambulances.
- Later, an Israeli airstrike hit two civilian cars in Lebanon carrying members of the same family driving between the towns of Aynata and Aitaroun which killed one woman, three of her granddaughters between the ages of 10 and 14, and severely injured her daughter. In response, Hezbollah fired at Kiryat Shmona, killing an Israeli civilian.

=== 6 November ===
- The Al-Qassam Brigades took responsibility for firing 16 rockets from Lebanon targeting areas south of Haifa.
- Israel reported at least 30 rockets being fired in which the IDF fired back at the sources. Hezbollah and the Al-Qassam brigades also conducted four cross-border attacks into northern Israel.
- Hezbollah deputy general Naim Qassem said that the group could be forced into wider conflict over Israeli attacks in Gaza.

=== 7 November ===
- Unspecified militants fired a salvo of 20 rockets from southern Lebanon towards the Golan Heights.

=== 8 November ===
- Hezbollah fired an anti-tank guided missile which injured two IDF soldiers near Dovev in northern Israel.

=== 9 November ===
- Hezbollah and other militia fighters conducted three cross-border attacks into northern Israel. They also launched attacks towards Metula in which the IDF responded with missile attacks hitting the launch sites.

=== 10 November ===
- Hezbollah launched anti-tank missiles into an IDF post in Manara which injured three soldiers. The IDF attacked the sources of fire in response.
- Hezbollah conducted three drone attacks into northern Israel targeting IDF positions and civilians. One drone was intercepted while two others landed on Israeli territory. Seven Hezbollah members were killed during the clashes.
- The IDF shelled Meiss Ej Jabal Hospital, injuring a doctor. The Lebanese health ministry condemned the attack, saying that "Israeli authorities were fully responsible for this unjustifiable act, which would have led to catastrophic results", and called for an investigation.

=== 11 November ===
- An IDF drone struck a pick-up truck on a farmland in the Zahrani area 45 kilometers from the Israeli-Lebanese border.
- Hezbollah said that it carried out two cross-border attacks on Israeli posts which caused casualties.
- The IDF fired towards sources of three drone attacks from Lebanon.
- The Amal Movement, an ally of Hezbollah, announced that a fighter was killed in a missile attack in the village of Rab El Thalathine which also wounded two other members. These were the first casualties from the group since it joined the fighting.

=== 12 November ===
- Hezbollah anti-tank missile and mortar attacks killed an employee of the Israel Electric Corporation who was conducting repair work and injured 21 other Israelis, including seven IDF soldiers and six of the fatality's colleagues.
- Hezbollah also claimed to have struck an IDF bulldozer in a separate attack. The IDF said it had launched a drone strike at a militant cell that tried to launch antitank missiles near Metula. Further clashes also killed one Hezbollah member.
- A UNIFIL peacekeeper was injured in unknown circumstances by gunfire near al-Qawzah.
- The al-Qassam brigades claimed two separate attacks on Israeli towns north of Haifa.

=== 13 November ===
- Following a Hezbollah strike, the IDF responded with heavy shelling across southern Lebanon which reportedly killed two civilians.
- Unidentified fighters fired anti-tank guided missiles that injured two Israelis near Netu'a.
- An Israeli rocket struck near journalists in Yaroun, no casualties were reported. Hezbollah condemned the attack, which happened while the journalists were on a public tour in the town. Foreign minister Abdallah Bou Habib said that the Lebanese government filed a complaint with the UN Security Council in response to the incident.

=== 14 November ===
- Missiles from Lebanon landed on open areas in the Israeli towns of Shtula, Shomera and Zar'it. Hezbollah also launched three anti-tank missiles at IDF positions.
- Fighter jets fired at Hezbollah positions in southern Lebanon and an IDF tank attacked a squad that tried to launch anti-tank missiles into the Yiftah area.

=== 15 November ===
- Hezbollah fired an ATGM that it hit a group of IDF soldiers near Birkat Risha.

=== 16 November ===
- Hezbollah conducted eight anti-tank missiles targeting Israeli forces and military infrastructure.
- In the afternoon, Hezbollah attacked numerous towns near the border and targeted military gatherings in Shtula and Hadab Yaron. The IDF responded heavily in southern Lebanon and Israeli warplanes raided Hezbollah targets.
- Hezbollah announced that two of its members were killed that day.

=== 17 November ===
- Hezbollah fired towards military outposts in northern Israel in which the IDF responded with attacks on the sources of Hezbollah fire.
- According to Syrian opposition forces, the IDF fired towards Hezbollah posts in Syria.
- Hezbollah used a quadcopter drone to attack IDF forces near Metula.

=== 18 November ===
- An aluminum factory was struck by the IDF in Nabatieh.
- Hezbollah fired a surface-to-air drone at an Israeli Hermes 450 destroying it and fired a Burkan missile into northern Israel.

=== 19 November ===
- The IDF identified 10 mortar shells launched towards the area of Shlomi in northern Israel which hit open areas. The IDF responded with shelling on Hezbollah targets with tanks and fighter jets and hit a cell.

=== 20 November ===
- The IDF base of Biranit suffered heavy damage from a Hezbollah barrage using Burkan rockets.
- IDF fighter jets struck numerous Hezbollah military targets, and soldiers struck a militant cell near Metula.
- The historically significant St. George church was heavily damaged in Yaroun after it was shelled by the IDF.
- The house of Amal Movement MP Kabalan Kabalan was also hit with rocket fire.

=== 21 November ===
- An IDF airstrike in Kafr Kila killed an elderly woman and injured her granddaughter.
- Another team of journalists were shelled in an IDF strike near Tayr Harfa which killed three people, including two Al Mayadeen journalists, a reporter and a photojournalist, and a guide.
- Four members of the Al-Qassam Brigades were killed after an IDF strike on a car near Chaaitiyeh.
- A Hezbollah member was also killed in a separate attack in Khiam.
- Unspecified fighters launched a one-way attack drone targeting IDF forces along the border.

=== 22 November ===
- Sirens were set off after the communities of Netu'a, Zar'it, and Yiftah were targeted by rockets fired from Lebanon. The IDF responded by shelling the sources of the fire. Israeli tanks also shelled a Hezbollah outpost in southern Lebanon.
- Hezbollah conducted two attacks on Malkia. Unspecified fighters fired rockets from Syria toward the occupied Golan Heights.
- Hezbollah told Al Jazeera that it will "respect" the temporary ceasefire deal between Israel and Hamas.
- The IDF struck the village of Beit Yahoun, killing five Hezbollah members. Amongst those killed was Abbas Raad, the son of senior Hezbollah leader and MP Mohammad Raad.

=== 23 November ===
- In one of the largest Hezbollah barrages since the start of the fighting, between 30 and 50 rockets were fired from Lebanon at Israel's Upper Galilee, a number of which were intercepted.
