= Deir Siryan =

Deir Siryan دير سريان
- Municipality
- Location within Lebanon
- Coordinates: 33°17′27″N 35°30′23″E
- Grid position: L 128/150
- Country: Lebanon
- Governorate: Nabatieh Governorate
- District: Marjayoun District
- Elevation: 525 m (1,722 ft)
- Time zone: UTC+2 (EET)
  - Summer (DST): UTC+3 (EEST)
- Dialing code: +961

Deir Siryan or Deir Seryan (Arabic: دير سريان) is a municipality in the Marjayoun District in Southern Lebanon. By April 2026 it had largely been destroyed by Israeli demolition teams in the 2026 Lebanon War.

== Etymology ==
According to E. H. Palmer, the name Deir es Suriân means "the convent of the Syrian".

== History ==
In 1596, it was named as a village, Dayr Siryan, in the Ottoman nahiya (subdistrict) of Tibnin under the liwa' (district) of Safad, with a population of 10 households and 1 bachelor, all Muslim. The villagers paid a fixed tax-rate of 25% on agricultural products, such as wheat, barley, olive trees, goats, beehives, in addition to "occasional revenues" and a press for olive oil or grape syrup; a total of 2,952 akçe.

In the early 1860s, Ernest Renan found here remains of old buildings and a cistern. In 1875, Victor Guérin found that the village had Metawileh inhabitants, and noted: "Cisterns and tanks partly cut in the rock and partly built. Hewn stones show that here was an ancient village or edifice."

In 1881, the PEF's Survey of Western Palestine (SWP) described it as "a village, built of stone, containing about 200 Metawileh, situated on the plain and surrounded by small gardens and arable land. Water from wells and a spring."

=== 2026 Lebanon War ===
In March 2026, the village was targeted by the Israel Defense Forces during clashes with Hezbollah and destruction of their weaponry and infrastructure during the 2026 Lebanon War.

The villagers had mostly fled or were expelled when Deir Siryan was destroyed by Israeli demolition experts in April 2026 through a series of controlled explosions. The purpose of these actions was to establish a so-called "security zone" along the border by preventing enemy fighters from using buildings in the area for their operations. Other border villages in Lebanon who were reported to have been largely destroyed by IDF sappers were neighboring Taybeh and An-Naqoura.

== Demographics ==
In 2014 Muslims made up 99.84% of registered voters in Deir Siryan. 98.77% of the voters were Shiite Muslims.

== Bibliography ==
- Conder, C.R.; Kitchener, H.H. (1881). The Survey of Western Palestine: Memoirs of the Topography, Orography, Hydrography, and Archaeology. Vol. 1. London: Committee of the Palestine Exploration Fund.
- Guérin, V. (1880). Description Géographique Historique et Archéologique de la Palestine (in French). Vol. 3: Galilee, pt. 2. Paris: L'Imprimerie Nationale.
- Hütteroth, W.-D.; Abdulfattah, K. (1977). Historical Geography of Palestine, Transjordan and Southern Syria in the Late 16th Century. Erlanger Geographische Arbeiten, Sonderband 5. Erlangen, Germany: Vorstand der Fränkischen Geographischen Gesellschaft. ISBN 3-920405-41-2.
- Palmer, E.H. (1881). The Survey of Western Palestine: Arabic and English Name Lists Collected During the Survey by Lieutenants Conder and Kitchener, R. E. Transliterated and Explained by E.H. Palmer. Committee of the Palestine Exploration Fund.
- Renan, E. (1864). Mission de Phénicie (in French). Paris: Imprimerie impériale.
- Rhode, H. (1979). Administration and Population of the Sancak of Safed in the Sixteenth Century. Columbia University. Archived from the original on 2020-03-01.
