= Halta =

Halta حلتا
- Village
- Location within Lebanon
- Coordinates: 33°18′31″N 35°40′08″E
- Country: Lebanon
- Governorate: Nabatieh Governorate
- District: Hasbaya District
- Time zone: UTC+2 (EET)
  - Summer (DST): UTC+3 (EEST)
- Dialing code: +961

Halta (Arabic: حلتا) is a small village in the far south-east of Lebanon, near the border with the Golan Heights. The village has a mosque and an elementary school. Halta was

== Demographics ==
Halta is divided into two parts: Upper and Lower Halta. The village has a population of almost 350 people.

== Economy ==
Halta is related to the village of Kfarchouba (in the district of Hasbaya) and is famous for agriculture and grazing.

== Recreation ==
Halta is a popular destination for many of the statesmen and expatriates for the practice of hunting and during fishing seasons.

== Climate ==
The climate is a little hot in summer and warm in winter.
