= Shihin, Lebanon =

Shihin شيحين
- Municipality
- Location within Lebanon
- Coordinates: 33°07′34″N 35°15′22″E
- Grid position: 174/281 PAL
- Country: Lebanon
- Governorate: South Governorate
- District: Tyre District
- Elevation: 480 m (1,570 ft)
- Time zone: UTC+2 (EET)
  - Summer (DST): UTC+3 (EEST)
- Dialing code: +9617

Shihin (Arabic: شيحين, romanized: Shīḥīn) is a municipality in Southern Lebanon, located in Tyre District, Governorate of South Lebanon.

== Etymology ==
According to E. H. Palmer, the name comes from a personal name.

== History ==
In 1875 Victor Guérin found here 200 Metawileh inhabitants. He also noted: "that the hill on which the village stands is surrounded by an enclosure constructed of great blocks regularly cut and of varying dimensions. Here and there are standing, unbroken, pieces of this thick wall. On the highest point of the hill may be remarked the remains of a fortress built with stones of the same dressing, the interior of which has been transformed into private houses, themselves half demolished. Near here, the site of an ancient tower is still to be made out. Here are also broken sarcophagi, cisterns, a press cut in the rock, and a great basin to hold rainwater."

In 1881, the PEF's Survey of Western Palestine (SWP) described it: "A stone and mud village, containing 150 Metawileh, with traces of ruins [..], situated on ridge of hills, with figs, olives and arable land. Here is a large birket and twelve cisterns for water."

They further noted: "Some large well-dressed stones and foundations of ancient buildings; one column and broken sculptured stone; probably an ancient place of importance."

During Operation Accountability, July 1993, Shihin was one of the villages devastated by Israeli artillery. On 19 August, nineteen days after the ceasefire was established, eight Israeli soldiers were killed in a Hizbollah ambush close to the village.

== Demographics ==
In 2014 Muslims made up 99.80% of registered voters in Shihin. 98.32% of the voters were Shiite Muslims.

== Bibliography ==
- Conder, C.R.; Kitchener, H.H. (1881). The Survey of Western Palestine: Memoirs of the Topography, Orography, Hydrography, and Archaeology. Vol. 1. London: Committee of the Palestine Exploration Fund.
- Guérin, V. (1880). Description Géographique Historique et Archéologique de la Palestine (in French). Vol. 3: Galilee, pt. 2. Paris: L'Imprimerie Nationale.
- Palmer, E.H. (1881). The Survey of Western Palestine: Arabic and English Name Lists Collected During the Survey by Lieutenants Conder and Kitchener, R. E. Transliterated and Explained by E.H. Palmer. Committee of the Palestine Exploration Fund.
