= Al-Jibbain =

Al-Jibbain الجبين Jebbayn, Jebbine
- Location within Lebanon
- Coordinates: 33°7′23″N 35°14′1″E
- Grid position: 172/280 PAL
- Country: Lebanon
- Governorate: South Governorate
- District: Tyre District
- Elevation: 440 m (1,440 ft)
- Time zone: UTC+2 (EET)
  - Summer (DST): UTC+3 (EEST)

Al-Jibbain (Arabic: الجبين, romanized: al-Jibbayn) is a municipality in Southern Lebanon, located in Tyre District, Governorate of South Lebanon.

== Etymology ==
According to E. H. Palmer, the name means "the two pits".

== History ==
In 1596, it was named as a village, Jibin, in the Ottoman nahiya (subdistrict) of Tibnin under the liwa' (district) of Safad, with a population of 7 households, all Muslim. The villagers paid a fixed tax-rate of 25% on agricultural products, such as wheat, barley, olive trees, goats, beehives; in addition to occasional revenues and a press for olive oil or grape syrup; a total of 2,177 akçe.

In 1875, Victor Guérin noted here "a few Metawileh families", who inhabited an ancient locality.

In 1881, the PEF's Survey of Western Palestine (SWP) described it: "A small village, built of stone, containing about seventy Metawileh; it is situated on a hill, with figs, olives, and arable land around. There are three cisterns for water." They further noted a ruined, rock-cut birket.

=== Modern era ===
On August 3 or 4, 2006, during the 2006 Lebanon War, Israeli helicopter strikes killed 4 Hezbollah operatives in an uninhabited valley some 900 meters from Al-Jibbain. At the same time, they fired on the house nearest, killing 4 civilians, aged 42 to 81 years of age.

== Demographics ==
In 2014 Muslims made up 99.78% of registered voters in Al-Jibbain. 98.90% of the voters were Shiite Muslims.

== Bibliography ==
- Conder, C.R.; Kitchener, H.H. (1881). The Survey of Western Palestine: Memoirs of the Topography, Orography, Hydrography, and Archaeology. Vol. 1. London: Committee of the Palestine Exploration Fund.
- Guérin, V. (1880). Description Géographique Historique et Archéologique de la Palestine (in French). Vol. 3: Galilee, pt. 2. Paris: L'Imprimerie Nationale.
- HRW (2007). Why They Died: Civilian Casualties in Lebanon During the 2006 War. Human Rights Watch.
- Hütteroth, W.-D.; Abdulfattah, K. (1977). Historical Geography of Palestine, Transjordan and Southern Syria in the Late 16th Century. Erlanger Geographische Arbeiten, Sonderband 5. Erlangen, Germany: Vorstand der Fränkischen Geographischen Gesellschaft. ISBN 3-920405-41-2.
- Palmer, E.H. (1881). The Survey of Western Palestine: Arabic and English Name Lists Collected During the Survey by Lieutenants Conder and Kitchener, R. E. Transliterated and Explained by E.H. Palmer. Committee of the Palestine Exploration Fund.
- Rhode, H. (1979). Administration and Population of the Sancak of Safed in the Sixteenth Century. Columbia University. Archived from the original on 2019-04-20.
