= August 2024 Nabatieh attack =

2024 attack on Nabatieh, Lebanon

- Part of the Israel–Hezbollah war (2023–present)
- Location: Nabatieh, Lebanon
- Date: August 17, 2024
- Attack type: Airstrike
- Deaths: 11+ people
- Injuries: 4+ people
- Perpetrator: Israel Defense Forces

On August 17, 2024, Israel attacked a warehouse in Nabatieh in southern Lebanon, killing at least 11 people and injuring four others. All people killed in the attack were Syrian refugees.

== Background ==
Following the October 7, 2023 attack, Israel began bombing the Gaza Strip. In retaliation, Hezbollah began skirmishing with the Israel Defense Forces (IDF), in solidarity with the Palestinians. Hezbollah has stated that it will cease its attacks only when a ceasefire is reached in the ongoing Israel-Hamas conflict in Gaza.

== Attack ==
The strike, conducted by Israeli Air Force fighter jets, targeted an iron warehouse in an industrial zone in Wadi al-Kfour, Nabatieh, which includes various factories producing bricks, metal, and aluminium, as well as a dairy farm. The warehouse was also used to house Syrian refugees, who lived on the top floor. The warehouse and nearby buildings were destroyed as a result. According to the Lebanese Health Ministry, eleven people were killed, including a woman and her two children, and three Syrians, one Sudanese were wounded, two Syrians critically. The IDF claimed responsibility, stating that it targeted at a Hezbollah weapons storage facility located approximately 12 kilometers from the Israeli border. According to witnesses and local residents, the fatalities were Syrian refugees, including factory workers residing in nearby housing.

This strike was among the deadliest in Lebanon up until that point since the escalation between Hezbollah and the Israeli military, which began on 8 October 2023 following the start of the Israeli bombing campaign against Gaza. Hezbollah has stated that it will cease its attacks only when a ceasefire is reached in the ongoing Israel-Hamas conflict in Gaza.

== Reactions ==
The IDF's Arabic-language spokesperson, Avichay Adraee, reiterated that the target of the strike was a Hezbollah weapons depot, maintaining that military assets were present at the site. However, relatives of the victims denied these claims, insisting that there were no weapons at the location and that it was purely an industrial facility.

Hezbollah fired 55 rockets into the Upper Galilee in response to the attack, targeting Ayelet HaShahar, Safed, and other nearby communities. Two Israeli soldiers were injured near Misgav Am, while over ten fires broke out.

The Embassy of the Philippines, Beirut advised its 11,000 citizens in Lebanon to leave the country following the strike.

== See also ==
- Majdal Shams attack
- Quneitra Governorate clashes (2024)
