= Blida, Lebanon =

Blida بليدا
- Municipality
- Location within Lebanon
- Coordinates: 33°08′24″N 35°30′55″E
- Grid position: 198/282 PAL
- Country: Lebanon
- Governorate: Nabatieh Governorate
- District: Marjayoun District
- Elevation: 701 m (2,300 ft)
- Time zone: UTC+2 (EET)
  - Summer (DST): UTC+3 (EEST)
- Dialing code: +961

Blida (Arabic: بليدا, romanized: Blīdā) is a municipality in Marjayoun District in southern Lebanon.

== Location ==
The municipality of Blida is located in the Kaza of Marjayoun one of is one of the eight mohafazats (governorates) of Lebanon. Blida is 118 kilometers (73.3252 mi) away from Beirut, the capital of Lebanon. Its elevation is 630 meters (2067.03 ft – 688.968 yd) above sea level. Blida surface stretches for 1330 hectares (13.3 km² – 5.1338 mi²).

== Name ==
E. H. Palmer wrote that the name Belidet meant "The little village".

== History ==
In 1881, the PEF's Survey of Western Palestine (SWP) described it as: "A village, built of stone, containing [a] mosque, and having about 150 Moslem inhabitants, situated on a ridge, with figs, olives, and arable land. One cistern and a good spring one mile south-east of the village give the water supply."

They further noted: "Here are several columns and remains of ruins. Double triangles are cut on either side of [the] door of [the] mosque."

== Demographics ==
In 2014 Muslims made up 99.68% of registered voters in Blida. 98.55% of the voters were Shiite Muslims.

== Educational establishments ==
Educational establishments	Blida (2005–2006)	Lebanon (2005–2006)
Number of Schools	2	2,788
Public School	2	1,763
Private School	0	1,025
Students schooled in the public schools	200	439,905
Students schooled in the private schools	Not available	471,409

== Bibliography ==
- "L'armée israélienne rase un cimetière à Blida, détruit une école et fait sauter des maisons à Meis el-Jabal et Ramiyé", L'Orient le Jour, 20 octobre 2024.
- Conder, C.R.; Kitchener, H.H. (1881). The Survey of Western Palestine: Memoirs of the Topography, Orography, Hydrography, and Archaeology. Vol. 1. London: Committee of the Palestine Exploration Fund.
- Palmer, E.H. (1881). The Survey of Western Palestine: Arabic and English Name Lists Collected During the Survey by Lieutenants Conder and Kitchener, R. E. Transliterated and Explained by E.H. Palmer. Committee of the Palestine Exploration Fund.
