= Aitaroun =

Aitaroun عيترون
- Municipality
- Location within Lebanon
- Coordinates: 33°06′59″N 35°28′6″E
- Grid position: 194/279 PAL
- Country: Lebanon
- Governorate: Nabatieh Governorate
- District: Bint Jbeil District
- Elevation: 630 m (2,070 ft)
- Time zone: UTC+2 (EET)
  - Summer (DST): UTC+3 (EEST)
- Dialing code: +961

Aitaroun (or Aytaroun; Arabic: عيترون, romanized: ʿAytarūn) is a municipality in southern Lebanon. It is on the northern border of Israel, and 125 km from Beirut. The majority of its population are Shiite Muslims.

== Etymology ==
The village's name origin is Itruma, which means; "The Beautiful Smell".

== History ==
=== Ottoman era ===
In 1596, it was named as a village, ’Aytarun in the Ottoman nahiya (subdistrict) of Tibnin under the liwa' (district) of Safed, with a population of 91 households and 15 bachelors, all Muslim. The villagers paid taxes on agricultural products, such as wheat, barley, goats, and beehives, in addition to "occasional revenues” and a fixed sum; a total of 14,570 akçe.

Visiting in 1875, Victor Guérin described it as a village with 200 Metualis.

In 1881, the PEF's Survey of Western Palestine (SWP) described it: "A large village, built of stone, containing 400 Moslems, situated in bed of wady, with olives, gardens and arable land. Water from a large birket and cisterns."

=== Israeli occupation ===
In 1982 the Israeli invasion of Lebanon began. Until 2000, the Israeli army occupied southern Lebanon.

=== 2006 Lebanon War ===
During the 2006 Lebanon War, Israel attacked Aitaroun several times. On July 16, 12 civilians from the Akhrass family, including 7 Canadian nationals, were killed when their home were destroyed in Israeli airstrikes. On July 18, 9 civilians from the Awada family were killed after Israeli air-strikes against their homes. Surviving family members reported that Hezbollah fighters had been launching rockets from a location within the village, approximately 100 to 150 meters from their house. In general, however, Hezbollah did not place military facilities in built up areas, and instead located its bunkers in fields and valleys away from villages.

On July 19, Israel killed 6 and wounded 8 civilians as they were trying to leave Aitaroun. The IDF had considered such movement suspicious, as it claimed that "all Lebanese civilians had observed its warnings to evacuate villages south of the Litani river" and thus there was "no need to discriminate between military objectives and civilians".

After the war, Israeli deputy ambassador to the UN, Daniel Carmon, justified attacks on civilians by stating "there is hardly any distinction between Hezbollah and the civilian population [in southern Lebanon]. This whole region was a region in which you could not make a distinction between the one and the other".

The village lost 41 villagers to the war new figures said. Families laid flowers and read Quranic verses at the graves on October 23, 2006, which marks the Eid ul-Fitr-holiday.

=== 2023–2024 conflict ===
During the 2023-2024 Israel Hezbollah conflict, Israel frequently attacked Shia-majority towns like Aitaroun via airstrikes and artillery barrages, reducing many of its communities to rubble. In December 2023, the Israeli army attacked a residential neighborhood, injuring 4 people and causing significant damage to buildings.

On February 28, 2025, 95 people from the village, including at least 51 Hezbollah fighters, were buried in a mass funeral. Among the 95 buried were 13 who died from natural causes while being displaced, 10 civil defense rescuers and 5 children, including a 10-month old girl killed in the October 2024 Aitou airstrike, which killed 23 people, all of whom were from Aitaroun.

In total, the village lost 118 of its residents over the course of the war.

== Demographics ==
In 2014 Muslims made up 99.57% of registered voters in Aitaroun. 98.72% of the voters were Shiite Muslims.

Aitaroun had a total population estimated at 20,000 in 2002. However, the actual number of residents is now considered to be significantly higher. The non-resident population is divided between emigrants and internal migrants distributed throughout Lebanon. Approximately 45% of the population is under the age of 30 and the average family size is 6-7 members.

== Economy ==
Most families depend on agriculture as their primary source of income. During 1978 to 2000, the village received a significant cash flow from enlistment in the Israeli funded South Lebanon Army and through work in Israel.

== Housing and infrastructure ==
There are around 1,300 homes in the village. An electrical network was established in 1964 and access to telecommunications is fully restored since 2006. In 2005 a telephone exchange was installed in the village offering connectivity to Lebanon's telephone network. Mobile communications and internet connectivity were also fully restored.

During the occupation, potable water in the village was provided by water wells drilled in the village by Israel. The main water source is the collection of rain water which is stored in both private and public reservoirs.

== Government and social services ==
There are five schools operating in Aitaroun: two public and three private. Public schools, elementary and intermediate, encompass 250 students, with a higher percentage of girls especially for the intermediate level. The total number of students in the private schools amount to 570 distributed among one elementary school and two intermediate schools. The village has one health center operated by the Ministry of Social Affairs. The municipal council in the village was established in 1961.

== Flora ==
The area is rich in wild herbs, flowers and mushrooms. Particularly prevalent are the red poppy flower, wild capers and thistles. Other flora that are believed to be more agricultural or introduced, include; grape vines, pomegranate trees, figs, cactus apple, sumac, various wild berries.

== Bibliography ==
- Conder, C.R.; Kitchener, H.H. (1881). The Survey of Western Palestine: Memoirs of the Topography, Orography, Hydrography, and Archaeology. Vol. 1. London: Committee of the Palestine Exploration Fund.
- Guérin, V. (1880). Description Géographique Historique et Archéologique de la Palestine (in French). Vol. 3: Galilee, pt. 2. Paris: L'Imprimerie Nationale.
- HRW (2007). Why They Died: Civilian Casualties in Lebanon During the 2006 War. Human Rights Watch.
- Hütteroth, W.-D.; Abdulfattah, K. (1977). Historical Geography of Palestine, Transjordan and Southern Syria in the Late 16th Century. Erlanger Geographische Arbeiten, Sonderband 5. Erlangen, Germany: Vorstand der Fränkischen Geographischen Gesellschaft. ISBN 3-920405-41-2.
- Palmer, E.H. (1881). The Survey of Western Palestine: Arabic and English Name Lists Collected During the Survey by Lieutenants Conder and Kitchener, R. E. Transliterated and Explained by E.H. Palmer. Committee of the Palestine Exploration Fund.
- Rhode, H. (1979). Administration and Population of the Sancak of Safed in the Sixteenth Century. Columbia University. Archived from the original on 2020-03-01.
