= Rab Thalathin =

Rab Thalathin رب ثلاثين
- Municipality
- Location within Lebanon
- Coordinates: 33°14′56″N 35°31′8″E
- Grid position: 198/294 PAL
- Country: Lebanon
- Governorate: Nabatieh Governorate
- District: Marjayoun District
- Elevation: 620 m (2,030 ft)
- Time zone: UTC+2 (EET)
  - Summer (DST): UTC+3 (EEST)
- Dialing code: +961

Rab Thalathin (Arabic: رب ثلاثين, romanized: Rab Thalāthīn) is a municipality in the Marjayoun District in southern Lebanon.

== Etymology ==
According to E. H. Palmer, the name Rubb Thelâthin comes from rubb meaning syrup; and thelâthin meaning thirty.

== History ==
In 1875, Victor Guérin found it to be a village inhabited by Metawileh. He further remarked that the mosque was constructed out of parts from an old church.

In 1881, the PEF's Survey of Western Palestine (SWP) found here "several lintels and cisterns."

They further described it: "A small village, built of stone, containing about 100 Metawileh, situated on a hill-top, surrounded by figs and arable land; water supply from cisterns and spring near, and a small birket.

=== Modern era ===
During the 2006 Lebanon War, on the 10th of August, Israeli missiles killed five women in the village, aged from 31 to 82 years of age. According to Human Rights Watch there were no indications that Hezbollah fighters were present at the time of the strikes.

In October 2024 the IDF announced that it blew up a large underground complex at Rab Thalathin, said to have been in construction for a decade or more. The complex was capable of hosting 200 Hezbollah militants, and included computerized communications control rooms, supplies for months, ammunition on a battalion scale, RPGs, long-range anti-tank missiles, charges of various sizes, hundreds of rifles, and other tactical equipment. This was the largest ever engineered explosion by the IDF.

== Demographics ==
In 2014 Muslims made up 99.56% of registered voters in Rab Thalathin. 97.05% of the voters were Shiite Muslims.

== Bibliography ==
- Conder, C.R.; Kitchener, H.H. (1881). The Survey of Western Palestine: Memoirs of the Topography, Orography, Hydrography, and Archaeology. Vol. 1. London: Committee of the Palestine Exploration Fund.
- Guérin, V. (1880). Description Géographique Historique et Archéologique de la Palestine (in French). Vol. 3: Galilee, pt. 2. Paris: L'Imprimerie Nationale.
- HRW (2007). Why They Died: Civilian Casualties in Lebanon During the 2006 War. Human Rights Watch.
- Palmer, E.H. (1881). The Survey of Western Palestine: Arabic and English Name Lists Collected During the Survey by Lieutenants Conder and Kitchener, R. E. Transliterated and Explained by E.H. Palmer. Committee of the Palestine Exploration Fund.
