= Ayta ash-Shaab =

Municipality in Nabatieh Governorate, Lebanon

Ayta ash-Shaab عيتا الشعب
- Municipality
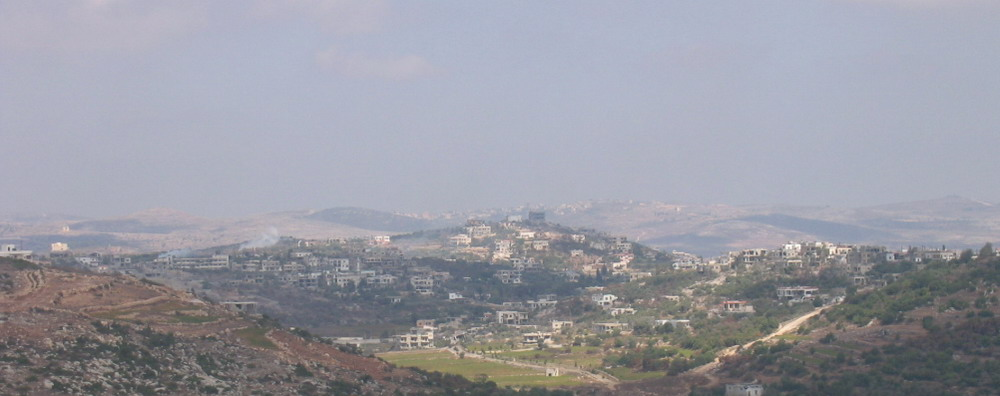
- Ayta ash Shab

- Location within Lebanon
- Coordinates: 33°05′50″N 35°20′04″E
- Grid position: 181/277 PAL
- Country: Lebanon
- Governorate: Nabatieh Governorate
- District: Bint Jbeil District
- Elevation: 650 m (2,130 ft)
- Time zone: UTC+2 (EET)
  - Summer (DST): UTC+3 (EEST)
- Dialing code: +961

Ayta ash-Shaab (Arabic: عيتا الشعب, romanized: ʿAytā ash-Shaʿb; also transliterated Ayta al-Sha'b or Ayta al-Shab) is a municipality located in southern Lebanon, about 2.22 km northeast of the Israeli border. The majority of its population are Shia Muslims.

== History ==
=== Antiquity ===
Ayta ash-Shaab is identified with Ayta (Hebrew: אייתה), a place referenced in the Baraita on the "Boundaries of the Land of Israel" as part of the delineation of the northwestern border of Jewish resettlement following the return from Babylonian exile.

=== Ottoman era ===
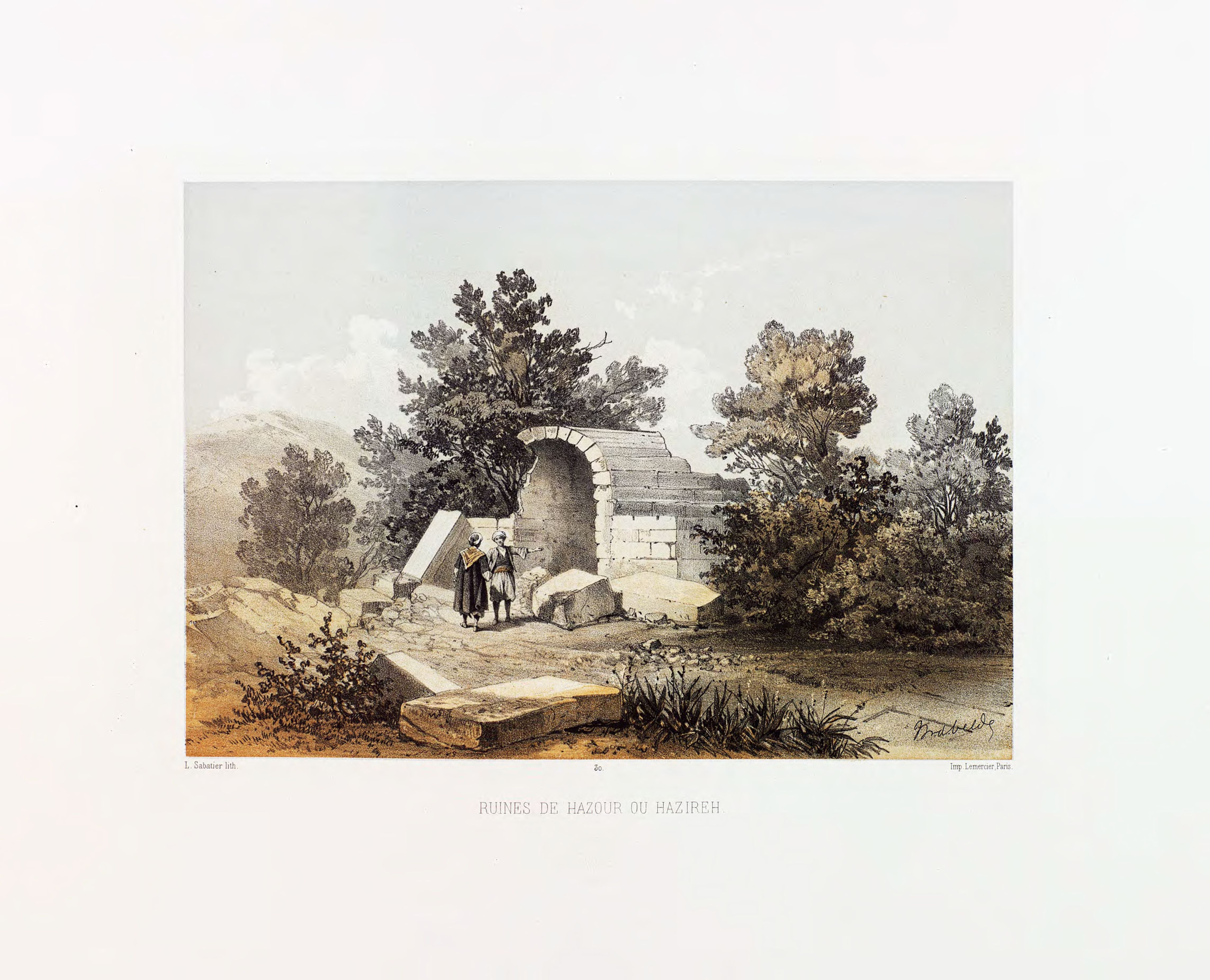
Ruines of Hazzirya, by C.W.M. Van De Velde, 1851

In 1596, it was named as a village, 'Ayta Bani Salman in the Ottoman nahiya (subdistrict) of Tibnin under the liwa' (district) of Safad, with a population of 5 Muslim households. The villagers paid a fixed tax of 25% on agricultural products, such as wheat, barley, goats and beehives, in addition to "occasional revenues"; a total of 930 akçe.

In 1875 Victor Guérin noted: "The village has taken the place of a small town surrounded by a wall, of which some remains still exist in well-cut stones and a fort measuring forty paces long by twenty-five broad. Beneath this building lies a large cistern vaulted with circular arches, and built of regularly cut stones. It is covered by a platform, on part of which has been built, later on, a little mosque, now falling into ruins. Here one may remark columns which come from an older building, the site of which is marked by a mass of blocks regularly cut, and by mutilated shafts lying upon the ground.
Below the village, the upper slopes of the hill are cultivated in terraces, and planted with vines, fig-trees, pomegranates, olives, and filberts. Here I found several cisterns, a great sepulchral cave, ornamented with arched arcosolia, each surmounting two sarcophagi, contiguous and parallel, a press with two compartments, one square and the other circular, the whole cut in the living rock.
Ascending towards the east, I passed beside an ancient pool half cut in the rock and half built. Not far is an old evergreen oak, one of the most remarkable that I have seen in Palestine, to which the inhabitants offer a kind of worship. It is protected by a little wall which supports the venerable trunk."

In 1881, the PEF's Survey of Western Palestine (SWP) described it: A well-built village of stone, situated on hill-top, with figs, olives, and arable land. It contains about 200 Moslems (Guerin says Metawileh), and has water from several cisterns and birket near. "Here are foundations of walls, built with well-dressed stones. Several sarcophagi were observed. On the east, south and west of village there are also two olive-presses and two rock-cut cisterns."

The ruins of Khirbet Hazireh (Hazzirya) are located 2 km northeast of Ayta ash-Shaab, described by C.W.M. Van De Velde in 1851.

=== Modern era ===
During the 2006 Lebanon War, 85% of Ayta ash-Shaab's homes were destroyed, and heavy ground fighting ensued between Israeli forces and Hezbollah.

On 20 July 2006, one civilian in the village was killed, and the next day three more civilian villagers were killed, all by Israeli fire. The victims were reported by the Human Rights Watch as having no relation to Hezbollah.

During the Israel–Hezbollah conflict, Hezbollah members used the village to fire missiles and coordinate attacks against Israel. Israel launched numerous airstrikes in the village in response. Almost all residents of the village have left, while frequent Israeli airstrikes and artillery barrages have reduced it to rubble, as it also happened in most nearby communities, while others, such as the Christian-inhabited town of Marjayoun, have been spared.

On 1 October 2024, the IDF claimed that since the onset of the Israel–Hezbollah conflict in October 2023 and leading up to the October 2024 ground operation, it had destroyed 103 militant targets in Ayta ash-Shaab, including 51 tunnel shafts and nine rocket launchers, with tunnels reaching approximately 25 meters deep. As of October 25th more than 80% of the village has been destroyed.

During the first two weeks of April 2026, more than 460 buildings in Ayta ash-Shaab were destroyed by Israel during its occupation of southern Lebanon.

== Demographics ==
In 2014 Muslims made up 99.64% of registered voters in Ayta ash-Shaab. 98.37% of the voters were Shiite Muslims.

== Bibliography ==
- Conder, C.R.; Kitchener, H.H. (1881). The Survey of Western Palestine: Memoirs of the Topography, Orography, Hydrography, and Archaeology. Vol. 1. London: Committee of the Palestine Exploration Fund.
- Guérin, V. (1880). Description Géographique Historique et Archéologique de la Palestine (in French). Vol. 3: Galilee, pt. 2. Paris: L'Imprimerie Nationale.
- HRW (2007). Why They Died: Civilian Casualties in Lebanon During the 2006 War. Human Rights Watch.
- Hütteroth, W.-D.; Abdulfattah, K. (1977). Historical Geography of Palestine, Transjordan and Southern Syria in the Late 16th Century. Erlanger Geographische Arbeiten, Sonderband 5. Erlangen, Germany: Vorstand der Fränkischen Geographischen Gesellschaft. ISBN 3-920405-41-2.
- Palmer, E.H. (1881). The Survey of Western Palestine: Arabic and English Name Lists Collected During the Survey by Lieutenants Conder and Kitchener, R. E. Transliterated and Explained by E.H. Palmer. Committee of the Palestine Exploration Fund.
- Rhode, H. (1979). Administration and Population of the Sancak of Safed in the Sixteenth Century. Columbia University. Archived from the original on 2019-04-20.
