= An-Naqoura =

Municipality in South Governorate, Lebanon

An-Naqoura الناقورة
- Municipality
- Location within Lebanon
- Coordinates: 33°07′6″N 35°08′24″E
- Grid position: 163/281 PAL
- Country: Lebanon
- Governorate: South Governorate
- District: Tyre District
- Highest elevation: 60 m (200 ft)

Population (2010)
  - Total: 4,150
- Time zone: +2
  - Summer (DST): +3
- Website: http://www.alnaqoura.com/

An-Naqoura (Arabic: الناقورة, romanized: an-Nāqūrah, also Enn Nâqoura, Naqoura) is a municipality in southern Lebanon. Since March 23, 1978, the United Nations Interim Force in Lebanon (UNIFIL) has been headquartered in An-Naqoura.

== Etymology ==
According to E. H. Palmer (1881), the name means "the horn" or "the trumpet". This name rises from a misconception on the part of the Arab-speaking inhabitants, as the name, [..] Tyre means in Arabic a horn or trumpet; therefore Ras Sur (the headland or ladder of Tyre') is rendered by Nakura, the synonym for Sur. The word is also connected with [..] to peck or perforate."

== History ==
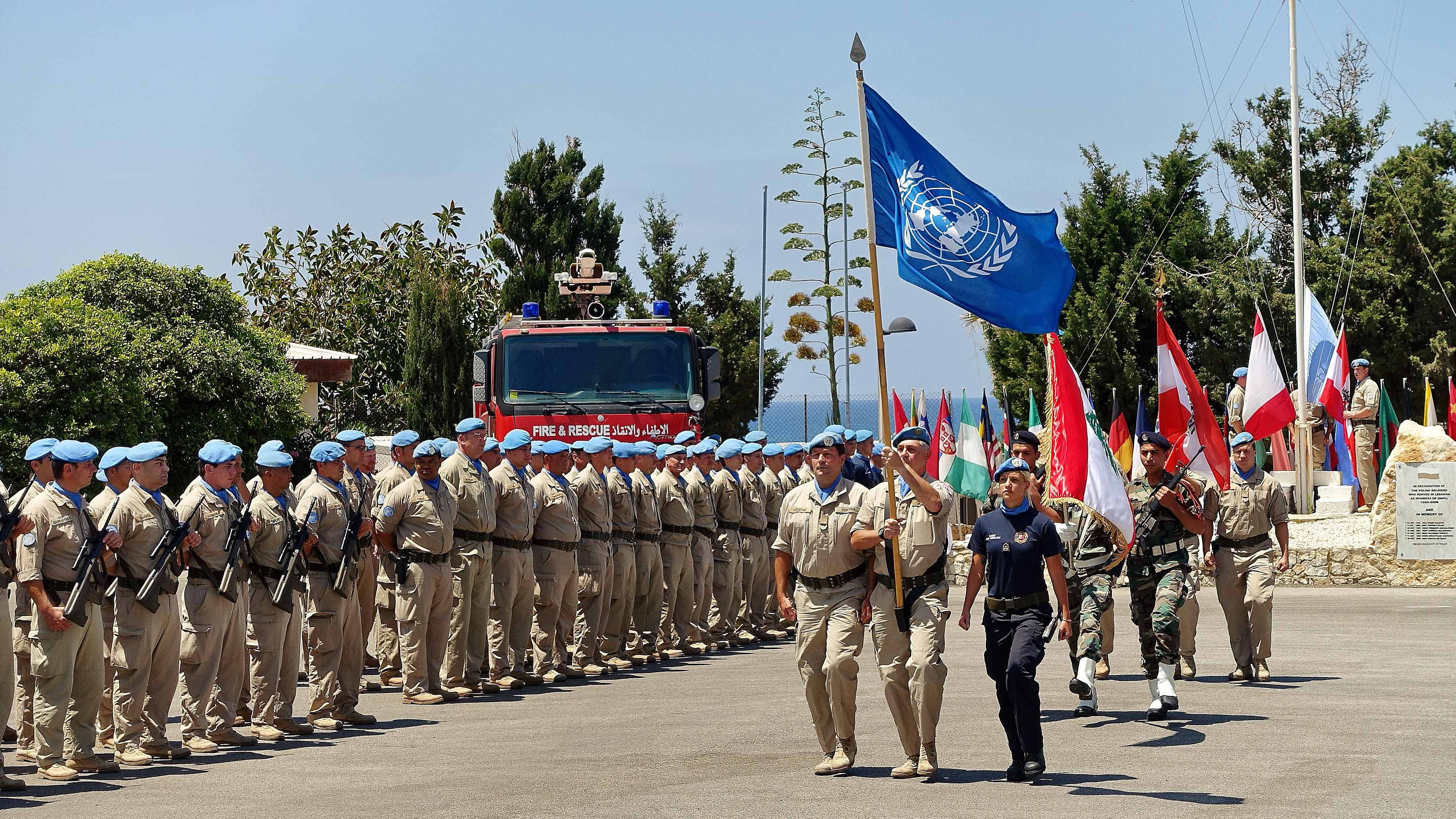
UN troops in An-Naqoura

In 1875, during the late Ottoman era, Victor Guérin described it: "The village stands upon a hill, on the south of which is a deep way, through which flows a spring called 'Ain Nakurah, which waters plantations of fig-trees and olives mixed with palms. The village contains 400 Metawileh. The houses are modern, but some of the materials appear ancient by their regularity and dimensions. There must, therefore, have been an older village here, the name of which was probably similar, if not identical." According to Guérin, the place is associated with the historic Ladder of the Tyrians (Scala Tyriorum).

In 1881, the PEF's Survey of Western Palestine (SWP) described it: "A village, built of stone, containing about 250 Moslems, situated on low hills by sea-coast. Gardens of olives, palms, pomegranates, figs, and arable land; brushwood to the east. Two springs with plentiful supply of water."

In 1978 UNIFIL established its headquarters around the former toll station beside An-Naqoura. Some of the buildings marked the end of the Lebanese section of the Beirut-Haifa railway which had been closed since Jewish forces blew up the tunnel into Palestine in 1948.

Following the 1982 invasion An-Naqoura became part of the Israeli Security Zone. In November 1983 Israeli and Lebanese officials began a series of meetings in the UN headquarters in An-Naqoura to negotiate an Israeli withdrawal.

In the autumn of 1986 Lahad’s South Lebanon Army constructed a small port in An-Naqoura from which a ferry connected to Jounieh, north of Beirut. On 3 September 1991 a Swedish soldier serving with UNIFIL, was killed when he was caught in a shootout between Palestinians and SLA gunmen in An-Naqoura.

Twelve days later, 15 September, another Swedish soldier was killed and five Swedish and French soldiers were wounded when Palestinian gunmen intending to carry out an attack on the Israeli city of Nahariya en route to their target by boat mistakenly landed in An-Naqoura and confronted UNIFIL troops. One of the gunmen was also killed and another injured.

During the 2024 Israel-Hezbollah conflict, Lebanese Health Ministry officials reported two deaths from an Israeli airstrike on a car in An-Naqoura. UN peacekeepers accused Israel of a "deliberate and direct" attack on their positions in Lebanon, following multiple incursions, including one incident in Ras an-Naqoura where Israeli military vehicles reportedly damaged a fence and concrete structure. The IDF claimed that Hezbollah rockets had hit UNIFIL’s An-Naqoura headquarters, lightly wounding eight Austrian soldiers. The EU condemned the violence, urging protection for UN personnel and the continuation of UNIFIL’s peacekeeping mission. During the Lebanon-Israel ceasefire of 2024 ground operations were conducted throughout the village by the IDF, who claimed to have found ammunition hidden by Hezbollah militants inside and in the vicinity of the village. In December 2024 reports claimed that the Israeli army demolished and detonated houses in the village.

In April 2026, UNIFIL reported that Israeli forces had removed 17 cameras facing the UN headquarters, which were responsible for monitoring the security of the peacekeepers inside the compound. During the first two weeks of April 2026, more than 100 buildings in An-Naqoura were destroyed by Israel.

== Demographics ==
In 2010, the village had 2,450 permanent residents, along with 1,700 others who were displaced or had migrated to other countries. In 2014 Muslims made up 98.98% of registered voters in An-Naqoura. 88.54% of the voters were Shiite Muslims and 10.43% were Sunni Muslims.

== Bibliography ==
- Conder, C.R.; Kitchener, H.H. (1881). The Survey of Western Palestine: Memoirs of the Topography, Orography, Hydrography, and Archaeology. Vol. 1. London: Committee of the Palestine Exploration Fund.
- Guérin, V. (1880). Description Géographique Historique et Archéologique de la Palestine (in French). Vol. 3: Galilee, pt. 2. Paris: L'Imprimerie Nationale.
- Palmer, E.H. (1881). The Survey of Western Palestine: Arabic and English Name Lists Collected During the Survey by Lieutenants Conder and Kitchener, R. E. Transliterated and Explained by E.H. Palmer. Committee of the Palestine Exploration Fund.
