= Timeline of the Israel–Hezbollah conflict (17 September – 26 November 2024) =

This timeline of the Israel–Hezbollah conflict covers the period that begins 17 September 2024, when electronic devices exploded throughout Lebanon and Syria, and ends prior to 27 November 2024, when the 2024 Israel–Lebanon ceasefire agreement was signed. Beginning 23 September, Israel began its airstrikes in Lebanon, on 27 September, they assassinated Hassan Nasrallah, and on 1 October, they invaded Lebanon.

Brief description of major events during this period:

- 17 September: Hours after the Security Cabinet of Israel declares that returning the residents of the north of Israel to their homes is a new goal of the war, pagers explode throughout Lebanon and Syria, killing 12 and injuring 2,750. Both militants and civilians among the killed, and injured.
- 18 September: walkie-talkies explode in the second wave of device explosions. 30 people are killed, with civilians being injured and some potentially killed.
- 20 September: 20 September 2024 Beirut attack, Hezbollah generals Ibrahim Aqil and Ahmed Wehbe killed, along with at least 29 civilians when an Israeli airstrike destroyed an apartment building.
- Beginning 23 September: Israel begins hitting targets in Lebanon in multiple airstrikes, killing at least 700 people so far and vowing to continue strikes. Lebanon's foreign minister Abdallah Bou Habib says that nearly 500,000 people have been displaced due to the attacks. Israel has refused calls for de-escalation, such as a 21-day ceasefire plan presented by France and the US, with Benjamin Netanyahu saying the strikes will continue "with full force" until the new war aim of returning residents of Israel to the north is met.
  - 23 September: Israel conducted mass airstrikes, a major escalation of the conflict. Residents were given only hours of notice to evacuate. Airstrikes were conducted all over Lebanon but focused on Southern Lebanon with its heavy Hezbollah presence. Roads were jammed with people fleeing, in some cases using both directions of roads to escape, with a road in Sidon having a 10 lane wide traffic jam on both sides of the road for vehicles being used to escape the airstrikes. Many civilians were killed, including 50 children. 23 September was the deadliest day of conflict in Lebanon since the Lebanese Civil War.
  - 27 September: Assassination of Hassan Nasrallah that targeted multiple buildings including apartment blocks in the densely populated Dahieh suburb of Beirut. The IDF states that the target was the main Hezbollah headquarters, located underneath residential buildings which were destroyed in the attack. Nasrallah's death was confirmed by Hezbollah in the hours after the strike. The confirmed death toll is at least six, but an Israeli official estimated the true death toll as "hundreds", with the count set to rise in the days following the attack.
- 1 October: Israel invaded Lebanon. Following the various escalations, a full-scale war was described as "inevitable". Following a night of heavy shelling, evacuation warnings and further airstrikes, an invasion was described as "imminent". Israeli then announced it had invaded Lebanon, in what it called a "targeted and demarcated ground operation in southern Lebanon". The 1982 invasion was similarly characterized as limited, although that sparked an occupation of 18 years.

== September ==
=== 17 September ===
- The Shin Bet said that it foiled a Hezbollah attempt to assassinate an unnamed former Israeli security official using a claymore mine.
- Israel announced that halting Hezbollah attacks to allow its citizens to return to the north was now an official war goal.
- Six Hezbollah members were killed by Israeli airstrikes in southern Lebanon, including three in an attack on a building in Blida.
- Several drones from Lebanon were intercepted or struck open areas after crossing into the Upper Galilee.
- At least 12 people were killed and more than 2,750 others including Hezbollah members and civilians were injured across Lebanon and Syria following multiple explosions blamed on pagers. Among those injured was the Iranian ambassador to Lebanon, Mojtaba Amani.
- Hezbollah announced that 12 of its members were killed by Israeli attacks.

=== 18 September ===
- Hezbollah walkie-talkies exploded in several parts of Lebanon, including Beirut, the Beqaa Valley, and the south. At least 27 were killed, while 708 others were injured. Hezbollah announced that 20 of its members were killed during the walkie-talkie explosions.
- Hezbollah claimed rocket attacks against Israeli artillery positions.
- At least two armored UNIFIL vehicles patrolling in Tyre came under attack by a group of men with stones.
- The Israel Defense Forces's (IDF) 98th Paratroopers Division was deployed to northern Israel after months of combat in Gaza.
- Israeli Defense Minister Yoav Gallant announced the beginning of a "new phase in the war" and stated that Israel's focus moved to the north.
- Over 40 rockets were fired by Hezbollah into northern Israel and the Golan Heights, including ten at Mount Hermon in the evening.
- The Israeli Air Force (IAF) struck buildings housing Hezbollah militants in Jibbain and rocket launchers and buildings in Halta, Kafr Kila, Odaisseh and Chamaa.

=== 19 September ===
- Hezbollah fired at least two anti-tank missiles at Ramim Ridge, killing a soldier from the Golani Brigade's 51st Battalion and wounding eight others at a border post. A Hezbollah drone attack in Ya'ara also killed an Israeli reserve commander and wounded another soldier.
- Several drones struck Beit Hillel and Kiryat Shmona, causing fires.
- The IAF conducted overnight strikes against Hezbollah buildings in Chihine, Taybeh, Blida, Meiss Ej Jabal, Aitaroun and Kafr Kila and a weapons depot in Khiam.
- The IDF announced that it began carrying out airstrikes aimed at destroying Hezbollah's capabilities. Over 70 airstrikes were conducted targeting around 100 rocket launchers, 1,000 rockets, and other infrastructure in southern Lebanon.
- Israeli fighter jets broke the sound barrier and shot flares over Beirut.
- Two Hezbollah militants were killed by Israeli forces and a third escaped after attempting to infiltrate the border and plant an explosive at the Al-Abbad outpost.
- Several rockets damaged at least 50 houses in Metula and caused fires. A woman was slightly injured from burns caused by the attack.

=== 20 September ===
- Hezbollah fired a total of 170 rockets at Israel, including around 120 rockets at the Golan Heights, Safed, and the Upper Galilee and 20 rockets at Meron and Netu'a. Several fires were caused, including at a playground in Safed.
- Israel launched an airstrike in Dahieh, Beirut targeting Hezbollah's operations commander Ibrahim Aqil. At least 45 people were killed including three children, while 68 others including five children were injured and 23 people were buried under the rubble. Aqil, Ahmad Mahmoud Wahabi (another member of the Redwan Force's top command) and nearly a dozen other senior commanders were among the 16 Hezbollah members killed.
- An Israeli airstrike on a vehicle near Damascus International Airport killed a senior commander of Kata'ib Hezbollah.
- Israel carried out a drone strike on a Hezbollah member entering a building in Kafr Kila.
- The IAF struck Hezbollah buildings in Aitaroun, Kafr Kila, Meiss Ej Jabal, Taybeh, Odaisseh and Yaroun.
- Hezbollah said that it fired two barrages of Katyusha rockets at an Israeli intelligence headquarters in northern Israel.

=== 21 September ===
- Hezbollah fired 90 rockets at Kiryat Shmona, Safed, and other communities, igniting fires across northern Israel. A home in Keitiya and Highway 89 near Safed were directly struck. Hezbollah announced that it targeted 11 IDF positions.
- The IAF struck 400 Hezbollah targets in southern Lebanon throughout the day. Targets included thousands of rocket launchers and infrastructure.
- The IDF claimed to have "almost completely dismantled" Hezbollah's military chain of command.
- Hezbollah announced the death of two of its members.
- The IDF imposed restrictions on gatherings in parts of northern Israel and the Golan Heights.

=== 22 September ===
- Hezbollah fired 150 rockets into Israel in the early morning targeting the Haifa area and Jezreel Valley. Six people were injured, including three people in Kiryat Bialik, and one person was killed in a car crash reportedly caused by panic from the barrage. Several buildings and houses were damaged. Hezbollah said it targeted the Ramat David Airbase in its furthest attack in Israel since the conflict began.
- The IAF carried out 60 airstrikes in southern Lebanon, killing three people, including at least two Hezbollah members, and injuring two others.
- Hezbollah launched explosive drones at two IDF positions in northern Israel.
- An IDF officer was slightly injured in a Hezbollah anti-tank missile strike in Ramim Ridge.

=== 23 September ===
- The IDF urged citizens near Hezbollah positions in southern Lebanon and some of Beirut to evacuate. UNIFIL also told its employees in the region to move north of the Litani River.
- The IDF began extensive strikes against Hezbollah targets in Lebanon in what it called Operation Northern Arrows. It conducted over 1,600 strikes in Lebanon throughout the day, killing at least 558 people and injuring more than 1,835 others including children, women and paramedics according to the Lebanese Health Ministry.
- Hezbollah fired about 240 rockets into Israel, the West Bank, and the Golan Heights, injuring five people. It first fired 35 rockets into northern Israel targeting IDF bases and warehouses, lightly injuring a man in the Lower Galilee. It later fired around 80 rockets, targeting several locations including Ariel and Karnei Shomron in the occupied West Bank and Haifa. The group targeted IDF bases and Rafael Advanced Defense Systems facilities.
- Ali Karaki, the commander of Hezbollah's Southern Front, was targeted in an Israeli airstrike in Beirut. Hezbollah said that he survived the attack.
- The US said that it would send additional personnel to the Middle East due to heightening tensions.
- A Hamas field commander was killed in an Israeli airstrike in southern Lebanon.
- Two Palestinian civilians were injured and significant damage was caused by a Hezbollah rocket attack in Deir Istiya.

=== 24 September ===
- Hezbollah said that it launched six strikes targeting Israeli airbases and an explosives factory.
- The IDF said that it struck Hezbollah launchers used to launch missiles targeting Megiddo Airfield. It also struck dozens of other Hezbollah targets in southern Lebanon.
- Hezbollah claimed to have struck the logistical warehouses of the 146th Division in the Ramot Naftali IDF base using missiles and Kiryat Shmona with rockets.
- Hezbollah fired around 300 rockets at northern Israel throughout the day, targeting the Upper Galilee and south of Haifa and injuring six people. Heavy damage was inflicted on buildings and a cemetery in Kiryat Shmona. A reservist was injured by shrapnel in the Mount Carmel area. The IDF said that about 10 projectiles were launched from Lebanon to the HaAmakim area.
- The IDF carried out a targeted strike in Beirut, killing the commander of Hezbollah's rocket and missile unit Ibrahim Qubaisi and five other people including two UNHCR staff and injuring 15 people.
- Hezbollah said that it used a new missile named Fadi-3 to target an IDF base.
- Hezbollah said that its rockets targeted Katzrin.
- Hezbollah said that it launched a total of 90 missiles targeting Dado IDF base twice in the vicinity of Safed.
- The IDF said that it was conducting a new series of “widespread strikes” against Hezbollah targets in Lebanon.
- Hezbollah claimed that its drones struck the Atlit naval base in the vicinity of Haifa.
- At least 13 people were killed in other Israeli air strikes in southern Lebanon.
- Israeli air strikes struck Jieh.

=== 25 September ===
- The IAF struck a total of 280 Hezbollah sites across Lebanon, including weapons depots and rocket launchers. The Lebanese Health Ministry announced that at least 72 people were killed and 392 others were injured in the attacks.
- Al Jazeera reported that Israeli strikes in Karak killed 15 civilians.
- A surface-to-surface missile was launched from Lebanon towards Tel Aviv. Hezbollah said that its ballistic missile targeted Mossad headquarters in the vicinity of the city.
- Israeli air strikes struck Hezbollah targets including in villages and towns around Tyre, while Hezbollah rockets were intercepted by the Iron Dome.
- An Israeli air strike in Maaysrah, Keserwan District killed three people and wounded nine others.
- An Israeli air strike in Ain Qana killed three people and injured 13 others.
- Al-Manar TV cameraman Kamel Karaki was killed in an Israeli air strike in Qantara.
- Hezbollah fired 40 rockets at the Upper Galilee, striking an assisted living facility in Safed.
- Noa Kirel's concert in Tel Aviv scheduled for the next day was cancelled due to Hezbollah's missile attack on central Israel.
- An Israeli strike in Joun killed four people and injured seven others.
- An Israeli air strike in Bint Jbeil killed four people.
- Two people were killed and 27 injured during the bombardment of Tebnine, southern Lebanon.
- An Israeli air strike in Tebnine killed three people and injured 20 others.
- Several Israeli air strikes in Baalbek-Hermel Governorate killed at least seven people and injured 38 others.
- An Israeli strike in Maroun al-Ras injured two people.
- An Israeli strike in Ainata injured one person.
- Hezbollah missile strikes in Sa'ar injured two people.
- Lebanese Foreign Minister Abdallah Bou Habib announced that nearly 500,000 people were displaced due to Israeli attacks in Lebanon.
- The IDF claimed to have destroyed 60 Hezbollah intelligence directorate targets.
- Global Affairs Canada announced that two Canadian citizens were killed by Israeli attacks in Lebanon.
- Five people including an infant were killed in an Israeli air strike in Chehour.
- A Hezbollah rocket hit a cable car at the Mount Hermon ski resort.
- An Israeli air strike on a house in Byblos killed one person.
- IDF chief Herzi Halevi said that the airstrikes in Lebanon were laying the foundation for a ground offensive into Lebanon.
- Seven hundred British soldiers were sent to British-controlled parts of Cyprus in preparation to evacuate UK citizens from Lebanon.
- An explosion in Tyre caused a nearby building to collapse, killing a French citizen.
- Two Israelis were slightly wounded in a drone strike by the Islamic Resistance in Iraq on the Port of Eilat.
- Hezbollah claimed that its air defense units forced two Israeli aircraft to return from Lebanese airspace and said that it targeted Kiryat Motzkin with rockets and Fadi-1 missiles.
- By the end of the day, at least 1,247 people had been killed and 5,278 had been injured by Israeli airstrikes in Lebanon.

=== 26 September ===
- The IDF said that it struck 220 Hezbollah targets in Lebanon. The Lebanese Health Ministry announced that 92 people were killed and 153 others were injured in the attacks.
  - An Israeli air strike in Aita al-Shaab killed three people.
  - An Israeli strike in Qana killed a Syrian national and injured another person.
  - An Israeli strike on a three-storey building in Younine killed at least 19 Syrians and a Lebanese, majority of them women or children and injured eight others.
  - Three people were killed and 17 others were injured in Israeli air strikes in the Tyre area.
  - An Israeli air strike destroyed a bridge in the Lebanese side of the Lebanon-Syria border in the northeastern Hermel region and injured five people. The IDF said that it destroyed an infrastructure used by Hezbollah to transfer weapons from Syria.
  - An Israeli airstrike in Dahieh targeting Mohammed Srur, the commander of Hezbollah's drone unit, killed two people including the target and injured at least 15 others including a woman.
- Approximately 45 rockets were launched from Lebanon towards northern Israel.
  - Hezbollah said that its missiles targeted Rafael Advanced Defense Systems facilities in the Zevulun area.
- Hezbollah fired more than 130 rockets into northern Israel, striking areas in Mount Meron, Safed, Birya and Kiryat Ata, injuring an Israeli man.
- Israeli bombardment killed an elderly French woman in southern Lebanon.

=== 27 September ===
- At least 25 people were killed in Israeli strikes in Lebanon.
- An Israeli air strike in Tyre killed two Lebanese women. The IDF said that it targeted Hezbollah rocket launchers and infrastructure.
- Shrapnel from an intercepted rocket wounded a man in Tiberias after Hezbollah fired ten rockets at the area.
- An Israeli airstrike on a Syrian military position near Kfeir Yabous, on the border with Lebanon, killed five soldiers and injured one.
- An Israeli airstrike in Shebaa killed nine members of a family, including four children and a pregnant woman.
- Hezbollah said that it targeted Ilaniya and Kiryat Ata using Fadi-1 missiles.
- The IDF said that it struck Hezbollah's central headquarters in Beirut targeting Hezbollah secretary-general Hassan Nasrallah. Al-Manar reported that four buildings collapsed in the attack. Six people died and at least 100 were injured. Nasrallah was killed in the strike alongside prominent IRGC general Abbas Nilforoushan and senior Hezbollah commander Ali Karaki.
- Hezbollah fired 65 rockets at Safed, causing damage and lightly injuring a woman.
- The IDF struck three buildings that it said stored Hezbollah anti-ship missiles in Dahieh. Hezbollah denied that weapons were present in the buildings.
- The IDF claimed to have killed the commander of Hamas in southern Syria through an airstrike in Syria.

=== 28 September ===
- The IDF said that it struck hundreds of Hezbollah targets. The Lebanese Health Ministry announced that 33 people were killed and 195 others were injured in the attacks.
- The IDF claimed to have killed Muhammad Ali Ismail, the commander of Hezbollah's rocket unit in southern Lebanon, his deputy, and other commanders and militants in an airstrike, Hezbollah has yet to confirm the claims.
- Ten rockets were launched from Lebanon towards Upper Galilee.
- A surface-to-surface missile was launched from Lebanon to central Israel.
- Hezbollah said that it targeted Ramat David Airbase with Fadi-3 missiles and Kabri with Fadi-1 missiles.
- The IAF said that it struck "dozens” of Hezbollah targets in the Bekaa Valley and other places in southern Lebanon.
- The Lebanese National News Agency (NNA) reported that IDF strikes struck civil defense centres and a medical clinic in Taybeh and Deir Siriane, killing 11 medical staff and injuring 10 others.
- Lebanese Civil Defense said that one of its staff was killed and another staff member was seriously injured in southern Beirut.
- Hezbollah said that its artillery targeted a group of soldiers at the “al-Sadah” IDF site, while its rockets targeted Sa'ar and Rosh Pinna.
- The IDF announced that Hezbollah fired around 90 missiles at northern Israel, Tel Aviv and the West Bank throughout the day.
- The IDF carried out a targeted strike in Dahieh against Hassan Khalil Yassin, the commander of Hezbollah's intelligence division and a senior member of the group's aerial weapons unit.
- A Hezbollah missile landed near the Israeli outpost of Mitzpe Hagit, near Jerusalem, causing a fire and power outages in nearby communities.
- A rocket from Lebanon crashed into an uninhabited area in Al-Muwaqqar, Jordan, causing no casualties or damage.
- Two drones were launched from southern Lebanon to western Galilee.

=== 29 September ===
- The IDF said that it struck more than 120 Hezbollah targets. The Lebanese Health Ministry announced that 105 people were killed and 359 others were injured in the attacks.
- The Lebanese National News Agency reported that Israeli warplanes struck a civil defense center killing four people and injuring several others.
- The IDF announced that senior Hezbollah official Nabil Qaouk was killed in an airstrike in Dahieh the previous day.
- An Israeli airstrike in Dahr-al-Ain killed 11 people.
- Hezbollah fired eight rockets at Tiberias, causing no casualties. Hezbollah said that it launched Fadi 1 missiles targeting Ofek IDF base in northern Israel.
- The Islamic Risala Scout Association said that four of its members were killed in Tayr Debba and another member was killed in Kabrikha.
- The NNA reported that at least 17 members of a family were killed and several others were trapped under rubble in an Israeli air strike in Zboud.
- Hezbollah said that it launched attacks on soldiers in Manara and its rockets targeted Sa'ar.
- The Lebanese Health Ministry said that 14 rescuers were killed in Israeli strikes in two days.
- Hezbollah said that its rockets targeted Safed and another "smaller location" in northern Israel.
- An Israeli strike in Ain El Delb killed 45 people and injured at least 75 others.
- A second French national was killed in Lebanon.
- A projectile was launched from Lebanon towards northern Israel.
- An Israeli strike in Bekaa killed 12 people and injured 20 others.

=== 30 September ===
- The Lebanese Health Ministry announced that at least 95 people were killed and 172 others were injured in Israeli attacks.
- An Israeli airstrike on an apartment in central Beirut killed three members of the Popular Front for the Liberation of Palestine (PFLP), including the commanders of its military and security divisions in Lebanon.
- Hamas said that its leader in Lebanon and concurrent member of its overseas leadership Fatah Sharif and his wife, daughter and son was killed in an Israeli strike at his house in Al-Bass camp in southern Lebanon.
- An Israeli strike in Tyre killed a Lebanese Army soldier and five of his relatives and trapped others under the rubble. Other relatives said that those killed were mostly women and children.
- The IDF launched raids in al-Abbassieh, Harouf and Bedias.
- A Lebanese Army soldier was killed by an Israeli airstrike in Wazzani.
- Six paramedics were killed and four were injured in an Israeli strike on a civil defence centre in Sahmar.
- Hezbollah fired 35 rockets into northern Israel and the Golan Heights. Hezbollah said that it targeted Safed and Gesher HaZiv using rockets.
- The IDF declared the areas of Metula, Misgav Am, and Kfar Giladi closed military zones, prohibiting entry to civilians.
- The IAF conducted at least six airstrikes in Dahieh after issuing evacuation orders for residents of several buildings in the suburb, with planes also dropping thermal flares in the area.
- The Lebanese Armed Forces abandoned positions close to the border, withdrawing more than 5 km away from the border with Israel.
- Multiple sources described an "imminent" ground invasion of Lebanon, with tanks massing on the border, heavy shelling of border villagers and Defence Minister Yoav Gallant telling troops that Israel would use "all the means that may be required ... from the air, from the sea and on land. Good luck".
- Hezbollah said that it targeted IDF positions in the Golan Heights with rockets. Hezbollah also said that it targeted Kfar Giladi with a long-range anti-ship cruise missile, a northern Israel settlement with rockets, areas in northern Haifa with Fadi 1 missiles. The IDF said that 10 rockets were launched from Lebanon towards northern Israel. Hezbollah also claimed to have struck movements of Israeli troops in orchards opposite Odaisseh and Kafr Kila.
- At least three people including a journalist were killed and nine people were injured in a suspected Israeli strike in the Mezzeh neighbourhood of Damascus. An Iranian Islamic Revolutionary Guards Corps (IRGC) consultant later died from injuries sustained in the strike. Syrian state media reported that Syrian air defenses intercepted "hostile targets" following a blast.
- Israeli jets bombed and destroyed the headquarters of the pro-Hezbollah As-Sirat TV channel in southern Beirut. There were no reported injuries.

== October ==
=== 1 October ===
- The Lebanese Health Ministry announced that at least 55 people were killed and 156 others were injured in Israeli attacks.
- The IDF confirmed that it was conducting a "limited, localized" ground operation into southern Lebanon.
- The IDF said that about 10 rockets were launched from southern Lebanon to Israel.
- A drone was launched towards central Israel.
- Hezbollah said that it targeted IDF sites, Israeli soldiers and settlements with 12 separate strikes.
- An Israeli strike on the house of Munir al-Maqdah, a brigadier general of the Al-Aqsa Martyrs' Brigades in Lebanon in Ein al-Hilweh refugee camp killed at least five people and injuring several others and trapped several people under the rubble. al-Maqdah reportedly survived the assassination attempt but his son was killed in the strike.
- Three rockets were launched from Lebanon towards Upper Galilee.
- An Israeli strike on a house in Al-Dawoudiya killed at least 10 people and injured five others.
- Hezbollah said that it targeted Israeli soldiers in Metula with rockets and artillery.
- The IDF said that heavy fighting is taking place in southern Lebanon with Hezbollah. It also warned residents not to move in vehicles from north of the Litani River to south of the river. The IDF also said that projectiles were launched to Avivim and Metula.
- "A number of" rockets were launched from Lebanon to Israel, moderately injuring two people. Hezbollah said that it targeted Unit 8200 headquarters in Tel Aviv with Fadi-4 rockets and Mossad headquarters in the suburbs of Tel Aviv.
- The IDF issued an urgent warning for residents of 25 villages in southern Lebanon to evacuate to the north of the Awali River.
- Hezbollah denied that Israeli soldiers entered into Lebanon.
- Approximately 30 rockets were launched from Lebanon towards northern Israel.
- The IDF said that it had conducted over 70 ground raids in southern Lebanon since November 2023, destroying thousands of targets and gathering intelligence on Hezbollah positions.
- Syrian military sources said that Israel struck two Syrian anti-aircraft radar stations west of Sweida and a Syrian anti-aircraft radar station in Daraa Governorate.
- The IDF conducted at least two airstrikes in Dahieh.
- Hezbollah said that it targeted with missiles the Sde Dov airbase in the outskirts of Tel Aviv, that was closed and demolished more than 4 years before the attack.
- The IDF claimed that Muhammad Jaafar Qasir, a Hezbollah commander responsible for transferring Iranian weapons to Hezbollah in Lebanon, was killed in an airstrike in Beirut.
- The IRGC launched approximately 200 ballistic missiles toward Israel, with at least one building being hit in Tel Aviv. The attack was in response to the assassination of Abbas Nilforoushan, Hassan Nasrallah, Ismail Haniyeh. At least two Israelis were slightly injured in Tel Aviv and a Palestinian was killed by shrapnel in Nu'eima, West Bank. Iran said that 90% of its missiles had hit their targets, but the IDF disputed this claim, saying that "a large number" of missiles were intercepted. A number of impact sites were identified in the wake of the strikes, but the exact location of those impacts and the extent of the damage they caused is barred from publication by the IDF censor.
- The IDF said that it killed the commander of Hezbollah's Imam Husayn division in an airstrike in Beirut.
- The IAF struck 100 Hezbollah targets in Lebanon while soldiers of the Northern Command destroyed several military sites and weapons.

=== 2 October ===
- The Lebanese Health Ministry announced that at least 46 people were killed and 85 others were injured in Israeli attacks.
- The IDF announced the death of eight soldiers during combat in southern Lebanon.
- Israeli forces were ambushed by Hezbollah fighters in Odaisseh and forced to retreat while attempting to dismantle militant infrastructure. Six soldiers from the Egoz Unit were killed and several others were injured, including five seriously. The IDF said that another 20 Hezbollah militants were killed during the clash.
- Two soldiers of the Golani Brigade were killed and another was injured in combat in southern Lebanon. A medic from the brigade was injured in a separate incident.
- Israeli aircraft struck the southern suburbs of Beirut.
- Hezbollah fired over 240 rockets at northern Israel, resulting in one person being injured by glass shards in the Western Galilee. Hezbollah said that it targeted areas north of Haifa using missiles. It also targeted Shtula and Israeli infantry in Misgav Am.
- Hezbollah claimed to have inflicted casualties on IsraeIi soldiers entering Maroun al-Ras from its eastern side.
- The Lebanese army said that an Israeli force crossed the Blue Line and withdrew after a short time.
- The IDF announced that the IAF struck 150 Hezbollah sites since the ground offensive began.
- A Lebanese army soldier was injured in an Israeli drone strike while one of its units was working to open a road at the entrance of Kawkaba.
- Israeli Foreign Minister Israel Katz declared United Nations Secretary-General Antonio Guterres persona non grata in Israel for not condemning the October 2024 Iranian strikes against Israel in a statement on the Middle East conflict.
- Hezbollah claimed to have killed or injured Israeli soldiers trying to circumvent Yaroun by detonating an explosive device.
- Hezbollah fired 40 rockets at Safed and several drones at the Upper Galilee.
- Hezbollah said that it destroyed three Merkava tanks using guided rockets in Maroun al-Ras.
- Syrian state media reported that at least three people were killed and three injured in an Israeli drone strike in Damascus. The strike killed the brother of the commander of Hezbollah's Unit 4400, who was also killed the day prior.
- Hezbollah claimed to have killed or injured all members of an Israeli infantry unit sheltering in a home outside Kafr Kila by detonating an explosive device in the house and targeting it using bullets and rocket-propelled grenades.
- Hezbollah said that it targeted Israeli soldiers in Ya'ara with rockets.
- An Israeli airstrike on a Hezbollah-run civilian health facility in the Bashoura district of Beirut killed at least nine health and rescue workers and injured 14 others. The NNA claimed that the IDF used phosphorus bombs, while local residents claimed to smell sulfur in the wake of the attack.
- An Israeli air strike destroyed three houses in the Bekaa Valley killing 11 people including four children.
- The commander of Hezbollah's Shebaa Farms division was killed by an Israeli airstrike. The IDF said that he was responsible for the Majdal Shams attack.

=== 3 October ===
- The Lebanese Health Ministry announced that at least 37 people were killed and 151 others were injured in Israeli attacks.
- A US citizen was killed in an Israeli airstrike in Lebanon.
- Hezbollah said that it launched surface-to-air missiles targeting an IDF helicopter flying above Beit Hillel and claimed that it forced it to retreat.
- Approximately 200 rockets and several drones were launched from Lebanon towards Israel.
- An Israeli strike on the municipality building in Bint Jbeil killed 15 people. The IDF said that Hezbollah fighters were killed and the building was used by Hezbollah to store weapons.
- A Lebanese soldier was killed and four Lebanese Red Cross medics and another Lebanese soldier were injured in an Israeli strike in Taybeh while they were working on a rescue and evacuation mission.
- Two Belgian journalists were wounded in Beirut.
- Hezbollah launched more than a dozen of strikes on Israeli targets.
- Hezbollah claimed to have killed or wounded a group of Israeli soldiers in the vicinity of Maroun al-Ras by detonating two explosive devices.
- The Lebanese Army said that one of its soldiers was killed in an Israeli strike on a military outpost in Bint Jbeil. It also said that its soldiers responded to the sources of fire.
- The IAF struck Hezbollah intelligence and communications sites in Beirut.
- Hezbollah fired ten rockets at the Lower Galilee, causing no casualties.
- The World Health Organization said that 28 health care workers were killed in Lebanon over the past 24 hours.
- Lebanese Health Minister Firass Abiad said that 40 paramedics and firefighters including emergency personnel from organisations affiliated with Hezbollah were killed in Lebanon in three days.
- Hezbollah claimed that it detonated a Sejil bomb at Israeli forces in Yaroun, causing casualties. It also claimed to have launched a missile against a Merkava tank in Netu'a, while a rocket salvo targeted Israeli troops in Al-Thaghra in the outskirts of Odaisseh.
- Hezbollah fired 100 Katyusha rockets, six Falaq rockets and mortars at Metula. Hezbollah said that it targeted Safed and Kafr Giladi using rockets.
- An Israeli airstrike on a building in southern Lebanon, around an area where soldiers from the Golani Brigade were operating, killed a Hezbollah field commander.
- The IDF announced that an officer of the Paratroopers Brigade's 202nd Battalion was killed in combat the day prior, raising the IDF's death toll in Lebanon to nine.
- Hezbollah claimed to have killed 17 Israeli soldiers.
- The IDF said that it struck 15 Hezbollah sites in Beirut, including weapons depots and manufacturing sites.
- Senior Hezbollah official Hashem Safieddine, who is expected to succeed Nasrallah as the group's secretary-general following his assassination, was reportedly targeted by an Israeli airstrike in Dahieh.
- The IDF announced that an Israeli airstrike in Beirut earlier in the week killed a senior member of Hezbollah's weapons manufacturing division.
- The IDF said that the head of Hezbollah's communications division was killed in an airstrike in Beirut.

=== 4 October ===
- The Lebanese Health Ministry announced that at least 25 people were killed and 127 others were injured in Israeli attacks.
- The IDF halted traffic at the Masnaa Border Crossing between Syria and Lebanon by striking “vital transportation infrastructure” using two missiles. The IDF alleged that the border crossing is used by Hezbollah for transferring weapons from Syria to Lebanon one day prior to the strike.
- Hezbollah said that it targeted Haifa using rockets.
- UNICEF said that 690 children were injured in Lebanon in six weeks.
- Hezbollah claimed to have struck Ilania IDF base using rockets.
- The NNA reported that four health workers were killed in an Israeli drone strike in the vicinity of a government hospital in Marjayoun.
- A rocket launched from Lebanon fell in Upper Galilee area causing a forest fire. About 50 instances of rockets or shrapnel falling were reported in Metula in the past 24 hours.
- Hezbollah launched around 180 rockets towards Israel.
- Hezbollah claimed to have inflicted casualties and wounds on Israeli forces trying to advance to Odaisseh by carrying out an “huge explosion”.
- The IDF said that over 250 Hezbollah fighters were killed in southern Lebanon since it began its ground offensive, including 21 field commanders.
- Hezbollah claimed to have struck a group of Israeli soldiers in the vicinity of Maroun al-Ras. Hezbollah said that it launched a missile strike on the Nafah IDF base in the Golan Heights and it also said that it targeted Kfar Giladi.
- The IDF said that it struck Hezbollah weapons warehouses and infrastructure, including its intelligence headquarters in Beirut.

=== 5 October ===
- The Lebanese Health Ministry announced that at least 23 people were killed and 93 others were injured in Israeli attacks.
- Hamas confirmed the death of Saeed Atallah Ali, one of its military officials, along with his wife and two young daughters in an Israeli drone strike in Beddawi refugee camp.
- Hezbollah said that it launched rockets targeting Israeli soldiers in Khallet Ubair village in Yaroun, as well as on Kafrioufel and Kfar Giladi in northern Israel.
- An Israeli strike on a mosque in Bint Jbeil also hit nearby Salah Ghandour Hospital injuring nine of its medical staff. The IDF said that it targeted Hezbollah fighters in a command center embedded inside the mosque without providing evidence.
- Hezbollah claimed to have inflicted casualties by hitting a Merkava tank advancing in the Maroun forest with a guided anti-armour missile. Hezbollah said that it launched at least seven strikes on Israeli forces including launching Fadi 1 missiles targeting Ramat David IDF base and launching rockets targeting Israeli soldiers in the vicinity of the border.
- A female Red Cross volunteer from Baalbek died of a head injury sustained in an Israeli airstrike.
- A Hezbollah rocket attack lightly injured three people in Deir al-Asad and caused damage in Karmiel.
- Al Jazeera English reported that a missile hit in the vicinity of a paramedic team to prevent them from reaching the site of a bigger strike in a Beirut suburb.
- An Israeli airstrike in the Beqaa Valley killed Mohammed Hussein al-Lawis, who the IDF said was the executive authority of Hamas in Lebanon.
- The IDF estimated that at least 440 Hezbollah fighters were killed in its ground offensive in Lebanon.
- An alleged Israeli drone strike on a car near Hama, Syria killed one person and injured three others.
- The IAF conducted overnight strikes against Hezbollah command centers and other sites in Beirut.
- Hezbollah fired 60 rockets at the Galilee in two barrages.
- Hezbollah said that its rockets targeted a “military industries company” east of Acre.
- The IDF struck several Hezbollah targets in Dahieh soon after warning residents in parts of the suburb to evacuate.
- Hezbollah fired 30 rockets at Kiryat Shmona.
- Israeli Prime Minister Benjamin Netanyahu claimed to have destroyed a large part of Hezbollah's arsenal and its tunnels in the vicinity of the Israel Lebanon border.
- Hezbollah said that it launched at least 15 strikes on Israel including its rockets targeting a group of Israeli soldiers in the "Jal al-Deir site”. Hezbollah also said that its drones targeted an IDF base in the vicinity of Lake Tabarayya.
- Walla reported that 110 injured people including soldiers arrived at Ziv Hospital in Safed by quoting hospital officials.
- Hezbollah claimed to have killed at least 25 Israeli soldiers.
- French president Emmanuel Macron called for halting weapons deliveries to Israel for its Gaza war and its war in Lebanon.

=== 6 October ===
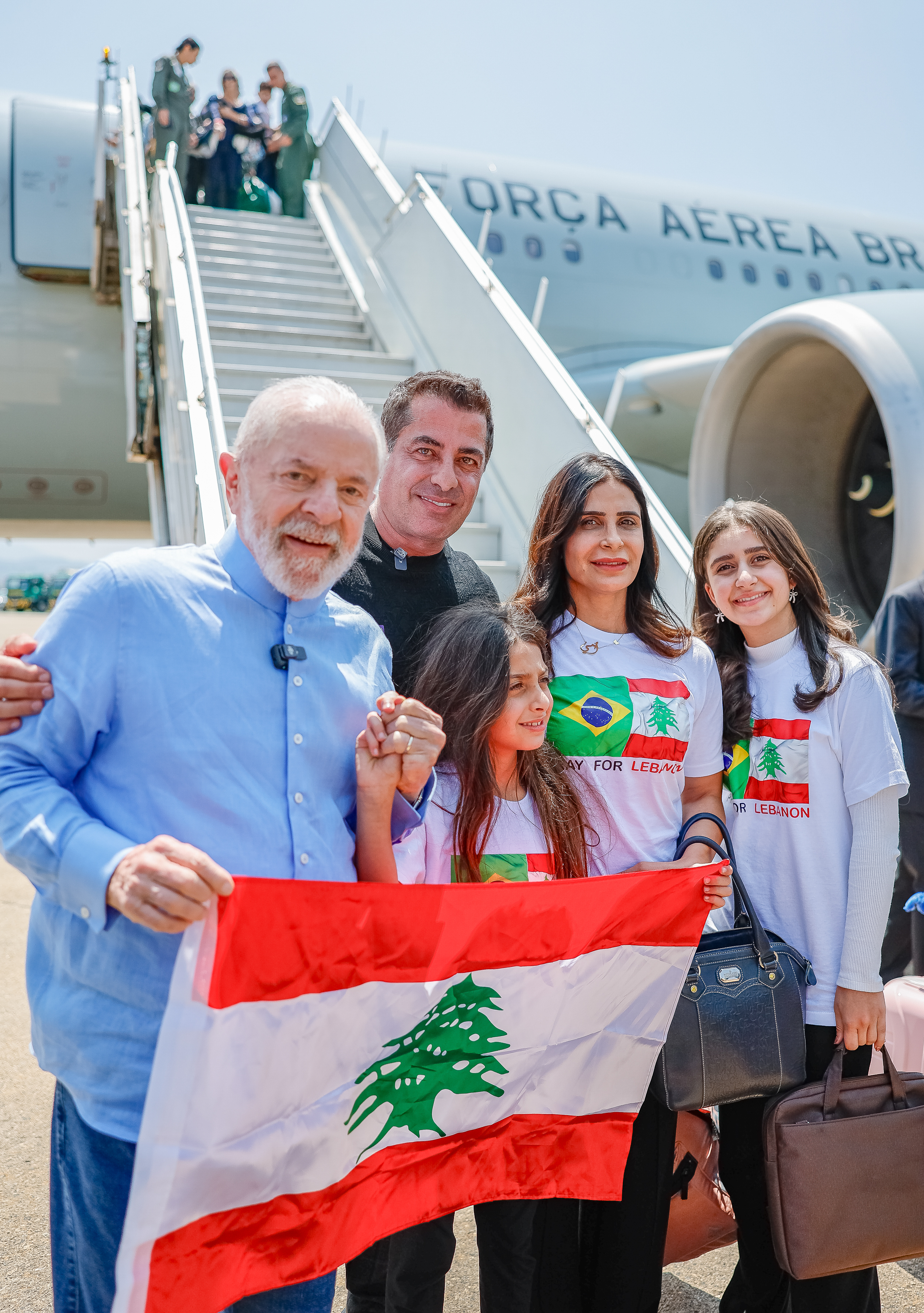
Brazilian President Lula da Silva receiving repatriated Brazilian nationals from Lebanon on 6 October 2024

- The Lebanese Health Ministry announced that at least 22 people were killed and 111 others were injured in Israeli attacks.
- Hezbollah claimed that its attacks on Israeli soldiers trying to infiltrate Khallet Shuaib in Blida forced them to retreat. It also said that it launched rockets and missiles towards Israeli soldiers in Manara.
- Two surface-to-surface missiles were launched from Lebanon towards northern Israel.
- The IDF ordered residents of 25 villages in southern Lebanon including Hula, Meiss Ej Jabal, and Bilda to evacuate to north of the Awali River.
- The IDF said that its airstrike killed Hezbollah commander Hacher Ali Tawil in Kafr Kila who was responsible for an anti-tank missile attack in Yuval which killed two Israeli civilians in January.
- Three people were injured in a suspected Israeli missile strike on three trucks carrying humanitarian aid to Lebanon at an Iranian car factory in an industrial area in Homs.
- The IDF said that it struck 150 Hezbollah targets in the past 24 hours, adding that approximately 25 rockets and multiple drones were launched by Hezbollah.
- Hezbollah said that it launched at least seven strikes on Israeli positions including launching rockets on IDF sites in the vicinity of the border.
- Hezbollah said that it launched drones targeting an IDF base south of Haifa.
- The IDF strictly prohibited entry to Manara, Yiftah and Malkia by declaring them as closed military zones. This was the third closed military zone declared by IDF since the beginning of the Israeli invasion of Lebanon.
- The Syndicate Of Chemists in Lebanon claimed that IDF used bombs containing depleted uranium in Lebanon.
- Ten people were injured by shrapnel in Haifa after Israeli air defenses failed to intercept a Hezbollah attack of five rockets targeting the city.
- A Hezbollah rocket attack in Tiberas injured one person and caused damage.
- Hezbollah fired rockets at Israeli soldiers in Ma'alot-Tarshiha, Braam and Nimra IDF base, west of Tiberias.It also launched Fadi 1 missiles at Carmel IDF base, south of Haifa.

=== 7 October ===
- The IDF announced that two reservists from the elite Unit 5515 were killed and another was seriously injured in a mortar attack on the border with Lebanon.
- Two Israeli airstrikes on towns south of Beirut killed at least 12 people, including several Lebanese children.
- Hezbollah said that it targeted Karmiel with rockets.
- A rocket apparently launched from Lebanon fell in Kfar Vradim, causing property damage.
- The IDF said that its 91st Division, including reservists, started a ground operation in southern Lebanon.
- Hezbollah fired missiles targeting IDF vehicles and personnel at the Jal al-Allam IDF site.
- Israeli warplanes struck a fire station building affiliated with the Islamic Health Authority in Baraachit, killing ten firefighters.
- The IDF carried out a targeted strike in Dahieh.
- Hezbollah fired 190 rockets at northern Israel, injuring at least 12 people.
- Hezbollah fired "a large barrage of rockets" towards area north of Haifa.
- At least 130 towns and villages across southern Lebanon were placed under IDF evacuation orders.
- The IDF said that it struck over 120 Hezbollah targets including its elite Redwan Force and Southern Front within an hour.
- Hezbollah fired five missiles at central Israel. Hezbollah said that its missiles targeted an IDF intelligence unit in the Tel Aviv suburbs.
- The IDF ordered civilians in the vicinity of the coast of southern Lebanon to evacuate to the south of the Awali River.
- The IDF said that it struck Hezbollah intelligence headquarters in Beirut.

=== 8 October ===
- The Lebanese Health Ministry announced that at least 22 people were killed and 80 others were injured in Israeli attacks.
- Hezbollah launched volleys of rockets and missiles towards Israeli soldiers in Shlomi, Hanita and Marj.
- Hezbollah said that it targeted Israeli artillery positions in Dishon and Dalton with rockets and missiles. It also said that it hit Israeli soldiers in Yaroun with missiles. Rockets were also launched from southern Lebanon to sites in Upper Galilee.
- The IDF claimed that it killed Hezbollah headquarters commander Suhail Hussein Husseini in a strike the day prior in Beirut. The IDF said that he was in charge of transferring weapons from Iran and distributing it to various units of Hezbollah and that he was “involved in the budgeting and logical management of the most sensitive projects of the organisation, including the operational plan for war".
- The IDF said that its 146th Division was deployed one day prior for “limited, localised and targeted operations” targeting Hezbollah in southwestern Lebanon.
- Hezbollah fired over 100 rockets at Haifa in two barrages, damaging several houses and injuring a woman. Hezbollah also claimed that its drone hit a gathering of Israeli soldiers in the “al-Baghdadi” IDF outpost in northern Israel. The IDF later said that its warplanes struck some of the launchers used by Hezbollah to launch rockets to Haifa.
- The IAF struck Hezbollah rocket and antitank weapon launchers, military buildings, a Hezbollah weapons depot and other buildings. The IDF also said that a school building in Tayr Harfa was also destroyed in its strike.
- Hezbollah fired 25 rockets at Kiryat Shmona, causing no casualties or major damage.
- Hezbollah claimed its fighters repelled Israeli soldiers who "infiltrated" in the vicinity of a UNIFIL post in Labboune, a village along the Israel-Lebanon border.
- Israeli Prime Minister Benjamin Netanyahu claimed that an Israeli airstrike killed Hashem Safieddine.
- The IDF said that 50 Hezbollah militants, including six commanders of the group's Southern Front, were killed in airstrikes the day prior.
- An Israeli airstrike on an apartment in Damascus reportedly targeting a senior member of Hezbollah's Unit 4400 killed ten civilians and three combatants, including two Hezbollah members, and injured over ten others.
- Israeli airstrikes were reported in Dahieh after the IDF ordered citizens near two buildings in the suburb to evacuate.
- Hezbollah fired 180 rockets at northern Israel.

=== 9 October ===
- Hezbollah claimed to have clashed with Israeli forces as they tried to infiltrate Blida.
- Three Israeli soldiers were injured while fighting in Lebanon.
- An Israeli airstrike in Sidon killed a Lebanese man and injured several others including a Lebanese woman, her daughter and her granddaughter.
- Hezbollah claimed to have repelled Israeli soldiers in Naqoura and Labbouneh. It also launched a huge barrage of rockets from southern Lebanon to Israel.
- Hezbollah said that it targeted Israeli soldiers in the south of Maroun al-Ras using rockets.
- The IDF said that the IAF struck about 185 Hezbollah targets including buildings, rocket launchers and fighters by dropping bombs using fighter jets and drones, while its soldiers engaged in close-quarters ground fighting in Lebanon.
- A Syrian security officer was killed and another was injured in an Israeli airstrike near Quneitra.
- Hezbollah fired 40 rockets at Haifa, causing a blackout in Kiryat Bialik and injuring five people.
- A Hezbollah rocket attack killed a man and a woman in Kiryat Shmona. Kiryat Shmona municipality asked residents to leave the city.
- Hezbollah said that it launched rockets and artillery shells towards Israeli soldiers trying to advance in Meiss Ej Jabal from several directions, adding that "clashes are ongoing".
- The IDF's Combat Intelligence Collection Corps 636th unit conducted drone strikes in southern Lebanon. One of the fatalities from the strikes was a Hezbollah company commander.
- Hezbollah fired 90 rockets at the Upper Galilee, striking Safed and nearby communities.
- The Turkish Navy arrived at the port of Beirut to evacuate Turkish citizens and give humanitarian aid to Lebanon.
- The Red Crescent said that it provided a “shipment of essential primary health care consumables and emergency medicines” to the Syrian Ministry of Health for supporting health activities at medical points along the Syrian-Lebanese border.
- The Lebanese Army arrested two Syrian nationals suspected of spying for Israel.
- An Israeli strike in Wardaniyeh, Lebanon killed at least five people and injured 12 others.
- The IDF ordered Haret Hreik residents to evacuate from a distance of 500 metres from a building which it claimed as infrastructure of Hezbollah.
- An Israeli strike in Tyre killed five paramedics.
- SANA reported that Israeli airstrikes on a car assembly plant in Hassia in Homs Governorate and a Syrian army site in the vicinity of Hama caused "material damage".
- An Israeli soldier was killed and another soldier was injured while fighting in Lebanon.

=== 10 October ===
- The Lebanese Health Ministry announced that at least 60 people were killed and 168 others were injured in Israeli attacks.
- The IDF claimed to have killed Hezbollah commanders Ahmed Mustafa Allhaj Ali and Muhammad Ali Hamdan in airstrikes in southern Lebanon. The IDF said that Ali was responsible for launching hundreds of rockets and antitank missiles towards Kiryat Shmona while Hamdan was responsible for firing missiles towards northern Israel.
- The IDF said that approximately 40 rockets were fired from Lebanon towards Upper Galilee and northern Israel. A building was damaged in Margaliot.
- The IDF said that its soldiers supported by dozens of air strikes were pushing on with their ground incursion in Lebanon. It also said that its fighter jets struck over 110 targets in Lebanon and reported “face-to-face encounters” with Hezbollah soldiers and destroying antitank missile launchers and rockets targeting northern Israel.
- An Israeli man born in the US was arrested by Lebanese security forces in Dahieh on suspicion of spying. He was later freed and deported to the US after pressure from the US government.
- Hezbollah said that its fighters launched a “large rocket salvo” to Kiryat Shmona, while other rocket barrages and strikes targeted a site along the border and Israeli soldiers in Beit Hillel and Maayan Baruch. Two Israeli civilians were slightly injured by sharpnel.
- Israeli soldiers opened fire at three UNIFIL positions in southern Lebanon including its main base in Naqoura, injuring two peacekeepers.
- An Israeli airstrike in central Beirut reportedly targeting Wafic Safa, the chief of Hezbollah's Liaison and Coordination Unit, killed at least 22 people and injured 117 others. Safa reportedly survived.

=== 11 October ===
- Israeli police detained Jeremy Loffredo, an American journalist and four other journalists under the charges including "aiding the enemy during wartime and providing information to the enemy" for reporting landing of Iranian missiles including in Nevatim Airbase and an intelligence base. A Russian journalist among them accused the IDF of beating him.
- The Iranian Red Crescent Society said that the IDF destroyed a field hospital marked with Red Crescent flags along the Syrian-Lebanese border as well as its equipment, supplies and ambulances.
- A drone was launched towards Lakhish.
- Another Israeli attack injured several peacekeepers in the UNIFIL headquarters in Naqoura. The IDF said that UN peacekeepers were "inadvertently hurt" while fighting with Hezbollah.
- Approximately 25 rockets and two UAVs were launched from Lebanon towards Israel.
- A Thai foreign worker was killed and another was injured by a fallen munition in Yir'on.
- The IDF announced that it killed the commander of the Redwan Force's anti-tank missile unit.
- Hezbollah said that its fighters launched a drone strike targeting an IDF base in Kiryat Elizer, a gathering of Israeli soldiers in the Zovolon area, north of Haifa and Kafrsold using rockets and "al-Abad" site using missiles. It claimed to have shelled Yaftah barracks and its surroundings.
- The IDF said that 100 rockets were launched in two waves from Lebanon towards northern Israel within an hour. It also said that it fired at Hezbollah launchers used to fire rockets. Hezbollah said that it targeted a gathering of Israeli soldiers in Kiryat Shmona and Kfar Yuval using rockets, Safed using missiles and soldiers in the vicinity of an IDF barracks in the Golan Heights using rockets.
- An Israeli strike hit a Lebanese Army post in southern Lebanon, killing two soldiers and injuring three others.
- Two drones from Lebanon were launched at Herzliya, with one hitting a retirement home and the other being intercepted. Hezbollah claimed responsibility for the attack.
- Hezbollah warned Israelis to stay away from IDF sites in residential areas in northern Israel.
- German government demanded clarification from Netanyahu government after an Israeli airstrike on Dar es Salaam meeting centre in Lebanon which is supported by German organisations killed at least six people.
- A UAV launched from Syria entered the Golan Heights.
- The US government expanded sanctions on Iranian oil and petrochemical industry by imposing new sanctions as a response to the October 2024 Iranian strikes against Israel.
- A UNIFIL peacekeeper was injured by unknown gunfire in Naqoura.
- An IDF reservist of the Alexandroni Brigade's 9203rd Battalion was seriously injured during combat in southern Lebanon.

=== 12 October ===
- The Lebanese Health Ministry announced that at least 51 people were killed in Israeli attacks.
- Hezbollah said that it launched seven strikes on Israeli positions. It claimed that its “qualitative missiles” hit an IDF base used for making weapons south of Haifa, artillery shells hit Israeli soldiers in the vicinity of the Lebanon border, targeted Ramia site with “guided missiles” and hit other Israeli positions with multiple rocket salvoes.
- A rocket was launched by Hezbollah from Lebanon towards central Galilee.
- The IDF threatened to target ambulances in southern Lebanon, accusing Hezbollah of misusing them for transporting fighters and weapons. An IDF spokesperson alleged that intelligence revealed that “Hezbollah elements are using ambulances to transport fighters and arms” and any vehicle carrying armed elements including fighters and vehicles would be at risk.
- The IDF ordered residents of another 22 towns and villages in southern Lebanon including Aita al-Shaab, Ramyah and Hanine to evacuate to north of the Awali River.
- Approximately 32 rockets were launched by Hezbollah towards Israel.
- Approximately 35 rockets were launched from Lebanon towards Acre, slightly injuring two people at the Mak'r intersection.
- The IDF said that entering Zerait, Shomara, Shtula, Natua and Eben Menachem is "strictly prohibited” after announcing them as closed military zones.
- The IDF announced that around 320 projectiles from Lebanon were launched at Israel during Yom Kippur.
- Forty rockets were launched from Lebanon towards Upper Galilee.
- The United States deployed THAAD missile defense systems to Israel in anticipation of an Iranian response to the planned Israeli retaliation for the 1 October strikes.

=== 13 October ===
- Hezbollah fighters inflicted casualties on Israeli forces who tried to "infiltrate" Ramyah by detonating an explosive device and clashing in gun battles. It also said that fighting is continuing around the village. The Quds News Network reported that “at least seven” Israeli soldiers were injured.
- Approximately 300 rockets were launched from Lebanon to northern Israel in past 24 hours.
- Five rockets were launched from Lebanon towards Haifa.
- The Red Crescent Society of Iran announced a fourth aid consignment containing three tonnes of medical supplies that arrived in Lebanon.
- The IDF said that it struck over 200 Hezbollah targets in Lebanon including rocket launchers, anti-tank positions, weapon depots, and other infrastructure in the past 24 hours.
- Israeli aircraft bombed and destroyed an old mosque in Kfar Tebnit, while another aircraft bombed an empty apartment complex in Sidon.
- An Israeli airstrike in Sarbin injured four Lebanese Red Crescent paramedics.
- Hezbollah said that its rockets targeted Zabadin barracks in Shebaa Farms and its artillery targeted a gathering of Israeli soldiers in Maroun al-Ras.
- The IDF said that 25 soldiers of the Etzioni Brigade were injured, including two critically, while fighting in southern Lebanon including in Kafr Kila and Odaisseh.
- The IDF claimed to have captured a Hezbollah operative with weapons and supplies for interrogation from a tunnel in southern Lebanon after his surrender.
- Israeli prime minister Benjamin Netanyahu asked UN secretary-general Antonio Guterres to move UNIFIL peacekeepers in Lebanon "immediately".
- The IDF ordered residents of 21 villages in Lebanon to evacuate to areas north of the Awali River.
- Hezbollah said that it targeted Kiryat Shmona with rockets. Hezbollah also claimed that its missiles hit an IDF base in Tzurit.
- Approximately 115 rockets and other projectiles were launched by Hezbollah from Lebanon towards Israel.
- Hezbollah alleged that the IDF used cluster bombs for bombing the area between the towns of Hanine and Tayri.
- UNIFIL said that Israeli forces crossed the Blue Line and destroyed one of its main base gates. It added that 15 peacekeepers suffered effects including skin irritation and gastrointestinal reactions from smoke attributed to the IDF's use of "what appeared to be an attack with some sort of chemical agent" approximately 100 metres north of their position. The IDF said that its tank entered the base while evacuating its wounded soldiers.
- A drone attack launched by Hezbollah hit the Zar'it military barracks in the vicinity of Binyamina-Giv'at Ada killing four Israeli soldiers and injuring at least 61 others, seven of them seriously.
- Hezbollah claimed that its missile targeted the IDF's Tsnobar logistics base in the Golan Heights.
- Another drone was launched from Lebanon to the northern coast of Israel.
- The Israeli Home Front Command said that sirens sounded in Kiryat Shmona, Margaliot, Metula, Misgav Am and Manara.
- Five projectiles were launched from Lebanon towards the "Gulf area".
- Israeli strikes in Nabatieh destroyed a market which dates back to 1910.

=== 14 October ===
- The Lebanese Health Ministry announced that at least 41 people were killed in Israeli attacks.
- Hezbollah said that it targeted an Israeli infantry force trying to "infiltrate" Lebanese territory through Markaba using artillery shells. Its missiles also targeted Israeli forces in Labbouneh.
- The IDF claimed that Hezbollah launched 25 rockets from the vicinity of UNIFIL peacekeeping posts.
- Ten rocket were launched by Hezbollah towards Haifa.
- Projectiles were launched from Lebanon towards central Israel.
- Several rockets fired from Lebanon fell along with shrapnel in Karmiel.
- Hezbollah claimed that its fighters killed or injured Israeli soldiers by targeting an armoured personnel carrier using a guided missile in Aita al-Shaab. It also said that it engaged in fighting with Israeli soldiers in the village.
- Several projectiles were launched from Lebanon towards central Israel for the second time.
- Hezbollah said that it launched a "big rocket salvo" towards Safed.
- The IDF reported "targeted operational activity" against more than 200 targets in Lebanon, including militant cells, missile posts and launchers.
  - The IDF claimed to have killed Muhammad Kamal Naim, the commander of the antitank system of the Radwan Force in an air strike. It also said that he was responsible for planning and carrying out many attacks on Israel including launching an antitank missile.
  - An Israeli airstrike on an apartment building in Aitou in northern Lebanon killed at least 21 people including twelve women and two children and injured eight others. The strike reportedly targeted Ahmad Fakih who rented an apartment in the town.

=== 15 October ===
- Hezbollah said that it targeted Israeli soldiers operating in Khallet Wardeh, Marj, al-Sadana and Birkat al-Naqqar.
- The IDF said that it struck about 200 Hezbollah targets in the past 24 hours and killed “dozens of Hezbollah elements”.
- Hezbollah targeted Haifa using two surface-to-surface ballistic missiles.
- An Israeli air strike on a house in al-Sharaik neighbourhood in Iqlim al-Tuffah area of Jarjouh killed four people including a Lebanese woman and her two children.
- UNICEF said that 400,000 children were displaced and 1.2 million children were unable to get education in Lebanon within three weeks.
- Over 25% of Lebanon was under evacuation orders of Israel.
- The IDF announced that an airstrike in Nabatieh several days ago killed Khader Al-Abed Bahja, the head of Hezbollah's aerial unit in the northern Litani region.
- The IDF announced that it captured three Redwan fighters from a tunnel underneath a building in southern Lebanon.
- Israeli air strikes in Qana killed 15 people and injured 15 others.
- An Israeli air strike in Riyaq killed five people including three children and injured at least 15 others.
- Hezbollah claimed to have destroyed two Merkava tanks and three IDF bulldozers and inflicted casualties on Israeli soldiers in the Ramyah area.
- The IDF said that Hezbollah launched about 95 projectiles from Lebanon towards Israel.
- Two Hezbollah drones launched from Lebanon fell in Israeli territory.

=== 16 October ===
- The Lebanese Health Ministry announced that at least 27 people were killed in Israeli attacks in the past 24 hours.
- The IDF said that approximately 50 projectiles were launched from Lebanon towards Upper Galilee. Hezbollah said that its fighters carried out four rocket strikes targeting Safed, Dalton, Dishon and Yiftah and two of those strikes targeted Israeli artillery positions.
- The IDF warned residents to move at least 500 metres away from a building in Haret Hreik. The IAF later conducted a strike against the building, saying that it was a storage facility that contained Hezbollah weapons.
- The IDF said that it struck 140 Hezbollah targets one day prior.
- Hezbollah claimed that it shot down an Israeli drone.
- An Israeli airstrike on the municipal building of Nabatieh killed at least 16 people, including the town's mayor Ahmad Kahil and injured 52 others. The IDF said that it targeted Hezbollah infrastructure.
- The IDF said that its navy hit dozens of Hezbollah targets in southern Lebanon in coordination with soldiers on the ground.
- The IDF said that its 8th Reserve Brigade and the Yahalom combat engineering unit destroyed a Redwan tunnel and bunker network in southern Lebanon.
- Hezbollah claimed to have hit a gathering of Israeli soldiers in Maskaf Am using artillery shells and Karmiel using rockets.
- Four people were lightly injured by shrapnel after Hezbollah fired 30 rockets at the Galilee.
- Two Lebanese Red Cross ambulance workers were injured by shrapnel after an Israeli strike in Jwaya.
- An Israeli Merkava tank fired at a UNIFIL watchtower in Kafr Kila in the morning, causing damage.
- Fierce clashes were reported between the IDF and Hezbollah around several towns in the central section of the Israel-Lebanon border.
- Hezbollah said that it targeted a gathering of Israeli soldiers in Khallet Warda using a rocket.
- Hezbollah fired rockets at Kiryat Shmona, impacting several locations including a building.
- Hezbollah claimed that its fighters killed or injured the crew of an Israeli tank in Labbouneh Heights by targeting it using an antitank missile.

=== 17 October ===
- The Lebanese Health Ministry announced that at least 45 people were killed in Israeli attacks in the past 24 hours.
- SANA reported that the IDF struck Latakia. It also reported that "anti-aircraft defence intercepted hostile targets” and fire erupted after the attack. The Syrian Observatory for Human Rights reported that it "targeted a weapons depot”.
- Hezbollah said that it fired a barrage of rockets towards Safed and targeted an IDF base to the east of Netanya with Nasr 1 guided surface-to-surface missile. It also released a video of an Israeli tank engulfed by fire after the attack.
- A German warship intercepted a drone off the coast of Lebanon.
- Hezbollah claimed that it struck two Merkava tanks with guided missiles near Labbouneh.
- Israeli soldiers raised the Israeli flag in the vicinity of a monument in Labbouneh.
- At least 100 Hezbollah targets were struck one day prior.
- Approximately 30 rockets were launched towards Upper Galilee. Hezbollah said that it targeted a gathering of Israeli soldiers in al-Sadana, Shebaa Farms.
- The IDF struck Tamnine Al Tahta in the Bekaa Valley and ordered residents of nearby Saraain al-Tahta to evacuate from their houses.
- Five Israeli soldiers were killed and an IDF officer and two soldiers were critically wounded while fighting in south Lebanon. Nine other Israeli soldiers were also critically wounded while fighting in south Lebanon and the Gaza Strip.
- Israeli soldiers detonated several explosives in Muhajbib, demolishing most of the historic village. The IDF said that it destroyed a Redwan tunnel network in the center of the village.

=== 18 October ===
- The IDF claimed to have killed Hezbollah commander Mohammad Hussein Ramal in an air strike in Taybeh. It also said that it located and destroyed rocket launchers aimed for attacking northern Israel and its soldiers uncovered Hezbollah weapons in southern Lebanon. The IAF also struck a militant cell saying that they were preparing to launch an antitank missile towards Israeli soldiers operating in southern Lebanon.
- The IDF said that its air force conducted approximately 150 strikes on sites in the Gaza and Lebanon one day prior including munitions warehouses, rocket launch sites, and sniper and observation posts, and killed dozens of militants.
- Seventy-five projectiles were launched by Hezbollah from Lebanon towards Israel, including 20 rockets. Some of them targeted the Philon IDF Base in Rosh Pinna, an air missile defence base east of Hadera, a gathering of soldiers in Safed, and an area north of Haifa.
- The IDF announced that it killed 60 Hezbollah fighters during combat in southern Lebanon the day prior.
- Three rockets targeting Haifa Bay were intercepted by the IDF.
- An Israeli reservist of the Alon Brigade's 5030th Battalion who was critically injured during combat in southern Lebanon on 9 October died from his wounds, bringing the IDF death toll since the start of invasion of Lebanon to 22.

=== 19 October ===
- The Lebanese Health Ministry announced that at least 36 people were killed in Israeli attacks in the past 48 hours.
- The Lebanese Health Ministry announced that at least 16 people were killed in Israeli attacks in the past 24 hours.
- A drone launched from Syria crashed in the northern Golan Heights.
- Three drones were launched from Lebanon towards Israel, one of which hit Benjamin Netanyahu's residence in Caesarea. Hezbollah claimed responsibility for the attack.
- One hundred rockets were launched from Lebanon towards northern Israel, damaging a residential building in Shlomi. Hezbollah said that it launched rockets towards a region north of Haifa. A person died and at least 13 people were injured in the rocket strikes. Hezbollah also said that it targeted an IDF base in Nesher, Kiryat Shmona and a group of Israeli soldiers in al-Marj and Zarit.
- The IDF said that it killed Nasser Abd al-Aziz Rashid, deputy commander of Hezbollah's operations in Bint Jbeil District. It also added that its forces located and destroyed stockpiles of weapons in southern Lebanon.
- The IDF issued evacuation orders for residents in Haret Hreik and Bourj el-Barajneh.
- An Israeli air strike on a residential apartment in Baaloul killed four people including the mayor of Sohmor, Haidar Shahla, and injured several others.
- The IDF said that it targeted Hezbollah's intelligence command centre and several munitions warehouses in several locations in the southern suburbs of Beirut.
- An explosive laden-drone critically injured an IDF officer in southern Lebanon.
- A Hezbollah member captured in southern Lebanon died in the custody of Israeli soldiers.
- Approximately 200 projectiles were launched by Hezbollah towards Israel.
- An Israeli reserve soldier died of injuries he had sustained in an October 9 clash with Hezbollah fighters in Lebanon, increasing the number of Israeli soldiers killed as a result of that clash to two.

=== 20 October ===
- The IDF issued evacuation order for residents to move at least 500 metres away from at least two buildings in Haret Hreik and Hadath. It also issued evacuation orders for some areas in the east of Lebanon for the first time in a week.
- The IDF said that its air force struck 175 militant targets in Gaza and Lebanon, striking weapons warehouses, rocket launch sites and other Hamas and Hezbollah infrastructure. It also said that it intercepted a "suspicious aerial target" off the coast of Haifa.
- The IDF claimed to have killed key Hezbollah officials Elhag Abbas Salameh, Racha Abbas Icha, and Ahmed Ali Hasin in its strike on Hezbollah intelligence headquarters in southern Beirut. It also said that it hit an underground weapons workshop in Beirut. It also claimed to have killed Alhaj Abbas Salameh, a senior figure in the Hezbollah's southern command, Radja Abbas Awache, a Hezbollah communications expert and Ahmad Ali Hussein, who was responsible for development of Hezbollah's strategic weapons, in airstrikes.
- At least 160 rockets were launched from Lebanon to Israel. Rockets were launched to places in northern Israel including areas in Safed, Haifa, Acre and Margaliot. Hezbollah said that it targeted an IDF base in the vicinity of Safed and Shebaa Farms.
- Israeli forces bombed a vehicle belonging to the Lebanese Armed forces on a road between Ain Ebel and Hanine in Bint Jbeil District, killing three soldiers. The IDF subsequently apologised, saying that they had been mistaken for militants.
- Hezbollah said that it launched rockets towards Israeli soldiers in the outskirts of Markaba and west of Odaisseh.
- The IDF destroyed several villages in southern Lebanon including Ramyah, razing its homes and mosques.
- The IDF demolished a UNIFIL observation tower and perimeter fence in Marwahin.
- Several Israeli airstrikes targeted branches of the Hezbollah-linked Al-Qard Al-Hasan Association bank in Beirut and the Beqaa Valley. One strike hit in close proximity to Beirut–Rafic Hariri International Airport.
- Hezbollah claimed that its air defense unit shot down an Israeli Hermes 450 drone.

=== 21 October ===
- Hezbollah fired rockets towards an Israeli artillery position in Odem, Kiryat Shmona, targeted Israeli forces in al-Malkiyeh IDF site, an IDF base in Beit Lahiya and targeted Israeli forces in Khalet Warda and Mizra. It also said that it targeted Israel soldiers operating in Maroun al-Ras.
- About 170 projectiles were launched by Hezbollah from Lebanon to Israel.
- The IDF said that it hit approximately 15 short-range Hezbollah rocket launchers in southern Lebanon. It also said some of those launchers were used for recent attacks in northern Israel and added that it hit buildings used by Hezbollah in various areas of southern Lebanon.
- Shrapnel from a Hezbollah rocket attack lightly injured a man in Ayelet HaShahar.
- Five drones were launched from Lebanon to Israel.
- Syrian state media reported that an Israeli guided missile attack on a car in Mezzeh killed at least two people and injured three others. The IDF said that it killed the commander of a Hezbollah unit responsible for the transfer of weapons from Iran.
- An Israeli air strike on a building in Baalbek killed six people including a child.
- Hezbollah launched a "large missile barrage" towards Yoav IDF camp in the Golan Heights. Israeli Home Command said that sirens sounded in Margaliot and Manara.
- The Israeli Broadcasting Authority reported a suspected hack at the port database of Haifa.
- Hezbollah said that it targeted an IDF intelligence base in the suburbs of Tel Aviv.
- An Israeli airstrike in Kharayeb killed four people.
- Israeli airstrikes killed four paramedics in Babliyeh and one each in Khirbet Selm, Bir el-Sanasel and Deir Ez Zahrani.
- An Israeli airstrike near the Rafik Hariri University Hospital in Beirut killed at least 18 people, including four children, and injured at least 60 others.

=== 22 October ===
- The Lebanese government reported that at least 63 people were killed in Israeli attacks in Lebanon in the past 24 hours.
- Israel said it struck over 230 militant targets in Gaza and Lebanon in the past 24 hours.
- A barrage of rockets were launched towards Beit Aryeh-Ofarim. Hezbollah claimed to have hit the Nirit area in the suburbs of Tel Aviv. A state of emergency was declared in Tel Aviv.
- Hezbollah claimed to have hit the Glilot base of Unit 8200 in the suburbs of Tel Aviv using missiles.
- Hezbollah also launched medium-range rockets at Haifa. It claimed to have hit Stella Maris naval base, northwest of Haifa. Hezbollah also launched missiles towards an area north of Caesarea.
- Falling interceptor fragments injured a man in Ma'agan Michael and damaged a residential building and several cars in the same area.
- Sixteen Israeli soldiers were injured while fighting in Lebanon.
- The IDF said that it struck a Hezbollah naval base in Beirut used to store fast boats, carry out tests and train naval forces. It added that its other attacks hit weapons depots, command centres and other infrastructure. It also said that some of them were underground targets.
- Hezbollah fired ten rockets at Neot Mordechai, killing an Israeli reservist from the 7338th "Adirim" Artillery Brigade's 508th battalion and seriously injuring three other reservists.
- Hezbollah said that its rocket strike targeted Israeli soldiers gathered in the west of Odaisseh. It also said that it targeted Hatzor using rockets.
- The IDF issued evacuation orders for residents to move at least 500 metres away from two buildings in Ghobeiry.
- The IAF said that it struck ten Hezbollah command and control centers in Al Housh, southern Lebanon within the past 24 hours.
- An Israeli strike in Nabatieh injured three paramedics.
- Hezbollah confirmed that some of its fighters were captured by the IDF.
- An Israeli major (res.) who served as the deputy commander of the Alon Brigade's 9308th battalion was killed during combat in southern Lebanon.
- The IDF confirmed the killing of Hashem Safieddine and 23 other members of Hezbollah's intelligence unit in an airstrike in Dahieh on 3 October after their bodies were reportedly found in the bunker that was struck. Hezbollah also confirmed his death.
- Approximately 140 projectiles were launched from Lebanon by Hezbollah towards Israel. Hezbollah said that it launched kamikaze drones towards Eliakim IDF base south of Haifa.
- An Israeli airstrike on a house in Teffahta killed 19 people.
- Hezbollah drone attack on Israel sends a million people to shelters.

=== 23 October ===
- The Lebanese government reported that at least 28 people were killed in Israeli attacks in Lebanon in the past 24 hours.
- Hezbollah said that it targeted an IDF intelligence base in the suburbs of Tel Aviv.
- The IDF launched strikes on area in Tyre centered around two buildings. The IDF said that it targeted Hezbollah command and control complexes, including the headquarters of the Southern Front Unit used to attack Israeli citizens and forces without offering evidence.
- The IDF said that it killed three Hezbollah sector commanders and 70 other Hezbollah militants. It also claimed to have killed Khalil Muhammad Amhaz, an expert in the Hezbollah air unit responsible for designing its kamikaze drones and reconnaissance drones.
- An Israeli air strike on a vehicle in Nabatieh killed an Iranian medic.
- Approximately 135 rockets and five drones were launched from Lebanon to Israel.
- A man was moderately injured by shrapnel in Nahariya during a Hezbollah barrage of 25 rockets.
- Hezbollah said that its fighters launched kamikaze drones containing explosives towards an IDF base south of Haifa.
- Four projectiles were launched from Lebanon towards central Israel, three of which were intercepted or hit open areas. Hezbollah later claimed that it struck a military industries company in the suburbs of Tel Aviv using rockets.
- Hezbollah said that it forced Israeli soldiers to retreat when they attempted to "infiltrate" from the outskirts of Aitarun.
- Hezbollah claimed that it had killed over 70 Israeli soldiers.
- Israeli prime minister Benjamin Netanyahu claimed that Hezbollah prepared an "invasion" of Israel.
- An Israeli airstrike destroyed an office of the Hezbollah-linked broadcaster Al Mayadeen in Beirut, killing one person and injuring five others.
- A Palestinian was lightly injured either by a rocket from Lebanon or an Israeli interceptor missile in Ras Atiya.
- Israeli forces conducted three raids on Khiam.
- Four reservists of the Carmeli Brigade's 222nd Battalion were killed and six others were injured, three seriously, after they were ambushed by Hezbollah fighters with grenades in southern Lebanon.

=== 24 October ===
- Hezbollah launched approximately 120 rockets towards Israel.
- The Syrian defence ministry and SANA reported that Israeli strikes on a residential building in Kafr Sousa and a military site in Homs Governorate killed a soldier and wounded seven others.
- An Israeli strike during the evacuation of injured people from the outskirts of Yater killed three Lebanese soldiers, including an officer.
- The IAF said that it killed dozens of militants over the past day, struck over 160 Hezbollah targets including launchers, military buildings and military infrastructure throughout Lebanon and “eliminated" several militant squads using aerial strikes. The IDF also claimed that its 98th division located ammunition depots containing hundreds of antitank missiles and mortar bombs.
- The IDF said that it struck several Hezbollah weapons storage facilities and weapons factories in its overnight strikes in Dahieh.
- Rocket shrapnel moderately injured two people and lightly injured two others in Western Galilee. Hezbollah claimed multiple strikes including launching rockets towards Safed and Nahariya and targeted Zevulon military industries base north of Haifa with rockets.
- Israel asked approximately 25 towns in the Upper Galilee to limit movements, avoid gatherings and stay in the vicinity of protected zones.
- An Israeli strike on a car in the vicinity of Aley killed at least one person.
- Hezbollah claimed to have killed Israeli soldiers after a firefight in Ayta ash Shab, destroyed a Merkava tank which tried to provide support and hit another Merkava. It also claimed multiple rocket strikes targeting a gathering of Israeli soldiers in Misgav Am and Manara, Kiryat Shmona, and a logistical base affiliated with the IDF Northern Command between Nahariya and Acre.
- Hezbollah fired five rockets at Karmiel, with shrapnel from an intercepted rocket lightly injuring an elderly man. It also claimed that it forced Israeli soldiers advancing in the vicinity of Odaisseh to retreat following clashes.
- Two Israeli officers were seriously injured in separate incidents in southern Lebanon. In a third incident, a commander of the Oketz Unit was killed and a reservist from the 55th Paratroopers Brigade's 7155th Battalion was seriously injured during a clash with Hezbollah members.
- Hezbollah said it destroyed an IDF tank in Aita al-Shaab using a guided missile and claimed that it killed and injured its crew. It also said its fighters engaged in intense” clashes at “point-blank range” with assault weapons and rocket-propelled grenades against IDF vehicles in Aita al-Shaab.
- Israeli strikes hit an area in the southern suburbs of Beirut.
- Five reservists of the IDF's 8th Armored Brigade's 89th Battalion, including its deputy commander, were killed and 24 others were injured, four seriously, when a Hezbollah rocket struck a building in southern Lebanon.

=== 25 October ===
- The Lebanese Health Ministry reported that at least 41 people were killed in Israeli attacks in Lebanon in the past 24 hours.
- An apparent Israeli targeted strike on a compound where journalists were housed in villas in Hasbaiyya killed three journalists. Two of them were staff members of the Hezbollah linked news television channel Al Mayadeen, and the third person killed was a staff member of the Hezbollah linked television station Al-Manar TV. Three others were injured.
- The IDF claimed that its fighter jets killed Abbas Adnan Maslam, a Redwan force commander in Aitaroun responsible for execution of many shooting plans targeting IDF and settlements in northern Israel. It also claimed that it struck approximately 200 militant targets in Lebanon.
- An Israeli soldier was seriously injured in southern Lebanon.
- An Israeli airstrike disabled the Qaa crossing on the Lebanon–Syria border.
- Israeli combat engineers from the Carmeli Brigade destroyed two Hezbollah tunnels in southern Lebanon.
- Lebanese Health Minister Firass Abiad said that 163 rescuers and health workers were killed and 273 others were injured in Lebanon since the start of the Israel-Hezbollah conflict.
- A Hezbollah rocket attack in Shomera injured six Israeli soldiers.
- Hezbollah claimed that it inflicted casualties on Israeli forces advancing towards Marwahin with anti-armour guided missiles. It added that it struck a Merkava tank with another guided missile and claimed that it killed and injured its crew. It said that it fired multiple rocket barrages at Israeli settlements along the border and said that it targeted an IDF base south of Haifa with missiles.
- A leaked UNIFIL report accused the IDF of attacking UN positions 12 times. It also accused the IDF of using white phosphorus against peacekeepers.
- Hezbollah fired 30 rockets targeting Karmiel. Two civilians were killed and seven others were injured, one critically and one seriously, when a rocket hit a market in the nearby city of Majd al-Krum.
- The IDF said that it struck Hezbollah weapons production facilities, an intelligence headquarters and air defence capabilities in its air strikes in Beirut.
- Hezbollah said that it fired a rocket salvo towards Safed. It also said that its fighters launched an air strike using a swarm of explosives containing drones towards an IDF base situated in the east of the same area.
- Hezbollah claimed that it inflicted injuries by targeting an Israeli force of 12 soldiers using a guided missile in the outskirts of Odaisseh. It also said that it struck a Hummer IDF vehicle with four soldiers.
- Hezbollah fired a total of 65 rockets at northern Israel throughout the day.

=== 26 October ===
- The Lebanese Health Ministry reported that at least 19 people were killed in Israeli attacks in Lebanon one day prior.
- The IDF carried out airstrikes in Iran in response to its attacks against Israel. An Iranian civilian and four Iranian soldiers were killed in the strikes.
- The IDF blew up a large underground complex at Rab Thalathin in Lebanon, that was ready to host 200 Hezbollah militants, and included computerized communications control rooms, supplies for months, ammunition on a battalion scale, RPGs, long-range anti-tank missiles, charges of various sizes, hundreds of rifles, and other tactical equipment.
- The IDF said that its fighter jets struck 70 Hezbollah targets including antitank positions, military buildings, ammunition depots and operatives in the past 24 hours. It also released a footage of its soldiers operating in southern Lebanon attacking Hezbollah operatives and retrieving weapons. A drone containing explosives was launched from Lebanon towards northern Israel.
- Two drones were launched from Lebanon towards Israel.
- The NNA reported that the IDF blew up houses in Odaisseh.
- Hezbollah said that it targeted the Tel Nof airbase south of Tel Aviv with drone strikes. It said that it launched a rocket salvo towards Israeli soldiers on the outskirts of Aita al-Shaab.
- Hezbollah said that its rocket salvo targeted a Meishar base, allegedly an intelligence headquarters for northern Israel.
- Hezbollah launched about 80 projectiles towards Israel.
- Hezbollah said that it launched a rocket salvo towards five residential areas in northern Israel including the outskirts of Krayot.
- An Israeli airstrike on a health centre in Bazouriyeh killed a paramedic affiliated with the Hezbollah-affiliated Islamic Health Committee and injured five others including three paramedics from Islamic Health Committee.
- The IDF eased some restrictions for residents in areas of northern Israel.
- Hezbollah urged residents of at least 25 communities in northern Israel and a few settlements in Golan Heights to evacuate, saying that those places have become “legitimate military targets” after stationing of Israeli forces.
- An elderly woman died after tripping on stairs while evacuating to a bomb shelter in Beit HaEmek.
- The IDF issued evacuation warnings for residents of several buildings in the Burj al-Barajneh and Hadath areas in the southern suburbs of Beirut.
- Five Israeli soldiers of Alon Brigade, including the brigade's rabbi, and three Hezbollah fighters were killed during a battle in southern Lebanon, increasing the IDF death toll in the invasion of Lebanon to 37. Fourteen other soldiers were injured in the same incident, four of them seriously.

=== 27 October ===
- Hezbollah said that it launched a rocket salvo towards Kiryat Shmona.
- Two drones were launched from Lebanon entered Israel.
- The IDF said that its fighter jets struck Hezbollah weapons warehouses and sites used for the manufacturing and maintenance of weapons in Dahieh without providing evidence. It also claimed to have killed 70 Hezbollah fighters and struck over 120 Hezbollah positions.
- A drone launched from Lebanon hit the roof of a factory manufacturing aviation components in the industrial area of Bar-Lev in Karmiel, injuring two people. Hezbollah said that its drone strike targeted the "Yudifat military industries company” southwest of Acre.
- Hezbollah claimed that its operatives killed and injured Israeli soldiers by hitting an Israeli infantry group advancing in Hula with a guided missile.
- The IDF issued evacuation orders for residents of 14 towns and villages in southern Lebanon to move to the north of the Awali river.
- Hezbollah said that it launched four more strikes on the IDF and claimed that its drones killed and wounded Israeli soldiers in the vicinity of Manara and Marj.
- Approximately 75 rockets were launched from Lebanon towards northern Israel. One rocket hit the ground injuring three people in Tamra, including a woman who was critically injured.
- The IDF said that it killed the commander of Hezbollah's Bint Jbeil division and his successor in two separate airstrikes within 24 hours.
- An Israeli airstrike in Sidon killed nine people and injured 25 others.
- Hezbollah said that its air defence units forced back Israeli warplanes using surface-to-air missiles above western Lebanon.
- An Israeli air strike on a rescue center in Ain Baal killed seven people including a nurse and three paramedics and injured 24 others.

=== 28 October ===
- The Lebanese Health Ministry reported that at least 38 people were killed and 124 others were injured in Israeli attacks in Lebanon one day prior.
- Two IDF officers and a number of Israeli soldiers were killed in Lebanon. The IDF said that over 1200 Hezbollah militants were killed since the start of its ground operation in Lebanon and claimed that Hezbollah maintained only 30% of the rockets it initially had before the conflict.
- An Israeli airstrike in Tyre killed seven people and injured 17 others.
- Hezbollah claimed that a drone hit the Yudifat Military Industries Company southeast of Acre.
- About 115 projectiles were launched by Hezbollah from Lebanon towards Israel.
- Hezbollah claimed that it inflicted casualties and injuries among Israeli soldiers by ambushing two IDF vehicles advancing to the Tal Nahas area on the outskirts of Kafr Kila using machine guns and rockets.
- Israeli airstrikes in the Baalbek region killed at least 60 people including at least two children.
- Two people were killed in an Israeli airstrike on a vehicle in Al-Nizariyah, on the Syrian-Lebanese border.

=== 29 October ===
- Hezbollah elected Naim Qassem as its new Secretary-General.
- Hezbollah fired 50 rockets at Ma'alot-Tarshiha, killing one person.
- A drone from Lebanon hit a bridge at the Nahariya railway station. A second drone was intercepted over the Upper Galilee.
- The IDF said that it destroyed a Hezbollah underground command centre which was built eight metres underground and another bunker used to store half a tonne of explosives during its ground operations in southern Lebanon.
- Eight Austrian peacekeepers were slightly injured when a Hezbollah rocket hit the UNIFIL headquarters in Camp Naqoura, in the vicinity of the Israeli border.
- Nine people were killed and a girl was trapped under rubble in an Israeli airstrike in Haret Saida, southeast of Sidon.
- Israeli defence minister Yoav Gallant claimed that Hezbollah maintained only 20% of the rockets and missiles it initially had before the conflict. Hezbollah denied the claim.
- The IDF announced that Hezbollah's commander in Ayta ash Shab was captured by Israeli forces two weeks prior.
- An Israeli reservist of the 55th Paratroopers Brigade's 7155th Battalion died from injuries sustained during a battle in southern Lebanon on 24 October.
- Israeli tanks reportedly entered the outskirts of Khiam following a wave of heavy air attacks on the village. Hezbollah claimed that it destroyed two tanks with guided missiles and attacked Israeli troops with artillery and rockets southwest of the village.
- An Israeli airstrike in Sarafand killed 10 people and injured 21 others, while a strike near Sidon killed six and injured 37.
- Hezbollah fired approximately 75 rockets at northern Israel throughout the day.

=== 30 October ===
- At least 77 people were killed in Israeli attacks in Lebanon in the past 24 hours.
- Shrapnel from a Hezbollah rocket attack near Metula injured two farmworkers, one seriously.
- The IDF said that it struck over 100 targets in Lebanon including Hezbollah rocket launchers and claimed that it killed dozens of militants one day prior.
- An Israeli drone strike hit a car in Araya area of Baabda District.
- The IDF announced that it killed Mustafa Ahmad Shahadi, the Redwan Force's deputy commander, in an airstrike in Nabatieh.
- The IDF issued evacuation orders for residents of at least eight towns in southern Lebanon to move to the north of the Awali River. Evacuation orders were also issued for residents of Baalbek, Ain Bourday and Douris, after which Israeli fighter jets launched a series of strikes in the al-Asira area of Baalbek, Iaat, Douris and surrounding areas.
- Hezbollah launched at least 60 projectiles from Lebanon towards Israel.
- Israeli airstrikes in Sohmor killed 11 people and injured 15 others.
- The IDF said that it struck fuel depots situated in military complexes of logistical empowerment unit of Hezbollah in Bekaa.
- Hezbollah said that it struck the Ein Shemer Airfield, the Eliakim camp and Shraga base north of Acre with rockets and drones.
- A Hezbollah drone attack injured two people in Hadera.
- The Lebanese Health Ministry announced that Israeli strikes killed 19 people, including eight women, in two towns in Baalbek District.
- A Katyusha rocket targeting Israel hit the Irish peacekeeping base Camp Shamrock in southern Lebanon, causing minor damage.

=== 31 October ===
- At least 45 people were killed in Israeli attacks in Lebanon in the past 24 hours.
- Hezbollah-affiliated al-Manar reported that a drone launched from Lebanon hit its target in Nahariya.
- The IDF claimed that its fighter jets struck approximately 150 Hamas linked targets in Gaza and Hezbollah linked targets in Lebanon including Hezbollah headquarters and rocket launchers. It said that a Hezbollah unit launched a missile towards one of its fighter jets above an area north of Tyre and it responded by destroying the site. It also said that it continued its ground operations in southern Lebanon, destroying militant infrastructures and striking antitank squads.
- The IDF issued evacuation orders for 10 towns and villages in southern Lebanon including Al-Hawsh, Borgholiyeh and Ansar. Later, a series of Israeli airstrikes struck the Al-Hawsh area.
- Israeli forces launched airstrikes in Baalbek District, killing eight people, including two children.
- A Hezbollah barrage of two rockets hit an apple orchard near Metula, killing five agricultural workers including four Thai nationals and seriously injuring one.
- SANA reported that Israeli strikes hit a number of residential buildings in Al-Qusayr, causing “material damage” to its industrial zone and some of its residential neighbourhoods killing 10 people, including civilians. The IDF said that it struck Hezbollah command centers and weapon depots.
- An Israeli airstrike on an Al-Risala Health Ambulance Association vehicle in Zefta killed a paramedic and wounded two others.
- Israeli strikes killed five other medics and injured two others.
- Hezbollah fired 25 projectiles at the Haifa area. Two people were killed and a third was lightly injured near Kiryat Ata.

== November ==
=== 1 November ===
- The Lebanese Health Ministry announced that 30 people were killed in Israeli attacks in Lebanon in the past 24 hours.
- The IDF issued two evacuation orders for residents of Haret Hreik, Bourj el-Barajneh, and Ghobeiry after which a series of Israeli strikes hit the areas.
- The IDF issued two other evacuation orders for residents of three neighbourhoods of Dahieh and an area referred to as the “pond enclosure” after which Israeli strikes hit the areas, killing two people and injuring four others.
- A UAV launched towards Israel was intercepted in Syria.
- An Israeli airstrike on a home in Taraya killed two people including a woman and injured four others.
- A Hezbollah rocket barrage of approximately 30 rockets was launched towards Galilee, causing several injuries.
- Hezbollah claimed to have hit Karmiel and Ma'alot-Tarshiha.
- An Israeli airstrike hit a border crossing on the Lebanon–Syria border, forcing it to close.
- Israeli airstrikes in Baalbek-Hermel Governorate killed 52 people and injured 72 others.
- An Israeli airstrike on a home in Amhaz killed at least 12 people and injured several others.
- Israeli naval forces reportedly captured Hezbollah official Imad Amhaz during a raid in Batroun, south of Tripoli.
- The IDF announced that the commander of Hezbollah's coastal unit and the commander of the unit's artillery division were killed in an airstrike in Tyre.

=== 2 November ===
- The Lebanese Health Ministry announced that 71 people were killed in Israeli attacks in Lebanon a day prior.
- Eleven people were injured in a Hezbollah rocket attack on a building in Tira.
- Rockets launched from Lebanon injured at least 19 people in Hod HaSharon.
- Northern Command commander Ori Gordin was slightly wounded along with several Israeli soldiers after their vehicle overturned during a patrol in Lebanon.
- Hezbollah claimed to have hit Yesod HaMa’ala, Bar Yohai, Birya, Palmachim Airbase, Zevulon military industries base and Krayot using drones and rockets. The IDF said that a factory near Nahariya was struck.
- Hezbollah claimed that it attacked Israeli forces east of Maroun al-Ras and in Safed using rockets.
- The IDF said that it killed Jaafar Khader Faour, a commander of Nasser Brigade rocket unit of Hezbollah in southern Lebanon who was responsible for several attacks on Israel since October 2023.
- Hezbollah launched about 100 rockets from Lebanon towards Israel.
- An Israeli airstrike in Hazmieh killed a Bangladeshi expatriate worker when he entered a coffee shop on his way to work.

=== 3 November ===
- The Lebanese Health Ministry announced that 18 people were killed in Israeli attacks in Lebanon a day prior.
- The IDF said that it killed two key Hezbollah militants from Khiam. It said that its forces from the 91st Division, in coordination with the IAF killed Farouk Amin Alashi, a Hezbollah commander it accused for the responsibility of the execution of many anti-tank and anti-tank missile launching plans towards the settlements in the Galilee panhandle, particularly Metula, as well as Yosef Ahmed Nun, a platoon commander in the Radwan force in Khiam, who issued anti-tank fire targeting Israeli settlements and forces in the Galilee.
- The IDF issued evacuation orders for residents of a building in Duris and its surroundings to move no less than 500 meters. Later, at least three strikes were reported in the area.
- A man died of injuries sustained in a rocket attack in Nahariya on 23 October.
- Hezbollah claimed to have inflicted casualties and injuries among the crew of a Merkava tank in Metula by firing a guided missile.
- An Israeli strike on a health centre in Bazouriyeh killed two paramedics and injured several others.
- An Israeli strike in the vicinity of Burj el-Shemali camp hit UNRWA's premises.
- Hezbollah launched approximately 100 rockets towards Israel.
- The IDF announced that it captured Ali Soleiman al-Assi, an alleged spy for Iran who gathered intelligence on Israeli troops in the Golan Heights, during a raid by the Egoz Unit on his home near Quneitra several months ago.

=== 4 November ===
- The Lebanese Health Ministry announced that 16 people were killed in Israeli attacks in Lebanon a day prior.
- Israeli strikes damaged the Governmental Hospitals in Tebnine and Baalbek and injured at least 10 people.
- The IDF said that IAF jets killed Abu Ali Rida, Hezbollah's commander in Baraachit who was also responsible for planning and conducting rocket and anti-tank missile attacks on Israeli soldiers.
- SANA reported an Israeli strike in the vicinity of Sayyidah Zaynab. The IAF said that it carried out strikes targeting targets of Hezbollah intelligence headquarters in Syria.

=== 5 November ===
- The IDF announced that a soldier of the 932nd Battalion in Nahal Brigade was critically wounded during combat in southern Lebanon a day prior.
- The IDF announced that it killed two Hezbollah militants with dual Asian nationalities who infiltrated Israel during the conflict.
- The NNA reported that the IDF destroyed over 37 towns with approximately 40,000 housing units in southern Lebanon, centred in the area from Naqoura to the outskirts of Khiam. The IDF said that it targeted Hezbollah infrastructure.
- The IDF and Shin Bet claimed to have arrested over 60 PFLP members from the West Bank and Lebanon.
- The IDF withdrew several brigades from southern Lebanon.
- SANA reported an Israeli strike on an industrial zone in Al-Qusayr, Syria. The IDF said that it struck a facility belonging to Hezbollah's munition unit.
- The Lebanese Health Ministry announced that 11 people were killed in Israeli attacks in Lebanon a day prior.
- An Israeli strike on a residential building in Barja killed at least 30 people and injured several others including a woman and her child.

=== 6 November ===
- The Lebanese Health Ministry announced that 37 people were killed in Israeli attacks in Lebanon.
- The IDF issued evacuation orders for residents in some areas of Nabatieh and Bourj el-Barajneh to move at least 500 metres.
- Hezbollah claimed to have wounded the crew of a Merkava tank in Metula by targeting it using a guided missile and killed and injured Israeli soldiers by striking a home in the same area.
- Over 150 rockets were launched by Hezbollah from Lebanon towards Israel, with one striking the area of Ben Gurion Airport and debris damaging a car in Ra'anana. Shrapnel from a Hezbollah rocket barrage in Kfar Masaryk killed an 18-year-old man.
- An Israeli soldier was killed when Hezbollah fired rockets on Avivim, a locality in Israel next to the Lebanon border. Three other soldiers were lightly injured.

=== 7 November ===
- The Lebanese Health Ministry announced that 53 people were killed in Israeli attacks in Lebanon in the past 24 hours.
- Hezbollah announced that an Israeli strike in Bazouriyeh killed an uncle of Hassan Nasrallah alongside his family.
- The IDF said that it conducted over 110 strikes on targets in Lebanon and Gaza one day prior. It also said that fighter jets struck about 20 sites in the Bekaa Valley and north of the Litani River, killing approximately 60 Hezbollah operatives and dozens of sites in other parts of Lebanon. Israeli ground forces also destroyed militant infrastructure including a “rocket launcher used for an attack in central Israel and weapon depots. It also said that its 91st and 36th divisions demolished a Hezbollah military warehouse and a rocket launcher.
- An Israeli airstrike on a car at a checkpoint in Sidon killed three people and injured three Lebanese soldiers and six Malaysian peacekeepers.
- Hezbollah claimed to have killed and wounded members of an Israeli infantry force which attempted to advance towards Yaroun.

=== 8 November ===
- The Lebanese Health Ministry announced that 15 people were killed in Israeli attacks in Lebanon a day prior.
- Hezbollah claimed to have hit Israeli forces in Jal al-Hammar, south of Odaisseh.
- An Israeli air strike on a medical center in Tyre district on the road connecting Deir Qanoun to Ras al-Ain and Naqoura killed a paramedic from Tayr Harfa.
- The NNA reported that the IDF detonated explosives planted inside homes in Yaroun, Aitaroun and Maroun al-Ras "with the aim of destroying residential homes there".
- Hezbollah claimed to have hit Israeli soldiers using missiles in Margaliot and Misgav Am.
- A man was injured after falling from a ladder due to rocket sirens in the Lower Galilee.
- An Israeli airstrike in Aleppo and Idlib injured several Syrian soldiers.
- An Israeli soldier in the Alon Brigade died of injuries sustained in an October 26 clash with Hezbollah fighters in southern Lebanon, in which five other Israeli soldiers were reported killed earlier.
- The IDF issued evacuation orders for residents of an area in Dahieh to move at least 500 metres. Later, at least 14 Israeli air strikes was conducted on the outskirts of Beirut. The IDF said that it struck Hezbollah command headquarters, a weapons production site, and other infrastructure.

=== 9 November ===
- The Lebanese Health Ministry announced that 19 people were killed in Israeli attacks in Lebanon a day prior.
- Israeli fighter jets struck two buildings in Tyre, killing at least nine people, including a pregnant woman and a child and injured 38 others.
- The IDF said that the IAF struck over 50 militant targets in Lebanon and the Gaza Strip in the past 24 hours.
- Hezbollah claimed that its air defence unit shot down an Israeli Elbit Hermes 450 drone using a surface-to-air missile in Lebanese territory.
- Israeli strikes in southern Lebanon killed 11 people including six rescuers affiliated to the Amal Movement and Hezbollah.
- Israeli air strikes in southern suburbs of Beirut extensively damaged some buildings at the Rafik Hariri University in Hadath, Mount Lebanon.
- The NNA reported that Israeli fighter jets struck Jarmash Qald al-Sabaa crossing between eastern Hermel and Syria.

=== 10 November ===
- The Lebanese Health Ministry announced that 53 people were killed in Israeli attacks in Lebanon a day prior.
- An Israeli air strike in Tyre killed a woman and her four disabled siblings.
- IDF spokesperson Avichay Adraee said that burning of Flag of Lebanon by some soldiers was a violation of its orders.
- An Israeli strike on a civil defense centre affiliated to the Islamic Mission Scouts Association in Ras al-Ain, Lebanon killed 15 people and injured two others.
- An Israeli strike on a home in Ain Baal injured five people including civilians.
- An Israeli strike in Srifa caused critical to moderate injuries to several people including civilians and severely damaged a hospital's equipment.
- An Israeli strike on a home in Almat, Jbeil district killed 23 people including seven children and wounded six others.
- An Israeli strike on a civil defence center affiliated with the Islamic Health Authority in Adloun killed three paramedics.
- SANA reported that an Israeli air strike in Sayyidah Zaynab inflicted casualties and injuries. The Syrian Observatory for Human Rights sajd nine people—including a woman, three children, and a Hezbollah commander— were killed and 14 others were injured in an apartment. The Syrian Ministry of Defense reported that the strikes killed seven civilians including women and children and wounded 20 others.
- Civil defence authorities eased restrictions in northern Israel excluding areas closest to the Lebanese border.
- A Hezbollah anti-tank missile attack injured three people in Metula, while a separate rocket attack in Kabri injured three others.
- Israeli prime minister Benjamin Netanyahu reportedly acknowledged for the first time that Israel was behind the pager and walkie-talkie attacks during a cabinet meeting on 10 November. He stated that the operations "were carried out despite the opposition of senior officials in the defense establishment and those responsible for them in the political echelon".
- Hezbollah claimed to have hit Haifa naval base using drones.
- IDF Chief of Staff Herzi Halevi approved an expansion of its ground operation in southern Lebanon.

=== 11 November ===
- The Lebanese Health Ministry announced that 54 people were killed in Israeli attacks in Lebanon a day prior.
- Hezbollah spokesman Mohammad Afif stated that Israel has not managed to capture "a single" village in Lebanon so far during the invasion, he also dismissed the IDF claim of a significant decline of Hezbollah's missile stockpile as "just lies".
- SANA reported an Israeli airstrike in the vicinity of Shinshar.
- Hezbollah launched 165 projectiles at northern Israel. Fifty rockets targeted the Karmiel area, wounding three people including a child in Bi'ina. Another 90 rockets were fired at Haifa Bay, damaging houses and vehicles in Kiryat Ata and injuring four people.
- The IDF issued evacuation orders for residents of 21 towns in southern Lebanon to move to north of the Awali River.
- An Israeli airstrike on a building in Ain Yaaqoub killed at least 14 people, injured 15 others and trapped some people under the rubble.

=== 12 November ===
- The Lebanese Health Ministry announced that 44 people were killed in Israeli attacks in Lebanon a day prior.
- The IDF called on residents in areas of Haret Hreik, Ghobeiry, Lailaki and Hadath to evacuate. Later, at least 13 Israeli air strikes hit the southern suburbs of Beirut.
- The NNA reported that the outskirts of Yater and Zibqin were subjected to artillery shelling using incendiary phosphorus shells.
- Hezbollah claimed that its air defense unit forced an Israeli Elbit Hermes 450 drone to leave Lebanese airspace by confronting it above Nabatieh Governorate.
- The IDF told residents to evacuate from 14 villages in southern Lebanon to the north of the Awali River.
- A Hezbollah drone struck a kindergarten in Nesher, causing slight damage.
- Hezbollah fired a barrage of ten rockets at the Western Galilee, killing two men in Nahariya and injuring two others in Kabri.
- An Israeli air strike in Joun killed 15 people including eight women and four children and wounded 12 others.

=== 13 November ===
- The Lebanese Health Ministry announced that 78 people were killed in Israeli attacks in Lebanon a day prior.
- The NNA reported that Israeli fighter jets conducted a series of strikes in the southern suburbs of Beirut, hitting Dar al-Hawra Medical Centre in Haret Hreik several times after issuing evacuation orders for the area and in Ghobeiry. The IDF said that it struck weapons depots and command headquarters of Hezbollah.
- The IDF issued evacuation orders for areas of Bourj al-Barajneh and Dahieh. Later, Israeli air strikes hit the areas.
- Hezbollah claimed that its air defense unit forced an Israeli Elbit Hermes 450 drone and an Elbit Hermes 900 drone to exit Lebanese airspace by confronting them using surface-to-air missiles.
- Hezbollah claimed that its drones hit Kirya IDF base in Tel Aviv, saying that it was the headquarters of the Israeli war cabinet and general staff, as well as a war management room and the IAF's war control and supervision authority.
- SANA reported that Israeli strikes targeted Al-Qusayr and said that Syrian air defences intercepted "hostile" targets above the Homs countryside and the strikes caused "significant damage". Israel said that it was conducting strikes to decrease the transfer of weapons from Iran via Syria to Hezbollah in Lebanon, which it said had spread to Al-Qusayr.
- Six Israeli soldiers from the Golani Brigade's 51st Battalion were killed and one was injured during a shootout with four Hezbollah fighters in southern Lebanon, who were also killed.
- An Israeli strike in Joun killed Sakina Mansour Kawtharani, a radio journalist of al-Nour, her two children and other members of the family.

=== 14 November ===
- The Lebanese Health Ministry announced that 16 people were killed in Israeli attacks in Lebanon a day prior.
- The IDF issued evacuation orders for areas of Haret Hreik, Bourj al-Barajneh, Chouaifet and Ghobeiry highlighting some buildings saying that they are Hezbollah infrastructure. Later, an Israeli drone strike hit in the vicinity of Rawadat al-Shahedain in Ghobeiry and an Israeli missile strike hit Choueifat. The IDF said that its air strikes targeted weapons storage of Hezbollah.
- The IDF said it have killed 200 Hezbollah militants and destroyed over 140 Hezbollah rocket launchers in the last week. It said that its strikes on offensive capabilities of Hezbollah on 13 November and 12 November killed the operations head of a Hezbollah battalion, the head of a battalion anti-aircraft unit of Hezbollah and a company commander in the Redwan force.
- The IDF said that it struck over 30 Hezbollah sites in Dahieh over the past two days, including command centers and weapon depots.
- Hezbollah claimed to have inflicted casualties on Israeli soldiers in the eastern outskirts of Markaba using a missile.
- The NNA reported that Israeli soldiers and Hezbollah fighters were engaged in violent clashes in the outskirts of Aitaroun towards Ainata and said that there were confirmed casualties among the Israeli soldiers.
- Al Jazeera reported that an Israeli strike in Al-Hebbariyah killed a farmer.
- An Israeli platoon commander of the Golani Brigade's 51st Battalion was killed and two other soldiers were wounded during a shootout in southern Lebanon.
- Two Israeli soldiers were moderately injured in a Hezbollah drone attack on Eliakim.
- At least two unknown gunmen fired around 30 shots toward a UNIFIL patrol near Qalaouiyah after it discovered an ammunition cache, causing no casualties.
- An Israeli airstrike on a civil defense center in Baalbek killed 12 people. A separate strike in the city killed eight, including five women, and injured 27.
- Al Jazeera reported that an Israeli strike in Arabsalim killed six people, including five paramedics.

=== 15 November ===
- The Lebanese Health Ministry announced that 59 people were killed in Israeli attacks in Lebanon a day prior.
- The IDF issued evacuation orders for residents in parts of Ghobeiry and Bourj el-Barajneh. Later, Israeli air raids were reported in the area. The IDF said that it struck targets including Hezbollah command centers. It also claimed to have struck and destroyed a rockets stockpile and 15 launchers in southern Lebanon used for firing projectiles towards central Israel two day prior.
- The IDF claimed to have hit a Hezbollah command centre in Nabatieh Governorate. It said that the IAF hit over 120 Hezbollah targets throughout Lebanon in the past day, including weapons storage facilities, command centres and a large number of rocket launchers used for striking northern Israel.
- A rocket launched from Lebanon to Haifa Bay area hit a construction site, slightly injuring a man. Hezbollah said that it targeted Tira al-Carmel IDF base in southern Haifa.
- A rocket barrage launched from Lebanon towards Haifa area and the Western Galilee injured three male foreign workers.
- The IDF issued evacuation orders for residents of some buildings in Haret Hreik, Hadath, Mount Lebanon and those adjacent to it. Later, two Israeli air raids struck Hadath.
- SANA reported an Israeli strike in Mezzeh.
- Hezbollah claimed to have inflicted casualties among a group of Israeli soldiers by hitting them using a dive bomber.
- Seven Israeli soldiers were injured in southern Lebanon.
- An Israeli air strike destroyed a home in Ain Qana killing five people including a woman and her three children.
- An artillery shell hit a UNIFIL base in Chamaa without exploding, causing minor damage to its gym. Initial reports blamed Israel, however an investigation by the IDF determined that the shell was launched by Hezbollah.

=== 16 November ===
- An Israeli strike in Borj Rahal killed a paramedic and wounded seven others.
- The IDF issued an evacuation order for residents of two buildings in Haret Hreik. Later, an Israeli strike hit the area. The IDF said that its fighter jets under the direction of the intelligence division hit Hezbollah infrastructure.
- The IDF issued evacuation orders for residents in parts of Haret Hreik, Ghobeiry and Burj el-Barajneh. Later, an Israeli air strike hit the southern suburbs of Beirut.
- The IDF issued evacuation orders for residents of Tyre, highlighting 14 buildings. Later, a series of Israeli air strikes hit Tyre.
- An Israeli drone struck a civil defence team in Arnoun-Kfar Tebnit road in Nabatieh Governorate killing at least one paramedic, injuring four others and leaving two paramedics missing.
- Hezbollah claimed that it hit a gathering of Israeli soldiers adjacent to an IDF checkpoint in Avivim with kamikaze drones.
- The IDF said that approximately 80 rockets were launched from Lebanon towards Israel. It also said that it struck over 160 militant targets in Lebanon and Gaza in the past day.
- The NNA reported that Israeli soldiers reached their deepest point in Lebanon by capturing a strategic hill in Chamaa before retreating after intense clashes with Hezbollah fighters. Hezbollah said that its fighters ambushed Israeli soldiers in Chamaa and claimed to have inflicted casualties.
- The IDF announced that a soldier from the Golani Brigade's 13th Battalion was killed during a shootout with a Hezbollah fighter in a building in southern Lebanon. The latter was also killed during the shootout.
- An Israeli strike in al-Khraiba, Baalbek region killed at least six people including three children and injured 11 others including five children.
- Hezbollah claimed to have set an Israeli Merkava tank in Chamaa on fire using a guided missile.
- A Hezbollah rocket barrage hit a synagogue in Haifa. The IDF said that it wounded two civilians. However, Magen David Adom said that it located "no victims" from rocket shrapnel, while five civilians were mildly wounded while rushing to shelter. Hezbollah said that it targeted IDF bases in Haifa and its vicinity.
- An Israeli strike hit a house in Shiyah neighborhood of Beirut, critically injuring a female Lebanese midfielder.
- A rocket launched from Lebanon hit an agricultural area in the vicinity of Tamra killing several animals and heavily damaging buildings and vehicles in the area.

=== 17 November ===
- The Lebanese Health Ministry announced that 29 people were killed in Israeli attacks in Lebanon a day prior.
- The IDF issued evacuation orders for three areas in the southern suburbs of Beirut including Burj el-Barajneh and Chiyah. The NNA reported that Israeli jets destroyed a 12-storey residential building in Chiyah. It also reported Israeli strikes in Burj el-Barajneh and Hadath.
- The IDF issued evacuation orders for areas of Haret Hreik.
- An Israeli strike on a building containing the headquarters of the Lebanese branch of the Ba'ath Party in Ras al-Nabaa neighborhood of Beirut Central District killed Mohammad Afif, media relations chief of Hezbollah. The Lebanese Health Ministry said that a total of seven people were killed including a woman and 16 others were injured including two children in the strike. Hezbollah confirmed that four other members of its media relations department died alongside Afif.
- An Israeli strike hit a Lebanese Army post in al-Mari, Hasbaya District, killing two Lebanese soldiers and injuring three others, one of them seriously.
- An Israeli airstrike on an electronics store in the Mar Elias, Beirut killed three people including a woman and injured 29 others.
- A 13-year-old boy was wounded after Hezbollah fired 15 rockets towards northern Israel.
- Hezbollah claimed to have inflicted casualties on the crew of an Israeli Merkava tank in the Tyre Harfa-Jbeen triangle by destroying it using a guided missile.

=== 18 November ===
- The Lebanese Health Ministry announced that 35 people were killed in Israeli attacks in Lebanon a day prior.
- Israeli strikes on an Islamic Health Association Centre in Houmine El Tahta and a health centre in the village of Hanaway killed two paramedics. Another Israeli strike on an ambulance center in Bazouriyeh injured two more paramedics.
- Israeli strikes in Nabatieh Governorate killed at least six paramedics.
- A Hezbollah rocket struck a multi-story building in Shfar'am killing a woman and injuring 10 others. Separate rocket barrages on northern Israel injured two people.
- In the evening, a Hezbollah missile hit exactly on the administrative border between Ramat Gan and Bnei Brak in front of one of the towers in a district of high-rise office towers, injuring six people, one seriously. It was later reported that an IDF interceptor hit that missile at high altitude but failed to detonate it.
- The IDF announced that an airstrike in southern Lebanon killed the commander of Hezbollah's medium-range rocket unit.

=== 19 November ===
- The Lebanese Health Ministry announced that 28 people were killed in Israeli attacks in Lebanon a day prior.
- Hezbollah rockets damaged several houses and vehicles in Kiryat Shmona.
- A Hezbollah rocket strike injured seven people in central Israel.
- A reservist of the Golani Brigade's logistics unit was killed and three others were seriously injured in a Hezbollah drone strike in southern Lebanon, increasing the IDF death toll since the invasion of Lebanon to 53.
- The IDF said that it conducted more than 150 strikes against Hezbollah targets throughout Lebanon including 25 weapons depots and approximately 30 rocket launchers since 17 November.
- The UNIFIL said that four Ghanaian peacekeepers were injured when a rocket that was most likely launched by "non-state actors" hit their base in Ramyah. In a separate incident, eight rockets struck an Italian UNIFIL headquarters in Chamaa. The IDF blamed Hezbollah for both attacks.
- An Israeli airstrike hit a Lebanese Army position in Sarafand killing three soldiers and injuring 17 others, including civilians.
- The French foreign ministry announced that an UN peacekeeping patrol in Lebanon comprising French soldiers came under fire.

=== 20 November ===
- The Lebanese Health Ministry announced that 14 people were killed in Israeli attacks in Lebanon a day prior.
- The NNA reported that Hezbollah fighters destroyed an Israeli Merkava tank in Al Bayyadah town in the vicinity of Naqoura.
- An Israeli strike hit a Lebanese army vehicle in a road between Burj al-Muluk and Al-Qlaiaah, killing a Lebanese soldier and injuring another.
- Israeli strikes in Palmyra killed 108 Iran-backed fighters, including four from Hezbollah, and injured 21 others including seven civilians.
- The IDF announced that it attacked over 100 Hezbollah targets in Lebanon including launchers, facilities used for storing weapons, command centres, and military structures one day prior. It also announced that the IAF killed the commanders of its anti-tank missile unit and operations unit in the coastal area on 17 November.
- A reservist from the Maglan unit was killed following a building collapse in southern Lebanon.
- During a shootout with two Hezbollah militants, a soldier and Zhabo Erlich, an armed civilian researcher wearing an IDF uniform were both killed. Erlich had entered southern Lebanon in breach of IDF procedures, accompanied by the Golani Brigade's chief of staff Col. Yarom, reportedly to see the Chamaa fortress. Two others were injured, namely the brigade's chief of staff and a company commander from the brigade's 13th Battalion. Both militants were also killed. Erlich was posthumously given a military rank.
- Hezbollah fired a barrage of 25 rockets at the western Galilee, with one striking a kindergarten fence in Acre.

=== 21 November ===
- The Lebanese Health Ministry announced that 25 people were killed in Israeli attacks in Lebanon a day prior.
- The IDF issued evacuation orders for residents for Tyre, as well as Burj al-Shamali, Mashouq and al-Haush villages in Tyre district to move to north of the Awali river. Israeli warplanes then struck al-Haush and Tyre.
- The IDF issued two evacuation orders for residents of Hadath and Haret Hreik, including one centred on three buildings. At least 12 Israeli strikes hit Haret Hreik.
- A rocket strike from Lebanon killed a man in Nahariya.
- Israeli airstrikes in the Baalbek region killed at least 47 people and injured 22 others.

=== 22 November ===
- The Lebanese Health Ministry announced that 62 people were killed in Israeli attacks in Lebanon a day prior.
- Three people were wounded in a stampede while people rushed to bomb shelters in Haifa and Krayot after five rockets entered northern Israel from Lebanon.
- The IDF issued evacuation orders for civilians in Taybeh, Aadshit al-Qusayr and Deir Siriane to immediately move to the northern side of the Awali river.
- The IDF issued evacuation orders for residents of Borj El Chmali, Ma'shouq and a number of buildings in Haret Hreik. Later, Israeli fighter jets launched four strikes targeting Haret Hreik and al-Hadath in Beirut's southern suburbs.
- The IDF issued evacuation orders for residents of buildings near a building highlighted for a strike in Tyre. Later, an Israeli strike hit the building.
- The IDF entered the town of Deir Mimas and set up road blocks around the area with heavy clashes reported.
- An Israeli strike hit an ambulance in Deir Qanoun Ras al-Ain, killing two Hezbollah affiliated paramedics.
- The IDF said that its airstrikes in southern Lebanon destroyed approximately 45 Hezbollah rocket launchers in this week.
- The IDF issued evacuation orders for residents in Mansouri, Iskenderun, Majdal Zoun, Bayut Al-Sayyad Farm and Al-Haush in Lebanon to move to the north of the Awali river and issued another evacuation order for Chiyah, highlighting two buildings. An Israeli missile destroyed a multistory building in Chiyah.
- Israeli strikes in Qatrani, Jezzine District killed three paramedics from the Islamic Health Association.
- Two rockets likely fired by Hezbollah hit a UNIFIL base in Chamaa, slightly injuring at least four Italian peacekeepers.
- Hezbollah claimed that its drone hit Israeli forces in Yarin.
- Hezbollah claimed to have forced an Israeli warplane to leave Lebanese airspace by confronting it using "appropriate weapons” opposite Sidon.
- The IDF issued evacuation orders for all residents of Hadath, Haret Hreik and Ghobeiry, highlighting three buildings.
- The IDF said that its fighter jets launched strikes on Hezbollah targets including command headquarters, intelligence infrastructure, weapons depots, observation posts and military buildings in Tyre.
- An Israeli strike in the Baalbek area killed seven people including the director-general of Dar al-Amal University Hospital.
- An Israeli airstrike in Syria killed Ali Musa Daqduq, a senior Hezbollah militant and one of the planners of a raid in 2007 that killed five US soldiers during the Iraq War.
- Hezbollah fired approximately 80 rockets at northern Israel.

=== 23 November ===
- The Lebanese Health Ministry announced that 25 people were killed in Israeli attacks in Lebanon a day prior.
- Hezbollah released two photos of what it claimed as its guided missiles hitting two Israeli tanks.
- An Israeli airstrike on a building in Basta area of Beirut Central District targeting Hezbollah official Muhammad Haydar killed at least 29 people and injured 67 others including women. The target was reportedly not present in the building. The IDF claimed to have struck a command center of Hezbollah.
- The IDF issued evacuation orders for residents in parts of Hadath, Choueifat and Al-Amrousieh to move at least 500 metres. Israeli forces conducted strikes in Hadath and in Choueifat approximately one hour later.
- An Israeli drone strike killed two fishermen in Tyre.
- Hezbollah claimed to have inflicted casualties on Israeli soldiers heading towards al-Bayada.
- Hezbollah claimed to have hit Israeli soldiers in Deir Mimas and Khiam using rockets and missiles in three separate strikes.
- An Israeli air strike on a residence in Shmestar killed eight people, including four children, and wounded nine others, four of them seriously.
- SANA reported that Israeli forces targeted the Jusiyah crossing in al-Qusayr, Syria, causing minor material damage.
- The IDF claimed that it hit a Hezbollah military headquarters when it struck Dahieh.
- Hezbollah claimed that it inflicted casualties among the crew of two Merkava tanks using guided missiles on the eastern outskirts of al-Bayada and Al Jabin. Hezbollah claimed that its drone hit the headquarters of the Golani Brigade Command, north of Acre.
- An Israeli air strike in Ain Baal killed at least two people and injured four paramedics.
- A soldier from the Golani Brigade's 13th Battalion was seriously injured in southern Lebanon.

=== 24 November ===
- The Lebanese Health Ministry announced that 84 people were killed in Israeli attacks in the past 24 hours.
- The IDF issued evacuation orders for residents of East Zotar, West Zotar, Arnoun, Yahmar and Al-Qasiba.
- An Israeli strike hit a Lebanese army centre in Al-Amiriya town on the Al-Qalila-Tyre road killing a Lebanese soldier and injuring 18 others. The IDF apologized for the attack.
- At least 250 rockets were launched from Lebanon towards Israel. There were six instances of direct impact in five different places, including two IDF sites. Totally, some 10 Israelis were wounded, including one critically.
- The IDF called residents in parts of the southern suburbs of Beirut to evacuate. Israeli strikes hit the Kafaat area approximately an hour later.
- Al Jazeera reported that Hezbollah fighters forced the IDF to retreat from th strategic al-Bayyaada hill.
- The IDF issued evacuation orders for residents in certain buildings in Ghobeiry and Bourj el-Barajneh.
- The IDF issued evacuation orders for residents in certain buildings in Ghobeiry and Bourj el-Barajneh. Later, Israeli strikes hit the area.
- The IDF claimed that it struck 12 Hezbollah military headquarters including its intelligence headquarters and its coastal missile unit.
- Hezbollah claimed to have destroyed six Merkava tanks in southern Lebanon.

=== 25 November ===
- The Lebanese Health Ministry announced that 14 people were killed in the past 24 hours.
- The IDF issued evacuation orders for residents of Halta to move to areas north of the Awali River.
- The IDF issued evacuation orders for residents in Haret Hreik. Later, the IDF conducted air strikes in the area, saying that it hit several Hezbollah command centres.
- The IDF issued evacuation orders for residents of four buildings in Beirut's southern suburbs. Later, Israeli air strikes hit the area. The IDF said that its strikes in Nabatieh, Baalbek, the Beqaa Valley, southern Beirut and its outskirts hit approximately 25 Hezbollah targets including its Executive Council's command centres, and intelligence control and collection centres containing Hezbollah commanders and operatives.
- Two people were wounded from shrapnel after Hezbollah launched a barrage of 20 rockets at the Upper and Western Galilee. Two others were wounded, one woman seriously, when ten rockets were fired at Nahariya.
- SANA reported that Israeli strikes hit several bridges in Al-Qusayr, injuring at least two civilians and causing material losses. The IDF said that it targeted routes used by Hezbollah for smuggling Iranian weapons. It also said that it is part of efforts against Unit 4400 of Hezbollah, which is responsible for delivering weapons from Iran and its proxies to Lebanon, through Syria and Iraq.

=== 26 November ===
- The Lebanese Health Ministry announced that 55 people were killed in Israeli attacks the past 24 hours.
- The IDF issued evacuation orders for residents in Laylaki, Choueifat and parts of Ghobeiry, Bourj el-Barajneh and Tahouitet al-Ghadir. Later, Israeli air strikes were reported in the area. The IDF claimed to have struck six Hezbollah targets.
- Israeli forces from the 91st Division raided Hezbollah sites on the eastern part of the Litani River and the Wadi Saluki area.
- A female Israeli soldier was seriously injured by a Hezbollah drone attack in Mount Meron.
- The IDF announced that Ahmed Subhi Hazima, the head of Hezbollah's operations in Lebanon's coastal sector, was killed in an airstrike in Tyre. It claimed that he helped to plan infiltration plans into Israeli territory and was involved in launching antitank missiles towards the western Galilee.
- The IDF said that it struck approximately 30 Hezbollah targets including a launcher used for firing projectiles towards Israel the previous day, facilities used for storing weapons, militant infrastructure sites, command centres, and additional launchers.
- The IDF said that it conducted a wave of strikes on 20 Hezbollah targets including 13 targets in Dahieh including an aerial defence unit centre, an intelligence centre, command centre, facilities used for storing weapons and claimed that other targets were components of Hezbollah's financial system.
- The IDF issued evacuation orders for residents in parts of Tyre and Sidon to move at least 500 metres.
- The IDF issued evacuation orders for residents of Baalbek, Kasarnaba and parts of Hadath.
- SANA reported that Israeli jets conducted an air strike on two villages in Homs Governorate.
- The IDF issued evacuation orders for residents of four locations in Central Beirut for the first time since the start of the conflict. Later, Israeli strikes were reported in the area.
- Israel approved a ceasefire with Hezbollah.
- Lebanese transport minister Ali Hamieh said that Israeli strikes hit the Arida, Dabousieh and Jussiyeh border crossings with Syria. Syrian state media reported that four civilians and two soldiers were killed, while 12 people were injured including children, women and workers in the Syrian Red Crescent. The IDF claimed that it struck several "smuggling routes" into Syria used by Hezbollah for funneling its weapons.
- Hezbollah claimed that its drones targeted IAF chief Tomer Bar's residence in Tel Aviv and other sensitive IDF targets in Tel Aviv and its suburbs.
