= Wafiq Safa =

Head of Hezbollah's Liaison and Coordination Unit

- وفيق صفا
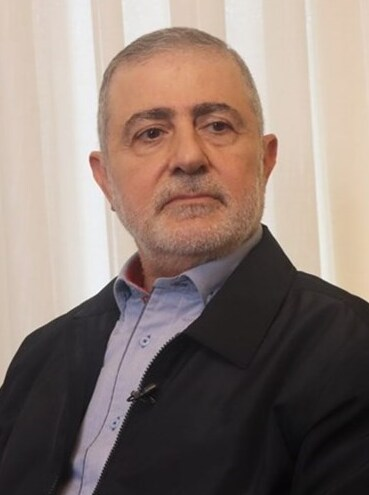
- Safa in 2023
- Born: 1960 (age 65–66); Nabatieh, Lebanon
- Military career
- Allegiance: Hezbollah
- Units: Liaison and Coordination Unit
- Conflicts: Lebanese Civil War

Wafiq Safa (Arabic: وفيق صفا, born in 1960) is a Lebanese security official and a senior member of Hezbollah. As head of Hezbollah's Liaison and Coordination Unit since the late 1980s, reporting directly to the group's Secretary-General, Safa heads Hezbollah's security services and manages the group's relationships in Lebanese politics. He is sometimes referred to as the "Minister of Defense" or "Minister of the Interior" of Hezbollah.

Safa's loyalty to Lebanese Islamist leader Hussein Musawi led to his expulsion by Amal in the early 1980s. Safa was later a member of cell involved in facilitating the 1983 Beirut barracks bombings, alongside Ibrahim Aqil, before joining Hezbollah in 1984.

== Early life and militant activity ==
Safa was born into a Shia Muslim family in Nabatieh, Lebanon, in 1960. He was a follower of Lebanese Islamist leader Hussein Musawi. Safa's loyalty to Musawi led to his expulsion from Amal, the mainline Shia group in Lebanon, in the early 1980s.

Safa was a member of the cell involved in facilitating the 1983 Beirut barracks bombings, alongside Ibrahim Aqil, Ali Majid, and Ali Fatuni. Ahead of the bombing, Safa requested 4,000 pounds of explosives from Lebanese and Palestinian suppliers. According to Israeli intelligence cited to the Washington Post, Safa tapped into explosives caches in Beirut belonging to forces loyal to Said al-Muragha.

== Hezbollah activity ==
In 1984, he joined Hezbollah and climbed the ranks within the organization.

=== Hezbollah leadership ===
In 1987, Secretary-General of Hezbollah Hassan Nasrallah appointed Safa as the group's head of the "Security Committee," later renamed the "Liaison and Coordination Unit".

As head of Hezbollah’s Liaison and Coordination Unit reporting directly to Nasrallah, Safa heads Hezbollah's security services and manages Hezbollah's relationships in Lebanese politics, including regularly meeting with President Michel Aoun and Foreign Minister Gibran Bassil. He is sometimes referred to as Hezbollah's Minister of Defense or "Minister of the Interior".

Safa rose to prominence in the 1990s as Hezbollah's top negotiator on prisoners and hostages. He secured a swap in 2008 in which Hezbollah returned the bodies of Israeli soldiers Eldad Regev and Ehud Goldwasser, killed in the 2006 Hezbollah cross-border raid.

Ali Muntashe, an Israeli agent captured by Hezbollah on April 25, 2009, and handed over to Lebanese security forces for investigation, was accused of being tasked with providing detailed personal information about Safa during the years the organization held IDF soldiers as captives.

The United States Office of Foreign Assets Control (OFAC) sanctioned Safa in 2019, noting that in addition to his role heading Hezbollah's security apparatus, Safa smuggled contraband and facilitated travel for Hezbollah across Lebanon's ports of entry.

In March 2024, Safa made the first public visit by a Hezbollah official to the UAE to negotiate the release of Lebanese citizens linked to Hezbollah detained in the UAE. The visit came amid the escalating Israel-Hezbollah conflict and warming relations between the UAE and Hezbollah.

After Israel assassinated several top leaders of Hezbollah, including Hassan Nasrallah and Fuad Shukr, during the 2024 Israel-Hezbollah war, it targeted Safa in a 10 October airstrike. Safa survived the airstrikes however it killed 22 other people.

=== Resignation and subsequent activity ===
On February 5, 2026, Safa announced his resignation as head of Hezbollah's Liaison and Coordination Unit. The organization accepted his resignation the next day. This marks the first time a figure of his rank has stepped down from Hezbollah. Reports say that he will be replaced by Hussein Abdullah.

Addressing the 2026 Lebanon war, Safa said the Hezbollah has many surprises for Israel, mainly referring to “offensive drones” and that the organization will continue to fight until they defeat the enemy. He also said that Hezbollah will force the Lebanese government to recognize its military actions.

In response to the 2026 Israel–Lebanon peace talks, Safa said that Hezbollah would not abide any agreement that the Lebanese government were to sign.

== Controversy ==
On April 18, 2020, a program aired on the "Al-Jadeed" television channel in Lebanon claiming that Safa owned 30 dunams of real estate registered in his name in the town of Nmairiyeh, and that he also held several commercial companies registered under his son's name. The report sparked an uproar on social media in the country, with users demanding explanations from Hezbollah regarding Safa's conduct.

Amid investigations on the 2020 Beirut port explosion, Safa sent a threatening message to Judge Tarek Bitar through an anonymous journalist. The message stated, "We have had enough of you; we will go to the end of the legal path, and if that does not work, we will remove you by force." In 2021, Safa threatened to "usurp" Tarek Bitar, the Lebanese judge charged with investigation into the 2020 Beirut explosion, which implicated allies of Hezbollah.

During the 2022–2025 Lebanese presidential election, Safa said "we have already said we have no veto", and that "our only veto is against…Geagea", whose election would lead to "discord and destruction"; he also confirmed that Hezbollah would not veto Aoun. This statement has caused significant backlash and political tension in Lebanon. In response to Safa's comments, Lebanese Forces spokesperson Charles Jabbour said on X, calling Hezbollah the "destructive project" that has "destroyed Lebanon again and again and killed the Lebanese with its losing Iranian wars" adding that "This thug should be arrested and prosecuted."
