= October 2024 Bachoura airstrike =

Assassination attempt

- Part of the 2024 Israeli invasion of Lebanon
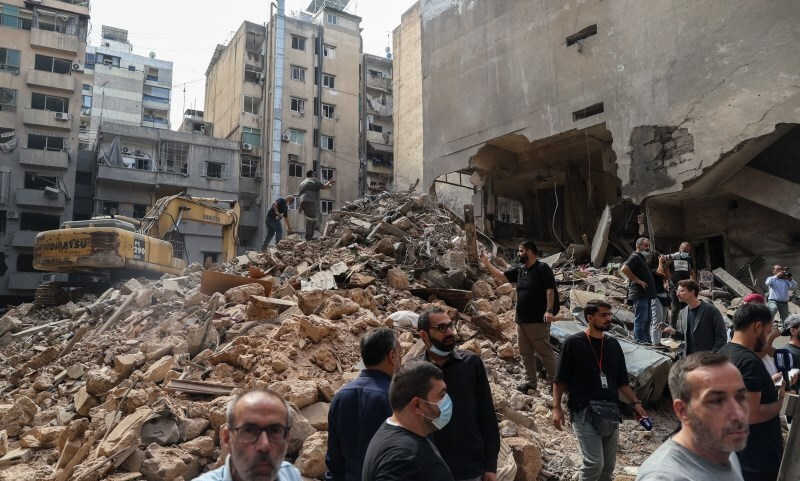
- Aftermath of the airstrike

- Location within Lebanon
- Location: Bachoura, Beirut, Lebanon
- Date: 10 October 2024
- Target: Wafiq Safa
- Attack type: Airstrikes, massacre
- Weapon: US-made JDAM for 2,000-pound bombs
- Deaths: 22+
- Injuries: 117+
- Perpetrator: Israel Defense Forces

On 10 October 2024, the Israel Defense Forces (IDF) carried out an airstrike in Bachoura in central Beirut, Lebanon, as part of the 2024 Israeli invasion of Lebanon. The airstrike in the densely populated neighborhood killed at least 22 Lebanese people and injured another 117. The apparent target of the airstrike was Wafiq Safa, the brother-in-law of former Hezbollah secretary-general Hassan Nasrallah, who reportedly evaded the assassination attempt against him. Israel used US-made JDAM fit for 2,000-pound bombs in the attack. The attack has been the deadliest attack in Beirut since the start of the 2023 Israel–Hezbollah conflict on 8 October 2023.

== Airstrike ==
The airstrike took place in the evening of 10 October 2024. Without warning the locals beforehand, Israel attacked residential buildings in Nweiri and Basta, two densely populated neighborhoods in Bachoura, a small mainly Shia-populated area in central Beirut. According to a neighbour, the four or five-story building was "entirely residential". Many residents fled their apartments as flames and smoke rose from two residential blocks. Among those killed was a family of eight who had evacuated from southern Lebanon following the Israeli evacuation orders. At least 22 Lebanese people were killed and another 117 were injured according to the Lebanese Ministry of Health.

According to a report by The Guardian, Israel used US-made JDAM guidance kits fit for large "dumb bombs" ranging up to 2,000 pounds (910 kg). The Guardian found remnants of JDAM in the debris of a building that was razed by the strike. Human Rights Watch senior researcher Richard Weir verified the weapons remnant and noted that the pattern, position, and shape of the remnant are consistent with US-made JDAM guidance kit for Mark 80 series munitions.

=== Target ===
The IDF apparently targeted senior Hezbollah official Wafiq Safa, who serves as the head of the liaison of Hezbollah and its coordination unit. Safa evaded the assassination attempt, according to three security sources. Neither Israel nor Hezbollah have commented.

Wafiq Safa was sanctioned by the United States Department of the Treasury in 2019. According to the Office of Foreign Assets Control, Safa was head of Hezbollah's security apparatus who directly reported to Hassan Nasrallah, and he allegedly "exploited Lebanon’s ports and border crossings to smuggle contraband and facilitate travel on behalf of Hizballah".

== Reactions ==
On October 13 Hezbollah said it targeted the Israel Defense Forces' soldiers at the Tsnobar logistics base for the Golani Brigade in the Israeli-occupied Golan Heights, who were "preparing to participate in the attack on Lebanon". The group said it was also in response to the Israeli airstrike on Bachoura.
