= Ain Baal =

Ain Baal عين بعال
- Municipality
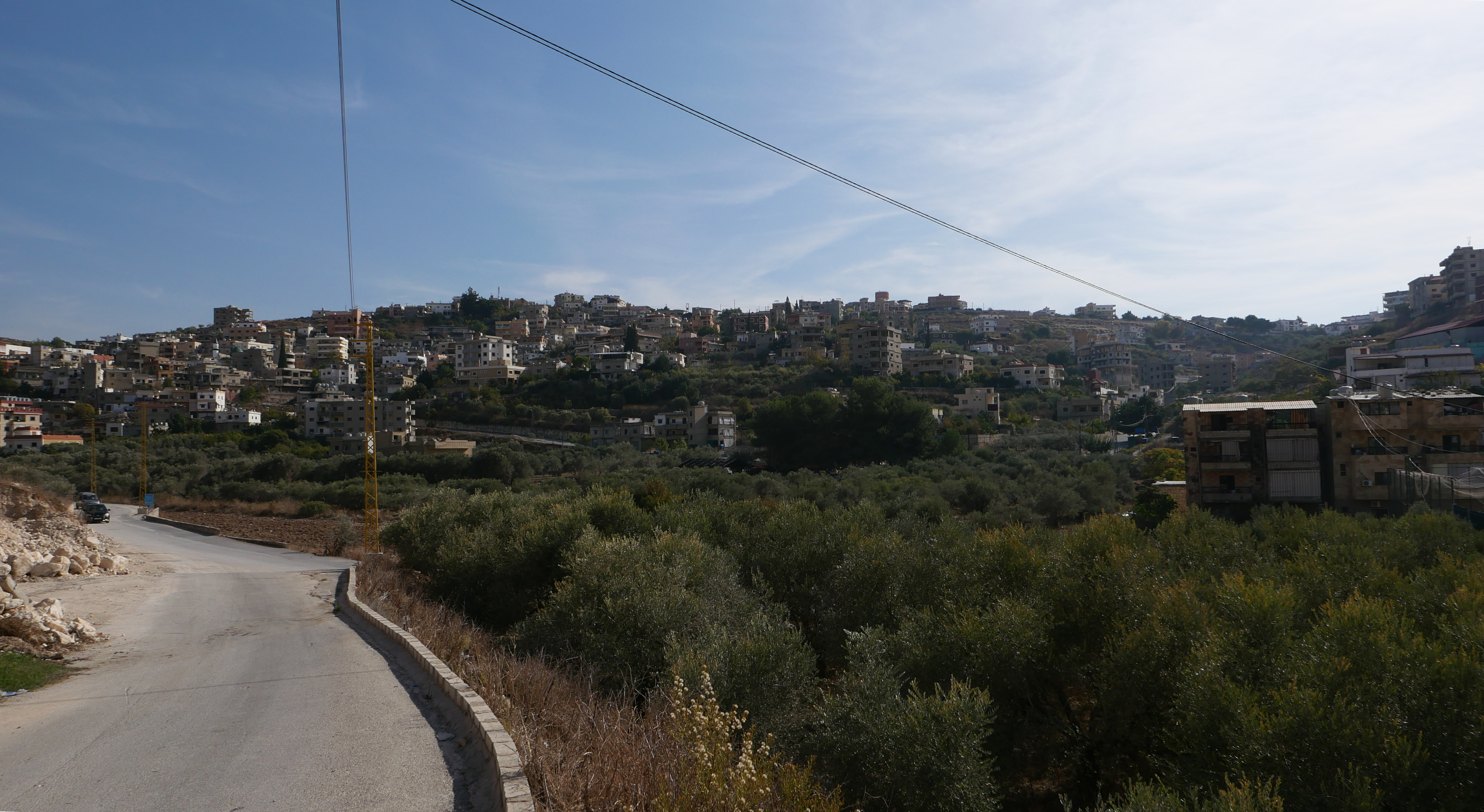

- Location within Lebanon
- Coordinates: 33°14′0.24″N 35°16′13.08″E
- Grid position: 175/293 PAL
- Country: Lebanon
- Governorate: South Governorate
- District: Tyre District
- Elevation: 430 ft (130 m)
- Time zone: GMT +3

Ain Baal (Arabic: عين بعال, romanized: ʿAyn Baʿāl) is a Lebanese town and municipality located in the Caza of Tyre in the South Governorate of Lebanon. The municipality is member of Federation of Tyr (Sour) District Municipalities.

== Etymology ==
Lebanese scholar Tony Mufarrej states that the place name Ain Baal is Aramaic, meaning "the spring of [the god] Baal," citing ancient archaeological remains discovered near the town's water spring. An earlier proposal by the British orientalist E. H. Palmer, writing in 1881, suggested that the name meant "elevated land on which no water falls" or "unwatered vegetation". He further added that "The word may be connected with the name Baal."

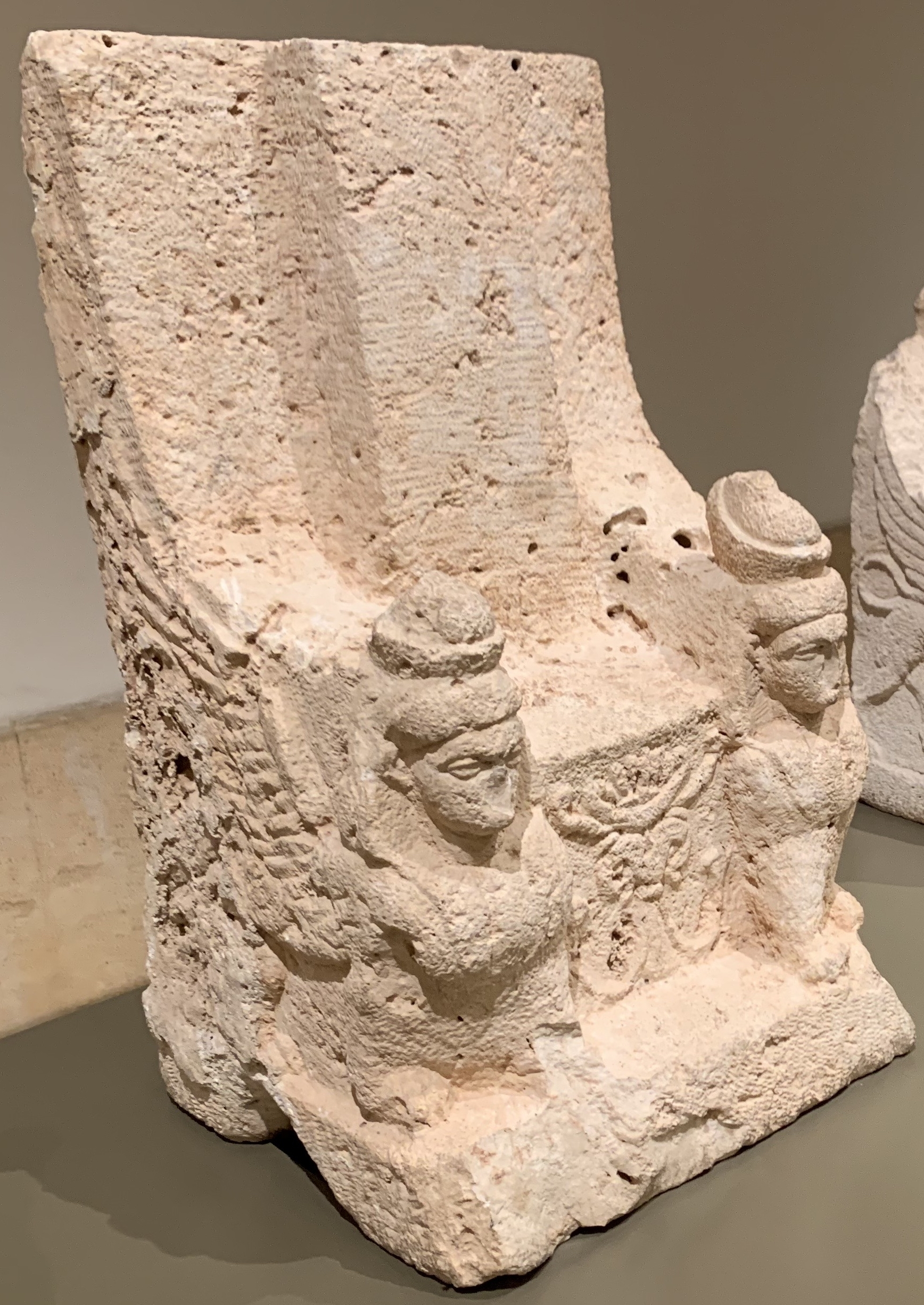
Hellenistic-era throne of Astarted from Ain Baal, now in the National Museum of Beirut

== History ==
=== Early modern ===
In 1875 Victor Guérin recorded the village as having around 200 Shia inhabitants.

In 1881, the Palestine Exploration Fund's Survey of Western Palestine (SWP) described it as: "a stone-built village, containing 200 Metawileh, built in a valley; the ground is arable, with groves of figs and olives planted round the village. The water supply is from the spring of 'Ain Ib'al, [..] just north of the village there are also some cisterns".

=== Operation Litani and the Pinto case ===
During Israel's occupation of southern Lebanon in the spring of 1978, four villagers from Ain Baal were tortured and killed by IDF Lieutenant Daniel Pinto and two other soldiers. A military tribunal subsequently convicted Pinto and sentenced him to 12 years' imprisonment; an appeals court reduced the term to eight years. The trial and hearings were held in closed session, and military censorship withheld details of the case from the Israeli public.

On 28 July 1979, Sheli Member of Knesset Uri Avneri presented the unpublished details of the case to the Knesset, avoiding Israeli censorship laws, and submitted a motion calling for the resignation of Chief of the Staff of the IDF General Rafael Eitan, who had further reduced Pinto's sentence to two years on the grounds that the officer had been alone and facing a situation of extreme danger, a justification the court had already rejected. Avneri's statement was deleted from the Knesset record owing to its "sensitive nature"; the case only became public in September 1979 when foreign newspapers published an account of Pinto's conviction. The affair triggered a wider public controversy in Israel: Eitan appeared before the Knesset's Foreign Affairs and Security Committee, and petitions bearing the signatures of hundreds of students and paratroopers circulated in his support.

== Governance ==
Ain Baal is administered by a municipal council established in 1965, comprising 15 members elected by local residents. The village hosts a weekly public market every Thursday, which draws buyers from neighboring villages.

== Demographics ==
In 2014 Muslims made up 99.56% of registered voters in Ain Baal. 98.75% of the voters were Shiite Muslims.

== Bibliography ==
- Centre for Social Sciences Research and Action (2010). Ain Baal Village Profile (PDF) (Report). Beirut: Centre for Social Sciences Research and Action.
- Conder, C.R.; Kitchener, Horatio Herbert (1881). The survey of Western Palestine. London: ommittee of the Palestine Exploration Fund. OCLC 871197829.
- Guérin, Victor (1880). Description géographique, historique et archéologique de la Palestine : accompagnée de cartes détaillées. III, Galilée. Tome II. Paris: Imprimerie nationale. OCLC 492729599.
- The Detroit Jewish News (3 August 1979). "Two-Year Sentence in Murder of Arab Draws Criticism for Israeli Chief of Staff". The Detroit Jewish News.
- Mufarrej, Tony (2002). موسوعة قرى ومدن لبنان [Encyclopedia of villages and cities of Lebanon] (in Arabic). Vol. 16. Beirut: Nobilis.
- Palmer, E.H. (1881). The Survey of Western Palestine: Arabic and English Name Lists Collected During the Survey by Lieutenants Conder and Kitchener, R. E. Transliterated and Explained by E.H. Palmer. Committee of the Palestine Exploration Fund.
