= Timeline of the 2026 Lebanon war =

This timeline of the 2026 Lebanon war covers the period from 2 March 2026, when Hezbollah fired projectiles towards Israel from Lebanon following the start of the 2026 Iran war, to the present.

== March 2026 ==
=== 2 March ===
- Hezbollah fired projectiles towards Israel from Lebanon in response to the killing of Iranian Supreme Leader Ali Khamenei, prompting retaliatory strikes by the IDF. Hezbollah said that it targeted the Mishmar HaCarmel missile defence site in the vicinity of Haifa. Hezbollah later claimed that the attack was a "defensive act" after over a year of Israeli attacks despite a truce. It added that it restarted fighting to force Israel to stop its aggression and evacuate from seized Lebanese territories, emphasising that the move was unrelated to the Iran war.
- The Lebanese Health Ministry said at least 52 people were killed and 154 others were injured in Israeli attacks. The IDF said that Hezbollah intelligence chief, Hussain Makled, was killed in the strikes.
- Lebanon banned military activities by Hezbollah.

=== 3 March ===
- The IDF carried out airstrikes on Beirut and deployed soldiers to several locations in southern Lebanon as part of a "forward defence" measure along the border. In response, Hezbollah said it had carried out drone and missile attacks on Ramat David Airbase, the Meron monitoring base and Camp Yitzhak.

=== 4 March ===
- The Lebanese Health Ministry said that Israeli attacks in the past 24 hours killed 20 people and injured 283 others, raising the death toll since the escalation to 72.
- Al Jazeera reported that the IDF carried out airstrikes in Beirut, Baalbek, Mount Lebanon, and Khiam, killing 11 people and injuring four others. Hezbollah said it had carried out attacks on IDF bases near Metula and Safed. The Lebanese Health Ministry said that those killed in Lebanon in the last 24 hours include seven children.

=== 5 March ===
- The Lebanese Health Ministry said that casualties since the escalation rose to 102 killed and 638 wounded in the past 24 hours.
- Four members of the Ghazali family (2 men and 2 children) were killed by an Israeli airstrike on their home during Iftar. The IDF claimed responsibility for the attack, alleging that the children's father (Ibrahim Ghazali) was in Hezbollah's anti-tank missile unit.
- Two Israeli soldiers were wounded during combat with Hezbollah militants in southern Lebanon, including an officer in serious condition.
- Israeli forces warned Lebanese to evacuate the southern suburbs of Beirut.

=== 6 March ===
- The Lebanese Health Ministry said that casualties from Israeli attacks since the escalation rose to 217 killed and 798 wounded in the past 24 hours.
- Hezbollah warned Israelis to evacuate areas within 5 km (3.1 mi) of the Lebanon-Israel border, citing "the (Israeli) army's deployment of military vehicles and armoured personnel carriers in open areas, using these areas as military deployment points".
- Eight Israeli soldiers were injured in a rocket attack by Hezbollah militants on an IDF position in northern Israel. Finance Minister Bezalel Smotrich's office said that those slightly wounded by the rocket strike included his son. Later, two soldiers were wounded in an anti-tank missile attack by Hezbollah militants in southern Lebanon.
- A missile strike hit the headquarters of Ghana's UNIFIL battalion, critically wounding two peacekeepers. A source said that early indications showed that Israeli tank fire hit a UN base in Lebanon. The IDF later admitted that its tank fire hit the base, saying that it regrets the incident.
- Israeli commandos conducted an overnight raid in Al-Nabi Shayth in search of missing pilot Ron Arad, leading to a shootout. Airstrikes in the area killed 41 people and injured 40 others.

=== 7 March ===
- The Lebanese Health Ministry said that casualties from Israeli attacks since the escalation rose to 294 killed and 1,023 wounded in the past 24 hours.

=== 8 March ===
- The Lebanese Health Ministry said that casualties from Israeli attacks since the escalation rose to 394 killed and 1,130 wounded in the past 24 hours.
- Lebanon's health ministry said that four people were killed in an Israeli airstrike on a hotel room in central Beirut. The IDF said it targeted members of the Iranian Quds Force.
- Anti-tank missiles fired by Hezbollah militants struck Israeli armored vehicles in southern Lebanon, killing two soldiers and lightly injuring another.

=== 9 March ===
- The Lebanese Health Ministry said that casualties from Israeli attacks since the escalation rose to 486 killed and 1,313 wounded in the past 24 hours.
- Lebanese media reported that Israeli tank fire in Al-Qlayaa killed a Lebanese Catholic priest.
- Defense Minister Israel Katz said that the IDF killed the leader of Hezbollah's Nasr Unit.
- Hezbollah rocket attacks at central Israel lightly wounded 18 people, with the group stating it targeted a communications site in the Elah Valley and a Home Front Command base in Ramla. Ynet reported that a kindergarten in Ramla was hit, and smoke was seen in Beit Shemesh. Later the IDF reported striking the launcher.

=== 10 March ===
- The Lebanese Health Ministry said that casualties from Israeli attacks since the escalation rose to 570 killed and 1,444 wounded in the past 24 hours.

=== 11 March ===
- The Lebanese Health Ministry reported that casualties from Israeli attacks in Lebanon rose to 634 killed and 1,586 injured in the past 24 hours.
- The IDF said that Hezbollah fired 200 rockets at Israel, of which 80 failed to enter the country. It added that it managed to prevent the launch of additional 400 rockets.

=== 12 March ===
- The Lebanese Health Ministry said that casualties from Israeli attacks since the escalation increased to 687 killed including 52 women and 92 children and 1,774 wounded in the past 24 hours.
- A strike on a car in Ramlet al-Baida, Beirut, killed eight people and injured 31 others.
- The IDF said that it killed the commander of the Imam Hossein Division and other key members of the unit in airstrikes the day prior. It also said that it killed a Hezbollah militant who served as commander of the Radwan Force's southern Lebanese branch.

=== 13 March ===
- The Lebanese Health Ministry said that Israeli attacks since the escalation killed 773 people and injured 1,933 others.
- The IDF said that it killed two senior members of Hezbollah's Badr Unit who managed rocket fire at Israel.
- An Israeli strike on a healthcare facility in Burj Qalaouiyah killed 12 medics and injured another.
- Israel destroyed the Zrarieh Bridge over the Litani River, citing its use in Hezbollah movements.

=== 14 March ===
- The Lebanese Health Ministry said that Israeli attacks since the escalation killed 826 people and injured 2,009 others, adding that 31 paramedics were among the dead.
- The IDF said it killed an IRGC commander in Lebanon who was both a member of Hezbollah's communications unit and the Quds Force's Palestine Corps.
- Hezbollah fired a cluster bomb at Metula.
- Twelve rockets were fired from Lebanon at Israel's Upper Galilee.
- Several rockets were fired from Lebanon at Israel's Krayot area, causing damage and prompting the closure of Israel's Highway 4 due to the impact of an explosive.

=== 15 March ===
- The Lebanese Health Ministry said that Israeli attacks since the escalation killed 850 people and injured 2,105 others.
- A Hamas official was killed in an Israeli strike in Sidon.
- Three people were killed in an Israeli attack on al-Qatrani.

=== 16 March ===
- The Lebanese Health Ministry said that Israeli attacks since the escalation killed 886 people and injured 2,141 others.
- Hezbollah rocket attacks injured six people in Nahariya and injured a seventh near Kabri.

=== 17 March ===
- The Lebanese Health Ministry said that Israeli attacks since the escalation killed 912 people and injured 2,221 others.
- An Israeli strike hit a car and a motorcycle in Nabatieh, killing one Lebanese soldier and injuring four other Lebanese soldiers.

=== 18 March ===
- The Lebanese Health Ministry said that Israeli attacks since the escalation killed 968 people including 116 children, 77 women and 40 health workers and injured 2,432 others.
- Six people were killed in an Israeli airstrike on a building in Bashoura, central Beirut. Four others were killed in a separate airstrike on a house in Sahmar.
- The IDF said that it killed the commander of Hezbollah's Imam Hussein Division in Beirut a week after his predecessor was killed.
- Defence Minister Israel Katz said that Israeli forces destroyed two bridges above the Litani River that were used by Hezbollah to smuggle arms south.
- The IDF said that it had killed more than 20 Hezbollah militants and seized weapons in south Lebanon in the past 24 hours.
- Hezbollah fired a missile at the Gaza envelope that was downed by the IDF.

=== 19 March ===
- The Lebanese Health Ministry said that Israeli attacks since the escalation killed 1,001 people including 118 children, 79 women and 40 health workers and injured 2,584 others.
- An Israeli missile strike on the Al-Qasmiya Bridge over the Litani River injured two members of an RT crew filming nearby.

=== 22 March ===
- An Israeli farmer was killed in Misgav Am. An Israeli investigation later found that he was killed by errant Israeli artillery fire. Hezbollah said that it targeted Israeli troops in the area.
- The IDF said that its strike in Majdal Selem killed a Redwan Force commander and two other Hezbollah militants.
- The IDF said that it and Shin Bet killed a Hamas militant in Lebanon who participated in financing the group's activities.

=== 24 March ===
- Hezbollah militants launched a rocket barrage towards northern Israel, killing a woman and injuring two others.

=== 25 March ===
- The Alma center reported that Hezbollah launched 105 attack waves on Israel on this day, making it the most intense day of attacks on Israel since the beginning of the 2026 Iran war. It also reported that since the beginning of the war a total of 1084 attack waves were launched from Lebanon to Israel.

=== 26 March ===
- Hezbollah militants launched rockets towards Nahariya, killing a man and injuring 14 others, one seriously.
- An Israeli soldier was killed and two other Israeli soldiers were lightly injured during a shootout with Hezbollah militants in southern Lebanon. Earlier, an anti-tank missile attack targeting Golani Brigade soldiers in southern Lebanon killed one and injured four.

=== 28 March ===
- Overnight Hezbollah anti-tank missile and rocket strikes in southern Lebanon wounded nine Israeli soldiers, two seriously.
- The IDF said that it killed two senior militants from Hezbollah's communications unit in Beirut.
- An Israeli strike hit a vehicle in south Lebanon, killing a journalist belonging to Hezbollah-affiliated Al-Manar TV and two Al-Mayadeen journalists, including a female journalist. The IDF said that the Al-Manar TV journalist was also a militant involved in Hezbollah intelligence who had reported on the locations of Israeli troops in south Lebanon and accused him of "incitement" against Israeli troops and civilians, without providing proof.
- A soldier of the IDF’s Paratroopers Brigade was killed in a Hezbollah rocket attack in southern Lebanon, increasing the number of IDF soldiers killed since the start of the war to five. The paratrooper was identified as Sgt. Moshe Katz, a native of New Haven, Connecticut.

=== 29 March ===
- Two Indonesian UNIFIL peacekeepers were killed and two others were injured when a projectile hit a base near Aadshit al-Qusayr.
- Forty-nine people were killed in Israeli attacks in Lebanon, increasing the Lebanese death toll since the beginning of the war to 1,238.

=== 30 March ===
- An overnight anti-tank missile attack in southern Lebanon killed an Israeli soldier and seriously injured another, increasing the IDF death toll since the start of the war to six. Six other troops were wounded in separate incidents.
- An Israeli strike hit a Lebanese Army checkpoint, killing one soldier and wounding other troops.
- The IDF said that it killed two militants from Hezbollah's Unit 1800, responsible for liaising with Palestinian militant groups, in Beirut.
- Two UNIFIL peacekeepers were killed and a third was seriously injured when an explosion struck their vehicle near Bani Haiyyan.
- Four soldiers from the Nahal Brigade's reconnaissance unit were killed and two others were wounded, one seriously, during a clash with Hezbollah militants in southern Lebanon, increasing the IDF death toll in Lebanon to 11.
- An Israeli soccer team had to halt a training session due to the danger posed by a rocket that was fired from Lebanon.

=== 31 March ===
- At least eight people including one paramedic were killed in Israeli strikes in south Lebanon.
- Israeli airstrikes in Jnah area of Beirut killed seven people and injured 26 others. The IDF said that an Israeli Navy strike in the capital killed Hajj Yusuf Ismail Hashem who served as the commander of Hezbollah's Southern Front and accused him of targeting Israeli civilians. The Lebanese group later confirmed his death, saying that he was killed alongside a group of second-tier and third-tier commanders.
- The IDF said that its unit 300 has uncovered dozens of launchers loaded with rockets in Lebanon aimed at Israel.
- Israeli media reported that Hezbollah launched 50 rockets on Israel, including 29 high-trajectory weapons and 17 attacks using UAVs.

== April 2026 ==
=== 1 April ===
- The Lebanese health ministry said that at least 50 people were killed in Israeli strikes in Lebanon in the last 24 hours, increasing its count of the death toll in Lebanon since 2 March to 1,318.
- The IDF said that it struck two currency exchange stores used by Hezbollah militants in Beirut.
- The Alma center reported that Hezbollah launched 33 waves of attacks on April 1st.

=== 2 April ===
- At least 27 people were killed in Israeli strikes in Lebanon in the previous 24 hours, increasing the Lebanese death toll since 2 March to 1,345.
- i24NEWS reported that Hezbollah fired more than 130 rockets at Israel in the past day, and additional 260 of its rockets fell within Lebanon in its attempts to hit IDF soldiers.
- The IDF said that it killed more than 40 Hezbollah militants in the past day.
- The Alma center reported that Hezbollah launched 35 waves of attacks on April 2nd.

=== 3 April ===
- At least 23 people were killed in Israeli strikes in Lebanon in the previous 24 hours, increasing the Lebanese death toll since the start of the war to 1,368.
- Rockets were reportedly fired from Lebanon at northern Israel in coordination with Iranian rockets.

=== 4 April ===
- At least 54 people were killed in Israeli attacks in Lebanon in the previous 24 hours, increasing the Lebanese death toll since the start of the war to 1,422.
- An IDF soldier from the 210th Division was killed and another was critically injured in a friendly fire incident during an overnight raid in southern Lebanon to capture a suspect believed to be aiding Hezbollah.
- The IDF issued an evacuation order for the Masnaa Border Crossing, saying that Hezbollah was using it for military purposes.

=== 5 April ===
- At least 39 people were killed in Israeli attacks in Lebanon in the previous 24 hours, increasing the Lebanese death toll since the start of the war to 1,461.
- The Lebanese Army announced that an Israeli strike in south Lebanon killed one of its soldiers.
- The IDF said that it found rocket launchers, RPGs, and surface-to-surface missiles allegedly stored in a school in Lebanon.
- Since the end of February the IDF said that it has detected 165 rockets that were launched by Hezbollah and struck within UNIFIL bases or close to them.
- Seven people including a four-year-old girl were killed in an Israeli strike in Kfar Hatta following an Israeli overnight evacuation order instructing people to leave the village.
- Four people were killed and 39 others were wounded in an Israeli strike in Beirut's Jnah neighbourhood.
- An Israeli airstrike in Ain Saadeh, Beirut, killed three people, including head of the Lebanese Forces' center in Yahchouch and his wife. The Lebanese Forces said that the strike targeted a member of the Quds Force, who apparently survived.

=== 6 April ===
- At least 36 people were killed in Israeli attacks in Lebanon in the previous 24 hours, increasing the Lebanese death toll since the start of the war to 1,497.
- The Alma center reported that three Israeli civilians and 11 IDF soldiers were killed in the fighting in the Lebanese theater since the start of the war. It also reported that since 2 March, Hezbollah launched 1,121 waves of attacks towards Israel's territory, of which 70% were rocket attacks and 29% involved UAVs.

=== 7 April ===
- At least 33 people were killed in Israeli attacks in Lebanon in the previous 24 hours, increasing the Lebanese death toll since the start of the war to 1,530.
- The Alma center reported that Hezbollah carried out 43 waves of attacks from Lebanon to Israel, including 10 rockets that were fired at Nahariya and injured two civilians, and 40 more rockets that were fired from Lebanon into Israeli communities.
- Israeli Prime Minister Benjamin Netanyahu asserted that the US-Israel-Iran ceasefire does not apply to Lebanon, contradicting mediator Pakistani Prime Minister Shehbaz Sharif's announcement.
- An Israeli soldier from the Golani Brigade was killed and five others were injured during a clash with Hezbollah militants in southern Lebanon, raising the IDF death toll to 12.

=== 8 April ===
- Hezbollah said that it halted attacks on Israel and on Israeli soldiers in Lebanon.
- The IDF said that it had targeted more than a hundred Hezbollah assets including headquarters, intelligence centers, missile infrastructure, sites related to the Radwan Force and aerial and naval units, killing at least 250 Hezbollah militants. Al Jazeera reported that the strikes killed at least 254 people and injured at least 1,165 others. In Beirut alone, at least 92 people were killed and at least 742 others were injured. Hezbollah claimed responsibility for launching rockets towards north Israel as a response to "cease-fire violations".
- Iranian media said that Iran paused Hormuz traffic over Israeli attacks in Lebanon.

=== 9 April ===
- The IDF said that it killed Ali Yusuf Harshi, the secretary and nephew of Hezbollah leader Naim Qassem, in an airstrike in Beirut.
- The IDF said that an airstrike in Sidon the day prior killed Maher Qassem Hamdan, the commander of the Lebanese Resistance Brigades in Shebaa, along with eight other militants.
- The IDF issued evacuation order for southern suburbs of Beirut, saying that it is only targeting Hezbollah militants and military targets.
- Israel Katz said that over 200 Hezbollah militants were killed in airstrikes the day prior.
- The Alma center reported that Hezbollah carried out at least 15 waves of attacks from Lebanon to Israel.

=== 10 April ===
- Nineteen people including 13 Lebanese State Security personnel were killed and almost 15 others were injured in an Israeli strike in Nabatieh.
- Hezbollah fired a missile at Ashdod in the early morning. The group said that it targeted Ashdod Naval Base.
- Mako reported that two IDF soldiers were injured by shrapnel from an explosive drone which fell in their vicinity in south Lebanon.
- Mako reported that Hezbollah fired more than 100 rockets at Israel since the beginning of the 2026 Iran war ceasefire. It also reported that those wounded in a rocket barrage from Lebanon which hit the Karmiel area include a 4-month-old Israeli infant and four Israeli children.
- A Hezbollah rocket barrage towards northern Israel hit and damaged a 1,500 year-old church in Nahariya.

=== 11 April ===
- At least 67 people were killed in Israeli attacks in Lebanon in the previous 24 hours, increasing the Lebanese death toll since the start of the war to 2,020.
- Hezbollah militants fired 10 rockets at Karmiel, and fired additional 30 rocket at other locations in northern Israel, triggering repeated emergency sirens throughout the day.

=== 12 April ===
- At least 35 people were killed in Israeli attacks in Lebanon in the previous 24 hours, increasing the Lebanese death toll since the start of the war to 2,055 including 165 children.
- The IDF said that it killed 20 Hezbollah militants during an operation in a hospital in Bint Jbeil that was allegedly used to store weapons and carry out surveillance and accused the group of using medical facilities and ambulances in Lebanon for military activities.
- A Hezbollah rocket attack in southern Lebanon moderately injured two Israeli soldiers.

=== 13 April ===
- At least 34 people were killed in Israeli attacks in Lebanon in the previous 24 hours, increasing the Lebanese death toll since the start of the war to 2,089.
- An Israeli woman was lightly injured in a rocket attack by Hezbollah militants in Nahariya.
- An IDF Humvee overturned in southern Lebanon, killing a reservist and injuring three others.

=== 14 April ===
- At least 35 people were killed in Israeli attacks in Lebanon in the previous 24 hours, increasing the Lebanese death toll since the start of the war to 2,124.
- Ten Israeli soldiers from the 35th Paratroopers Brigade were injured, three seriously, during an overnight battle with Hezbollah militants in Bint Jbeil.
- Israel and Lebanon held direct talks in Washington, D.C. for the first time since 1993, aimed at establishing negotiations between the two countries to end the war.
- The IDF said that three Hezbollah militants surrendered in Bint Jbeil, while the commander of the 401st Brigade's 52nd Battalion was seriously injured in the area.
- The IDF said that a missile launcher that was aimed at Israel was uncovered in Lebanon.
- Hezbollah fired 47 rockets at northern Israel and additional 17 rockets within Lebanon at IDF soldiers.

=== 15 April ===
- At least 43 people were killed in Israeli attacks in Lebanon in the previous 24 hours, increasing the Lebanese death toll since the start of the war to 2,167.
- The IDF said that more than 1,700 Hezbollah militants were killed in Lebanon since the end of February.
- Hezbollah fired more than 40 rockets at Israel, injuring one person in Tamra.
- Paramedic groups said that an Israeli quadruple tap strike in Mayfadoun killed four paramedics and injured six others.
- A Hezbollah rocket strike in southern Lebanon injured five Israeli soldiers, one seriously.

=== 16 April ===
- The Lebanese health ministry said at least 29 people were killed in Israeli attacks in Lebanon in the previous 24 hours, increasing the Lebanese death toll according to its count since the start of the war to 2,196 including 172 children.
- Hezbollah fired a missile at central Israel, which fell in an open area.
- The commander of the IDF's Unit 603 said that his forces destroyed more than 1,000 militant sites in Lebanon, many of which were residential houses that Hezbollah allegedly converted to weapon storage facilities.
- Hezbollah rocket attacks seriously injured two Israelis near Karmiel and injured another Israeli in Nahariya.
- An Israeli strike hit a building in Tyre, killing 13 members of a family including at least a woman, injured 35 others and 15 others went missing.
- US President Donald Trump announced that Israel and Lebanon agreed to a 10-day truce.
- The Israeli military destroyed the Qasmieh Bridge hours before the ceasefire announcement.

=== 17 April ===
- The Lebanese death toll since March 2 increased to 2,294.
- The Lebanese army alleged Israeli shelling in several villages in south Lebanon in breach of the ceasefire.
- Iran announced that passage of commercial vessels through the Strait of Hormuz is completely open during the truce in Lebanon.
- An Israeli reservist was killed and three others were injured when a Hezbollah bomb exploded while they were searching a building in Al-Jibbain.

=== 18 April ===
- Iran said that it closed the Strait of Hormuz again in response to the US refusing to lift its naval blockade.
- The IDF said that it carried out several strikes on Hezbollah militants whom it accused of violating the ceasefire by approaching its troops in the "Yellow Line" in southern Lebanon over the past day.
- French president Emmanuel Macron said that a French soldier was killed and three others were injured in an attack on UNIFIL peacekeepers apparently conducted by Hezbollah. The group's leadership denied involvement. Macron later announced that another French soldier died from the injuries sustained in the attack.
- The IDF said that one of its reservists was killed while three other soldiers were injured during combat in southern Lebanon.

=== 19 April ===
- The IDF said that one of its soldiers was killed and nine others were injured, one critically during combat in southern Lebanon.

=== 21 April ===
- The IDF said that Hezbollah violated the ceasefire by launching rockets at an Israeli position in Rab Thalathin and a drone into northern Israel. It added that it hit the rocket launcher as a response to one of those incidents. Hezbollah said that it fired rockets and attack drones towards a site in northern Israel that it said was the source of artillery shelling towards a town in south Lebanon in retaliation for what it said were Israeli violations of the truce.

=== 22 April ===
- Two people were killed in an Israeli strike on a car in southern Lebanon. One Lebanese female journalist was killed and another journalist was critically injured in a second Israeli strike that hit a house in the same area. The IDF said that individuals had violated the truce, endangering its forces.
- Hezbollah said that it attacked an Israeli position in Al-Bayyada with a drone in retaliation to alleged Israeli violations of the truce. The IDF said that it intercepted the drone. The group added that it launched a drone attack on Israeli troops and a Humvee in al-Qantara in retaliation for Israeli attacks and downed four Israeli reconnaissance drones in southern Lebanon.

=== 23 April ===
- Two people, including a child were injured due to Israeli artillery fire on Yatar.
- The IDF said that Hezbollah militants launched a guided anti-tank missile near troops in southern Lebanon. It later said that the group launched an explosive-laden drone attack on troops in southern Lebanon, lightly injuring one soldier, and launched several rockets at an IDF position in Aynata.
- An Israeli strike on a car in Nabatieh killed three people. The IDF said that it killed three Hezbollah militants who attempted to shoot down an Israeli drone above southern Lebanon.
- Hezbollah militants fired four rockets at Shtula, causing no damage or injuries. The IDF said it attacked structures used by the group in southern Lebanon after the rocket fire.
- President Trump said that Israel and Lebanon agreed to a three week extension of the ceasefire.

=== 24 April ===
- The Lebanese health ministry said that the Lebanese death toll since the start of the war according to its count increased to 2,491.
- The IDF issued evacuation orders for Deir Aames, saying that Hezbollah militants are using the area for military activities.
- The IDF said that it downed a Hezbollah drone prior to entering Israel.
- Lebanese media reported that Hezbollah shot down an Israeli drone over Tyre with an anti-aircraft missile. The IDF later confirmed that Hezbollah shot down one of its UAVs using an anti-aircraft missile.
- The IDF said Hezbollah militants fired explosive-laden drones towards its forces in Al-Qantara and accused the group of violating the truce. The IDF said that it struck surveillance equipment at a Hezbollah rocket-launching site in Kounin, saying that the equipment “posed a direct threat to the forces operating in the area.”
- The IDF released video claiming to show Hezbollah militants using ambulances for military activity.
- The UNIFIL said that a second Indonesian peacekeeper died due to injuries from an apparent Israeli attack.
- The IDF said that it killed six Hezbollah militants during clashes in Bint Jbeil and accused the group of violating the truce.
- Hezbollah said that it hit an Israeli Humvee in Al-Qantara in retaliation for alleged Israeli violations of the ceasefire.
- The IDF said that a canine from the Oketz Unit was killed after revealing the location of a Hezbollah cell in Bint Jbeil, adding that all six militants were killed within an hour and a half of their identification and accused the group of violating the truce.
- The IDF said that Hezbollah militants fired more explosive-laden drones that hit next to its forces in southern Lebanon and accused the group of violating the truce. It added that it attacked several Hezbollah rocket launchers in Yatar and Kafra, which are situated north of the Lebanese areas held by Israelis, saying that they “posed a threat to IDF troops and Israeli civilians".

=== 25 April ===
- An Israeli strike in southern Lebanon killed four people. The IDF said that those killed include three Hezbollah militants. The IDF said that Hezbollah launched two rockets towards Israel. The IDF added it had targeted loaded Hezbollah rocket launchers in three places in southern Lebanon and Radwan Force facilities. It restated its evacuation orders not to approach the Litani River area.
- The IDF said that it downed a "suspicious aerial target" in an area in southern Lebanon area where its forces operate.
- The IDF said that it hit "Hezbollah infrastructure" in its "buffer zone" in southern Lebanon.
- Prime Minister Benjamin Netanyahu's office said that he ordered the IDF to "vigorously strike" Hezbollah targets in Lebanon.
- Several drones were launched from Lebanon towards northern Israel.

=== 26 April ===
- The Lebanese health ministry said at least 13 people were killed in Israeli attacks in Lebanon in the previous 24 hours, increasing the Lebanese death toll according to its count since the start of the war to 2,509.
- The IDF ordered restrictions on movement in areas of southern Lebanon, and issued evacuation orders for several south Lebanon villages beyond its control, citing alleged truce violations by Hezbollah militants.
- The IDF announced that it targeted Hezbollah military structures in overnight strikes throughout southern Lebanon; explosive drones fired at its troops landed in open area.
- The IDF announced that the IAF downed three drones prior to entering northern Israel.
- The IDF announced that one of its soldiers was killed while six others were injured, including an officer and three troops who were critically injured, a soldier who was moderately injured and a soldier who was slightly injured in a Hezbollah drone attack in southern Lebanon.

=== 27 April ===
- The Lebanese health ministry said at least 11 people were killed in Israeli attacks in Lebanon in the previous 24 hours, increasing the Lebanese death toll according to its count since the start of the war to 2,521.
- Hezbollah leader Naim Qassem said that the group will not revert to the pre-March status and will respond to Israeli attacks.
- Four people including a woman were killed and 51 others, three of them children were injured in Israeli strikes in southern Lebanon.
- The IDF said that it lost contact with a drone fired from Lebanon at northern Israel.
- The IDF said it dismantled over 50 Hezbollah infrastructure sites in recent days, including one Hezbollah underground compound, and allegedly recovered an arms storage facility inside a children's room containing explosives, Kalashnikov rifles, grenades, RPGs, machine guns and ammunition and accused Hezbollah militants of exploiting Lebanese civilians for their activities. Separately, the IDF announced it downed a droned fired by Hezbollah militants fired an explosive drone towards its troops operating in southern Lebanon the previous day.
- The IDF said it killed three Hezbollah militants and hit its military structures in the vicinity of the front line in southern Lebanon.
- The IDF said it started conducting strikes against Hezbollah infrastructure in eastern Lebanon, expanding the scope of its bombing campaign during a truce. Security sources told Reuters that attacks hit in the vicinity of Nabi Chit.
- The IDF announced that its troops operating in the Israeli buffer zone in Lebanon were targeted by an "explosive drone" fired by Hezbollah, without causing casualties. Hezbollah said that it had targeted an Israeli tank in southern Lebanon using a drone.
- The IDF announced that it struck over 20 Hezbollah-linked arms manufacturing, storage and rocket firing sites sites throughout the Beqaa Valley and southern Lebanon.

=== 28 April ===
- The Lebanese health ministry said at least 13 people were killed in Israeli attacks in Lebanon in the previous 24 hours, increasing the Lebanese death toll according to its count since the start of the war to 2,534.

=== 29 April ===
- The Lebanese health ministry said at least 42 people were killed in Israeli attacks in Lebanon in the previous 24 hours, increasing the Lebanese death toll according to its count since the start of the war to 2,576.
- The Lebanese Army announced that a Lebanese ‌soldier and his ‌brother were killed in an Israeli attack ‌in Bint ‌Jbeil.

=== 30 April ===
- After a Hezbollah drone intrusion in Moshav Shomera, a car caught fire.
- The IDF said that Hezbollah shot down one of its drone with its missile in southern Lebanon. It added that its troops killed five Hezbollah militants who were operating near its forces on the previous day.
- The IDF issued evacuation orders for eight villages outside its "buffer zone" in southern Lebanon, citing "Hezbollah infrastructure". The IDF then said that it destroyed missile firing positions used by the group.
- A Hezbollah drone strike in Moshav Shomera injured 12 Israeli soldiers, two moderately and 10 slightly.
- The IDF issued evacuation orders for residents of 15 villages in the Nabatieh area, citing alleged Hezbollah militant activities. The IDF later announced that it carried out strikes on Hezbollah infrastructure.
- The IDF announced that one of its soldiers was killed and another soldier was moderately injured in a drone strike in southern Lebanon.
- The IDF announced that one of its officers and one of its noncommissioned officers were moderately injured after an explosive drone detonated in southern Lebanon.

== May 2026 ==
=== 4 May ===
- The Lebanese health ministry said at least 17 people were killed in Israeli attacks in Lebanon in the previous 24 hours, increasing the Lebanese death toll according to its count since the start of the war to 2,696.
- The IDF said it downed a drone in the vicinity of the Israel-Lebanon border.
- The IDF ordered to evacuate four residential areas in Tyre district, citing alleged truce violations by Hezbollah militants. It later said that it carried out strikes on Hezbollah infrastructure.
- The IDF said that it killed 10 armed Hezbollah militants in the last two days in several areas in the vicinity of its troops in southern Lebanon, adding that its multi-dimensional unit dismantled a loaded launch position and infrastructure used to store weapons, while the IAF also conducted strikes on Hezbollah infrastructure overnight after anti-tank fire was launched at its forces, without causing casualties.
- The IDF said that two soldiers from the Golani reconnaissance brigade were moderately injured during a clash with Hezbollah militants in southern Lebanon.
- The IDF ordered to evacuate six south Lebanon villages, citing alleged truce violations by Hezbollah militants.

=== 6 May ===
- The IDF said that it killed over 220 Hezbollah militants since 16 April.
- An Israeli strike was reported in Ghobeiry. The IDF said that it killed Ahmed Ghaleb Balout, the commander of the Radwan Force.
- Four people were killed in an Israeli strike in the Beqaa Valley.
- The IDF said it carried out strikes on Hezbollah targets in southern Lebanon, after ordering residents of 12 towns to evacuate.
- Hezbollah said that it carried out several operations against Israeli forces in southern Lebanon, as well as attacks on northern Israel.
- NNA reported that an Israeli strike hit a home in Ain Baal.
- Three Israeli strikes were reported in Dibbin.
- Lebanese media reported that Israeli fighter jets conducted three attacks in Nabatieh.
- At least 13 people were killed in Israeli strikes in southern and eastern Lebanon.

=== 7 May ===
- An Israeli soldier was caught desecrating a statue of the Virgin Mary in the Lebanese town of Debel by placing a cigarette in the statue's mouth. The IDF said it will take action when he is identified.
- Four Israeli soldiers were injured by an explosion in southern Lebanon.
- The IDF said that it killed over 85 Hezbollah militants and carried out strikes on 180 sites used by the group in the past week.

=== 8 May ===
- The Lebanese health ministry said at least 32 people were killed in Israeli attacks in Lebanon in the previous 24 hours, increasing the Lebanese death toll since the start of the war to 2,759.
- Four people including two women were killed in an Israeli strike in Toura.

=== 9 May ===
- The Lebanese health ministry said at least 39 people were killed in Israeli attacks in Lebanon in the previous 24 hours.

=== 10 May ===
- The Lebanese health ministry said at least 87 people were killed in Israeli attacks in Lebanon in the previous 48 hours, increasing the Lebanese death toll since the start of the war to 2,846.

=== 11 May ===
- The Lebanese health ministry said at least 23 people were killed in Israeli attacks in Lebanon in the previous 24 hours, increasing the Lebanese death toll since the start of the war to 2,869.

=== 12 May ===
- NNA reported that a Syrian man was killed and his wife was injured after an Israeli strike hit a motorcycle in Tyre's Hamadieh area.

=== 13 May ===
- The Lebanese health ministry said that Lebanese death toll since the start of the war increased to 2,896 including over 200 children.

=== 15 May ===
- An Israeli strike hit a civil defense ‌center in southern Lebanon, killing at least six ‌people including three paramedics and injuring 22 others.
- The IDF reported that a soldier of the Golani Brigade's 12th Battalion was killed the previous day when Hezbollah militants launched a mortar at his unit during combat in southern Lebanon.
- Another IDF soldier was killed by a Hezbollah drone in Lebanon.
- The truce was extended by Israel and Lebanon for another 45 days.

=== 18 May ===
- The Lebanese health ministry said that Lebanese death toll since the start of the war increased to 3,020.
- NNA reported that an Israeli strike on an apartment on the outskirts of Baalbek killed a PIJ commander and his 17-year-old daughter.

=== 19 May ===
- The Lebanese health ministry reported that 22 people were killed in Israeli attacks in the previous 24 hours, increasing the Lebanese death toll to 3,042.
- The IDF announced that a major was killed during combat in southern Lebanon, increasing the IDF death toll in southern Lebanon to 21.

=== 20 May ===
- The Lebanese health ministry reported that 31 people were killed in Israeli attacks in the previous 24 hours, increasing the Lebanese death toll to 3,073.
- Hezbollah reported that fighting between the group and an Israeli force consisting of tanks and infantry occurred in the vicinity of Haddatha.
- The IDF announced that a brigade commander (a colonel) was critically injured and a lieutenant colonel was slightly to moderately injured during combat due to a Hezbollah drone attack in southern Lebanon.

=== 21 May ===
- An IDF combat photographer was critically injured and six other soldiers were injured, three of them moderately and three others slightly in a Hezbollah drone attack during combat in southern Lebanon, increasing number of soldiers critically injured from its Operational Documentation Division since the start of the Gaza war to two.

=== 22 May ===
- The Lebanese health ministry reported that the death toll from Israeli attacks in Lebanon had risen to 3,111.

=== 23 May ===
- The IDF ordered to evacuate an area of Tyre. It later struck two structures in and around the city.
- The IDF announced that a soldier was killed, while two others were injured, one critically and one slightly by a Hezbollah drone in northern Israel near the border, increasing the IDF death toll since the start of the war in Lebanon to 22. Hezbollah later published a video of a night time drone strike on the soldiers in Iskandarounah.
- The Alma center reported that the Al-Risala Association showed rescue operations after Israel attacked a multi-barrel rocket launcher.

=== 24 May ===
- The Lebanese health ministry reported that the death toll from Israeli attacks in Lebanon had risen to 3,123.

=== 25 May ===
- The IDF reported that a sergeant of the Israeli Combat Engineering Corps was killed and another soldier was critically injured by a Hezbollah FPV drone in southern Lebanon, increasing the number of IDF personnel killed in Lebanon to 23.

=== 27 May ===
- The Lebanese health ministry reported that the death toll from Israeli attacks in Lebanon had increased to 3,213.
- The IDF reported that a female soldier of the Givati Brigade was killed and two reservists were injured, one critically and another moderately in a Hezbollah drone attack on a military position on the Israeli border, increasing the IDF death toll to 24.
- The IDF said that a projectile fired from Lebanon landed in an open area in Israel after sirens sounded in several areas in the north, but no casualties were reported.

=== 29 May ===
- The Lebanese health ministry reported that 142 people were killed in Israeli attacks in the past 72 hours, increasing the death toll in Lebanon to 3,355.
- Prime Minister Netanyahu announced that Israeli forces had crossed the Litani river and were operating in Beirut and the Bekaa Valley, in what he characterised as a “tactical victory”.

=== 30 May ===
- The Lebanese health ministry reported that at least 16 people were killed in Israeli attacks in the previous 24 hours, increasing the Lebanese death toll to 3,371.
- Hezbollah fired several rockets towards northern Israel including a barrage at Nahariya for the first time in three weeks, causing panic to people including children on a beach in the city. One rocket reached Karmiel, marking the furthest fire into Israel since the roughly month long ceasefire. Another barrage caused damage in Kiryat Shmona. The IDF said that it downed a "launch" which entered into northern Israel from Lebanon.

=== 31 May ===
- The Lebanese health ministry reported that at least 41 people were killed in Israeli attacks in the previous 24 hours, increasing the Lebanese death toll to 3,412.
- The IDF announced that a sergeant of the Givati Brigade was killed and four other soldiers were slightly injured after a Hezbollah drone attack on an IDF post in southern Lebanon, increasing the IDF death toll to 26.
- The IDF seized Beaufort Castle.

== June 2026 ==
=== 1 June ===
- The Lebanese health ministry reported that at least 21 people were killed in Israeli attacks in the previous 24 hours, increasing the Lebanese death toll to 3,433.
- The IDF announced that a sergeant of the Maglan Unit was killed and three others were injured, one critically, in a Hezbollah drone attack in southern Lebanon, increasing the IDF death toll to 27.
- Iran reportedly halted negotiations with US because of Israeli strikes in Lebanon.
- The IDF said that one of its medical officers was killed while seven soldiers were injured by a Hezbollah drone during combat in southern Lebanon.
- Israel agreed not to hit Beirut's southern suburbs, and Hezbollah agreed not to attack Israel as part of a US proposal, with the cease-fire framework to be expanded to include entire Lebanon.
- The IDF detected rocket launches towards the Galilee, the Golan, and IDF positions in Lebanon after President Trump announced the truce. Several Israeli strikes were also reported in Lebanon during the same time.

=== 2 June ===
- The Lebanese health ministry reported that at least 35 people were killed in Israeli attacks in the previous 24 hours, increasing the Lebanese death toll to 3,468.

=== 3 June ===
- The Lebanese health ministry reported that at least 48 people were killed in Israeli attacks in the previous 24 hours, increasing the Lebanese death toll to 3,516.
- Israel and Lebanon agreed to renew a ceasefire, mediated by the US, and plan to establish "pilot zones".

=== 4 June ===
- The Lebanese health ministry reported that at least 10 people were killed in Israeli attacks in the previous 24 hours, increasing the Lebanese death toll according to its count to 3,526.
- The IDF said that a Hezbollah attack hit IDF Northern Command chief Rafi Milo's car after he stepped out of the vehicle in southern Lebanon apparently sometime in the past several weeks, no casualties were reported.
- A Serbian peacekeeper was killed while two others were injured in a strike on a UNIFIL base in southern Lebanon.
- Hezbollah rejected the truce deal announced the previous day and instead demanded a comprehensive truce and full withdrawal of Israel from Lebanon.
- The IDF said a soldier of the 7th Armoured Brigade was killed when a Hezbollah militant launched an anti-tank missile on a tank north of the Litani River, increasing the IDF death toll in Lebanon to 29.

=== 6 June ===
- The Lebanese Health Ministry announced that the Lebanese death toll as a result of Israeli attacks had risen to 3,593.
- Three Lebanese soldiers were killed in an IDF attack on their car near Kfar Tebnit. The IDF said that the car was "moving suspiciously towards forces" and gunfire was reported in the area.
- The IDF announced that a Sergant of the Givati Brigade and a Captain of the Egoz Unit were killed in southern Lebanon, increasing the IDF death toll to 31.

=== 7 June ===
- The Lebanese Health Ministry reported that at least 20 people were killed in Israeli attacks in the previous 24 hours, increasing the Lebanese death toll to 3,613.
- The IDF announced that it downed two projectiles which entered from Lebanon.
- Lebanese state media said that an Israeli strike in the southern suburbs of Beirut killed two people and wounded 11 others. The IDF said that it targeted Hezbollah infrastructure after the group fired towards northern Israel.

=== 9 June ===
- The Lebanese Health Ministry reported that the death toll from Israeli attacks in Lebanon had risen to 3,666.
- A militant of unclear affiliation was killed after crossing into northern Israel from Lebanon and firing at IDF soldiers, causing no injuries.
- Israeli airstrikes in Tyre killed eight people and injured 32 others after the IDF issued an evacuation order for the entire city, including for the first time its Christian quarter due to alleged presence of Hezbollah militants. Four others were killed by strikes in Nabatieh.

=== 10 June ===
- The Lebanese Health Ministry reported that at least 30 people were killed in Israeli attacks in the previous 24 hours, increasing the Lebanese death toll to 3,696.
- Israeli strikes killed 17 people in southern Lebanon, including nine in Tayr Debba, three in Deir Qanoun an-Naher, two in Seddiqin, and one in Tyre. A strike on a car in central Sidon killed two others.

=== 11 June ===
- The Lebanese Health Ministry reported that at least 15 people were killed in Israeli attacks in the previous 24 hours, increasing the Lebanese death toll to 3,711.

=== 12 June ===
- The IDF said that it killed over 10 Hezbollah militants who served as field commanders and their successors in its strikes in southern Lebanon.

=== 13 June ===
- The Lebanese Health ministry announced that the death toll from Israeli strikes in Lebanon had reached 3,756.

=== 14 June ===
- The Lebanese Health Ministry reported that at least 27 people were killed in Israeli attacks in the previous 24 hours, increasing the Lebanese death toll to 3,783.
- An Israeli strike hit a five-story apartment building in the southern suburbs of Beirut, killing at least three people and injuring at least six others. Israel said that it launched strikes against Hezbollah targets in response to attacks on the country.
- Israel announced that it killed Ali Musa Daqduq, a senior Hezbollah commander responsible for the Karbala provincial headquarters raid that killed five American soldiers during the Iraq War in a strike in southern Lebanon over the weekend.

=== 15 June ===
- Pakistan, the primary mediator, stated that both the United States and Iran declared the "immediate and permanent termination of military operations on all fronts, including in Lebanon" as part of the agreement to end the 2026 Iran war. Israel stated that its forces will remain in Lebanon.
- Hezbollah said that it has not conducted any operations since the announcement of the agreement.
- One person was killed in an Israeli strike on a vehicle in southern Lebanon.

=== 16 June ===
- The Lebanese Health Ministry reported that at least 15 people were killed in Israeli attacks in the previous 24 hours, increasing the Lebanese death toll according to its count to 3,798.

=== 17 June ===
- The Lebanese Health Ministry reported that at least 28 people were killed in Israeli attacks in the previous 24 hours, increasing the Lebanese death toll according to its count to 3,826.
- The IDF said that Hezbollah drone attacks in southern Lebanon injured five soldiers, one seriously.
- The IDF reported that a soldier of the 36th Division was killed and 7 others were wounded by a Hezbollah IED in southern Lebanon near the Litani river, increasing the IDF death toll to 32.

=== 18 June ===
- The Lebanese Health Ministry reported that at least 58 people were killed in Israeli attacks in the previous 24 hours, increasing the Lebanese death toll according to its count to 3,884.

=== 19 June ===
- The Lebanese Health Ministry reported that at least 28 people were killed in Israeli attacks in the previous 24 hours, increasing the Lebanese death toll according to its count to 3,912.
- Lebanese turtle conservationist Mona Khalil's nonprofit announced that she died from serious injuries following an Israeli strike which hit her house in Mansouri. The IDF said that she was not a “target,” adding that “there is no known IDF strike in which she was injured.” It admitted, however, that strikes were carried out in the area around the village “after the IDF issued evacuation warnings.” Her assistant was also injured in the strike.
- The IDF reported that four soldiers of the 401st Brigade, including a Lieutenant-Colonel, were killed after Hezbollah targeted their tank with an explosive drone in the Lebanese village of Kfar Tebnit, increasing the IDF death toll to 36. Hours later, a drone strike in the same village injured five soldiers of the Oz Brigade, one seriously.
- The IDF said that it struck 80 sites in southern Lebanon and the Beqaa Valley in response to the fatal attack in Kfar Tebnit, killing dozens of militants. The Lebanese Health Ministry reported that at least 47 people were killed, including seven women and two children.
- President Trump announced a renewed ceasefire between Israel and Hezbollah.

=== 20 June ===
- The Lebanese Health Ministry reported that at least 83 people were killed in Israeli attacks in the previous 24 hours, increasing the Lebanese death toll according to its count to 4,057.
- The IDF said that Hezbollah violated the ceasefire by attacking its forces in Lebanon using 50 rockets. Hezbollah said that it attacked Israeli forces who tried to seize Ali al-Taher, Nabatieh. The IDF said that in response it struck dozens of Hezbollah targets. Lebanon’s Civil Defense said that 30 people were killed including civilians and several others were injured including civilians.
- Iran declared that it closed the Strait of Hormuz again due to Israeli strikes in Lebanon, describing them as a violation of its deal with the US, a claim denied by the US military.
- The IDF announced that a soldier of the Maglan Unit was killed and 13 others were injured in an overnight Hezbollah drone attack near Kfar Tebnit, increasing the IDF death toll to 37.

=== 21 June ===
- The Lebanese Health Ministry reported that at least 49 people were killed in Israeli attacks in the previous 24 hours, increasing the Lebanese death toll to 4,106 including 251 children.

=== 23 June ===
- The Lebanese Health Ministry reported that at least 17 people were killed in Israeli attacks in the previous 24 hours, increasing the Lebanese death toll according to its count to 4,192.

=== 24 June ===
- An Israeli Druze soldier of the 7th Armoured Brigade was killed and another soldier was wounded in an 'operational incident' in southern Lebanon.

=== 25 June ===
- The Lebanese Health Ministry reported that at least 19 people were killed in Israeli attacks in the previous 24 hours, increasing the Lebanese death toll according to its count to 4,230.
- Four Israeli soldiers were wounded by a grenade during a shootout with a Hezbollah militant in Beit Yahoun. The militant was killed after soldiers returned fire. The IDF added that six Hezbollah militants who "posed a threat" were killed in southern Lebanon.

=== 26 June ===
- The Lebanese Health Ministry reported that at least 13 people were killed in Israeli attacks in the previous 24 hours, increasing the Lebanese death toll according to its count to 4,243.
- US Secretary of State Marco Rubio announced a framework deal between Israel and Lebanon that aims to achieve "lasting peace and security" through US mediation. The agreement asks for a cease-fire, with Hezbollah agreeing to terminate all hostilities and withdraw from southern Lebanon. It was later rejected by Hezbollah.

=== 27 June ===
- NNA reported an Israeli strike in the Nabatieh region.

=== 28 June ===
- The Lebanese Health Ministry increased the Lebanese death toll according to its count to 4,246.
- The IDF announced that it killed several Hezbollah militants armed with RPGs in the vicinity of the IDF’s buffer zone in Nabatieh district. It also said it hit a rocket launcher in the area that posed a threat to its forces.
- The IDF announced that one of its soldiers was killed and another soldier was slightly injured in southern Lebanon the previous day.
- Prime Minister Benjamin Netanyahu and Defense Minister Israel Katz announced that the IDF dismantled Hezbollah's subterranean infrastructure in the Majdal Zone and informed the Trump administration in advance. They added that it was over 200 meters long and over 25 meters deep, contained hundreds of weapons and several firing shafts allegedly intended to attack Israel.

=== 29 June ===
- The Lebanese Health Ministry reported that at least 11 people were killed in Israeli attacks in the previous 24 hours, increasing the Lebanese death toll according to its count to 4,257.
- The IDF announced that it hit three Hezbollah command centers in Nabatieh and Mayfadoun the day before in retaliation to Hezbollah's alleged violations of the truce deal by attacking IDF forces operating in the latter’s buffer zone in Lebanon.
- The IDF announced that one of its reservists was critically injured in a blast in Beaufort Castle area.
- NNA reported that Israeli fighter jets conducted bombings on the area between Qantara and Deir Seryan.
- The IDF signed a $7 million contract for AI-powered radar to thwart Hezbollah drones.

=== 30 June ===
- The Lebanese Health Ministry reported that at least 21 people were killed in Israeli attacks in the previous 24 hours, increasing the Lebanese death toll according to its count to 4,278.
- Iran said that Iran, the US, and Lebanon have agreed to form a committee to oversee the end of the war in Lebanon.
- The IDF announced that it killed a Hezbollah militant who posed a threat to its forces in Manzala, in the vicinity of Nabatieh.

== July 2026 ==
=== 1 July ===
- The Lebanese Health Ministry reported that at least 19 people were killed in Israeli attacks in the previous 24 hours, increasing the Lebanese death toll according to its count to 4,297.

=== 3 July ===
- The IDF announced that one of its reservists was critically injured due to a "close-quarters encounter in southern Lebanon" the day before.
- The IDF announced that it hit roughly 10 Hezbollah infrastructure sites and a truck in southern Lebanon in retaliation to the group's alleged ceasefire breaches.

=== 4 July ===
- The Lebanese Health Ministry increased the Lebanese death toll due to Israeli attacks according to its count to 4,303.

=== 6 July ===
- The Lebanese Health Ministry increased the Lebanese death toll due to Israeli attacks since 2 March according to its count to 4,319.
- Lebanese Health Ministry reported that an Israeli strike hit a vehicle in Nabatieh al Fawqa, killing four people including at least two women.
- The IDF announced that it targeted four suspects who approached its security zone in southern Lebanon.

=== 8 July ===
- The IDF announced that it killed a Hezbollah militant at a building in the vicinity of Bint Jbeil in the IDF buffer zone in southern Lebanon.

=== 9 July ===
- The Lebanese Health Ministry increased the Lebanese death toll due to Israeli attacks since 2 March according to its count to 4,321.
- The IDF announced that it destroyed two tunnels with a combined length of roughly 200 m (660 ft) in Majdal Zoun and seized "dozens" of armaments.

=== 13 July ===
- The IDF published a visual of what it described as hidden Hezbollah tunnels beneath Beaufort Castle, where it said the group's command centres were situated.

=== 16 July ===
- Syria stated that it thwarted an attempt to transfer armaments to Hezbollah through Iraq.

=== 18 July ===
- The IDF stated that it hit a Hezbollah cell in the vicinity of Tebnit after it identified a Hezbollah UAV, accusing the group of breaching truce understandings.

=== 20 July ===
- The Lebanese Health Ministry increased the Lebanese death toll due to Israeli attacks since 2 March according to its count to 4,328.
- NNA reported a large-scale Israeli attack in Kfar Tebnit.
- The US announced that Israel handed over sections of its buffer zone in southern Lebanon to the Lebanese government as part of the 2026 Israel–Lebanon ceasefire.

=== 21 July ===
- Lebanon announced that the Lebanese army started deploying in Zawtar al-Gharbiyah following Israeli withdrawal from the town in accordance with the 2026 Israel–Lebanon ceasefire.
- The Lebanese army accused the IDF of opening fire towards its forces in a "pilot zone". The IDF stated that it fired "warning shots" after they crossed roughly 150 m (490 ft) into territory it occupied.

=== 24 July ===
- The Lebanese Health Ministry increased the Lebanese death toll due to Israeli attacks since 2 March according to its count to 4,330.

=== 26 July ===
- Lebanon's army accused the IDF of continuing to attack the country's south in breach of the ceasefire.

=== 29 July ===
- The IDF said that a Hezbollah drone attacked one of its engineering vehicles in southern Lebanon. Lebanese media, citing a local person, reported that the group hit the vehicle to prevent Israel from carrying out groundworks in the south of the country.

=== 30 July ===
- The IDF stated that it demolished a Hezbollah tunnel network sponsored by the Government of Iran in the Beaufort area.

== August 2026 ==
=== 1 August ===
- The IDF announced that one of its officers was moderately injured amidst an operational activity in Lebanon's south.

=== 2 August ===
- The 401st Brigade of the IDF claimed to have destroyed 1,200 Hezbollah tunnels, concluding their eight-month deployment.

=== 5 August ===
- The IDF said that two of its reservists were killed, and four were critically injured after being hit by an IED in Majdal Zoun. The IDF ordered to evacuate al-Mansouri, citing alleged "Hezbollah violations of truce". It later stated that it executed precision strikes in Lebanon's south. It later announced that it struck Hezbollah infrastructure.

=== 7 August ===
- Lebanon and Israel agreed on a shortlist of states that could send forces to verify Hezbollah disarmament.
- A Hezbollah drone struck in the vicinity of Israeli soldiers in the Ali Taher Ridge in Lebanon's south in an apparent Hezbollah breach of the truce.

=== 8 August ===
- The IDF said that one of its soldiers was moderately injured in an "operational accident" in Lebanon's south.
- Lebanon stated that Israeli soldiers crossed into Zawtar al-Gharbiyah and constructed an earthen barrier. The IDF stated that it was unaware of such an incident.

=== 9 August ===
- The Lebanese Health Ministry increased the Lebanese death toll due to Israeli attacks since 2 March according to its count to 4,335.

=== 11 August ===
- NNA reported that an Israeli drone attack targeted a vehicle on Nabatieh's outskirts, adding that an ambulance team from the Hezbollah-connected Islamic Health Authority, Islamic Message Scouts Association, and other medical staff was bombed in another attack while transporting a wounded individual in the area, injuring two people and damaging an ambulance. The IDF denied responsibility.

=== 12 August ===
- The IDF stated that it mistakenly fired an interceptor at its soldiers in Lebanon's south, without causing casualties.

=== 15 August ===
- Lebanese President Joseph Aoun and Lebanese media announced that an Israeli attack in Ansar killed seven people and injured three others, all members of same family including children and women. It also reported that a wave of attacks occurred in the Nabatieh area, including on the Ali Taher Ridge, under which Hezbollah has a large tunnel. The IDF stated that it was in retaliation to an alleged Hezbollah ceasefire violation, in which three of its soldiers were critically injured. It added that a Redwan Force battalion commander was killed in the strike and accused him of using own family as human shelds in the Redwan headquarters.
- An Israeli strike in Deir ez-Zahrani killed four people.

=== 16 August ===
- Lebanese media declared that Israeli attacks hit Ali Taher Ridge area in the country's south.
- The IDF announced that it killed a Hezbollah’s Badr regional division's senior commander in a strike in Deir al-Zahrani the previous day.

=== 17 August ===
- UNIFIL stated that Israeli flags on a Lebanese street breach United Nations Security Council Resolution 1701.

=== 20 August ===
- The US imposed sanctions against Hezbollah, citing its actions on behalf of the Government of Iran.

=== 21 August ===
- The IDF stated that it hit a structure in Baraashit after suspects "posing threat" entered there.

=== 27 August ===
- The IDF accused Hezbollah of firing two explosive UAVs towards its soldiers in Ali Taher Ridge, adding that it hit Hezbollah munitions storage facilities after the attack. NNA reported that Israel attacks in Arabsalim killed a woman and injured others.

=== 28 August ===
- The Lebanese Health Ministry increased the Lebanese death toll due to Israeli attacks since 2 March according to its count to 4,352.

=== 29 August ===
- Lebanese media reported that Israel conducted an attack in Nabatieh al-Fawqa.

=== 30 August ===
- Lebanese media reported that Israeli strikes hit Yohmor.

== September 2026 ==
=== 2 September ===
- The IDF stated that Hezbollah fired two drones towards its soldiers in south Lebanon's Ali Taher Ridge overnight, adding that the group’s facilities were hit in retaliation.

=== 3 September ===
- Prime Minister Netanyahu announced that five Lebanese civilians were released by Israel in exchange for information on Jewish remains in Lebanon.

=== 4 September ===
- NNA reported that two people traveling in a bike were killed in an Israeli strike in Nabatieh.
- The IDF stated that it launched strikes on Hezbollah targets after an explosive UAV was fired at its forces in Lebanon's south. The Lebanese Health Ministry stated that those attacks killed three people and wounded 23 others including medics, children and women.

=== 6 September ===
- The IDF stated that it launched strikes on targets in Lebanon's south after Hezbollah fired two explosive UAVs toward its soldiers deployed in the Ali Taher Ridge, describing it as a truce breach by Hezbollah militants. It later issued an evacuation order for Arabsalim, saying that a structure in the town is owned by Hezbollah. Lebanon's Health Ministry announced that four people were killed and 20 others were injured in those attacks, adding that a hospital was destroyed in an Israeli strike in the vicinity of the Ridge.
- Lebanese media reported that an Israeli strike in Nabatieh killed three people.

=== 7 September ===
- The IDF ordered to evacuate a specific area in Deir al-Zahrani, saying that its target is a facility used by Hezbollah militants. Israeli strikes were later reported in the region. NNA reported that separate Israeli strikes in Lebanon's south killed at least 11 people including two children and two paramedics with the Amal Movement-affiliated Risala Scouts and injured five others.
- The IDF stated that Hezbollah fired explosive UAVs at its soldiers in Ali Taher Ridge area for the third time in seven days, triggering strikes targeting militants in retaliation.
- The IDF stated that two of its soldiers were slightly injured in a clash with a Hezbollah militant who was killed in the vicinity of Beaufort Castle.

=== 10 September ===
- Prime Minister Netanyahu announced that the IDF destroyed a strategic subterranean Hezbollah complex at the Ali Taher Ridge using more than 1,000 tons of TNT (4,200 GJ) of explosives to destroy tunnels stretching 2 kilometres (1.2 mi) underneath the ridge and setting off tremors that measured 4.1 on the Richter scale.

=== 13 September ===
- NNA reported that Israel conducted strikes in the vicinity of Nabatieh al-Fawqa and Tel al-Dabsha.

=== 17 September ===
- The Lebanese Health Ministry increased the Lebanese death toll due to Israeli attacks since 2 March according to its count to 4,386.

=== 19 September ===
- The IDF announced that it hit Hezbollah targets after the latter's explosive device slightly injured two of its soldiers in its buffer zone in Lebanon's south.

=== 25 September ===
- The IDF stated that it fired an interceptor against a “suspicious aerial target” spotted above a south Lebanon area where its soldiers are deployed.

=== 26 September ===
- The IDF stated that it bombed a Hezbollah munitions cache to "remove a threat" to its soldiers deployed in its security zone in Lebanon's south.

=== 27 September ===
- The IDF stated that Hezbollah targeted its soldiers operating in its buffer zone in Lebanon's south with an explosive drone, triggering strikes on the latter's sites in retaliation.

=== 28 September ===
- The IDF announced completion of a major operation to dismantle Hezbollah facilities in Al-Mansouri, a town situated inside its security zone in Lebanon's south.
- The IDF stated that it fired an interceptor against a "suspicious aerial target" above its soldiers in Lebanese territory.

== October 2026 ==
=== 3 October ===
- The IDF announced that eight of its soldiers were slightly injured after two vehicles crashed into each other in Rab Thalathin.

=== 4 October ===
- The IDF announced that one of its soldiers was critically injured and another was moderately wounded due to an accidental grenade explosion in Lebanon's south.

=== 7 October ===
- The IDF reported that it launched an interceptor at a "false target" in Lebanon's south.
- The UNIFIL stated that gunfire hit its base in the vicinity of Kfar Shouba.

=== 8 October ===
- The IDF declared that one of its soldiers were killed and three others were injured after a vehicle overturned amidst operational activity in Lebanon's south.

=== 10 October ===
- The IDF declared that it fired an interceptor targeting a "suspicious aerial target" in Lebanon's south.

=== 11 October ===
- NNA and a local mayor reported that two people were killed in Lebanon's south, one by an Israeli attack and the other by an unexploded ordnance left by the war, as they participated in the yearly olive harvest.
- The IDF declared that it targeted a "suspicious aerial target" in Lebanon's south with an interceptor.

=== 12 October ===
- The IDF announced that it fired an interceptor against a suspicious target in Lebanon's south.

=== 15 October ===
- The IDF stated that it used an interceptor following "false identification" in a region of south Lebanon where its soldiers are deployed.

=== 16 October ===
- The IDF reported that interceptors were utilized against "false target" above its soldiers in Lebanon's south.

=== 25 October ===
- The IDF announced that it used an interceptor towards a target above Lebanon's south.

=== 28 October ===
- The IDF announced that it deployed an interceptor against a suspicious target above Lebanon's south.

== November 2026 ==
=== 4 November ===
- One paramedic with the Amal movement’s Risala Scouts was killed and another person was wounded in an Israeli strike that hit a motorcycle in Lebanon's south. Israel announced that it targeted suspects who were “observing IDF troops.”

=== 8 November ===
- The IDF stated that it discovered munitions and facilities used by Hezbollah in the vicinity of the UNIFIL sites in Lebanon's south including from a civilian house.

=== 9 November ===
- Lebanese media announced that Israel attacks hit Qantara and Kfar Tebnit.

=== 10 November ===
- The UNIFIL reported that "about a dozen round" were fired at one of its patrols in the region of Wadi Jilu.

=== 15 November ===
- The IDF reported that it destroyed a Hezbollah tunnel in Majdal Zoun.

=== 16 November ===
- Lebanese media reported an Israeli strike in an area near the country's border with Syria. The IDF stated that the strike was intended to disrupt a munitions shipment for Hezbollah.
- NNA reported that the IDF apprehended two Lebanese men from their house on the outskirts of Shebaa, accusing the latter of "ransacking its contents and damaging belongings.”

=== 18 November ===
- The IDF stated that it dismantled subterranean Hezbollah infrastructure in the Shebaa Farms.

=== 19 November ===
- Lebanese media reported Israeli strikes in al-Sha’ra area of Beqaa Valley, which the IDF described as targeting the entrances to a Hezbollah missile site.
