= Mhabib =

Village destroyed during the Israel–Hamas war

- Village
- Interactive map of Mhabib
- Coordinates: 33°09′15″N 35°30′13″E

Mhabib (or also Muhajbib, Muheibib or Neby Muheibîb) was a village in Southern Lebanon located in the Marjayoun District, in the Nabatieh Governorate, between the municipalities of Blida and Mays el Jabal.

== History ==
The village is mentioned in an early census by the Palestine Exploration Fund in 1881, described as a small village populated by about seventy Muslims. Inside the village there was a small shrine dedicated to the Prophet Benjamin.

In 2024, the 7012th Battalion of the 3rd "Alexandroni" Brigade of the Israeli Ground Forces detonated the village, suspecting that it was a Hezbollah combat management center.
