= Blat, Marjayoun =

Blat بلاط
- Municipality
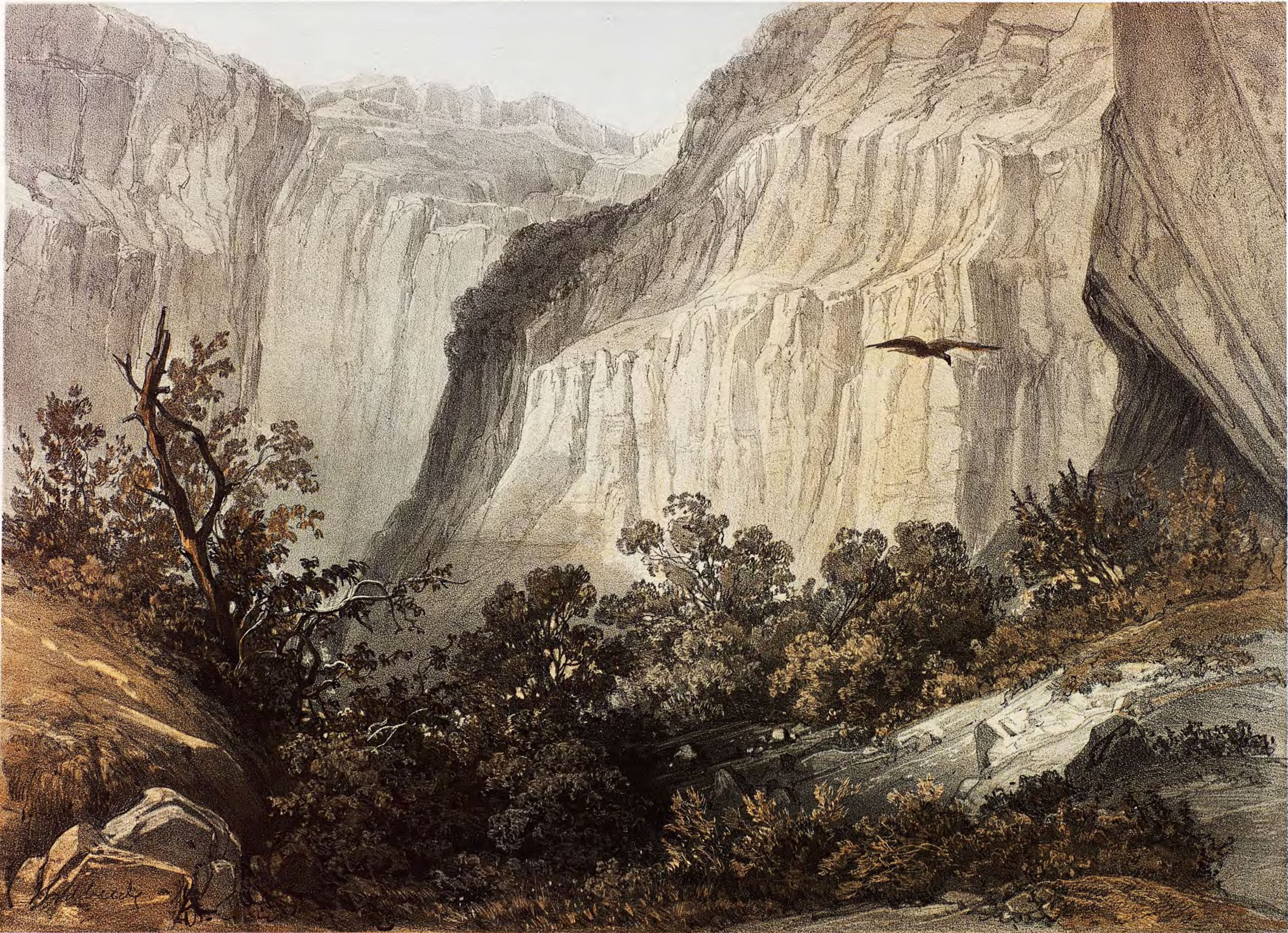
- Ravine, in the Litani River by Blat, ca 1851, by van de Velde

- Location within Lebanon
- Coordinates: 33°23′10″N 35°36′02″E
- Grid position: 136/161 L
- Country: Lebanon
- Governorate: Nabatieh Governorate
- District: Marjayoun District
- Elevation: 680 m (2,230 ft)
- Time zone: UTC+2 (EET)
  - Summer (DST): UTC+3 (EEST)
- Dialing code: +961

Blat (Arabic: بلاط, romanized: Blāṭ) is a municipality in the Marjayoun District in southern Lebanon, located just north of Marjayoun.

== History ==
In 1596, it was named as a village, Balat, in the Ottoman nahiya (subdistrict) of Tibnin under the liwa' (district) of Safad, with a population of 56 households and 2 bachelors, all Muslim. The villagers paid a fixed tax-rate of 25 % on agricultural products, such as wheat, barley, olive trees, vineyards, goats, beehives; in addition to occasional revenues, a press for olive oil or grape syrup and a water mill; a total of 6,000 akçe.

In 1838, Eli Smith noted Blat's population as being Metawileh.

On 27 December 1993, during the Israeli occupation of southern Lebanon, a Norwegian soldier was killed when an Israeli tank, stationed in neighbouring Aishiyeh, fired on his UNIFIL patrol outside Blat. The Indian Army contingent with UNIFIL had a small base camp in the village.

== Demographics ==
In 2014 Muslims made up 88.35% and Christians made up 11.13% of registered voters in Blat. 84.89% of the voters were Shiite Muslims.

== Bibliography ==
- Hütteroth, W.-D.; Abdulfattah, K. (1977). Historical Geography of Palestine, Transjordan and Southern Syria in the Late 16th Century. Erlanger Geographische Arbeiten, Sonderband 5. Erlangen, Germany: Vorstand der Fränkischen Geographischen Gesellschaft. ISBN 3-920405-41-2.
- Rhode, H. (1979). Administration and Population of the Sancak of Safed in the Sixteenth Century. Columbia University. Archived from the original on 2019-04-20.
- Robinson, E.; Smith, E. (1841). Biblical Researches in Palestine, Mount Sinai and Arabia Petraea: A Journal of Travels in the year 1838. Vol. 3. Boston: Crocker & Brewster.
