= 2026 attack on UNIFIL post in Aadchit al-Qusayr =

Series of military attacks in South Lebanon

2026 Israel attack on UNIFIL post in Aadchit El Qsair
- Part of the 2026 Lebanon war
- Location of Aadshit al-Qusayr in South Lebanon
- Location: Aadshit al-Qusayr and Bani Haiyyan, South Lebanon
- Date: 29–30 March 2026
- Target: (United Nations) UNIFIL Indonesian Garuda Contingent
- Attack type: Artillery attack and convoy explosion
- Weapons: Artillery, projectiles, and explosive devices
- Deaths: 3 Indonesian soldiers: 1 in shelling on 29 March; 2 in vehicle explosion on 30 March
- Injuries: 5 Indonesian soldiers

On 29–30 March 2026, a series of attacks were carried out in the Aadshit al-Qusayr and Bani Hayyan areas of South Lebanon, involving positions and personnel of the United Nations Interim Force in Lebanon (UNIFIL). The incident resulted in the deaths of three peacekeepers from Indonesia and injured several others, sparking international condemnation and calls for an investigation by the United Nations (UN). The attack on 29 March, according to the UN, was carried out by Israel by firing a tank shell at a known UNIFIL location. The convoy explosion on March 30, on the other hand, was "most probably" caused by a tripwire-activated explosive device planted by Hezbollah.

== Attack ==
On 29 March 2026, an artillery projectile exploded near the Indonesian UNIFIL contingent's position in Aadchit El Qsair. The explosion killed one Indonesian National Armed Forces (TNI) soldier and injured several others.

On 30 March 2026, two more UNIFIL peacekeepers from Indonesia were killed by a "roadside explosion" near Bani Hayyan.

== Victims ==
The victims killed in this incident were three TNI personnel serving with the UNIFIL mission:

- Captain Zulmi Aditya Iskandar
- Sergeant First Class Muhammad Nur Ichwan
- Sergeant First Class Farizal Rhomadhon

Sergeant First Class Farizal Rhomadhon was killed on March 29. The two other men were killed on March 30.

In addition, several other personnel sustained injuries, including serious and minor injuries, some of whom were evacuated to medical facilities in Beirut for further treatment.

== Responsibility and investigation ==
UNIFIL stated that it is conducting an investigation to determine the cause and those responsible. The Indonesian government and several international parties have urged a thorough and transparent investigation. The Indonesian Ministry of Foreign Affairs emphasized that the safety of UN peacekeepers must be respected, in accordance with international law.

Shrapnel was recovered from the site, and the investigation concluded that the UNIFIL peacekeeper killed on 29 March was killed by a 120 mm shell fired by an Israeli tank.

However, the deaths on 30 March – when one vehicle in a UNIFIL convoy was hit by an explosion – are believed by the UN to have been caused by a tripwire-activated explosive device planted by Hezbollah, because another explosive device of this kind was found nearby.

== International reactions ==
UN Secretary-General António Guterres through his spokesperson, strongly condemned the incident and expressed condolences to the families of the victims and the Indonesian government. He also called on all parties to comply with international law and ensure the safety of UN personnel. Speaking at the UN Security Council, Indonesian Ambassador to the UN, Umar Hadi, demanded a full, prompt, and transparent investigation into the deaths of UNIFIL soldiers. The Indonesian representative also called on all parties to respect Lebanon's territorial integrity, cease aggression, and comply with international law.

The UN Security Council also strongly condemned the attack and emphasized that peacekeepers should not be targeted. The Council also called for full protection of UNIFIL personnel and facilities and supported an investigation into the incident. Furthermore, several countries and international organizations, including the World Health Organization (WHO), expressed concern over the increasing number of civilian and medical casualties in the escalating conflict in southern Lebanon.

Israeli Ambassador to the UN Danny Danon blamed Hezbollah for the killings of the Indonesian peacekeepers and claimed that the IDF did not fire into the Indonesian position. Umar Hadi dismissed Israeli's reasoning as an excuse.

== Impact ==
This incident raised concerns about the safety of UN peacekeeping personnel in active conflict zones. Furthermore, the incident sparked debate in Indonesia regarding the continued participation of the Indonesian National Armed Forces (TNI) in the UNIFIL mission. Several Indonesian parliamentarians proposed an evaluation, possibly even a troop withdrawal, from Lebanon, while the government emphasized the importance of continuing to contribute to international peacekeeping missions while prioritizing personnel safety.

Indonesian President Prabowo Subianto strongly condemned the attack on Indonesian troops in Lebanon and called for stricter protection and oversight standards for Indonesian troops in Lebanon. Former President Yudhoyono also noted the situation on the ground regarding the increasingly aggressive Israeli forces on the Lebanese border, leading to their exit from the designated border zone, rendering the peacekeeping force irrelevant and turning it into a war zone.

Former Governor of Jakarta and 2024 presidential candidate Anies Baswedan strongly condemned the attacks, stating that Guterres' condolences is "not enough". He states that the incident itself is deliberately made by Netanyahu's regime and called for the international community to act together.

== See also ==
- United Nations Interim Force in Lebanon
- Israel–Hezbollah conflict (2023–present)
- 2026 Lebanon war
