= George Jordac =

Lebanese author and poet (1931–2014)

George Gordac
- Born: George Gordac; 1931; Marjayoun, French Lebanon
- Died: November 5, 2014 (aged 82–83)
- Occupations: Poet, writer
- Writing career
- Language: Arabic
- Period: 1949–2014
- Notable work: The Voice of Human Justice (Sautu'l 'Adalati'l Insaniyah)

George Jordac (Arabic: جورج جرداق; 1931 – 2014) was a Lebanese author and poet. He published a book about Ali entitled The Voice of Human Justice.

Jordac hails from south Lebanon village of Marjayoun. He attended a local school for his primary education. Thereafter, he moved to Beirut for further study. In 1950, George published his first book while he was still a teenager titled “Wagner and the Woman”. He started his career as a journalist, working in several magazines. He also taught Arabic literature and philosophy in several universities.

In the introduction of the Trouble with Christianity, Philip Voerding who has written the book expresses that "The Voice of Human Justice written by an Eastern Christian named George Jordac. Theodicy was the most important belief in 12er Shia ideology after the oneness of God. I found this to be impressive".

== Early life ==
George Jordac was born in 1931 in the town of Al-Jadida in the Marjayoun area, in southern Lebanon.. Marjayoun consists of two words "Marj" and "Ayoun" (springs), the place where the springs come up. It has many springs. The people of the village are lovers of literacy.

== Education ==
He finished his primary education in a school in this area. As a child, he read Nahj al-Balagha, the Diwan (poetry-collection) of Al-Mutanabbi, and Majma' al-baḥrayn by Nasif al-Yaziji. He learned about Nahj al-balagha from his brother Fuad Jordac (an engineer, philologist, and poet). He always escaped from school and went to the side of these spring. The school principal and teachers were always looking after him and every day complained about him to his family. In his family, only his brother, Foad Jordac, supported him. When he was 13 years old, George had memorized much of Nahj al-balagha and the other two books. When Jordac was about 14 years old, he composed the play titled Sunrise. The play was performed at some villages in the south of Lebanon. At this time one of their friends, Mansoor Jordac, decided to send him to Europe for studying Math, but George refused. He came to Beirut and studied Arabic literature at the College of the Church. While George was only 18 years old, he wrote his first literary works that named "Wagner and woman".

After he graduated from the university, George taught Arabic literature and Arabic philosophy in some schools and universities in Beirut, and at the same time, he translated and wrote some articles for Lebanese newspapers and magazines. He wrote in newspapers such as Al-jumhuri al-jadid, Al-hurriyya, al-ṣayyād, Al-shabaka, Nisā', Al-kafaḥ al-'arabī, Al-amn, and some Arabic newspapers printed in Paris, and for two years in Al-watan and Al-ra'y al-ām, both printed in Kuwait. In 1960, George made up his mind to write the encyclopedia about Ali ibn Abi Talib and named it "Ali, The Voice of Human Justice".

He died on November 5, 2014.

== Works ==
- Imam 'Ali, the voice of human justice, in five volumes:

'Ali and human rights
'Ali and the French revolution
'Ali and Socrates
'Ali and his time
'Ali and the Arabs

- Palaces and Slums
- Saladin and Richard the Lion Heart (a historical novel in about 1000 pages)
- The Arabic genius
- Girls and mirrors
- The faces of Koton
- Donkey talks
- The Paris chaos
- An adventure and thieves (a play)
- The singer
- The governor
- Imru' al-Qais and the world
- Noonday stars
- Cabarets talks
- I am oriental (poems)
- The displaced (a translation of Maxim Gorky's book)
- A translation of Mao Zedong's poems
- A translation of Maxim Gorky's My fellow.
- Wagner and the woman
- Masterpieces of Nahj al-Balagha
