= The Voice of Human Justice =

1956 book by George Jordac

- Author: George Jordac
- Original title: "Sautu'l 'Adālati'l Insaniyah (صوت العدالة الإنسانية)
- Translator: M. Fazal Haq
- Language: Arabic
- Genre: Historical, religious
- Publisher: Ansariyan Publications (Qum)
- Publication date: 1956 (Arabic version)
- Publication place: Lebanon
- Media type: Print (hardback & paperback)
- Pages: 499 (first published edition)
- ISBN: 978-0-941724-24-1

The Voice of Human Justice (ISBN 978-964-438-158-4) is an English translation of Sautu'l 'Adālati'l Insaniyah (صوت العدالة الإنسانية), a book written in Arabic by George Jordac, a Christian author from Lebanon. The book is a biography of Ali ibn Abi Talib. The contents of the book were drawn from the Nahj al-Balagha of Ali.

The book depicts the personality of Ali. It also analyses the character of Ali. According to Jordac, Nahj al-Balagha has implications relating to socio-economic justice. The first edition of the Arabic version was published in 1956. The book has been translated into English, Spanish, French, Persian and several other languages.

== Author ==
George Jordac was a Christian author who, in his own words, spent four decades researching and studying Ali. The results of his research are a few volumes of books about Ali. He began his writing career in 1950 as a journalist for the newspapers Al-Anwar, Al-Kifah Al-Arabi, Al-Qabas and several others.

== The content of the book ==
This book is written in five volumes with the following titles:

=== Ali and Human Rights ===
This chapter includes a 256-page overview of the culture of the Hejaz, as it pertains to family life, ethics, religion, and science.

=== Ali and the French Revolution ===
This chapter contains 256 pages. It investigates the root causes and history of the French Revolution, and compares it with the views and principles of Imam Ali. The author argues that Imam Ali's views encompass four principles of the French Revolution.

=== Ali and Socrates ===
In this volume, the author explains views of Socrates and Ali.

=== Ali and his life ===
This chapter contains 254 pages. It includes a review and introduction of two tribes, the Umayyad and the Hashemi, and presents events during the rule of Ali.

=== Ali and ethnicity Arabic ===
This chapter contains 270 pages. It includes views of Al-Maʿarri, Gibran Khalil Gibran, Mikhail Naima and some orientalists' views about Ali.

The section titled "What has been said about the book" presents comments on and appreciation of the book.
