= Issam Mahfouz =

Lebanese playwright author, writer, and critic (1939–2006)

- Born: 1939 September 12
- Died: 2006 February 3

Issam Abdel-Masih Mahfouz (also written 'Isam/Essam Mahfood/Mahfuz') (12 September 1939 – 3 February 2006) was a Lebanese playwright, poet, journalist, author, translator, and critic. His literary works include dozens of books on politics, culture, and theater, as well as “dialogues” - imagined exchanges with historical figures. During his lifetime he was also well known as a Professor of Dramatic Arts at the Lebanese University and for his writing in the Lebanese newspaper al-Nahār, particularly its culture section.

Mahfouz is best known for his call to reform theater in the Arab world. In 1968 he published “The First Theater Manifesto” in which he proposed changing the language used in the theater from classical Arabic (Modern Standard Arabic or fuṣ’ḥa) to the local dialect to reflect the language of the street as “it is closer to the hearts of the people”. He also called for the themes of theatrical pieces to be international rather than local. In 1991 he altered his language proposal from the use of the local dialect to the development of a hybrid form of fuṣ’ḥa that would be comprehensible throughout the Arab world while still retaining the immediacy of the dialect. He subsequently translated all his plays into this “popular fuṣ’ḥa” (al-fuṣ’ḥa al-sha’abīyah). Mahfouz's own plays met immediate critical and popular success, and inaugurated a new era of theatrical production in the Arab world. Most recently, his play "The Dictator" was awarded the Sultan Award at the Arab Theater Film Festival in Doha in 2013. A translated version of “The Dictator” was selected by the Between the Seas Festival in New York for 2015 production.

== Family background ==
Mahfouz was born on September 12, 1939, in the southern Lebanese town of Jdeideh Marjeyoun, to a culturally active Christian family. His mother, Monifa Shadid, was a schoolteacher before marriage. His grandfather Eid managed a popular brass band that played music during ceremonies. His father, Abdel-Masiḥ, was educated in Jerusalem and began producing plays in Marjayoun with the backing of his brother Ramez, although he earned his living as a dentist. In the 1930s, the brothers introduced cinema to the region with the establishment of the Haramoun Cinema and Theater in Marjayoun which drew audiences from the entire region, including Syria and Palestine. Abdel-Masiḥ was also one of the founders of ‘The Marjayoun Awakening’ (al-Nahḍah al-Marj’āyūnīyah), a weekly newspaper focused on socio-economic conditions in the country. In 1937 he published “Symbolism”, a comparative account of western symbolism and eastern symbolism, with the latter embodied in the writings of al-Sharif al-Radi. It was one of the first books to discuss symbolism in Arabic literature.

The family home in Marjayoun hosted many poets and critics, including Ahmad al-Safi al Najafi, Bchara Al-Khoury, Amin Nakhle, Ameen Rihani, Sheikh Abdul-Hussein Sadek, Sheikh Abdul-Hussein Sharafeddine, Bulus Salameh, Ahmed Aref el-Zein, Suleiman Daher, al-Sayyed Mohsen al-Amin, and many others. Abdel-Masiḥ himself wrote classical Arabic poetry and was known as the "Nightingale of the South" (Bulbul al-Januub.)

== Childhood ==
Mahfouz spent most of his childhood in his hometown, Marjayoun. However, the period was marked by several displacements of his family to different regions in Lebanon as conflicts, including World War II and the Israel-Palestine war, affected Marjayoun significantly. Mahfouz's childhood was also affected by the death of close family members, including his mother at the age of two. Mahfouz finished school in Marjayoun. He showed an early inclination for theater by writing and producing plays in the attic of the family home, using accessories from the Haramoun Cinema and Theater. Friends and neighbors were invited to play different roles in his productions but he reserved the main character for himself. His childhood plays, with titles like “The Prisoner” and “The Wheat Seller”, revolved around the same issues he went on to develop in his adult productions: love, justice, and freedom.

== Early beginnings ==
In 1957 Mahfouz moved to Beirut to continue his education and fulfill his ambitions. He had already written his first collection of poetry, “Ashya’a Mayta” (Dead Things) which he published privately in 1959 and from which selected poems were modified and published in a 1961 collection of poetry, “'Ashab Al-Ṣayf” (Summer Weeds). In 1958, Mahfouz met the poet Shawki Abu Shaqra, who in turn introduced him to Yussuf Al-Khal, the founder of “Majallat Shi’ir” (Poetry Magazine), a publication about modern poetry in the Arab world in which Mahfouz published some of his poems and was a member of its editorial board from 1958 to 1964 when the magazine temporarily ceased publication and from 1967 to 1970 when it was revived. He produced two further poetry collections, “Al-Sayf Wa-Burj al-Adhra” (“The Sword and the Sign of Virgo”) and “al-Mawt al-Awwal” (“The First Death”) in 1963 and 1967 respectively. His poems were written in the modern free verse that was being introduced into the Arabic literary scene at the time. After the Arab defeat in the Six Day War, Mahfouz abruptly stopped writing poetry. He claimed that poetry “prevents us from seeing the dagger pointed at our hearts”. Once he had moved to France in 1975 he began writing prose poetry drawing on the image of Abd al-Rahman I, the founder of the Umayyad dynasty of Spain who was known as “The Entrant”. Mahfouz wrote as “The Leaver”, which in Arabic means "the rebel" or a "member of the Khawarij", dissidents of early Islam.

== Theater work ==
Mahfouz turned his hand to playwriting as he saw it as an effective medium of communication with audiences. He completed his first play “al-Zinzalakht” (“The Chinaberry”) Theater of Lebanon in 1963, but it met with resistance from the theater industry due to its use of colloquial Arabic. In protest he wrote pantomimes. “al-Zinzalakht” wasn't performed until 1968 under the direction of Berge Vassilian. In 1967 after the Arab defeat Mahfouz wrote “al-Qatl” (“The Killing”) but the Lebanese government prohibited its opening on the first anniversary of the defeat. The play was published in the magazine Fikr in 1969 with some modification of names. It was the only play he wrote in fuṣ’ḥa as it was a documentary using real quotations, not a literary work. During this same period, he translated and adapted "Waiting for Godot" by Samuel Beckett in 1967 and saw it produced at Masrah Beirut. In the same year he translated the novel "L'Amante Anglaise" by Marguerite Duras and turned it into a radio play of seven installments which was published in the newspaper "al-Hasna" and was directed by Shakib Khoury for Lebanese radio. Later, Marguerite Duras herself turned her novel into a play. Other major plays Mahfouz wrote include “al-Diktātūr” (“The Dictator”) 1969,“Carte Blanche” 1970, “Limāthā” (“Why?”) 1971, and “al-Ta’arīyah”(“Nakedness”) 2003, in addition to short plays. In keeping with his belief that art must be political, his plays are noted for their mordant social commentary, humanist perspective, and occasional surrealism. His plays won several awards, including at the Damascus Festival for Arabic Theater Arts in 1970 and Said Akl Award in 1968 for “al-Zinzalakht”. He served on the jury of a number of festivals, including al-Hamamet in Tunis in 1973. In 1974 he wrote a thirteen segment documentary series for Channel 7 in Lebanon about Lebanese theater from 1850 to 1950. His renown was such that in his article on Mahfouz, Yasmin Rifa'i noted: “Issam Mahfouz was one of five Arab playwrights lauded in the International German Encyclopedia under the auspices of the Institute of Theatrical Sciences in Vienna.”

== Journalism ==
Mahfouz wrote for several publications beginning in 1959, but he is best known for his work at al-Nahar where he wrote for the cultural section from 1966 to 1996. In 1975, he moved with al-Nahar's regional and international sections to Paris, due to the civil war in Lebanon. He was introduced to Western intellectual and cultural circles in Paris whose personalities he interviewed for his paper. While in Paris, he enrolled in l’Ecole des Hautes Etudes en Sciences Sociale and earned his diplôme under Jacques Berque. His thesis was entitled “Trotskyism and Surrealism in the Arab World between the World Wars”.

== Criticism ==
Mahfouz wrote several books critical of the West, including "An Arab Critic in Paris" (ناقد عربي في باريس Nāqid Arabī Fī Bārīs) 1980, for which he was labeled an 'Occidentalist'. He also wrote theater criticism of which the most prominent include "Theater is the Future of Arabic" (المسرح مستقبل العربية al-Masraḥ Mustaqbal al-Arabīyah) 1991, and "Playwright and Theater" (مسرحي والمسرح Masraḥī w-al-Masraḥ) 1995.

== Dialogues ==
Mahfouz wrote a number of imaginary dialogues with prominent historical figures including Ibn Arabi, Ibn Rushd, Ibn Khaldun, Jabr ibn Hayyan, Abul ‘Ala Al-Ma’arri, Abd al-Rahman Al Kawakibi, Mohammed ibn Zakariya al-Razi, and Ahmad Faris Shidyaq which were published in book form. They read like plays in potential form.

== Death ==
In June 2005 Issam was admitted to the hospital after a cerebral stroke. He was partially paralyzed, but insisted on using his left hand to complete four books: al-A’māl al-Masraḥīyah, Tab’a Munaqah wa Mazid (The Dramatic Works with Additions and Revisions); Asātithātuna Fī al-Qarn al-‘Ishrīn (Our Teachers in the 20th Century); al-A’mal al-Shi’rīyah (Poetic Works), Dar al-Farabi, 2016; Riḥla Thaqafīyah fī Sab’īnat al-Qarn al-‘ishrīn Bayn al-Sharq wa-al-Maghrib (A Cultural Voyage in Nineteen-Seventies: East and West), Dar al-Bayrouni, 2006. He died on 3 February 2006 and was buried in his hometown, Marjayoun. Anniversary remembrance: On the 10th anniversary of Mahfouz’s death, American University of Beirut, Lebanese American University, and the City Theater honored Mahfouz in a joint event. During 2016 al-Zinzalakht, Limāthā, and Al-Diktātūr were produced in Beirut and other cities in Lebanon.

== Quotes on Mahfouz ==
- “One who produced the glory of Arabic theatre,” Pierre Abi-Saab, The Seventh Day (Paris), 11/7/1988.
- “Issam Mahfouz, the first modern writer through his play al-Zinzalakht gave birth to a new era of contemporary Lebanese theater.” Shakib Khoury, Masraḥ al-‘Abath al-Arabī, Paris, 1970.
- “Of the most dedicated writers to human rights issues, he called for justice and patience, and believed that change can be achieved.” Abdo Wazen, al-Ḥayat, 6/2/2004.
- “The fundamental inventiveness in the playwriting of Issam Mahfouz gave new blood not only for Lebanese theater but for the whole world.” Buallam Ramadan, al-Sha’ab, Algiers, 2/12/88.
- “If we talk about Lebanese theater, in the first rank comes the work of Issam Mahfouz who strongly proved his distinctiveness as a pioneering playwright." Mireze Akar, Le Monde, 22/12/1972.
- “Issam Mahfouz wrote a specific movement with respect to language which made him one of the pioneers of modern playwrights of the modern Arab world.” Maurice Maalouf, Al-Diyār, Lebanon, May 1990.
- “The first poems of Mahfouz are justly considered among the genuine heralds that participated in creating the avant-garde movement.” Antoine Gattas Karam, as quoted in al-Mawt al-Awwal, 1973

== List of works ==
=== Dramatic texts ===
- al-Zinzalakht (The China Tree), Dar al-Nahar, 1968. Translated into English with introduction by Salma Khadra Jayyusi and Roger Allen and published in "Modern Arabic Drama: An Anthology", Bloomington, Indiana University Press, 1995.
- al-Qatl (The Killing), Manshurat Majallat Fikr, 1968.
- Carte Blanche, Manshurat Majallat Al-Masaref, 1970. In 1974 the play was translated into German along with nine other plays in Arabische Dramen, the first book in the West of its kind to introduce plays from seven Arab countries where theater was flourishing at the time. The ten plays were selected and translated by Ursula Bedschihl and Adel Kurra Scholli
- al-Diktātūr (The Dictator), Dar Al-Tali’a, 1972. Translated into English with introduction by Robert Myers and Nada Saab and published in "Modern and Contemporary Political Theater from the Levant", London, Brill, 2018; translated into Flemish by Lore Baeten and published as "De Dictator", Brussels, Bebuquin/Moussem, 2017.
- Limāthā Rafadha Sirhan Sirhan Ma Qalahu al-Za’im ‘an Farajalla al-Helou Fī Stereo 71 (Why did Sirhan Sirhan Refuse What The Leader (Antoine Sa’adi) said about Farajalla al-Helou in Cabaret 71?).
- Radio Dramas, Dar al-Quds, 1975.
- ‘Iḥda ‘Ashar Qadhiya Dhud al-Hurrīyah (Eleven Cases against Freedom), Dar al-Quds, 1975.
- Gibran: Ṣura Shakhsia, Masraḥiyah Wathāqīyah (Gibran: A Personal Portrait, a documentary play), al-Moassasa al-Arabiyya, 1983.
- al-Masraḥiyāt al-Qasīrah (The Short Plays), Dar Ab’aad, 1984.
- al-A’māl al-Masraḥiya al-Kāmila (The Complete Dramatic Works), Dar al-Fikr al-Jadid, 1988.
- al-Ta’arīh (Nakedness), Dar al-Farabi, 2003. *al-A’māl al-Masraḥīyah al-Kāmilah, Tab’a Munaqaḥ wa-Mazīd (The Complete Dramatic Works with Additions and Revisions), Dar al-Farabi, 2006.

=== Theater criticism ===
- Scenario al-Masraḥ al-Arabī Fī Mi’at ‘Am (Scenes of the Arab Theater in 100 Years), Beirut, Dar al-Bahith, 1981.
- al-Masraḥ Mustaqbal al-Arabīyah (Theater is the Future of Arabic), Dar al-Farabi,1991. *Masraḥi Wa-al-Masraḥ (A Playwright and The Theater), Beirut, Maktabat Bissan, 1995.
- Masraḥ al-Qarn al-‘Ishrīn: al-Mu’allifūn (The Theater of the 20th Century, Part 1: The Authors), Dar al-Farabi, 2002. T5) Masraḥ al-Qarn al-‘Ishreen: al-ʿArūḍ (The Theater of the 20th Century, Part 2: The Performances) Beirut, Dar al-Farabi, 2002.
- Scenario al-Masrah al-Arabi Fi Mi'at 'Am Yalih al-Maharajanat al-Masrahiyya al-Arabiyya, Beirut, Dar Nelson, 2018.

=== Poetry ===
- Ashya’ Mayta (Dead Things), 1959.
- A’shāb al-Ṣayf (Summer Weeds), Dar Majallat Shi’r, 1961.
- al-Sayf wa-Borj al-Adhra (The Sword and the Sign of Virgo), Dar Majallat Shi’r, 1963.
- al-Mawt al-Awwal (The First Death), Beirut, Mu’assasat Badran, 1973.
- al-A’māl al-Shi’rīyah (Poetic Works), Beirut, Dar al-Farabi, 2019.

=== Criticism ===
- Daftar al-Thaqāfah al-Arabīyah al-Hadīthah (Notebook of Modern Arabic Literature), Dar al-Kitab Al-Lubnani, 1973.
- ‘Arāgūn: al-Sha’ir wa-al-Qadīyah (Aragon: The Poet and the [Palestinian] Cause), al-Mu’assasa al-Arabiyya, 1974.
- al-Riwāyah al-Arabīyah al-Tali’iyah (The Emerging Arab Novel), Dar Ibn Khaldoun, 1981.
- Mashāhid Naqid Arabī Fī Barīs (Views of an Arab Critic in Paris), Dar al-Bahith, 1981.
- Liqā’āt Shakhsīyah ma’ al-Thaqāfah al-Gharbīyah (Personal Encounters with Western Culture), al-Dar Al-Alamiyya, 1984. *al-Suryalīyah Wa-Tafā’ulātiha al-Arabīyah (Surrealism and Its Interactions with Arabic), al-Mu’assasa al-Arabiyya, 1987.
- al-Riwāyah al-Arabīyah al-Shāhidah (The Arab Novel as Witness), Dar al-Mada, 2000. *Muhākamāt Lahā Tārīkh (Important Trials in History), Dar al-Bayrouni, 2005.
- Riḥlah Thaqāfīyah Fī Sab’īnāt al-Qarn al-Māḍī: al-Sharq wa-al-Gharb (A Cultural Voyage in Nineteen-Seventies: East and West), Dar al-Bayrouni, 2006.
- Baris al-Saba'inat, Liqa' al-Masriq wa al-Maghrib" (Paris of the Seventies, Meeting of East and West), Beirut, Dar Nelson, 2018.

=== Politics ===
- Ab’ad Min al-Ḥarb (Beyond War), Dar al-Adab, 1993.
- Ab’ad Min al-Salām (Beyond Peace), Dar al-Farabi, 1997.
- al-Irhāb Bayna al-Salām wa-al-Islām (Terrorism Between Peace and Islam), Dar al-Farabi, 2002.
- Sijālāt al-Qarn al-Ishrīn (Controversies of the 20th Century), Dar al-Farabi, 2004.
- al-Kitaba Fi Zaman al-Harb (Writing in Wartime) Beirut, Dar Nelson, 2018.

=== Dialogue Texts (Hiwār) ===
- Liqā’āt Shakhsīyah Ma’ al-Thaqāfah al-Gharbīyah (Personal Encounters with Western Culture), al-Dar al-Alamiyya, 1984.
- Hiwār Ma’ Ruwād al-Nahḍa al-‘Arabīyah Fī al-Qarn al-Tasi’ ‘ashar (Dialogue with the Leaders of the Arab Renaissance of the 19th Century), Dar al-Rayes, 1988.
- George Shehadeh: Malik al-Shi’ir Wa-al-Masraḥ (George Shahada: The King of Poetry and Drama), Dar al-Nahar, 1989.
- ‘Ishrūn Riwāyah ‘Alamīyah Wa-Tajaribūhum (Twenty International Novelists and Their Experiments), Sharikat al-Matbou’at, 1998.
- Shu’ara’ al-Qarn al-‘Ishrīn (Poets of the 20th Century), Dar al-Ilim Lil Malayeen, 2000.
- al-Shu’ara’ al Ruwād F̄i Lubnān: 1900-1950 (The Pioneering Poets of Lebanon, 1900-1950), Sharikat al-Matbouat, 2000.
- Māthā Yabqa Minhum Lil Tārīkh? (What Will History Remember?), Dar al-Rayes, 2000.
- Rambo Bi-al-Aḥmar (Rambo in Red), Dar al-Farabi, 2002.
- Ma’ al-Shaykh al-Akbar Ibn ‘Arabī (With The Great Sheikh Ibn Arabi), Dar al-Farabi, 2003.
- Hiwār Ma’ al-Mutamarridīn Fī al-Turāth (Dialogue with Nonconformists in Our Heritage), Dar al-Farabi, 2004.
- Hiwār Ma’ al-Mulḥidīn Fī al-Turāth (Dialogue with the Atheists of Our Heritage), Dar Al-Farabi, 2004.
- Riwā’iyy al-Qarn al-‘Ishrīn (The Novelist of the 20th Century), Dar al-Bayrouni, 2005.
- Asāti’dh’ātūna Fī al-Qarn al-‘Ishrīn (Our Teachers in the 20th Century), Dar al-Bayrouni, 2006.

=== Translations (Interpretations with Introductions) ===
- La’nat Zuḥal (The Curse of Saturn), G.B. Bristley, Beirut, Dar al-Farabi, 1998.
- Qasā’id Ḥub (Love Poems), Paul Eluard, Beirut, Dar al-Farabi, 2003.
- Markhs Fī ‘Amerīka (Marx in America), Howard Zinn, Beirut, Dar al-Farabi, 2004.
- Zahrat al-Mistahiyyah, Riwaiya (L'Amante Anglaise), Marguerite Duras, Beirut, Dar Nelson, 2018
- Bi-Intithar Godot (En Attendant Godot) Samuel Beckett, Beirut Dar Nelson, 2018

=== Short stories ===
- ‘Ashiqāt Beirut al-Sitīnāt (Lovers in Beirut in the Nineteen Sixties), Dar Al-Rayes, 2005.

=== Unpublished works ===
- Gibrān Khalīl Gibrān Masraḥiyāt Idh’ā’iyah (Gibran Khalil Gibran Radio Plays), Radio Lebanon 1964.
- Masraḥiyāt Īmā’iyah, (Pantomimes) 1964.
- The script of Kafr Kasem, feature film directed by Borhane Alaouie, 1973.
- al-Masraḥ al-Lubnāni Fī ‘Arūd Masraḥi Wathā’iqī Lil-Talfisīūn al-Lubnānī (The Lebanese Theater in Selected Documentary Plays for Television), 1974.
- al-Maharjānāt al-Masraḥiyah al-‘Arabīyah (Dramatic Festivals in the Arab world)
- Paris al-Sab’īniyāt: Liq’ā al-Mashriq wa-al-Maghrib (Paris in the Seventies: Meeting of East and West)
