= Al-Qussair =

Al-Qussair القصير
- Municipality
- Location within Lebanon
- Coordinates: 33°17′34″N 35°27′18″E
- Grid position: 123/151 L
- Country: Lebanon
- Governorate: Nabatieh Governorate
- District: Marjayoun District
- Time zone: UTC+2 (EET)
  - Summer (DST): UTC+3 (EEST)
- Dialing code: +961

Al-Qussair, El Kuseir, (Arabic: القصير, romanized: al-Quṣayr) is a municipality in the Marjayoun District in South Lebanon.

== Etymology ==
According to E. H. Palmer, the name Kuseir means "the little palace."

== History ==
In 1881, the PEF's Survey of Western Palestine (SWP) described it: "A village, built of stone, containing about 300 Metawileh, situated on ridge of hill, surrounded by gardens of figs and olives, and by arable land. Water is obtained from rock-cut cisterns, and running water in the Wady el Hajeir." They further noted: "There are three caves and a lintel now in use in the village, with a Greek inscription. There are remains of vaults, and the modern houses are built of ancient materials; several rock-cut cisterns."

== Demographics ==
In 2014 Muslims made up 100% of registered voters in Al-Qussair. 98.91% of the voters were Shiite Muslims.

== Bibliography ==
- Conder, C.R.; Kitchener, H.H. (1881). The Survey of Western Palestine: Memoirs of the Topography, Orography, Hydrography, and Archaeology. Vol. 1. London: Committee of the Palestine Exploration Fund.
- Guérin, V. (1880). Description Géographique Historique et Archéologique de la Palestine (in French). Vol. 3: Galilee, pt. 2. Paris: L'Imprimerie Nationale.
- Palmer, E.H. (1881). The Survey of Western Palestine: Arabic and English Name Lists Collected During the Survey by Lieutenants Conder and Kitchener, R. E. Transliterated and Explained by E.H. Palmer. Committee of the Palestine Exploration Fund.
