= Alman, Lebanon =

Alman علمان
- Municipality
- Location within Lebanon
- Coordinates: 33°18′09″N 35°28′16″E
- Grid position: 124/152 L
- Country: Lebanon
- Governorate: Nabatieh Governorate
- District: Marjayoun District
- Time zone: UTC+2 (EET)
  - Summer (DST): UTC+3 (EEST)
- Dialing code: +961

Alman (Arabic: علمان, romanized: ʿAlmān) is a municipality in the Marjayoun District in South Lebanon.

== Etymology ==
According to E. H. Palmer, the name Alman is perhaps from the Arabic form of “a sign-post” or “a mountain”.

== History ==
In 1875 Victor Guérin visited, and noted that some houses were built with large stones which appeared ancient.

In 1881, the PEF's Survey of Western Palestine (SWP) described it: "A few houses built of stone on the ruins of a village; they contain about forty Metawileh. The place is situated on the edge of the cliffs above the Litany River, and is surrounded by a few gardens with figs and olives; there are five rock-cut cisterns and a birket." They further noted: "The present village is built on the ruins of a former town, of which the foundations can be seen. The houses are built with great blocks of ancient appearance. On the north side there is a rock-cut tomb, with roughly-sculptured figures over the entrance: this is called Mugharet ish Shahl."

== Demographics ==
In 2014 Muslims made up 88.00% and Christians made up 12.00% of registered voters in Alman. 88.00% of the voters were Shiite Muslims.

== Bibliography ==
- Conder, C.R.; Kitchener, H.H. (1881). The Survey of Western Palestine: Memoirs of the Topography, Orography, Hydrography, and Archaeology. Vol. 1. London: Committee of the Palestine Exploration Fund.
- Guérin, V. (1880). Description Géographique Historique et Archéologique de la Palestine (in French). Vol. 3: Galilee, pt. 2. Paris: L'Imprimerie Nationale.
- Palmer, E.H. (1881). The Survey of Western Palestine: Arabic and English Name Lists Collected During the Survey by Lieutenants Conder and Kitchener, R. E. Transliterated and Explained by E.H. Palmer. Committee of the Palestine Exploration Fund.
