= Qabrikha =

Qabrikha قبريخا
- Municipality
- Location within Lebanon
- Coordinates: 33°15′7″N 35°27′55″E
- Grid position: 193/295 PAL
- Country: Lebanon
- Governorate: Nabatieh Governorate
- District: Marjayoun District
- Elevation: 500 m (1,600 ft)
- Time zone: UTC+2 (EET)
  - Summer (DST): UTC+3 (EEST)
- Dialing code: +961

Qabrikha (Arabic: قبريخا, romanized: Qabrīkhā), also spelled Abrika or Kabrika, is a municipality in the Marjayoun District, in southern Lebanon.

== Etymology ==
According to E. H. Palmer, the name Abrika comes from a personal name.

== History ==
In 1852 Edward Robinson noted: "On approaching the village, we came upon the ruins of dwellings, some of them of hewn stones; and I afterwards found among them a curved stone of an arch with a projecting shoulder, such as is seen in the remains of the theatre at Smyrna. The ruins we had come to examine are in the village itself. They consist of two rows of columns of an ancient temple, extending from east to west. The columns are of a whitish limestone. Of the northern row there are four standing in place, two prostrate, and fragments of two others. Of the southern row, three are standing and two are lying. One of the upright columns has an Ionic capital with delicate tracery work below the volutes. Its height in all is about twelve feet. Many large hewn stones are built into the walls of hovels around and among the columns; but there are none that seem to be in place. That here was an ancient heathen temple there can be little doubt, but whether it was of Phoenician, Greek, or Roman origin, there exists no historic trace whatever to afford light or reward inquiry."

In 1875, Victor Guérin found the village to have 150 Metuali inhabitants.

In 1881, the PEF's Survey of Western Palestine (SWP) described it: "A village, built of stone, containing about 150 Metawileh, situated on a hill-top. It was evidently an early Christian village [..]. The country round is cultivated with figs, olives, and arable land; there is a rock-cut birkeh and several cisterns in the village. Traces of an ancient paved road are to be found to the north in the valley, that may have formerly led up to the village."

They further noted: "There are here the remains of an early Christian church. Two of the columns still stand in situ in the village, and one bears its capital of Corinthian design, resembling-those at Yarun. Several pedestals are also in situ, with the doubtful traces of an apse. Under this there is a rock-cut tomb, with the entrance outside the east end of the church, and the local under where the altar would probably be placed. The loculi are ordinary square-headed kokim; the tomb was too much filled with chopped straw to see how many there were. A large stone, used as a lintel in one of the houses, bears the representation of a vase; and there is also a stone niche built into the wall of a modern house. There are several well-dressed stones of considerable size, and some rock-cutting showing foundations of ancient buildings."

On 23 June 1999 a woman in Qabrika was wounded by Israeli shellfire. Hezbullah responded by firing rockets into northern Israel, claiming that there had been 21 attacks on eleven Lebanese villages in southern Lebanon over the previous five days. Israel responded with two devastating air raids on 24-25 June. Two power stations and a telephone company where destroyed as well as the Al-Manar radio station in Baalbeck and five bridges between Beirut and Sidon. A second Hizbullah salvo of Katusha rockets killed two people in Kiryat Shimona. It was estimated that the Israeli air strikes caused $52 million direct damage. Eight Lebanese were killed including three firemen, and seventy people were seriously wounded.

== Demographics ==
In 2014 Muslims made up 99.43% of registered voters in Qabrikha. 98.42% of the voters were Shiite Muslims.

== Bibliography ==
- Conder, C.R.; Kitchener, H.H. (1881). The Survey of Western Palestine: Memoirs of the Topography, Orography, Hydrography, and Archaeology. Vol. 1. London: Committee of the Palestine Exploration Fund.
- Guérin, V. (1880). Description Géographique Historique et Archéologique de la Palestine (in French). Vol. 3: Galilee, pt. 2. Paris: L'Imprimerie Nationale.
- Palmer, E.H. (1881). The Survey of Western Palestine: Arabic and English Name Lists Collected During the Survey by Lieutenants Conder and Kitchener, R. E. Transliterated and Explained by E.H. Palmer. Committee of the Palestine Exploration Fund.
- Robinson, E.; Smith, E. (1856). Later Biblical Researches in Palestine and adjacent regions: A Journal of Travels in the year 1852. London: John Murray.
