= Marjayoun =

Marjayoun مرجعيون
- Municipality
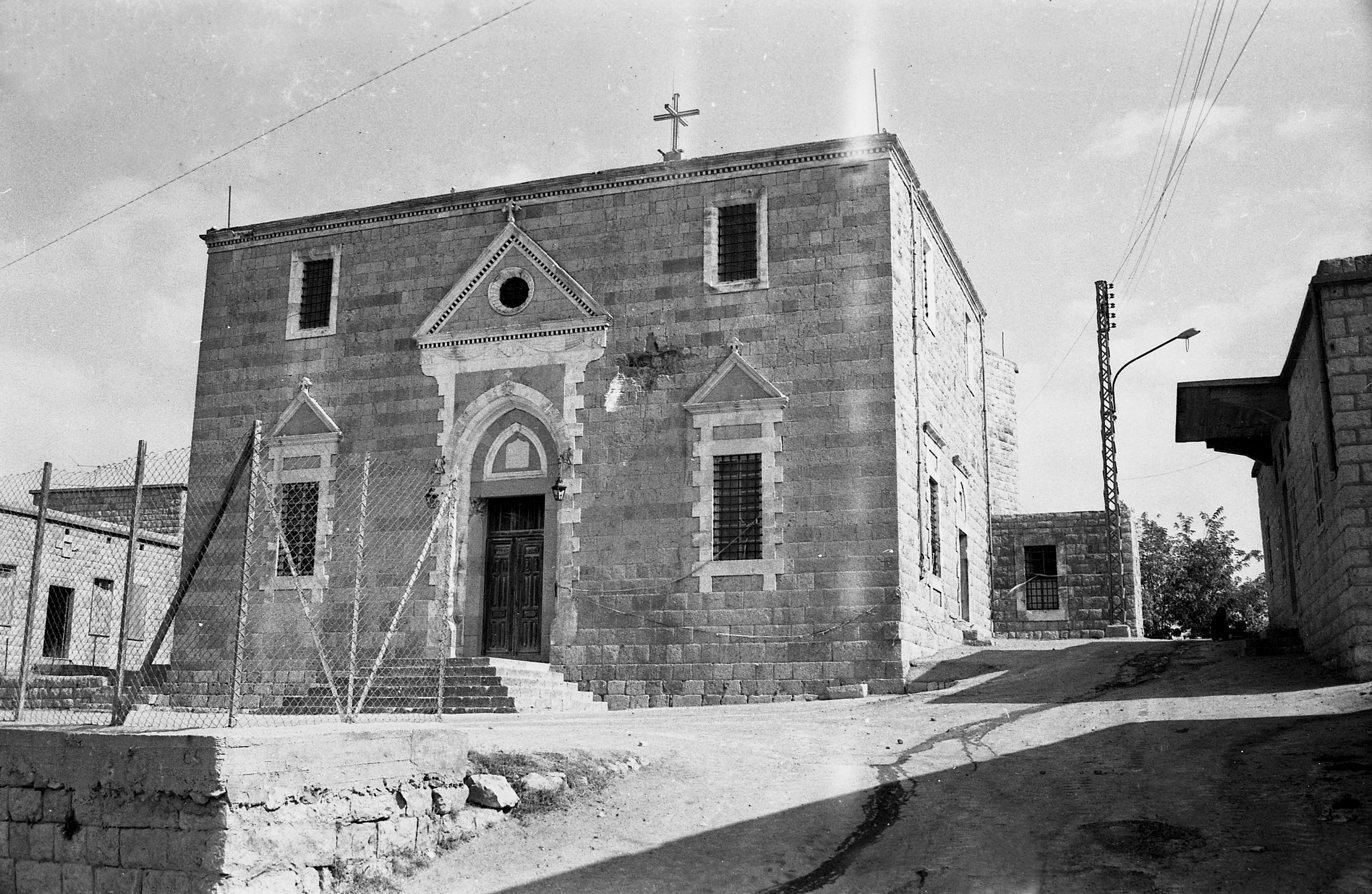
- Church in Marjayoun, 1977

- Location in Lebanon
- Coordinates: 33°21′43″N 35°35′23″E
- Grid position: 135/158 L
- Country: Lebanon
- Governorate: Nabatieh Governorate
- District: Marjayoun
- Elevation: 860 m (2,820 ft)

Population (2022)
  - Total: 7,000−10,000
  - Religions: Greek Orthodoxy; Melkite Greek Catholic Archeparchy of Baniyas; Maronite Catholicism; Greek Catholicism; Latin Catholicism; Shia Islam; Sunni Islam; Druze
- Time zone: UTC+2 (EET)
  - Summer (DST): UTC+3 (EEST)

Marjayoun or Jdeidet Marjayoun (Arabic: مرجعيون, romanized: Marjʿayūn: Lebanese pronunciation [ˈmaɾʒ.ʕajuːn]), also Marj 'Ayoun, Marjuyun or Marjeyoun (lit. "meadow of springs") and Jdeideh / Jdeida / Jdeidet Marjeyoun, is a municipality in the Marjeyoun District, Nabatieh Governorate in Southern Lebanon.

== History ==
=== Crusader period ===
On 10 June 1179, during the Battle of Marj Ayyun, the Ayyubids defeated the Crusaders. The Crusader king narrowly escaped capture.

=== Ottoman period ===
In 1596, Jadida appears in the daftar of Ottoman nahiya (subdistrict) of Tibnin in the liwa' (district) of Safad, as a Muslim village of 28 households and 12 bachelors. The villagers paid a fixed tax-rate of 25% on agricultural products, such as wheat, barley, olive trees, vineyards, goats and beehives, in addition to "occasional revenues" and a press for olive oil or grape syrup; a total of 9,606 akçe.

In 1875 Victor Guérin visited Marjayoun (which he called Djedeideh), and found 2,000 inhabitants, mostly "Schismatic Greek" (i.e. Melkite Uniats), but also some Greek Orthodox and Muslims.

Saint Peter's Cathedral, built in 1892, was restored in 1968 after a fire. It was also later restored in 2009.

=== 20th–21st centuries ===
During the Syria-Lebanon Campaign of World War II, British and Australian forces advancing from Palestine entered the town on 11 June 1941, but were forced to withdraw on 15 June following a Vichy French counterattack. The Allies recaptured the town on 24 June in the Battle of Merdjayoun.

Marjayoun was the headquarters of the South Lebanon Army, the militia that controlled southern Lebanon during Israel's occupation of the region after the 1982 Lebanon War until its withdrawal from the region in 2000. Following the pullout, many residents of Marjayoun fled to Israel, fearing accusations of collaboration.

On 10 August 2006, after the breakdown of ceasefire negotiations in the 2006 Lebanon War, Israeli forces took control of Marjayoun. The next day, a convoy of 3,000 people fled from the town. The convoy was attacked by the Israeli Air Force (IAF) northeast of Hasbaya en route to Kefraya, in the south of the Bekaa valley. The bombing killed at least seven people, and is known as the Marjayoun convoy incident.

On 29 May 2026, rockets fired by Hezbollah struck Saint George's Orthodox Church in the village.

== Geography ==
Marjayoun is 860 metres (2,822 ft) above sea level, standing on the west side of the Jordan Rift Valley just across from the ancient regional capital, Caesarea Philippi, which was located at the foot of Mount Hermon on the east side of the Rift Valley.

Marjeyoun stands on a hill facing Mt Hermon to the east, the Crusader castle of Beaufort, set above the Litani River and overlooking Mount Amel (Jabal Amel), to the west, the Mount Lebanon range with the Rihan and Niha peaks to the north, with the fertile Marjeyoun plains extending southward into the Galilee plains and the Golan Heights.

== Demographics ==
In 2014 Christians made up 74.36% and Muslims made up 25.36% of registered voters in Marjayoun. 39.05% of the voters were Greek Orthodox, 18.98% were Greek Catholics and 19.69% were Sunni Muslims.

1. Greek Orthodox (38.6%)
2. Sunni Muslim (20.2%)
3. Greek Catholic (18.7%)
4. Maronite Catholic (10.4%)
5. Shiite Muslim (6.00%)
6. Other Christian Minorities (6.10%)
Religion in Marjayoun according to 2022 elections data

The town of Marjayoun has a Christian majority population of about 5,000 people. Greek Orthodox Christians compose the vast majority of the town's population, however, there are also Maronite and Greek Catholic Christians living in Marjayoun. Outside the town, most villages in the surrounding valleys and mountains are predominantly Shia Muslim.

The Melkite Saint Peter's Cathedral was built in 1892 and restored in 1968 after a fire and in 2009. Marjayoun is the seat of the Melkite (Greek Catholic) Archeparchy of Baniyas, which includes the southeastern part of Lebanon.

=== Parliamentary representation ===
The district of Marjayoun, which includes the town, is largely Shia Muslim. It holds three seats in the Lebanese government, two belonging to Shia Muslims and one belonging to Greek Orthodox Christians.

== Hospital ==
Marjayoun is home to a regional government hospital founded in 1960, and a Lebanese Red Cross First Aid Center. This government hospital was closed due to Israeli attacks to Lebanon in October 2024 and killed and injured number of hospital staff.

== Marjayoun Airfield ==
An abandoned airfield is located 10 kilometres (6.2 mi) south of Metula. Ruins of buildings and outline of the runways and taxiway are all that remains. In a strategic triangle linking Lebanon with Israel and Syria are located the ruins of "Marjayoun Airport" or what is known as "Al-Marj Airport" or "English Airport". The green color of the Marjayoun Plain is only disturbed by forgotten walls from the days of World War II, their hard stones separating the fertile agricultural lands of the Marjayoun Plain. During the Second World War, the region of the Marjayoun Plain formed an arena of confrontation between the allies on one side and the German army on the other, so the allies had to fortify themselves, specifically in the Marjayoun Plain, which was a defensive area or a back line of confrontations if Egypt fell into the hands of the German army, or if the German Army managed to advance into Palestine, Lebanon and Syria.

== Notable people ==
- Brigitte Gabriel (born1964) – Lebanese-American journalist, author and lecturer
- Walid Gholmieh – director of the Conservatoire Libanais national supérieur de musique; born in Marjeyoun
- Hicham Haddad – comedian, actor, and TV host
- Major Saad Haddad (1936–1984) – founder and head of the South Lebanon Army (SLA) during the Lebanese Civil War
- George Jordac (1931–2014) – author and poet
- Antoine Lahad (1927–2015) – Lebanese Army Major General, and subsequently leader of the South Lebanon Army
- Issam Mahfouz (1939–2006) – writer and journalist
- Anthony Shadid – Pulitzer Prize–winning journalist
- Michael Shadid – physician, born in Marjeyoun

== Climate ==
Climate data for Marjayoun, elevation 773 m (2,536 ft)
Month	Jan	Feb	Mar	Apr	May	Jun	Jul	Aug	Sep	Oct	Nov	Dec	Year
Mean daily maximum °C (°F)	11.1 (52.0)	11.8 (53.2)	14.3 (57.7)	18.3 (64.9)	22.6 (72.7)	25.5 (77.9)	26.7 (80.1)	27.7 (81.9)	26.0 (78.8)	23.8 (74.8)	18.7 (65.7)	13.3 (55.9)	20.0 (68.0)
Daily mean °C (°F)	8.3 (46.9)	8.6 (47.5)	10.8 (51.4)	14.3 (57.7)	18.3 (64.9)	20.8 (69.4)	22.2 (72.0)	23.0 (73.4)	21.5 (70.7)	19.6 (67.3)	15.1 (59.2)	10.1 (50.2)	16.1 (60.9)
Mean daily minimum °C (°F)	5.9 (42.6)	6.0 (42.8)	7.9 (46.2)	10.6 (51.1)	14.1 (57.4)	16.6 (61.9)	18.2 (64.8)	19.1 (66.4)	17.7 (63.9)	16.1 (61.0)	12.3 (54.1)	7.9 (46.2)	12.7 (54.9)
Average precipitation mm (inches)	193 (7.6)	181 (7.1)	129 (5.1)	73 (2.9)	26 (1.0)	1 (0.0)	1 (0.0)	1 (0.0)	3 (0.1)	24 (0.9)	91 (3.6)	162 (6.4)	885 (34.7)
Source: FAO

== See also ==
- Antiochian Greek Christians
- Arab Christians
- Christianity in Lebanon
- Greek genocide
- Greek Orthodox (Roum Orthodox) Christians in Lebanon
- History of Arab Christians
- History of Eastern Christianity
- History of the Eastern Orthodox Church under the Ottoman Empire
- Lebanese Americans
- Persecution of Eastern Orthodox Christians

== Bibliography ==
- Guérin, V. (1880). Description Géographique Historique et Archéologique de la Palestine (in French). Vol. 3: Galilee, pt. 2. Paris: L'Imprimerie Nationale.
- HRW (2007). Why They Died: Civilian Casualties in Lebanon During the 2006 War. Human Rights Watch.
- Hütteroth, W.-D.; Abdulfattah, K. (1977). Historical Geography of Palestine, Transjordan and Southern Syria in the Late 16th Century. Erlanger Geographische Arbeiten, Sonderband 5. Erlangen, Germany: Vorstand der Fränkischen Geographischen Gesellschaft. ISBN 3-920405-41-2.
- Rhode, H. (1979). Administration and Population of the Sancak of Safed in the Sixteenth Century (PhD). Columbia University. Archived from the original on 2020-03-01.
- Riley – Smith, J. (1973). The Feudal Nobility and the Kingdom of Jerusalem 1174 – 1277. London: The Macmillan Press Ltd. ISBN 0-208-01348-2.
