= Marjayoun District =

- District
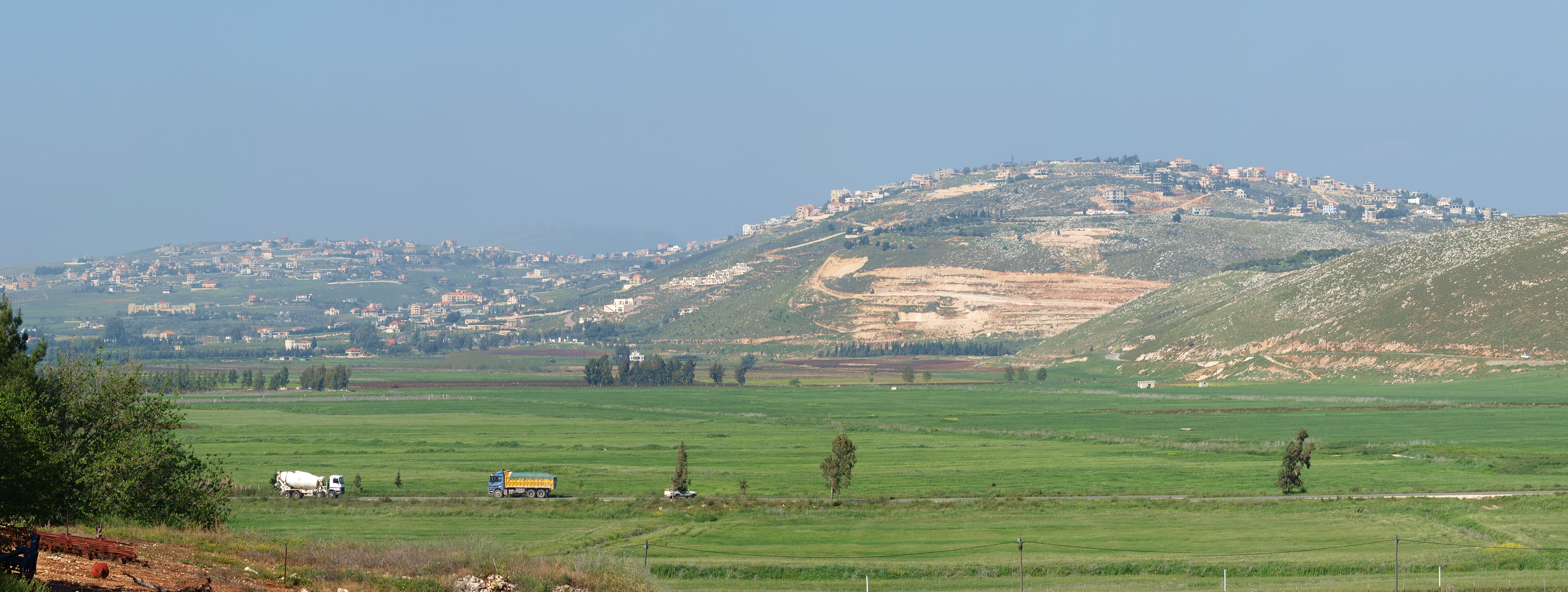
- Al-Khiyam, Marjayoun District

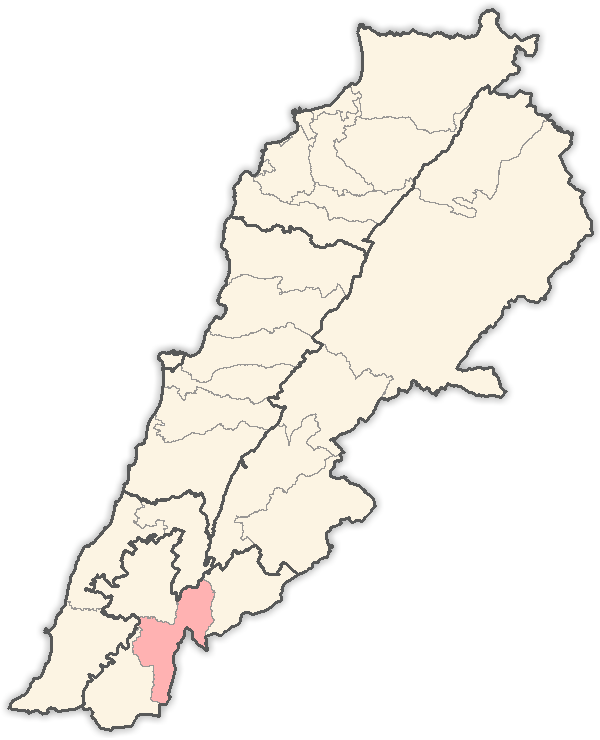
- Location in Lebanon
- Coordinates: 33°21′43″N 35°35′23″E
- Country: Lebanon
- Governorate: Nabatiyeh Governorate
- Capital: Marjayoun

Area
  - Total: 102.4 sq mi (265.3 km^{2})
- Elevation: 2,820 ft (860 m)

Population
  - Estimate (31 December 2017): 85,960
- Time zone: UTC+2 (EET)
  - Summer (DST): UTC+3 (EEST)

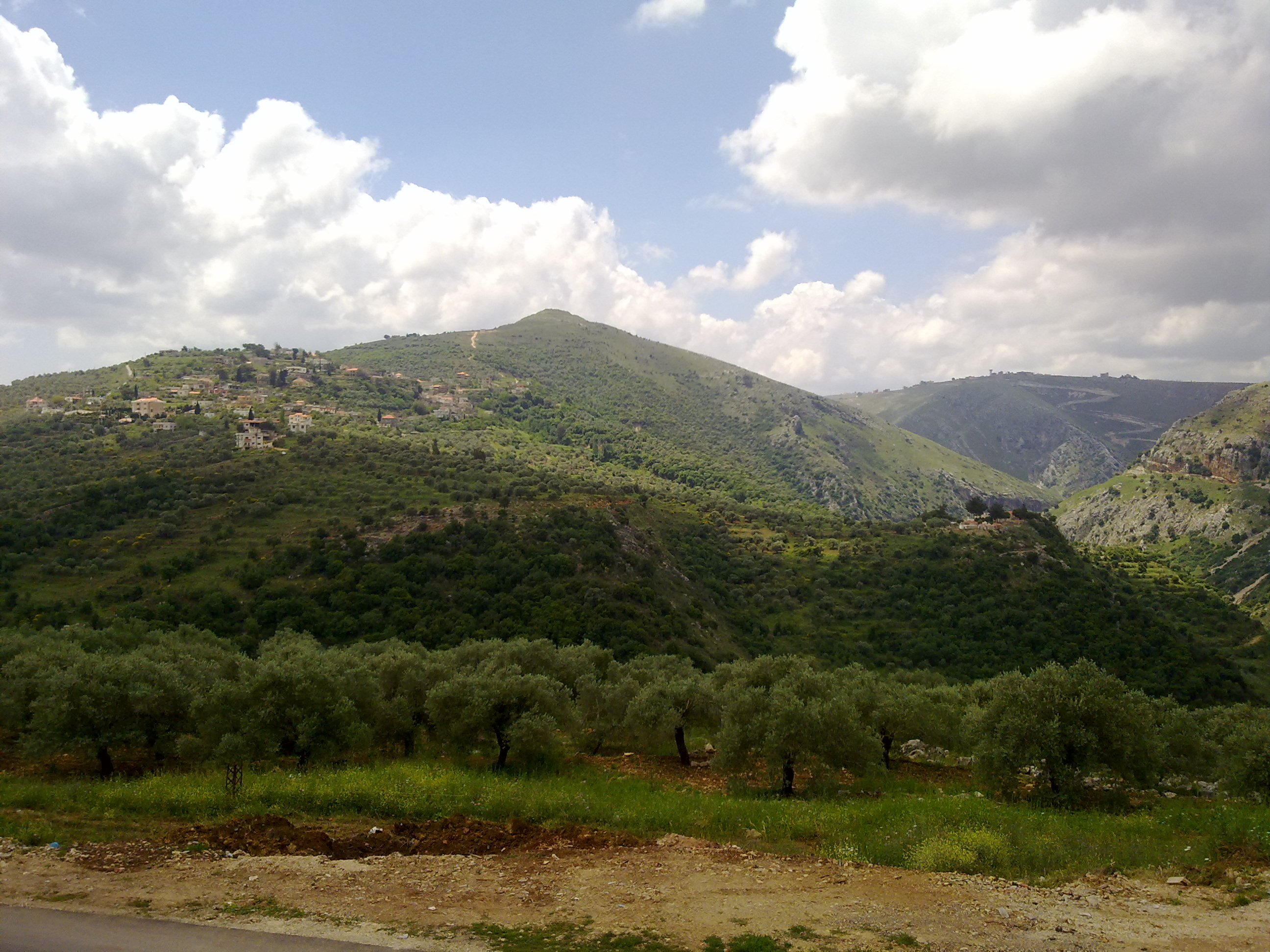
Al-Qlaiaah, Marjayoun District

The Marjayoun District is a district in the Nabatieh Governorate of Lebanon. The capital of the district is Marjayoun.

Marjayoun stands at a hill facing Mount Hermon to the East, with Beaufort Castle. The Litani River and Mount Amel are to the West, The Rihan, Niha and the Lebanon Mountain Range to the North and the fertile plains of Sahil Marjayoun that extends into Northern Israel between the Galilee finger and plains immediately underneath the Golan Heights.

== Municipalities ==
The following 32 municipalities are all located in the Marjayoun District:

- Al-Aadaissah
- Aadshit
- Ain Arab
- Al-Buwaydah
- Alman
- Bani Haiyyan
- Blat
- Blida
- Burj al-Mulouk
- Deir Mimas
- Deir Siryan
- Dibbin
- Houla
- Ebel as-Saqi
- Kfar Kila
- Al-Khiyam
- Majdal Selem
- Marjayoun
- Markaba
- Mais al-Jabal
- Muhaibib
- Qabrikha
- Al-Qantara
- Al-Qlaiaah
- Al-Qussair
- Rab Thalathin
- As-Sawanah
- Surda wa Al-Aamra
- Talloussah
- Taybeh
- Toulin
- Al-Wazzani

== Demographics ==
According to registered voters in 2014:

Year	Christians					Muslims				Druze
Year	Total	Greek Orthodox	Maronites	Greek Catholics	Other Christians	Total	Shias	Sunnis	Alawites	Druze
2014	14.89%	5.74%	5.12%	2.70%	1.33%	83.91%	80.16%	3.74%	0.01%	0.91%
2022	14.96%	5.82%	5.18%	2.35%	1.61%	83.96%	80.34%	3.62%	0.00%	1.08%
