= Bani Haiyyan =

Bani Haiyyan بني حيان
- Municipality
- Location within Lebanon
- Coordinates: 33°14′35″N 35°29′15″E
- Grid position: 193/294 PAL
- Country: Lebanon
- Governorate: Nabatieh Governorate
- District: Marjayoun District
- Elevation: 505 m (1,657 ft)
- Time zone: UTC+2 (EET)
  - Summer (DST): UTC+3 (EEST)
- Dialing code: +961

Bani Haiyyan (Arabic: بني حيان, romanized: Banī Ḥaiyyān) is a municipality in the Marjayoun District in southern Lebanon.

== Etymology ==
According to E. H. Palmer, the name comes from the Arab tribe of Beni Haiyan.

== History ==
In 1875 Victor Guérin found here about 100 Metuali inhabitants. He further noted: "All the houses are built of regular stones belonging to ancient buildings, and most of the doors have fine lintels."

In 1881, the PEF's Survey of Western Palestine (SWP) described it as: "A small village, built of stone, containing about fifty Metawileh, situated on the side of a hill and surrounded by figs, olives, and arable land. The water supply is from about ten rock-cut cisterns in the village and a birket near."

== Demographics ==
In 2014 Muslims made up 99.49% of registered voters in Bani Haiyyan. 98.84% of the voters were Shiite Muslims.

== Bibliography ==
- Conder, C.R.; Kitchener, H.H. (1881). The Survey of Western Palestine: Memoirs of the Topography, Orography, Hydrography, and Archaeology. Vol. 1. London: Committee of the Palestine Exploration Fund.
- Guérin, V. (1880). Description Géographique Historique et Archéologique de la Palestine (in French). Vol. 3: Galilee, pt. 2. Paris: L'Imprimerie Nationale.
- Palmer, E.H. (1881). The Survey of Western Palestine: Arabic and English Name Lists Collected During the Survey by Lieutenants Conder and Kitchener, R. E. Transliterated and Explained by E.H. Palmer. Committee of the Palestine Exploration Fund.
