= Aadshit al-Qusayr =

Municipality in Nabatieh Governorate, Lebanon

Aadshit al-Qusayr عدشيت القصير
- Municipality
- Location within Lebanon
- Coordinates: 33°16′38″N 35°28′51″E
- Grid position: 195/198 PAL
- Country: Lebanon
- Governorate: Nabatieh Governorate
- District: Marjayoun District
- Time zone: UTC+2 (EET)
  - Summer (DST): UTC+3 (EEST)
- Dialing code: +961

Aadshit al-Qusayr (Arabic: عدشيت القصير, romanized: ʿAdshīt al-Quṣayr), or simply Aadshit (Arabic: عدشيت), is a municipality in the Marjayoun District in South Lebanon.

== Etymology ==
According to E. H. Palmer, the name Atshis comes from a personal name.

== History ==
In 1875, Victor Guérin found the village to have Metuali inhabitants.

In 1881, the PEF's Survey of Western Palestine (SWP) described it: "a small village, built of mud and stone, containing about 100 Metawileh, situated on a low ridge surrounded by small gardens and olives. The water supply is from four rock-cut cisterns."

== Demographics ==
In 2014 Muslims made up 99.71% of registered voters in Aadshit. 98.84% of the voters were Shiite Muslims.

== Bibliography ==
- Conder, C.R.; Kitchener, H.H. (1881). The Survey of Western Palestine: Memoirs of the Topography, Orography, Hydrography, and Archaeology. Vol. 1. London: Committee of the Palestine Exploration Fund.
- Guérin, V. (1880). Description Géographique Historique et Archéologique de la Palestine (in French). Vol. 3: Galilee, pt. 2. Paris: L'Imprimerie Nationale.
- Palmer, E.H. (1881). The Survey of Western Palestine: Arabic and English Name Lists Collected During the Survey by Lieutenants Conder and Kitchener, R. E. Transliterated and Explained by E.H. Palmer. Committee of the Palestine Exploration Fund.
