= Belad Bechara =

Mountainous region in Jabal Amel, Lebanon

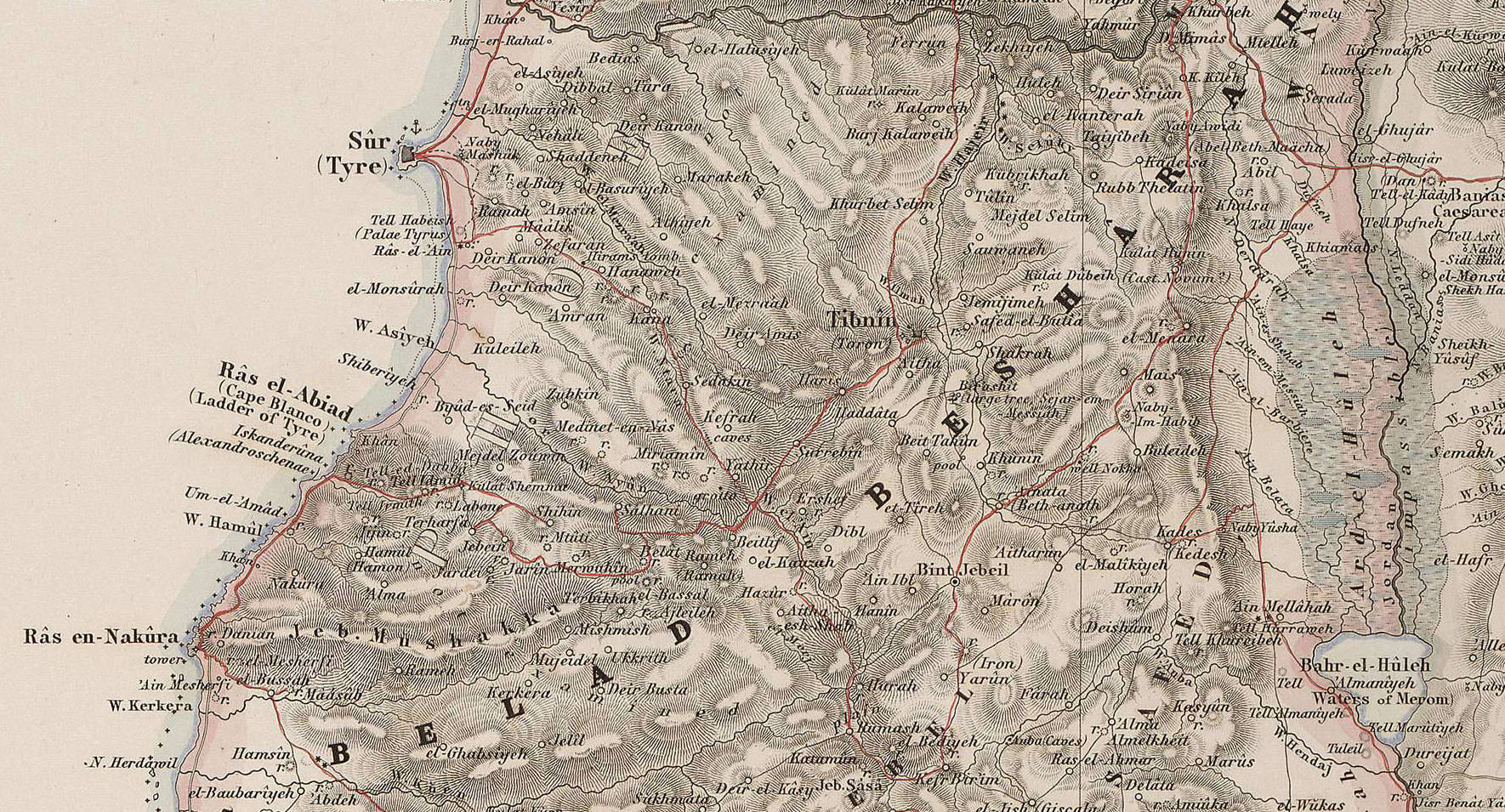
Belad Besharah in the 1858 van de Velde maps

Belad Bechara, also spelled Bilad Beshara (Arabic: بلاد بشارة), is a popular and historic name for a mountainous region in Jabal Amel in Southern Lebanon.

== Etymology ==
Some historians believe that the name Belad Bechara means the "Country of the Gospel" in reference to the teaching and revelation of Christ in the region while others believe it is in reference to an Ayyubid prince by the name of Bechara.

== Geography ==
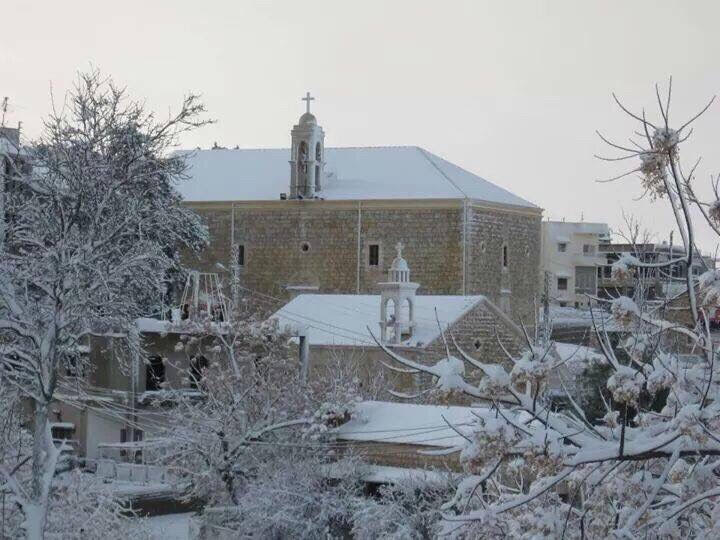
Ain Ebel, a village in Belad Bechara

Belad Bechara is the mountainous region that lies south of the Litani River, extending southward to Upper Galilee, and including the Hula Valley, Hunin, and Tiberias.

== History ==
According to Abrahamic traditions, Belad Bechara is the northernmost part of the Promised Land, which was the division of the tribes of Azer and Naphtali, and later took the name of Upper Galilee.

In 1881, C. R. Conder and H. H. Kitchener mentioned ten villages in the Belad Besharah region on their map 2, namely: 'Aita ez Zut, Berashit, Haris, El Jumeijmeh, Kefrah, Meis, Safed el Battikh, Tibnin, Kulat Tibnin and El Yehudiyeh. On map 3 there was one village; Salhaneh. The remaining 27 villages were on map 4: 'Ain Ibl, 'Ainata, 'Aita esh Shaub, 'Aitherun, Beit Lif, Beit Yahun, Belideh, Bint Umm Jubeil, Deishun, Dibl, Haddatha, Hanin, Kades, El Kozah, Kunin, El Malkiyeh, Marun er Ras, Neby Muheibib, Ramia, Rumeish, Rusheif, Salhah, Es Salihiyeh, Surubbin, Et Tireh, Yater and Yarun.

== See also ==
- Jabal Amel
- Upper Galilee
- Ain Ebel
- El Assaad Family
- El Zein Family

== Bibliography ==
- Conder, C.R.; Kitchener, H.H. (1881). The Survey of Western Palestine: Memoirs of the Topography, Orography, Hydrography, and Archaeology. Vol. 1. London: Committee of the Palestine Exploration Fund.
