= Southern Lebanon =

Geographic region of Lebanon

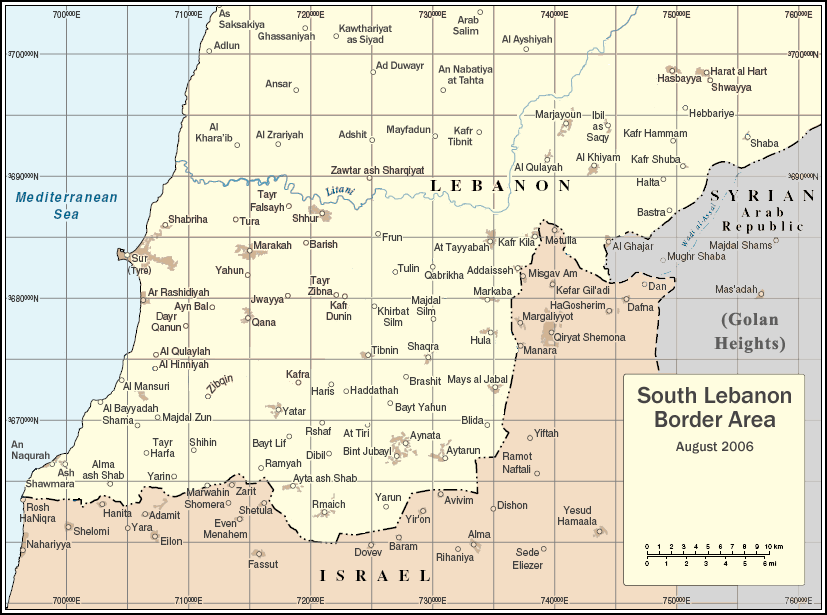
Southern Lebanon

Southern Lebanon (Arabic: جنوب لبنان, romanized: Janūb Lubnān) is the area of Lebanon comprising the South Governorate and the Nabatiye Governorate. The two entities were divided from the same province in the early 1990s. The term may also comprise Rashaya and Western Beqaa districts, the southernmost districts of the Beqaa Governorate.

The main cities of the region are Sidon and Tyre on the coast, with Jezzine and Nabatiyeh more inland. The destroyed caza of Bint Jbeil, and the cazas of Tyre, and Nabatieh in Southern Lebanon are known for their large Shi'a Muslim population with a minority of Christians. Sidon is predominantly Sunni, with the rest of the caza of Sidon having a Shi'a Muslim majority, with a considerable Christian minority, mainly Melkite Greek Catholics. The cazas of Jezzine and Marjeyoun have a Christian majority and also Shia Muslims. The villages of Ain Ebel, Debel, Qaouzah, and Rmaich are entirely Christian Maronite. The caza of Hasbaya has a Druze majority.

== History ==
=== Free Lebanon State and South Lebanon security belt ===
Southern Lebanon became the location of the self-proclaimed Free Lebanon State, announced in 1979 by Saad Haddad. The state failed to gain international recognition, and its authority deteriorated with the death of Saad Haddad in 1984.

Southern Lebanon has also featured prominently in the Israel-Lebanon conflict.

=== Ahmadinejad's state visit ===
In October 2010, Iranian President Mahmoud Ahmadinejad visited South Lebanon. This was his first visit to Lebanon since he first assumed office in Tehran in 2005. Both Israel and the United States condemned the trip as being "provocative." Ahmadinejad was welcomed by tens of thousands of supporters of Hezbollah, Iran's Shiite Muslim ally in Lebanon which has been branded a terrorist organization in part or whole by much of South America, the EU, the Arab League, the United States and Israel. This is despite its participation in Lebanon's fragile government.

=== 2026 Lebanon war ===
In March 2026, during the 2026 Lebanon war, Israeli Finance Minister Bezalel Smotrich stated that Israel, following the war, should annex territories up to the Litani River.

Israeli Defense minister Israel Katz states that the military will control a "security zone" up to the Litani River in southern Lebanon until the threat of Hezbollah is removed.

== Cities and districts ==
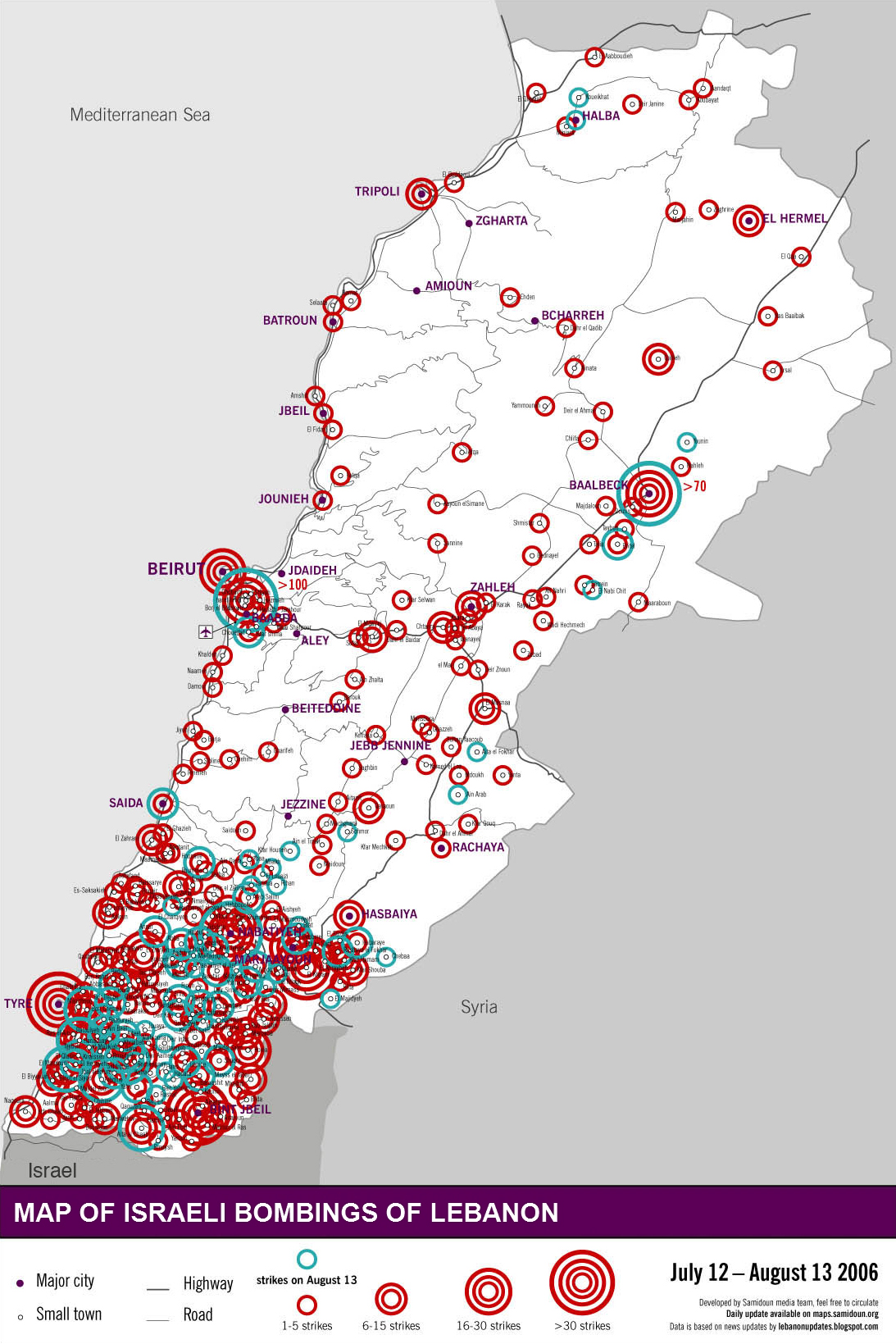
Areas targeted by Israeli bombing (July–August 2006) concentrated on Southern Lebanon.

- Aaramta
- Al Rihan
- Alma ash-Shab (Aalma ach Chaab)
- Abbasieh
- Adlun
- Al Mansuri
- Ain Ebel
- Ain Baal or Ayn Bal
- Aitaroun or Aytarun
- Ansariyeh or Insariye
- Ansar
- Ash Shawmara
- At Tayyabah
- At Tiri
- Aitit
- Aynata
- Ayta ash Shab (Ayta al-Sha'b, Ayta)
- Baraachit
- Barish
- Bayt Lif
- baytulay
- Bazouryeh
- Beit Yahoun
- Bint Jbeil (destroyed)
- Blida, Lebanon
- Borj el Shamali or Borj Chemali
- Borj Qalaouiyeh
- Borj Rahal
- Boustane
- Brashit
- Braikeh
- Chtoura
- Deir Kifa
- Deyrintar
- Dayr Qanunc
- Deir Qanoun En Nahr
- Derdghaya
- Dibil or Debel
- Dibbine
- Doueir
- Ebel el Saki
- El Biyyadah or Al Bayyadah
- El Hennyeh or Al Hinniyah
- El Mansoun or Al Mansuri
- El Qlaile or Al Qulaylah
- El Soultaniyeh
- Fardis
- Frun
- Ghandouriyeh
- Ghaziyeh
- Ghassaniyeh
- Hadata or Haddathah
- Hanaway
- Harouf
- Harris or Harres
- Hula or Houla
- Hounin
- Jabal Amel
- Jarjouh
- Jarmaq
- Jebchet
- Jmaijmah
- Joiya or Jouaya or Jwayya
- Qabrikha or Kabrikha
- Kaakaeit al-Jesser
- Kafra, Lebanon
- Kafr Dunin
- Kafr Kila
- Kawkaba or Kaoukaba
- Kfar Melki
- Kafarrouman
- Khirbet Selm
- Khiam
- Kfarchouba
- Kfarfila
- Kfarhamam
- Kfar Tebnit
- Kounin
- Maachouq
- Mahrouna
- Majdel Balhis
- Majdel Selm or Majdal Zun
- Marakeh
- Marjayoun—a Lebanese Christian village
- Markaba (Marqaba)
- Maroun al-Ras
- Marwahin
- Maaroub
- Mayfadoun
- Meiss el Jabal or Mays al Jabal
- Mlikh
- Miye ou Miye
- Maghdouche
- Nabatiye or Nabatiyeh
- Naqoura (Nakoura, An-Naqurah)
- Niha
- Nmairiyeh
- Odaisseh
- Oum el Ahmad
- Qlayaa
- Qana
- Qantara
- Rab El Thalathine
- Rachaf—a small town
- Rachaya El Foukhar—Hasbaya Qaza
- Ramyah
- Ras Al-Biyada
- Rmaich
- Rmadyeh
- Roûm
- Selaa
- Shabriha
- Shaqra
- Shebaa and Shebaa Farms (ownership disputed, occupied by Israel since 1967)
- Shihin, Lebanon
- Shhur
- Siddiqine
- Sidon or Saida
- Sir el Gharbiyeh
- Srifa
- Sujod
- As-Sultaniyah
- Tallousa
- Tair Debbe
- Tayr Harfa or Tair Harfa
- Tayr Falsayh
- Taibeh
- Tebnine (Tebnine, Tibneen), site of the former castle town Toron
- Tulin, Lebanon (Toulin)
- Tura
- Tyre or Sur
- Saida district
- Jezzine district
- Tyre district
- Wadi al-Taym
- Yarin
- Yaroun or Yarun
- Yahun
- Yater or Yatar
- Zibdine
- Zibqin

== Other notable sites ==
- Abou Assouad River
- Awali River
- El Zahrani River
- Litani River
- Saitaniq River
- Kasmieh River
- Blue Line (Lebanon)
- Beaufort Castle
- Palestinian refugee camps in Lebanon, including Ain al-Hilweh, Nabatieh camp and Wavel
- Ras al-Ain, Lebanon

== See also ==
- Israeli occupation of Southern Lebanon (1982–2000)
- South Lebanon Army
- South Lebanon conflict (1982–2000)
- Northern District (Israel)
- Operation Litani against the Palestine Liberation Organization
- United Nations Interim Force in Lebanon (instituted by United Nations Security Council Resolution 425)
- 2006 Lebanon War
- 2026 Lebanon war
- Israeli occupation of Southern Lebanon (2026)
