= Deir Intar =

Deir Intar دير انطار
- Municipality
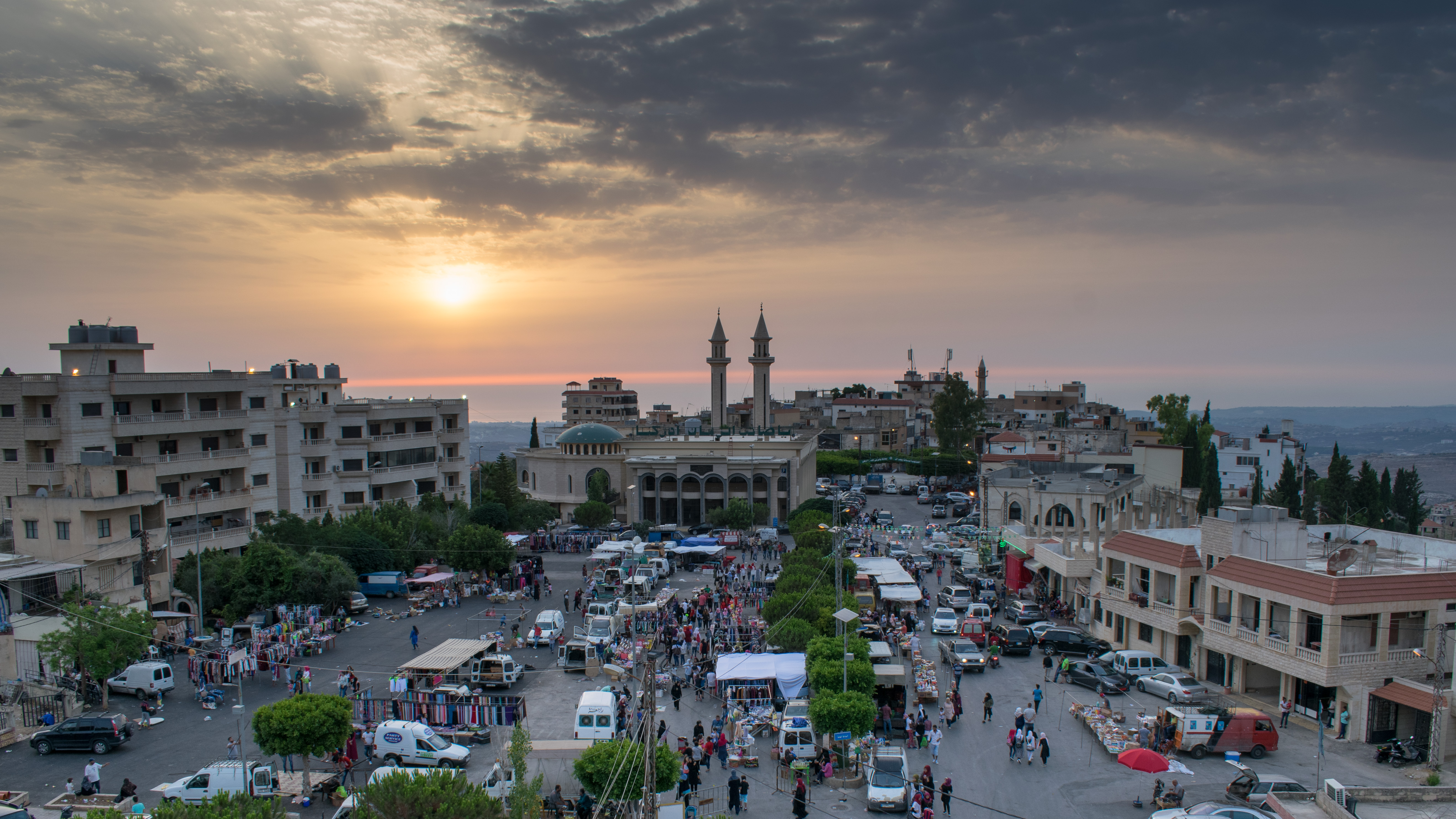
- Tuesday Market - Main Square

- Location within Lebanon
- Coordinates: 33°13′07″N 35°22′33″E
- Grid position: 185/291 PAL
- Country: Lebanon
- Governorate: Nabatieh
- District: Bint Jbeil
- Highest elevation: 670 m (2,200 ft)
- Lowest elevation: 540 m (1,770 ft)
- Time zone: UTC+2 (EET)
  - Summer (DST): UTC+3 (EEST)
- Dialing code: +961

Deir Intar (Dayr Antar, Deir Entar, Arabic: دير انطار) is a municipality in Southern Lebanon in the Bint Jbeil District in Nabatieh Governorate.

== Etymology ==
E. H. Palmer wrote that the name means "the convent of arches".

== Geography ==
It is about 110 kilometres (68 mi) south of Beirut and 25 kilometres (16 mi) east of Tyre, in the heart of what is known as "Jabal Amel".

Its main features include a cave, a main square, and 3 mosques.

== Location ==
The village is surrounded several villages including: Tibnin, As-Sultaniyah, Bir El Sanasel, Al-Majadel, Mahrouna, Mazraat Meshref, Haris, Kfar Dounin, and other southern villages.

== History ==
In 1875 Victor Guérin visited and found here 160 Metualis. He further noted: "Most of the houses show a mixture of old hewn stones and modern materials without character. Several tombs, cisterns, a great press, with two compartments, and a rock-cut tank point to a period of more or less antiquity.'

In 1881, the PEF's Survey of Western Palestine (SWP) described it as: A village, built of stone, containing about 150 Metawileh, situated on a hill, surrounded by olives, fig-trees, and arable land, with waters supplied from birket and cisterns.

On 4 November 2024, Israeli warplanes launched two missiles at Deir Intar Square, neither of which exploded.

== Demographics ==
In 2016 Muslims made up 98.91% of registered voters in Deir Intar. 98.86% of the voters were Shiite Muslims.

=== Municipal ===
Mayor: Mr. Kassem Mohammed Hojeij

=== Monuments ===
==== Religious monuments ====
There are mosques:

- Mosque Imam Mahdi (Almallule)
- Mosque Imam Hussein (Al-Barakah)
- Mosque Imam Ali (Al-shajara)
- Mosque Al-Hamra

The Imam or khatib of Deyrintar are:

- Sheikh Houssain Alatrash
- Sheikh Haitham Youssef Hjej

=== Civilian facilities ===
- The municipal building
- The public square

== Bibliography ==
- Conder, C.R.; Kitchener, H.H. (1881). The Survey of Western Palestine: Memoirs of the Topography, Orography, Hydrography, and Archaeology. Vol. 1. London: Committee of the Palestine Exploration Fund.
- Guérin, V. (1880). Description Géographique Historique et Archéologique de la Palestine (in French). Vol. 3: Galilee, pt. 2. Paris: L'Imprimerie Nationale.
- Palmer, E.H. (1881). The Survey of Western Palestine: Arabic and English Name Lists Collected During the Survey by Lieutenants Conder and Kitchener, R. E. Transliterated and Explained by E.H. Palmer. Committee of the Palestine Exploration Fund.
