= Rashaf =

Rashaf رشاف
- Municipality
- Location within Lebanon
- Coordinates: 33°08′35″N 35°21′46″E
- Grid position: 184/283 PAL
- Country: Lebanon
- Governorate: Nabatieh Governorate
- District: Bint Jbeil District
- Elevation: 700 m (2,300 ft)
- Time zone: UTC+2 (EET)
  - Summer (DST): UTC+3 (EEST)

Rashaf or Rshaf (Arabic: رشاف, romanized: Rashāf) is a municipality in the Bint Jbeil District of the Nabatieh Governorate of Southern Lebanon, 6 kilometres from the Israel-Lebanon border.

== Etymology ==
According to Palmer, the name means "morass" or "bog.

== Location ==
Rashaf is situated 106 km from Beirut, on a hill overlooking Srobbine and Debel villages. It covers an area of 608 hectares and is located 750m above sea level. The following villages border Rashaf : Srobbine - Debel - Al Tiri - Haddatha - Beit Leif. It can be reached by several routes, such as the following : Sour - Aain Baal - Qana - Siddiqine - Kafra - Hariss - Haddatha - Rashaf

== History ==
In 1596, it was named as a village, ar-Rasaf, in the Ottoman nahiya (subdistrict) of Tibnin under the liwa' (district) of Safad, with a population of 51 households, all Muslim. The villagers paid a fixed tax rate of 25% on agricultural products, such as wheat, barley, fruit trees, goats and beehives, in addition to "occasional revenues"; a total of 2,720 akçe.

In 1881, the PEF's Survey of Western Palestine (SWP) described it: "A stone village, containing about 100 Metawileh, situated on a hill-top, with a few grapes, figs and olives, and arable cultivation; there is a spring near and cisterns in the village; also a birket for cattle.”

Following the 1982 invasion Rashaf became part of the Israeli ‘security zone’. On 29 September 1992, following 5 days of clashes between Hizbullah and the South Lebanon Army, Hizbullah attacked the SLA position in Rashaf with Katyusha rockets. In the ensuing battle 2 SLA and 4 Hizbullah men were killed.

== Demographics ==
In 2014 Muslims made up 99.49% of registered voters in Rashaf. 98.20% of the voters were Shiite Muslims.

The registered population is estimated at 3,200 people. During the winter, the number of residents is approximately 300, a number which increases to 1,500 during summer. The low number of residents is because Rashaf was under Israeli occupation, which forced most of the residents to immigrate to the southern suburbs of Beirut and Sour, Aaitit, Al Rmadiyeh, Al Sarafand and Al Bazouriyeh. Despite the Israeli retreat in 2000, migrants did not return to their village. However, the village has witnessed some renewed construction activities, with 200 additional houses built. There are 250 houses in the village distributed across 12 quarters: El Dayaa - Al Saha, Al Bayyad, Khalet El Maghara, Sahlet El Zaitoun, Al Roués, Al Dabsh Al Sharky, Al Dabsh Al Gharby, Al Assi, Al Maabour, Aain Jdeidah, Al Sowan, and Al Aaqaba.

== Voters ==
The number of registered voters May 2004 was 1,690 (832 males and 858 females) compared to 1,505 voters in 2000, distributed mainly between 24 families.

== Local Authorities ==
The village has a municipal council composed of 12 members. It was recently founded, based on the decision of the Minister of Interior and Municipalities no. 8 dated January 13, 2004. Rashaf has two mayors, one residing in the village and the other residing in Beirut southern suburb. The revenues that the municipality received from the independent municipal council in 2002 stood at LBP 115 million.

== Educational and social institutions ==
The village has one primary public school with 26 registered students as of October 2004 - 9 in kindergarten and 17 in primary cycle. The school has 5 teachers. The total number of students in Rashaf is about 50, most of them registered in schools in Kafra and Bint Jbeil.

== Economic Activities ==
The cultivated area constitutes only 5.6% of total land, while the arable land reaches 37% of the total area. The main products cultivated are olives, grains and tobacco. The Lebanese Reggie for Tobacco and Tombacs buys the entire tobacco production of the 22 farmers in the village. Oil, grains and other agricultural goods (tomatoes, cantaloupes, etc.) produced are sold in the village. Moreover, the production of honey is estimated at 500 kg, which is sold inside the village at LBP 20,000-30,000/kilo.

== Problems ==
The major problem in Rashaf is the emigration to other towns and cities. Furthermore, the village lacks a sewage system, which forces the residents to use cesspools. The poor health services due to the lack of dispensaries in the village forces the villagers to go to the dispensaries and hospitals located outside the village such as Tebnin Governmental Hospital (8 km away) or Salah Ghandour Hospital (7 km away).

== Bibliography ==
- Conder, C.R.; Kitchener, H.H. (1881). The Survey of Western Palestine: Memoirs of the Topography, Orography, Hydrography, and Archaeology. Vol. 1. London: Committee of the Palestine Exploration Fund.
- Hütteroth, W.-D.; Abdulfattah, K. (1977). Historical Geography of Palestine, Transjordan and Southern Syria in the Late 16th Century. Erlanger Geographische Arbeiten, Sonderband 5. Erlangen, Germany: Vorstand der Fränkischen Geographischen Gesellschaft. ISBN 3-920405-41-2.
- Palmer, E.H. (1881). The Survey of Western Palestine: Arabic and English Name Lists Collected During the Survey by Lieutenants Conder and Kitchener, R. E. Transliterated and Explained by E.H. Palmer. Committee of the Palestine Exploration Fund.
- Rhode, H. (1979). Administration and Population of the Sancak of Safed in the Sixteenth Century. Columbia University. Archived from the original on 2019-04-20.
