= Shaqra, Lebanon =

Chaqra شقرا
- Village
- Shaqra
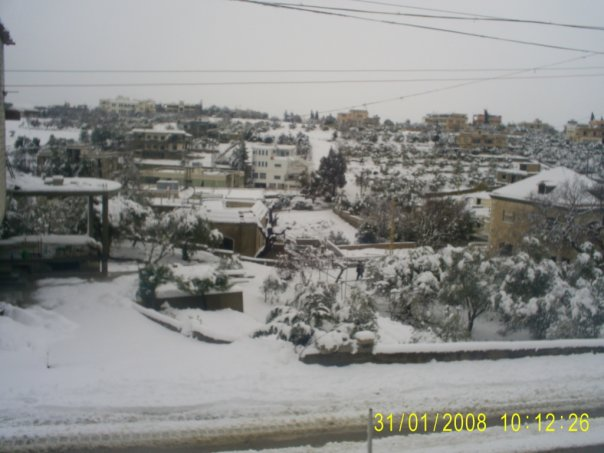
- Chaqra in Winter

- Location within Lebanon
- Coordinates: 33°11′30″N 35°27′46″E
- Grid position: 193/288 PAL (village); 198/289 PAL (castle)
- Country: Lebanon
- Governorate: Nabatieh
- District: Bint Jbeil

Government
  - Mukhtar: Subhi Haidar Khalaf
- Elevation: 620 m (2,030 ft)

Population
  - Total: 12,000
- Time zone: UTC+2 (GMT)
  - Summer (DST): UTC+3 (EEST)
- Postal code: 0000
- Dialing code: (+961) 07
- Website: http://chaqradubay.org/

Shaqra (also spelt Chaqra, Chakra or even Chacra in French spellings; Arabic: شقرا [ALA-LC: Shaqrā]), officially Chaqra and Doubay (Arabic: شقرا ودوبيه Shaqra wa Dubay), is a municipality in southern Lebanon, 116 km from Beirut; located in the Bint Jbeil District. It consists of two parts: the village Chaqra; while Doubay (or Qal'at ad-Dubba), located about 4 km west of the village, is a castle dating at least to the Crusader era. Shaqra's inhabitants are called the Shaqrawis (French spelling: Chaqraouis).

== Geography ==
The town is bounded to the northeast by Houla, to the east by Mais al-Jabal, to the southeast by Muhaibib, to the north by Majdel Selem, to the west by Safad El Battikh and Baraashit. It is located 6.8 km from the Golan Heights and the southern border of Lebanon.

== Transport ==
To get there, you have to take the national 3 which goes from Beirut to Tyre, then the road to Bint-Jbeil.

== Demographics ==
In 2014 Muslims made up 99.61% of registered voters in Chaqra. 98.57% of the voters were Shiite Muslims.

There are 7,000 inhabitants in winter, which increases to about 12,000 during the summer months.

== Etymology ==
- Chaqra: means blonde.
- Kulat ed Dubbeh: means "The bear's castle".

== History ==
In 1596, it was named as a village, Saqra, in the Ottoman nahiya (subdistrict) of Tibnin under the Liwa Safad. It had a population of 58 households and 3 bachelors, all Muslim. The villagers paid a fixed tax rate of 25% on agricultural products, such as wheat (6,760 akçe), barley (560 akçe), olive trees (1,500 akçe), goats and beehives (520 akçe), in addition to occasional revenues (300 akçe); an olive oil press/press for grape syrup (12 akçe), a water mill (60 akçe); a total of 9,712 akçe.

In 1875 Victor Guérin noted: "This village is located on a plateau growing with wheat, or dotted with olive trees. It has 300 inhabitants, all Métu'alis. The mosque, facing from west to east, seems to have replaced an old church, from which it borrowed a number of beautiful ashlars []. Two (artificial) pools, now very poorly maintained, and a dozen cisterns also attest to the existence in this place of a village prior to the Arab invasion".

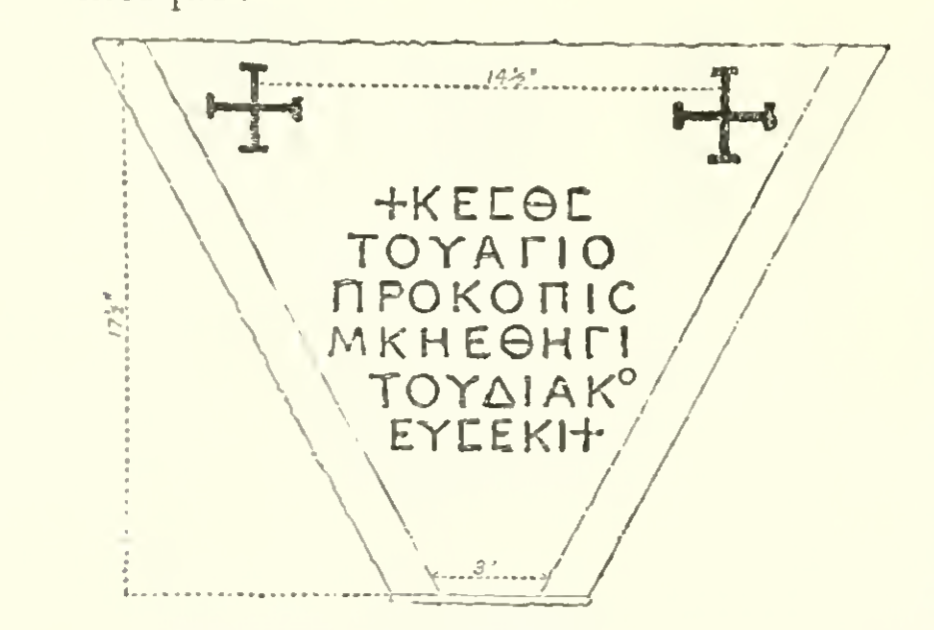
12th century Greek inscription in Chaqra, copied by Kitchener.

In 1877, H.H. Kitchener visited the area. After describing the castle, he continues: "To the west of the castle is the village of Chaqra, where I obtained a copy of an inscription. The sheikh of the village was extremely rude, and threw stones against the inscription when I attempted to copy it. I therefore left without doing so, and reported the matter to the governor, who immediately put the sheikh in prison. The next time I went to the village there was no opposition to my copying the inscription, I therefore had the sheikh set at liberty."

In 1881, the PEF's Survey of Western Palestine described the village (which it called Shakra) as being "built of stone, containing about 200 Metawileh, on high-level plain, surrounded by olives and arable land; there is a mosque in the village; two birkets and several cisterns give the water supply." They further added that there were: "Several ruined modern buildings and remains of ancient ruins; several lintels and cisterns; Greek inscription on capital of column built into wall of modern house to the south-west of the mosque: [ ] There probably once stood an early Christian church here."

=== Doubay or Qal'at ad-Dubba ===
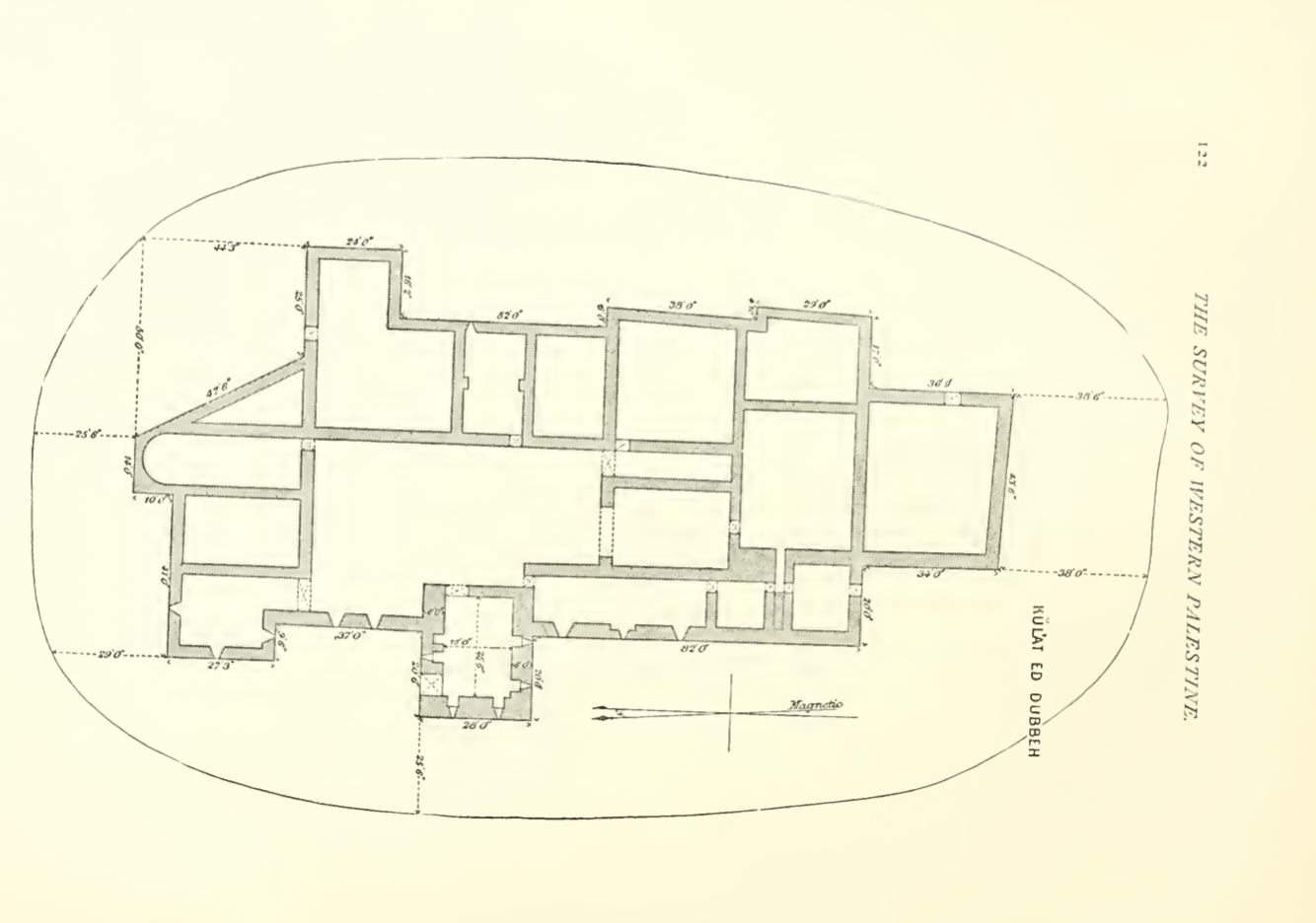
Plan of castle Note the room with a semi-circular end, facing the main court-yard. Enlart took this to be a Crusader chapel. Due to the orientation Pringle disagreed, instead thinking it was post-Crusaders.

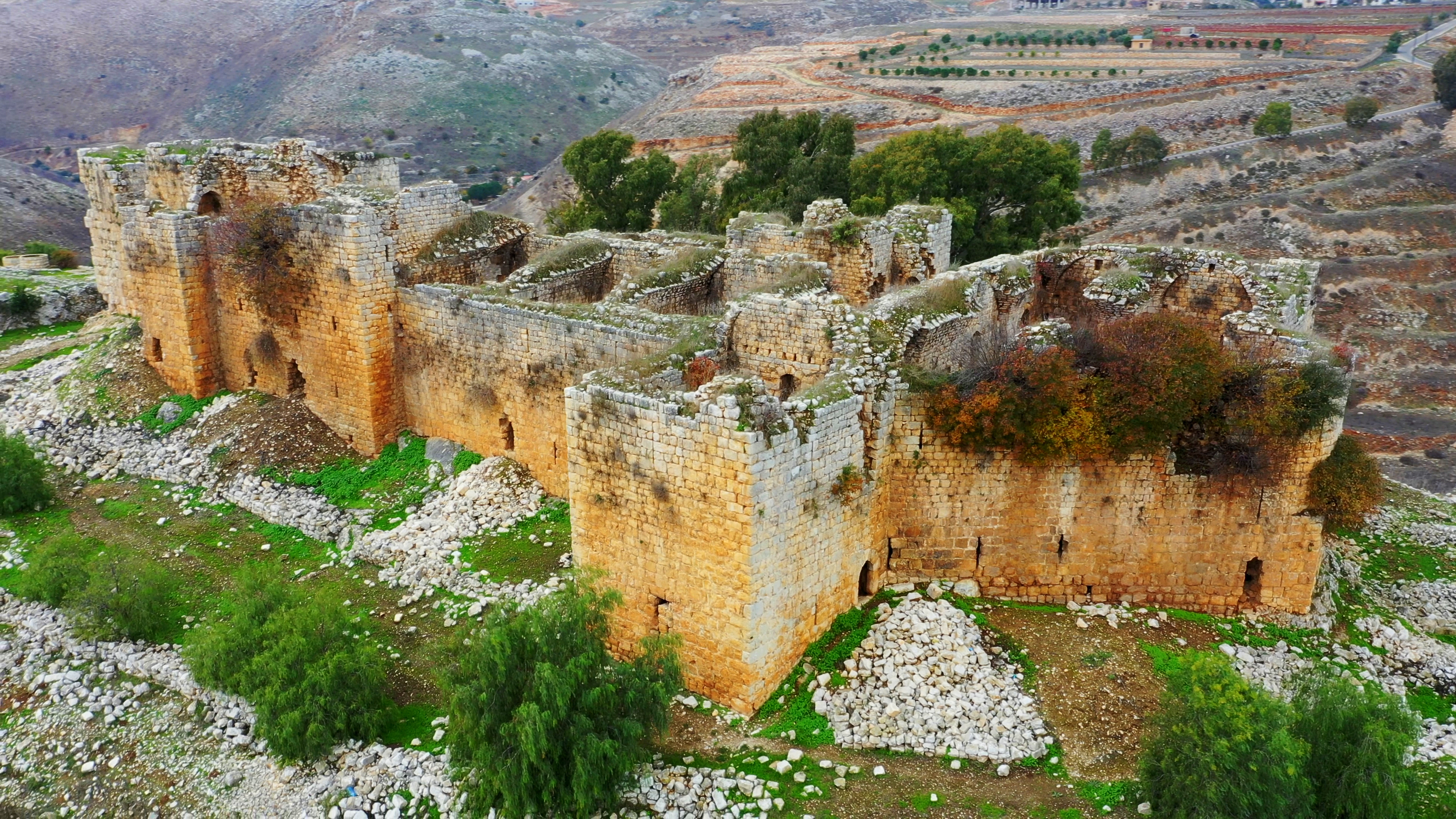
Castle of Chaqra and Doubiye

The castle of Shaqra and Doubiye, also called Qalaat Doubal, Kulat ed Dubbeh, and Qal'at Ad-Dubba, is located in a valley about 4 km East of Chaqra.

According to Pringle, "Although largely rebuilt in Mamluk or Ottoman times, it incorporates a tower (8.5 by 10,3 m) and other structures which betray a Frankish origin,"

In 1875 Victor Guérin noted "the remains of a small fortress of Muslim work and called Kala't Doubey. Surrounded by a moat now half filled and planted with tobacco, it was built with fairly coarsely carved blocks. Several of the square towers that flank it are still inhabited at this time by some families of Métualis, who settled in the middle of its ruins and contain their herds.

In 1881, the PEF's Survey of Western Palestine described the castle (which it called Kulat ed Dubbeh):

There are here the foundations of a Crusading castle, on which a Saracenic tower has been erected. The castle was of small size, and surrounded by a moat. Situated on a steep and narrow spur running into the great Wady Selukieh, it protected the northern road that led up that valley, and also made a connecting link between Hunin and Tibnin. It was probably built at the same time as the latter fortress by Hugues de Saint Omer, Prince of Tiberias, about the year 1104 A.D. The special plan gives the general plan and arrangements of the castle, which was rebuilt by the Saracens to act both as a khan and a castle. The masonry is small but good and regular, the arches are all pointed, and the work appears to be of the same date as the Khans at Minia and Jubb Yusef, along the Damascus road. Some large drafted stones built into the walls show the Crusading origin of the castle, and bear a striking resemblance to the remains of that date at Tibnin.

There is a rock-cut birkeh near, and between eight and ten rock-cut cisterns for water. There are also six sarcophagi cut in the rock.

The castle has a romantic and beautiful appearance, as it is not visible till quite close, on account of the high ground all round.

In July 2026, the Mount Amel Castles, including the Dubieh Castle, were designated by UNESCO as a World Heritage Site and immediately classified as endangered.

== Economy ==
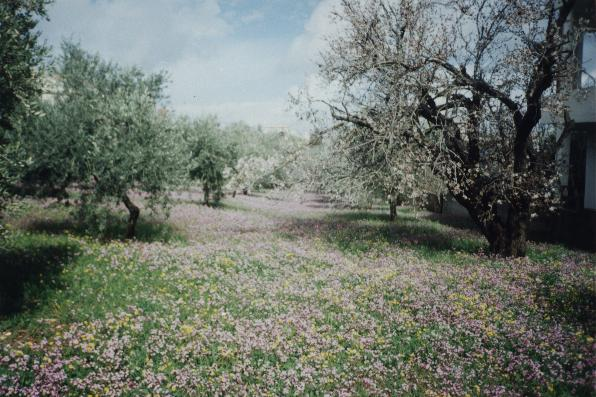
olive trees in Chaqra in spring

The village lives on small trade, agriculture and a strong poultry economy.

== Administration ==
The village is administered by a mayor assisted by municipal councillors.

Chaqra is divided into two parts:

- Chaqra as such which is the upper part and which is inhabited;
- Doubiye, which is located in the valley, uninhabited and housing Doubiye Castle, which was built on the ruins of a Roman-era building, and said to be renamed after a French Crusade commander.

== See also ==
- List of Crusader castles

== Bibliography ==
- Conder, C.R. (1894). "Greek inscriptions in Western Palestine". Quarterly Statement - Palestine Exploration Fund. 26: 201–203.
- Conder, C.R.; Kitchener, H.H. (1881). The Survey of Western Palestine: Memoirs of the Topography, Orography, Hydrography, and Archaeology. Vol. 1. London: Committee of the Palestine Exploration Fund.
- Enlart, C. (1929). Les Monuments des Croisés dans le Royaume de Jérusalem (in French). Vol. 2. Paris. pp. 266–7.
- Guérin, V. (1880). Description Géographique Historique et Archéologique de la Palestine (in French). Vol. 3: Galilee, pt. 2. Paris: L'Imprimerie Nationale.
- Hütteroth, W.-D.; Abdulfattah, K. (1977). Historical Geography of Palestine, Transjordan and Southern Syria in the Late 16th Century. Erlanger Geographische Arbeiten, Sonderband 5. Erlangen, Germany: Vorstand der Fränkischen Geographischen Gesellschaft. ISBN 3-920405-41-2.
- Kitchener, H.H. (1877). "Lieutenant Kitchener's reports". Quarterly Statement - Palestine Exploration Fund. 9: 116-125, 165-178.
- Palmer, E. H. (1881). The Survey of Western Palestine: Arabic and English Name Lists Collected During the Survey by Lieutenants Conder and Kitchener, R. E. Transliterated and Explained by E.H. Palmer. Committee of the Palestine Exploration Fund.
- Pringle, D. (1997). Secular buildings in the Crusader Kingdom of Jerusalem: an archaeological Gazetter. Cambridge University Press. ISBN 0521-46010-7.
- Pringle, D. (1998). The Churches of the Crusader Kingdom of Jerusalem: L-Z (exluding Tyre). Vol. II. Cambridge University Press. ISBN 0-521-39037-0.
- Rhode, H. (1979). Administration and Population of the Sancak of Safed in the Sixteenth Century (PhD). Columbia University. Archived from the original on 2020-03-01.
