= Bint Jbeil District =

Coordinates: 33°07′15″N 35°26′1″E

- District
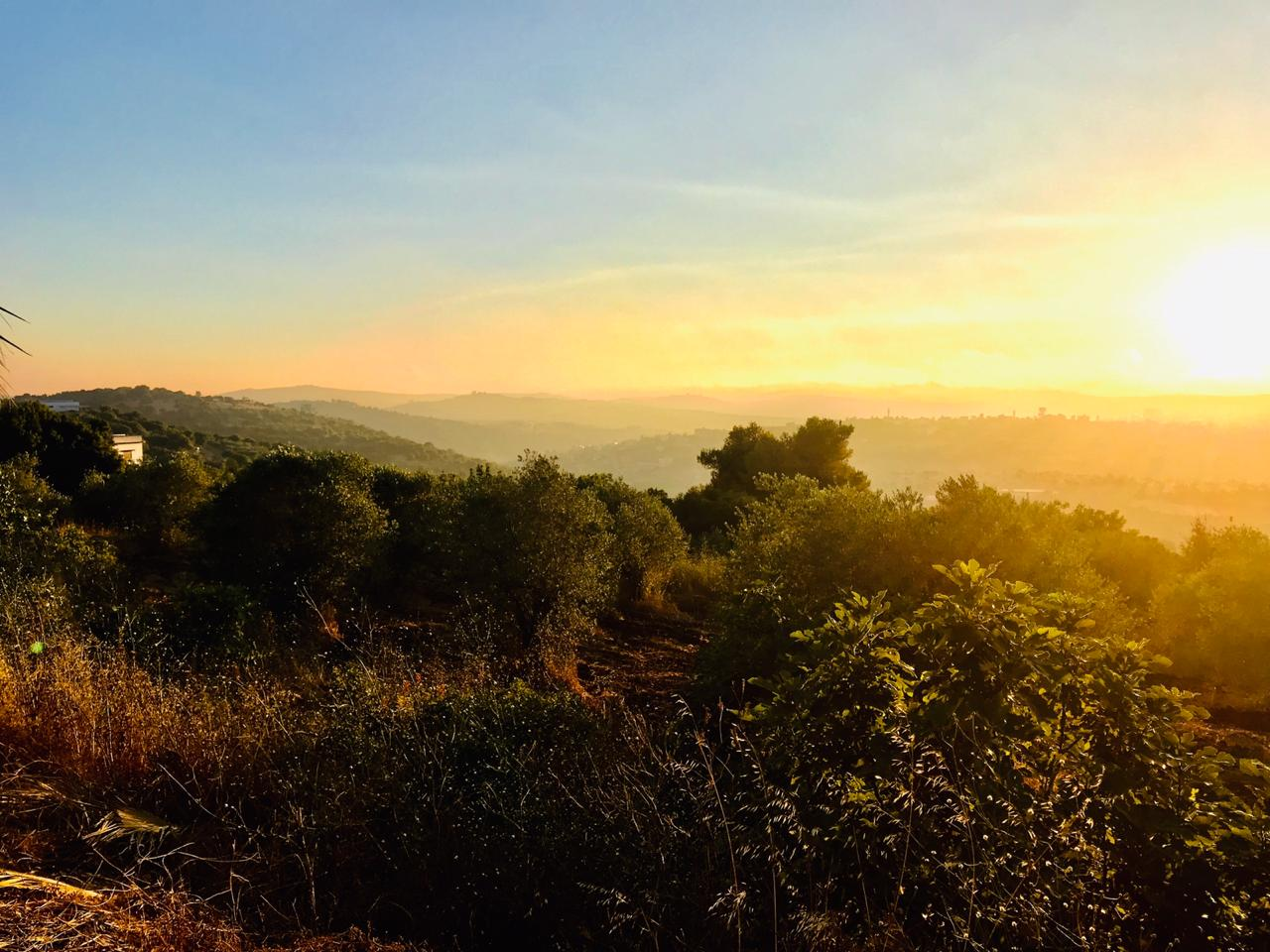
- Baydar, Bint Jbeil District

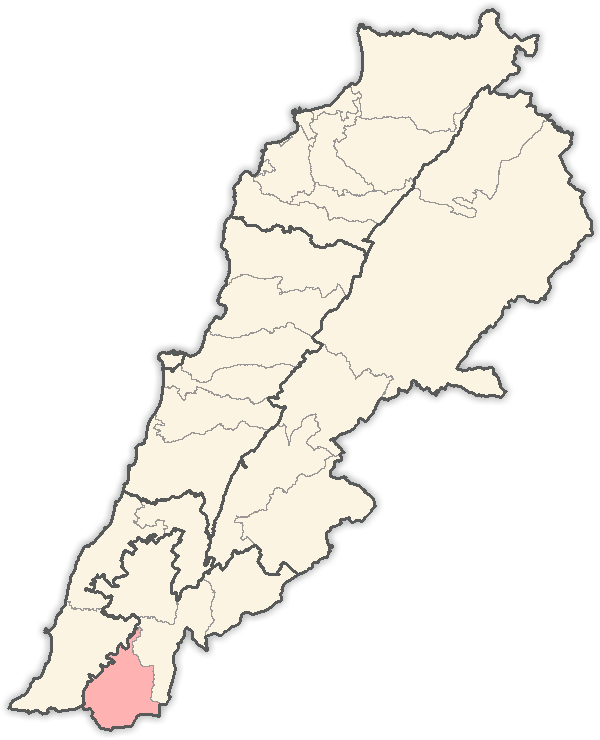
- Location in Lebanon
- Country: Lebanon
- Governorate: Nabatiyeh Governorate
- Capital: Bint Jbeil

Area
  - Total: 153.6 sq mi (397.7 km^{2})

Population
  - Estimate (31 December 2017): 104,862
- Time zone: UTC+2 (EET)
  - Summer (DST): UTC+3 (EEST)

The Bint Jbeil District (Arabic: قضاء بنت جبيل, Qaḍāʾ Bint Jubayl) is a district in the Nabatiyeh Governorate of Lebanon. The capital of the district is Bint Jbeil, which was demolished by Israel in April of 2026.

== Municipalities ==
The following 36 municipalities are all located in the Bint Jbeil District:

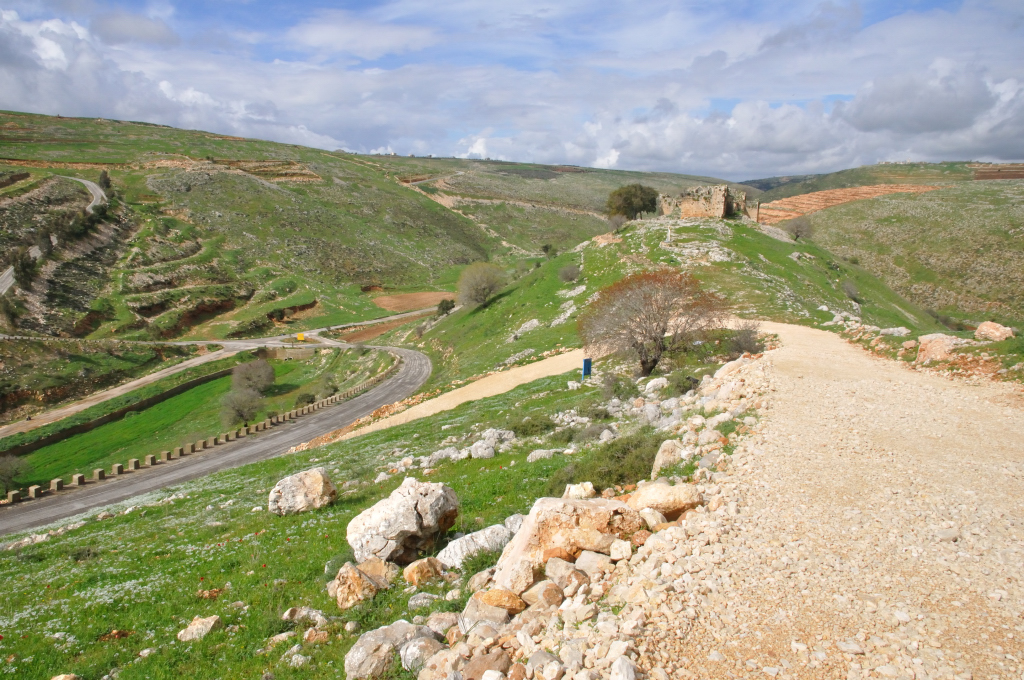
Fortress in Bint Jbeil District

- Ain Ebel
- Aitaroun
- Aynata
- Ayta al-Jabal
- Ayta ash-Shaab
- Beit Lif
- Beit Yahoun
- Bint Jbeil
- Baraashit
- Burj Qalaouiyah
- Deir Intar
- Debel
- Froun
- Al-Ghandouriyah
- Haddatha
- Hanin
- Haris
- Al-Jumayjimah
- Kafra
- Kfar Dounin
- Kherbet Selem
- Kounin
- Maroun al-Ras
- Qalaouiyah
- Al-Qaouzah
- Rashaf
- Ramiyah
- Rmaish
- Safad al-Battikh
- Shaqra
- Srobbin
- As-Sultaniyah
- Tibnin
- At-Tiri
- Yaroun
- Yatar

== Demographics ==
According to registered voters in 2014:

| Year | Christians | | | | Muslims | | | | Druze |
| Year | Total | Maronites | Greek Catholics | Other Christians | Total | Shias | Sunnis | Alawites | Druze |
|---|---|---|---|---|---|---|---|---|---|
| 2014 | 11.54% | 8.84% | 2.24% | 0.46% | 88.16% | 86.80% | 1.35% | 0.01% | 0.01% |
| 2022 | 12.02% | 9.32% | 2.03% | 0.67% | 87.98% | 86.50% | 1.48% | 0.00% | 0.00% |
| 2026 | 10.45% | 8.29% | 1.98% | 0.18% | 89.55% | 89.55% | —N/a | 0.00% | 0.00% |
