= Ayta al-Jabal =

Village in Nabatieh Governorate, Lebanon

Ayta al-Jabal, Ayta az-Zutt عيتا الجبل، عيتا الزط
- Municipality
- Location within Lebanon
- Coordinates: 33°10′32″N 35°24′28″E
- Grid position: 188/286 PAL
- Country: Lebanon
- Governorate: Nabatieh Governorate
- District: Bint Jbeil District

Area
  - Total: 4.99 km^{2} (1.93 sq mi)
- Elevation: 680 m (2,230 ft)
- Time zone: UTC+2 (EET)
  - Summer (DST): UTC+3 (EEST)

Ayta al-Jabal or Aayta Ej Jabal (Arabic: عيتا الجبل, romanized: ʿAytā al-Jabal), also Ayta az-Zutt (Arabic: عيتا الزط, romanized: ʿAytā az-Zuṭṭ), is a municipality in Nabatiye Governorate, in the Bint Jbeil District of southern Lebanon, about 112 kilometres (70 mi) from Beirut. The village is situated in the southern outskirts of the town of Tibnin, in the heart of the Lebanese Shia Muslim community of Jabal Amel. The village sits on an elevation of 680 metres (2,230 ft) above sea level.

== History ==
=== Antiquity ===
Ayta al-Jabal is identified with Beth 'Ayit (Hebrew: בית עיט), a place referenced in the Baraita on the "Boundaries of the Land of Israel" as part of the delineation of the northwestern border of Jewish resettlement following the return from Babylonian exile. Scholarly analysis suggests that this text likely describes a later era, possibly the Hasmonean or Herodian periods, during the 2nd or 1st century BCE.

=== Ottoman period ===
In the 1596 Ottoman tax records, the village, named 'Ayta al-Gajar, was located in the Ottoman nahiya (subdistrict) of Tibnin under the Liwa of Safad, with a population of 12 households and 3 bachelors, all Muslim. The villagers paid a fixed tax-rate of 25% on agricultural products, such as wheat (2,600 akçe), barley (1,400 akçe), olive trees (500 akçe), goats and beehives (400 akçe), in addition to "occasional revenues" (137 akçe) and a press for olive oil or grape syrup (12 akçe); a total of 5,049 akçe. Part of the revenue went to a waqf.

In 1856 it was named Aithat et Tut on Kiepert's map of Palestine/Lebanon published that year, while in 1875, Victor Guérin passed by and noted: “to my left, beyond a wadi, [is] the village of A'ïtha, on a high hill; it does not look very considerable and is inhabited by Metualis."

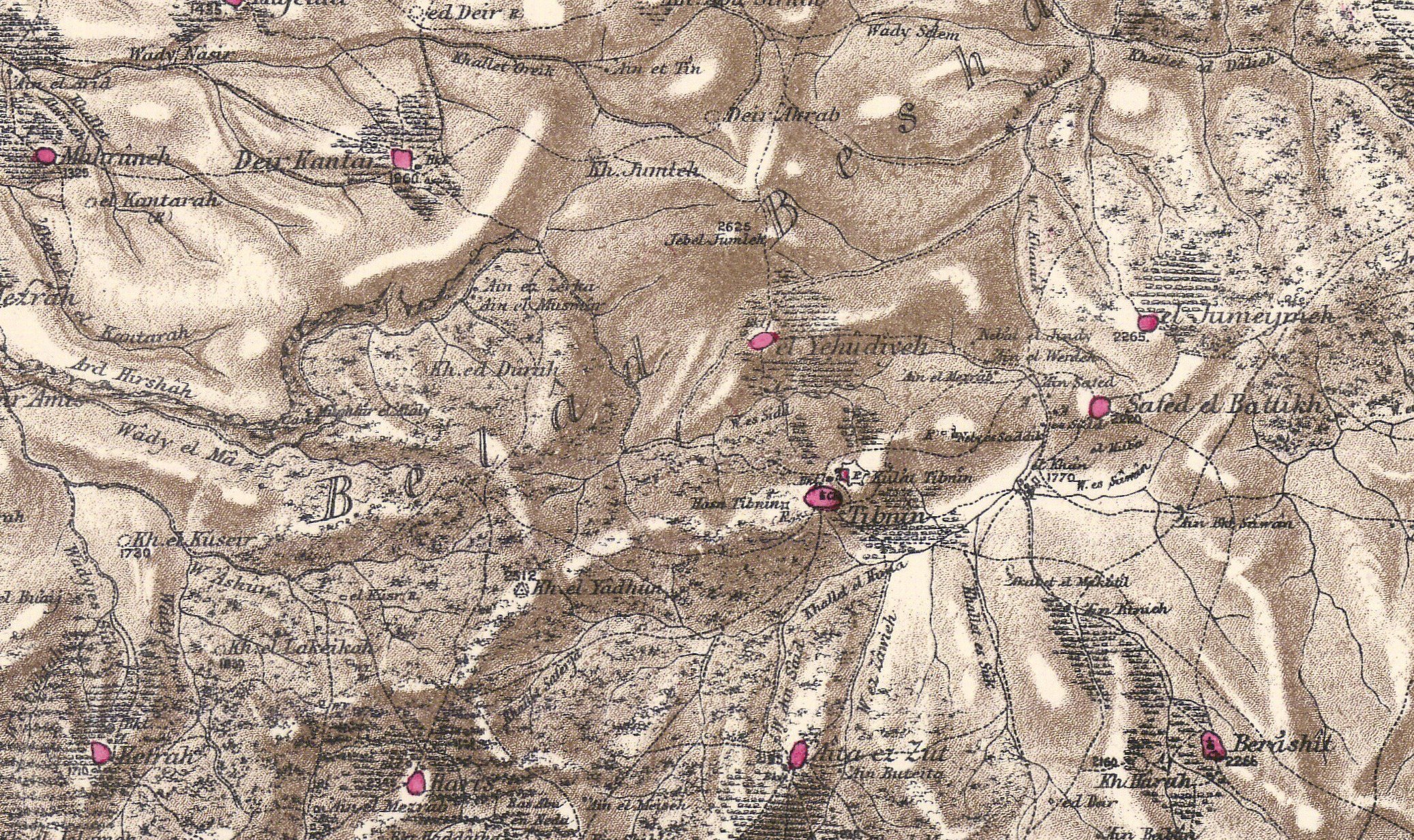
Ayta al-Jabal shown amongst the villages surrounding Tebnine in the 1880s PEF Survey of Palestine.

In 1881, the Palestine Exploration Fund's Survey of Western Palestine (SWP) described the village (which it called 'Aita ez Zut): "A village, built of stone, containing about fifty Metawileh, situated on a hill-top, with figs, olives, and arable land around. There are two cisterns in the village."

=== French rule ===
The current Bint Jbeil province was created in 1922 by French mandatory authorities.

== Demographics ==
In 2014 Muslims made up 99.54% of registered voters in Ayta al-Jabal. 98.13% of the voters were Shiite Muslims.

== Notable people from Ayta al-Jabal ==
- Youssef Mohamad, footballer

== Bibliography ==
- Conder, C.R.; Kitchener, H.H. (1881). The Survey of Western Palestine: Memoirs of the Topography, Orography, Hydrography, and Archaeology. Vol. 1. London: Committee of the Palestine Exploration Fund.
- Guérin, V. (1880). Description Géographique Historique et Archéologique de la Palestine (in French). Vol. 3: Galilee, pt. 2. Paris: L'Imprimerie Nationale.
- Hütteroth, W.-D.; Abdulfattah, K. (1977). Historical Geography of Palestine, Transjordan and Southern Syria in the Late 16th Century. Erlanger Geographische Arbeiten, Sonderband 5. Erlangen, Germany: Vorstand der Fränkischen Geographischen Gesellschaft. ISBN 3-920405-41-2.
- Palmer, E.H. (1881). The Survey of Western Palestine: Arabic and English Name Lists Collected During the Survey by Lieutenants Conder and Kitchener, R. E. Transliterated and Explained by E.H. Palmer. Committee of the Palestine Exploration Fund.
- Rhode, H. (1979). Administration and Population of the Sancak of Safed in the Sixteenth Century (PhD). Columbia University. Archived from the original on 2019-04-20.
