= Al-Ghandouriyah =

Al-Ghandouriyah الغندوريه
- Municipality
- Location within Lebanon
- Coordinates: 33°16′20″N 35°25′52″E
- Grid position: 190/297 PAL
- Country: Lebanon
- Governorate: Nabatieh Governorate
- District: Bint Jbeil
- Elevation: 430 m (1,410 ft)
- Time zone: UTC+2 (EET)
  - Summer (DST): UTC+3 (EEST)

Al-Ghandouriyah (Arabic: الغندوريه, romanized: al-Ghandūriyah) is a municipality in Lebanon located in the Bint Jbeil District, south of Froun. It was formerly known as Aidib.

== Etymology ==
In the 1800s, the village was called Aidib, and E. H. Palmer wrote in 1881 that the name came from a local form connected with “much sand”.

== History ==
In 1881, the PEF's Survey of Western Palestine (SWP) described Aidib as: "A small village, built of stone and mud, situated on the slope of a hill and surrounded by a few fig-trees and olives. It contains about ninety Metawileh, and is supplied with water from three rock-cut cisterns and a spring."

During the 2006 Israeli offensive against Hizbollah Israeli Nahal commandos were airlifted into Al-Ghandouriyah. A column of tanks attempting to reach them was ambushed in Wadi Salouqi. Eleven tanks were hit and seventeen Israeli soldiers killed, with fifty wounded.

== Demographics ==
In 2014 Muslims made up 100% of registered voters in Al-Ghandouriyah. 99.59% of the voters were Shiite Muslims.

== Bibliography ==
- Conder, C.R.; Kitchener, H.H. (1881). The Survey of Western Palestine: Memoirs of the Topography, Orography, Hydrography, and Archaeology. Vol. 1. London: Committee of the Palestine Exploration Fund.
- Palmer, E.H. (1881). The Survey of Western Palestine: Arabic and English Name Lists Collected During the Survey by Lieutenants Conder and Kitchener, R. E. Transliterated and Explained by E.H. Palmer. Committee of the Palestine Exploration Fund.
