= Qalaouiyah =

Qalaouiyah قلويه
- Municipality
- Location within Lebanon
- Coordinates: 33°15′19″N 35°25′03″E
- Grid position: 189/295 PAL
- Country: Lebanon
- Governorate: Nabatieh
- District: Bint Jbeil
- Elevation: 400 m (1,300 ft)
- Time zone: UTC+2 (EET)
  - Summer (DST): UTC+3 (EEST)
- Dialing code: +961

Qalaouiyah (Arabic: قلويه, romanized: Qalawiyah) is a municipality in the Bint Jbeil District in southern Lebanon.

== Etymology ==
According to E. H. Palmer, the name Kalawei comes from the ancient Kelabo.

== History ==
In 1881, the PEF's Survey of Western Palestine (SWP) described Burj Alawei as: “A village, built of stone, on high ground, containing 150 Metawileh, surrounded by olives, fig-trees, and arable land. The water supply is from cisterns only." They further noted: "Ancient remains and some lintels."

== Demographics ==
In 2014 Muslims made up 99.41% of registered voters in Qalaouiyah. 98.22% of the voters were Shiite Muslims.

== Bibliography ==
- Conder, C.R.; Kitchener, H.H. (1881). The Survey of Western Palestine: Memoirs of the Topography, Orography, Hydrography, and Archaeology. Vol. 1. London: Committee of the Palestine Exploration Fund.
- Palmer, E.H. (1881). The Survey of Western Palestine: Arabic and English Name Lists Collected During the Survey by Lieutenants Conder and Kitchener, R. E. Transliterated and Explained by E.H. Palmer. Committee of the Palestine Exploration Fund.
