= Burj Qalaouiyah =

Burj Qalaouiyah برج قلويه
- Municipality
- Location within Lebanon
- Coordinates: 33°15′38″N 35°25′08″E
- Grid position: 189/296 PAL
- Country: Lebanon
- Governorate: Nabatieh
- District: Bint Jbeil
- Elevation: 470 m (1,540 ft)
- Time zone: UTC+2 (EET)
  - Summer (DST): UTC+3 (EEST)
- Dialing code: +961

Burj Qalaouiyah (Arabic: برج قلويه, romanized: Burj Qalawiyah) is a municipality in the Bint Jbeil District in southern Lebanon.

== Etymology ==
According to E. H. Palmer, the name Burj el Alawei means "the tower of the Alawei".

== History ==
In 1881, the PEF's Survey of Western Palestine (SWP) described Burj Alawei as: “A village, built of stone, containing about 300 Metawileh, situated on upland, with a few olives, figs, and some arable land round. The water supply is from a well and spring.”

On 13 March 2026, during the 2026 Lebanon war, 12 people were killed in an Israeli airstrike on a medical centre, killing several paramedics and doctors.

== Demographics ==
In 2014 Muslims made up 98.97% of registered voters in Burj Qalaouiyah. 97.71% of the voters were Shiite Muslims.

== Bibliography ==
- Conder, C.R.; Kitchener, H.H. (1881). The Survey of Western Palestine: Memoirs of the Topography, Orography, Hydrography, and Archaeology. Vol. 1. London: Committee of the Palestine Exploration Fund.
- Palmer, E.H. (1881). The Survey of Western Palestine: Arabic and English Name Lists Collected During the Survey by Lieutenants Conder and Kitchener, R. E. Transliterated and Explained by E.H. Palmer. Committee of the Palestine Exploration Fund.
