= Safad al-Battikh =

Village in Nabatieh Governorate, Lebanon

Safad al-Battikh صفد البطيخ
- Municipality
- Location within Lebanon
- Coordinates: 33°12′00″N 35°25′58″E
- Grid position: 190/289 PAL
- Country: Lebanon
- Governorate: Nabatieh Governorate
- District: Bint Jbeil District

Area
  - Total: 1.69 km^{2} (0.65 sq mi)
- Elevation: 680 m (2,230 ft)
- Time zone: UTC+2 (EET)
  - Summer (DST): UTC+3 (EEST)

Safad al-Battikh (Arabic: صفد البطيخ, romanized: Ṣafad al-Baṭṭīkh) is a municipality in Nabatiye Governorate, in the Bint Jbeil District of southern Lebanon, about 111 kilometres (69 mi) from Beirut. The village is situated in the north eastern outskirts of the town of Tebnine, in the heart of the Lebanese Shia Muslim community of Jabal Amel. The village is 680 metres (2,230 ft) above sea level.

== History ==
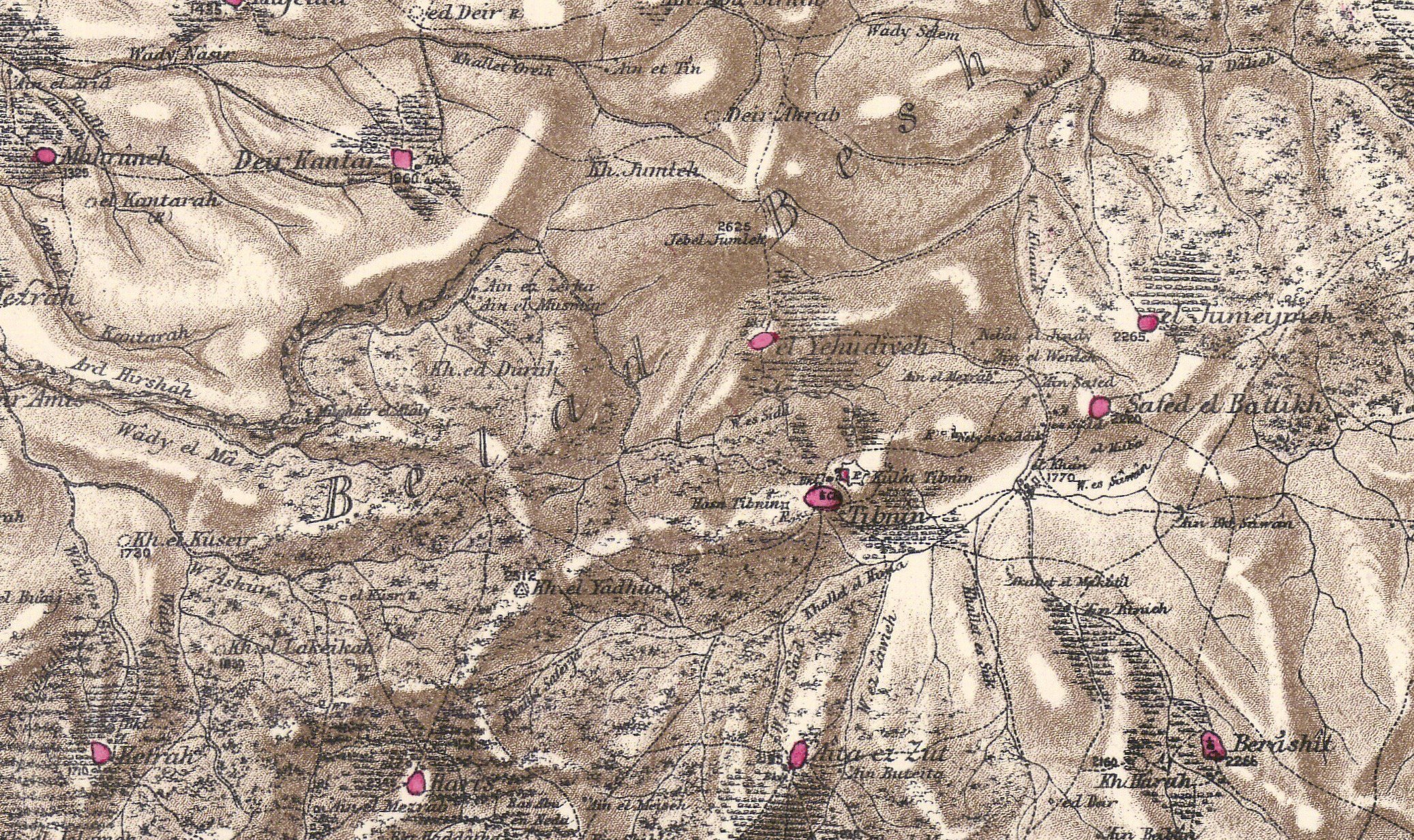
Safad El Battikh shown amongst the villages surrounding Tebnine in the 1880s PEF Survey of Palestine.

In the 1596 Ottoman tax records, the village, named صفد البطيخ (same as today but some history books transliterate differently such as Safad al-Battih), was located in the Ottoman nahiya (subdistrict) of Tibnin under the Liwa of Safad, with a population of 10 households and 2 bachelors, all Muslim. The villagers paid a fixed tax-rate of 25% on agricultural products, such as wheat (1,300 akçe), barley (420 akçe), fruit trees (380 akçe), goats and beehives (20 akçe), in addition to "occasional revenues" (80 akçe); a total of 2,200 akçe.

In 1856 it was named Safed on Kiepert's map of Palestine/Lebanon published that year, while in 1875, Victor Guérin passed by and noted: "to my left, on a high hill, the small village of Safed el-Bathikha, inhabited by both Métualis and Christians."

In 1881, the PEF's Survey of Western Palestine (SWP) described the village (which it called Safed el Battîkh): "A village, built of stone, containing about 100 Metawileh and fifty Christians, situated on hill-top, surrounded by arable land. The water supply is from several perennial springs and ten cisterns in the village."

=== Modern era ===
The current Bint Jbeil province was created in 1922 by French colonials.

In 2009, there were 125 members of the Lady of the Assumption parish of the Melkite Church in the village.

== Demographics ==
In 2014 Muslims made up 64.37% and Christians made up 35.45% of registered voters in Safad al-Battikh. 63.06% of the voters were Shiite Muslims and 26.21% were Greek Catholics.

== Bibliography ==
- Conder, C.R.; Kitchener, H.H. (1881). The Survey of Western Palestine: Memoirs of the Topography, Orography, Hydrography, and Archaeology. Vol. 1. London: Committee of the Palestine Exploration Fund.
- Guérin, V. (1880). Description Géographique Historique et Archéologique de la Palestine (in French). Vol. 3: Galilee, pt. 2. Paris: L'Imprimerie Nationale.
- Hütteroth, W.-D.; Abdulfattah, K. (1977). Historical Geography of Palestine, Transjordan and Southern Syria in the Late 16th Century. Erlanger Geographische Arbeiten, Sonderband 5. Erlangen, Germany: Vorstand der Fränkischen Geographischen Gesellschaft. ISBN 3-920405-41-2.
- Palmer, E.H. (1881). The Survey of Western Palestine: Arabic and English Name Lists Collected During the Survey by Lieutenants Conder and Kitchener, R. E. Transliterated and Explained by E.H. Palmer. Committee of the Palestine Exploration Fund.
- Rhode, H. (1979). Administration and Population of the Sancak of Safed in the Sixteenth Century (PhD). Columbia University. Archived from the original on 2020-03-01.
