= Srobbin =

Village in Nabatieh Governorate, Lebanon

Srobbin صربين
- Municipality
- Location within Lebanon
- Coordinates: 33°9′14″N 35°21′32″E
- Grid position: 183/284 PAL
- Country: Lebanon
- Governorate: Nabatieh Governorate
- District: Bint Jbeil District
- Elevation: 590 m (1,940 ft)
- Time zone: UTC+2 (EET)
  - Summer (DST): UTC+3 (EEST)
- Dialing code: +961

Srobbin, Surubbin, (Levantine Arabic: صربين, romanized: Ṣrobbīn) is a municipality in the Bint Jbeil District in southern Lebanon. The municipality is located in the region of Nabatiye about 27km away from the region's capital Nabatiye and about 83km away from Lebanon's capital Beirut.

== Etymology ==
According to E. H. Palmer, Srobbin comes from a personal name.

== History ==
In 1852, Edward Robinson noted the village (Seribbin) on his travels in the region.

In 1881, the PEF's Survey of Western Palestine (SWP) described it as: "a small stone village, containing about eighty Metawileh, situated on hill-top, with olives and arable cultivation; springs near, and cisterns and birket."

== Demographics ==
In 2014 Muslims made up 99.49% of registered voters in Srobbin. 99.36% of the voters were Shiite Muslims.

== Bibliography ==
- Conder, C.R.; Kitchener, H.H. (1881). The Survey of Western Palestine: Memoirs of the Topography, Orography, Hydrography, and Archaeology. Vol. 1. London: Committee of the Palestine Exploration Fund.
- Palmer, E.H. (1881). The Survey of Western Palestine: Arabic and English Name Lists Collected During the Survey by Lieutenants Conder and Kitchener, R. E. Transliterated and Explained by E.H. Palmer. Committee of the Palestine Exploration Fund.
- Robinson, E.; Smith, E. (1856). Later Biblical Researches in Palestine and adjacent regions: A Journal of Travels in the year 1852. London: John Murray.
