= Kfar Dounin =

Kfar Dounin كفردونين
- Municipality
- Location within Lebanon
- Coordinates: 33°14′N 35°24′E
- Grid position: 187/293 PAL
- Country: Lebanon
- Governorate: Nabatieh Governorate
- District: Bint Jbeil District
- Elevation: 580 m (1,900 ft)
- Time zone: UTC+2 (EET)
  - Summer (DST): UTC+3 (EEST)
- Website: http://www.kfardounine.org/

Kfar Dounin or Kfardounin (Arabic: كفردونين, romanized: Kfardūnīn) is municipality in Lebanon, 102 km from the capital Beirut and 580 m from sea coast remote. Adjacent villages: Deir Kifa, Alkaline, Kherbet Selem, Deir Intar. It is located in the Bent Jbeil district of Nabatieh Governorate. It has a population of 6,000 people.

== History ==
In 1875 Victor Guérin noted: "Near a little mosque are well-cut stones, the remains of a demolished church, of which there also survive fragments of monolithic columns and several broken capitals, strewing the soil in several places, and especially near the Sheikh's house.' He estimated that the village had 350 to 400 Metawileh inhabitants.

In 1881, the PEF's Survey of Western Palestine (SWP) described it as: "A village, built of stone, containing about 150 Metawileh, on a hill, surrounded by figs, olives, and arable land. The water is obtained from a spring near and cisterns in the village."

At the beginning of March 1986 a Ghanaian soldier serving with UNIFIL was shot and injured by an Israeli soldier in Kfar Dounin. The Israelis had launched a search operation, the largest since their withdrawal to their security zone in June 1985, looking for two of their soldiers who had been captured. Two Israelis were killed in the operation.

On 6 January 2026, two residents were killed in an Israeli drone strike.

== Demographics ==
In 2014 Muslims made up 98.91% of registered voters in Kfar Dounin. 95.83% of the voters were Shiite Muslims. The town has a population of about 6,000, though only 1,500 live in the village year round.

== Bibliography ==
- Conder, C.R.; Kitchener, H.H. (1881). The Survey of Western Palestine: Memoirs of the Topography, Orography, Hydrography, and Archaeology. Vol. 1. London: Committee of the Palestine Exploration Fund. (p. 96)
- Guérin, V. (1880). Description Géographique Historique et Archéologique de la Palestine (in French). Vol. 3: Galilee, pt. 2. Paris: L'Imprimerie Nationale.
- Palmer, E.H. (1881). The Survey of Western Palestine: Arabic and English Name Lists Collected During the Survey by Lieutenants Conder and Kitchener, R. E. Transliterated and Explained by E.H. Palmer. Committee of the Palestine Exploration Fund.
