= Al-Jumayjimah =

Al-Jumayjimah الجميجمة
- Municipality
- Location within Lebanon
- Coordinates: 33°12′23″N 35°26′27″E
- Grid position: 191/290 PAL
- Country: Lebanon
- Governorate: Nabatieh
- District: Bint Jbeil
- Elevation: 690 m (2,260 ft)
- Time zone: UTC+2 (EET)
  - Summer (DST): UTC+3 (EEST)
- Dialing code: +961

Al-Jumayjimah (Arabic: الجميجمة, romanized: al-Jumayjimah) is a municipality in the Bint Jbeil District in southern Lebanon, located north-east of Tibnin.

== Etymology ==
According to E. H. Palmer, the name El Jumeijmeh comes from "The little sculls".

== History ==
In 1881, the PEF's Survey of Western Palestine (SWP) described it: "A small village of stone and mud, containing about 100 Metawileh, situated on hill-top, with a few olives and figs around. Water supply from cisterns."

On 29 September 1992, following an attack on a South Lebanon Army outpost in Rachaf, Hizbullah fighters shot their way through a Unifil checkpoint at Al-Jumayjimah. One Irish soldier was killed, bring the total number of Unifil soldiers killed to 187, 33 of them from Ireland.

== Demographics ==
In 2014 Muslims made up 99.75% of registered voters in Al-Jumayjimah. 98.68% of the voters were Shiite Muslims.

== Bibliography ==
- Conder, C.R.; Kitchener, H.H. (1881). The Survey of Western Palestine: Memoirs of the Topography, Orography, Hydrography, and Archaeology. Vol. 1. London: Committee of the Palestine Exploration Fund.
- Palmer, E.H. (1881). The Survey of Western Palestine: Arabic and English Name Lists Collected During the Survey by Lieutenants Conder and Kitchener, R. E. Transliterated and Explained by E.H. Palmer. Committee of the Palestine Exploration Fund.
