= Baraashit =

Baraashit برعشيت
- Municipality
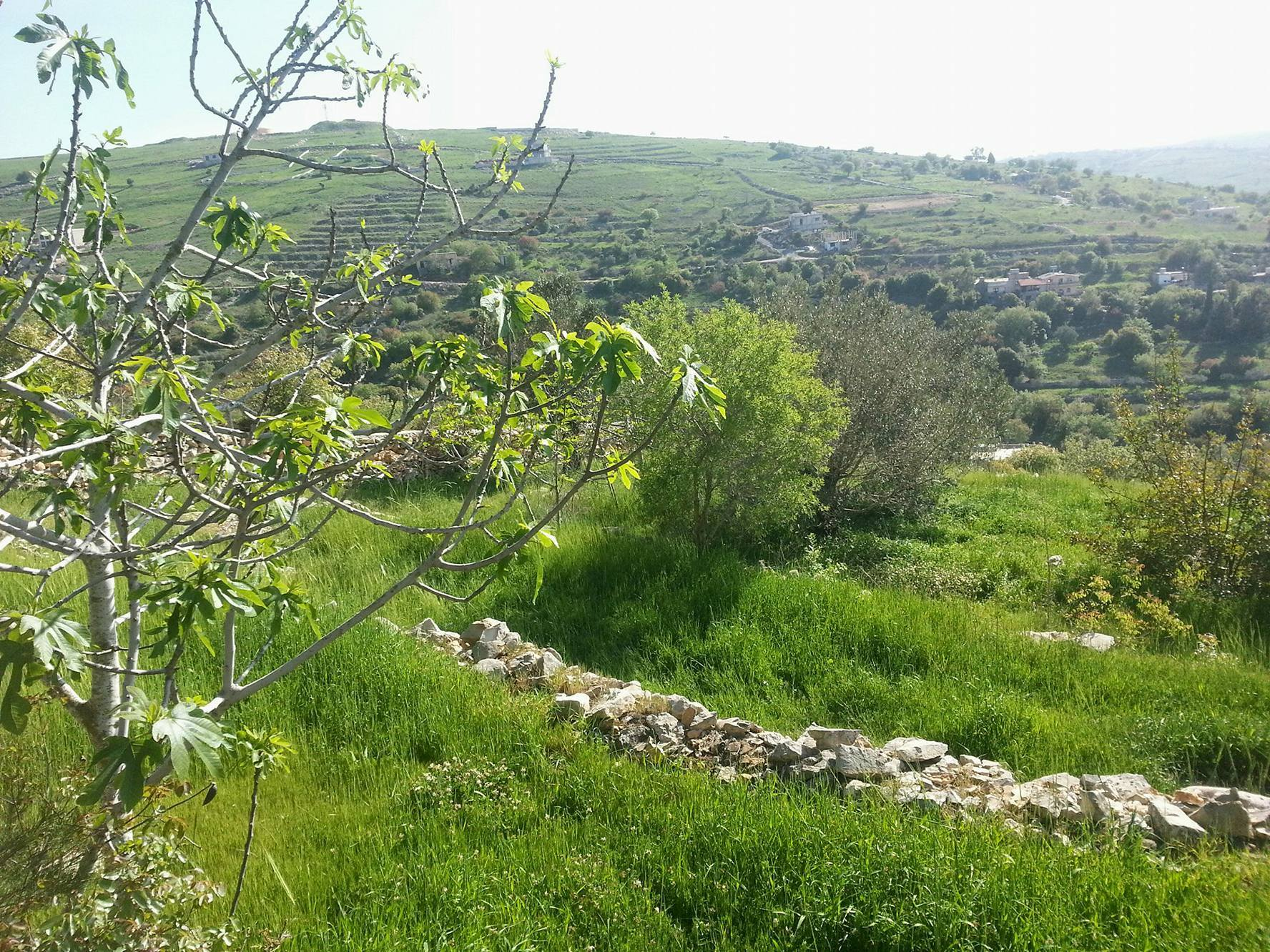
- Pastoral view of Baraashit

- Location within Lebanon
- Coordinates: 33°10′34″N 35°26′36″E
- Grid position: 191/286 PAL
- Country: Lebanon
- Governorate: Nabatieh Governorate
- District: Bint Jbeil District

Area
  - Total: 14.05 km^{2} (5.42 sq mi)
- Elevation: 832 m (2,730 ft)
- Highest elevation: 840 m (2,760 ft)
- Lowest elevation: 640 m (2,100 ft)
- Time zone: UTC+2 (EET)
  - Summer (DST): UTC+3 (EEST)
- Dialing code: +961 (07)

Baraashit (Arabic: برعشيت), also spelt Brashit, is a municipality located in the Nabatiye Governorate, in the Bint Jbeil District of southern Lebanon, ca. 3.5 kilometres (2.2 mi) southeast of Tibnin and about 80 kilometres (50 mi) from Beirut. The village sits on an elevation of 832 metres (2,730 ft) above sea level. The town has a mixed population of Shi'a and Christians.

== History ==
Baraashit is identified with Barashta (Hebrew: ברשתה), a place referenced in the Baraita on the "Boundaries of the Land of Israel" as part of the delineation of the northwestern border of Jewish resettlement following the return from Babylonian exile. Scholarly analysis suggests that this text likely describes a later era, possibly the Hasmonean or Herodian periods, during the 2nd or 1st century BCE. Additionally, the place is documented in the 3rd-century Mosaic of Rehob.

By 64 BCE, the region had come under the control of the Roman Empire. The area was also known since the Muslim conquest as Jabal 'Amilah, and later as Jabal 'Amil (Jabal Amel), an area that shoulders the Galilee and overlooks Land of Israel, with a predominant Shi'ite population.

=== Ottoman era ===
In 1596, the village Bra'sit was named in the Ottoman nahiya (subdistrict) of Tibnin under the Liwa Safad, with a population of 45 households and 7 bachelors, all Muslim. The villagers paid taxes on agricultural products, such as wheat, barley, olive trees, fruit trees, goats and beehives, in addition to "occasional revenues" and a fixed sum; a total of 13,370 akçe.

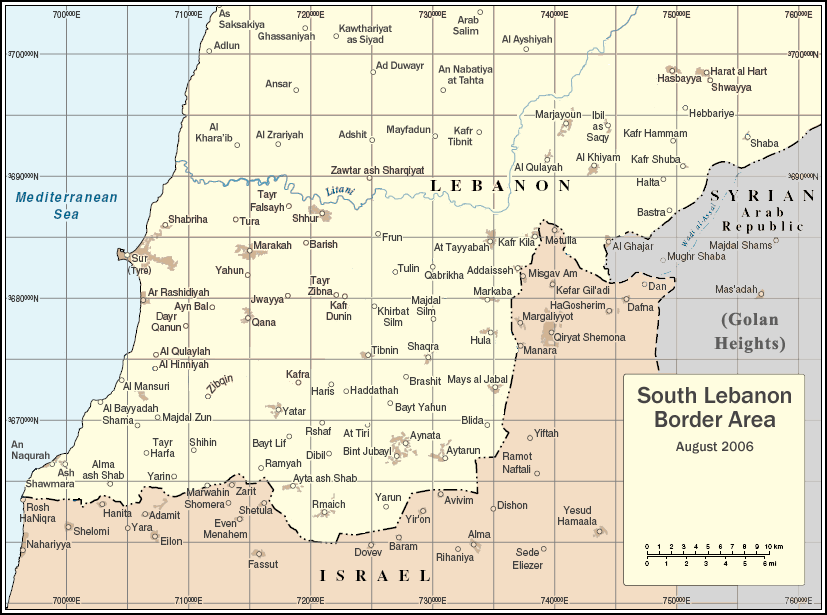
South lebanon map

In 1875, Victor Guérin visited, and found here "a cistern partly cut in the rock, and partly constructed, seems ancient." He found 400 Metawileh and 60 Greek Orthodox.

In 1881, British explorers, C. R. Conder and H. H. Kitchener, surveyed parts of southern Lebanon, mentioning ten villages in the Belad Besharah region, among which is listed Ber'ashit (sic): "A large village, containing about 500 Metawileh and 200 Christians. It is situated on the side of a hill, and surrounded by figs, olives, and arable cultivation. There is a good spring and several cisterns in the village."

=== Modern era ===
The current Bint Jbeil province was created in 1922 by French colonials.

Following the 1982 Israeli invasion of Lebanon, Baraashit remained part of the Israeli security zone and became the scene of recurring incidents. On 10 January 1987 an Irish soldier serving with UNIFIL was killed by Israeli tank fire near Baraashit. At the time there were 750 Irish troops with UNIFIL. A further three Irish soldiers were killed, 21 March 1989, by a landmine on the road to their outpost near Baraashit. Officers on the ground are reported as believing that the Israeli backed SLA were responsible and that UNIFIL were being deliberately targeted. On 11 October 1990 a member of Amal was killed in a clash with the South Lebanon Army (SLA). On 23 August 1991 two SLA fighters were killed by members of Amal. The Israeli Army responded the following day with shelling which killed one civilian. Two Irish soldiers serving with UNIFIL were amongst the wounded.

IDF shelling killed a schoolboy in Baraashit on 24 January 1993.

There was a SLA outpost a few hundred yards from Baraashit and whenever it came under attack the town was shelled. The town was extensively damaged during Operation Accountability, July 1993. The head of one family who had five houses completely destroyed is reported as complaining "How many Ministers from Beirut came down here to see the damage? Rabin visits Kiryat Shimona the minute one Katuysha hits it."

On 8 April 1996 two boys were killed by an IED concealed in a wall near Baraashit, three others wounded. Hezbollah responded by firing twenty-eight rockets at Kiryat Shimona, wounding thirteen residents. The incident is regarded as one of the triggers of Operation Grapes of Wrath later in the month which caused massive destruction across the south of Lebanon.

During the 2006 Lebanon War, Israel conducted an airstrike at the town. Later it was discovered that one of the homes struck was rented by Hezbollah, who used its basement to store weapons. When rumors of this activity spread, the organization acknowledged its actions and offered compensation to the family.

== Demographics ==
In 2014 Muslims made up 93.40% and Christians made up 6.32% of registered voters in Baraashit. 92.19% of the voters were Shiite Muslims. The Christian population is mostly Greek Catholic.

In 2009, there were 55 members of the Lady of the Assumption parish of the Melkite Church in the village.

== Climate ==
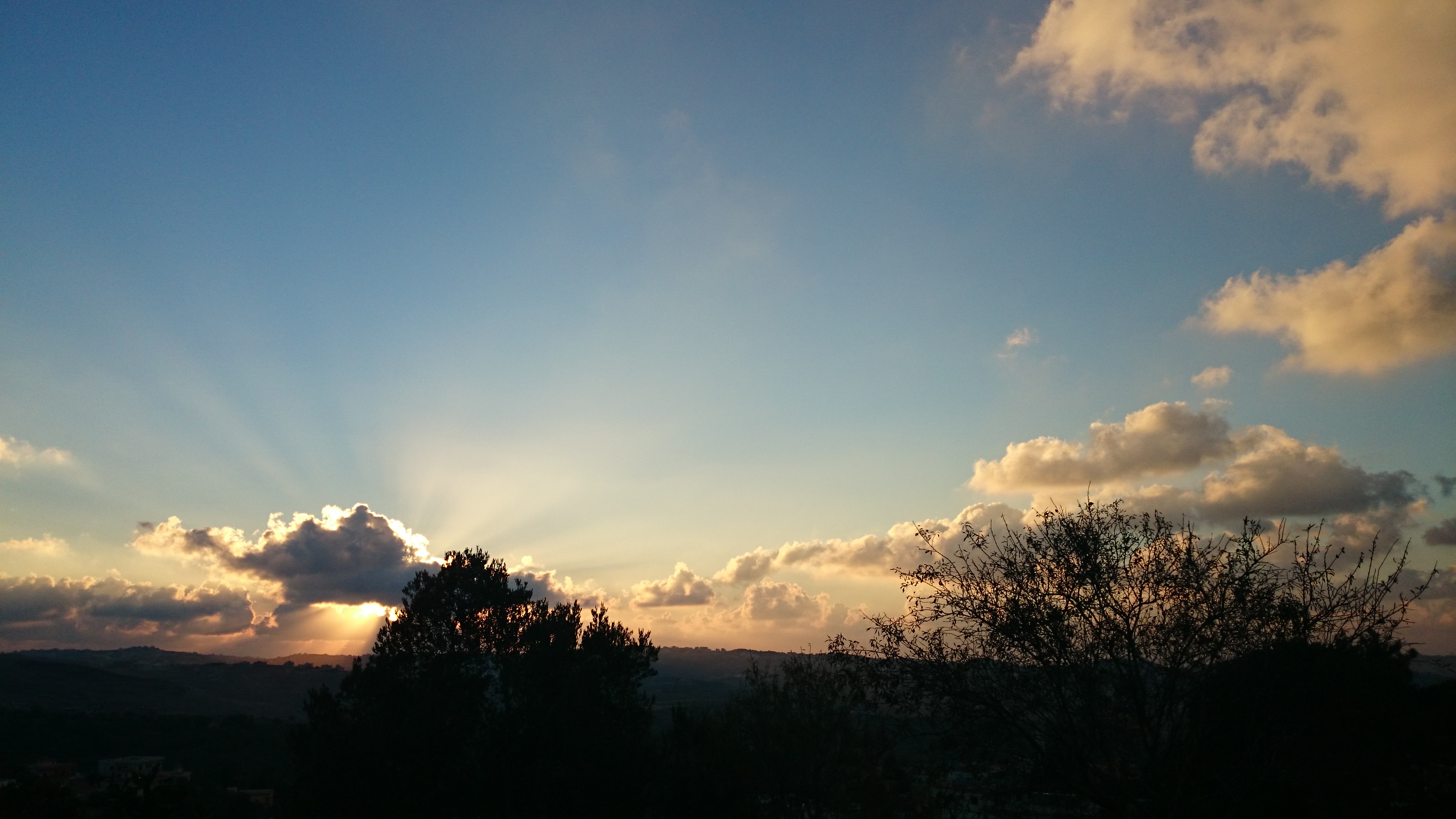
Baraashit

Baraashit enjoys a temperate climate which is characteristic of south Lebanon: Mild rainy winters and arid summers with a few excessively warm days.

== Bibliography ==
- Abel, F.M. (1933). Géographie de la Palestine (in French). Vol. 1. Paris. OCLC 216266367.
- Conder, C.R.; Kitchener, H.H. (1881). The Survey of Western Palestine: Memoirs of the Topography, Orography, Hydrography, and Archaeology. Vol. 1. London: Committee of the Palestine Exploration Fund.
- Frankel, Raphael; Finkelstein, I. (1983). "'The Northwest Corner of Eretz-Israel' in the Baraita 'Boundaries of Eretz-Israel'". Cathedra: For the History of Eretz Israel and Its Yishuv. 27 (27): 39–46. JSTOR 23398920.
- Guérin, V. (1880). Description Géographique Historique et Archéologique de la Palestine (in French). Vol. 3: Galilee, pt. 2. Paris: L'Imprimerie Nationale.
- Hütteroth, W.-D.; Abdulfattah, K. (1977). Historical Geography of Palestine, Transjordan and Southern Syria in the Late 16th Century. Erlanger Geographische Arbeiten, Sonderband 5. Erlangen, Germany: Vorstand der Fränkischen Geographischen Gesellschaft. ISBN 3-920405-41-2.
- Klein, S.; Hildesheimer, N.Z. (1965). The Borders of the Land - Researches (in Hebrew). Jerusalem: Otzar hahochma. OCLC 868690016. (published post-mortem)
- Palmer, E.H. (1881). The Survey of Western Palestine: Arabic and English Name Lists Collected During the Survey by Lieutenants Conder and Kitchener, R. E. Transliterated and Explained by E.H. Palmer. Committee of the Palestine Exploration Fund.
- Rhode, H. (1979). Administration and Population of the Sancak of Safed in the Sixteenth Century. Columbia University. Archived from the original on 2019-04-20.
