= Haddatha =

Village in Nabatieh Governorate, Lebanon

Haddatha حدّاثا
- Municipality
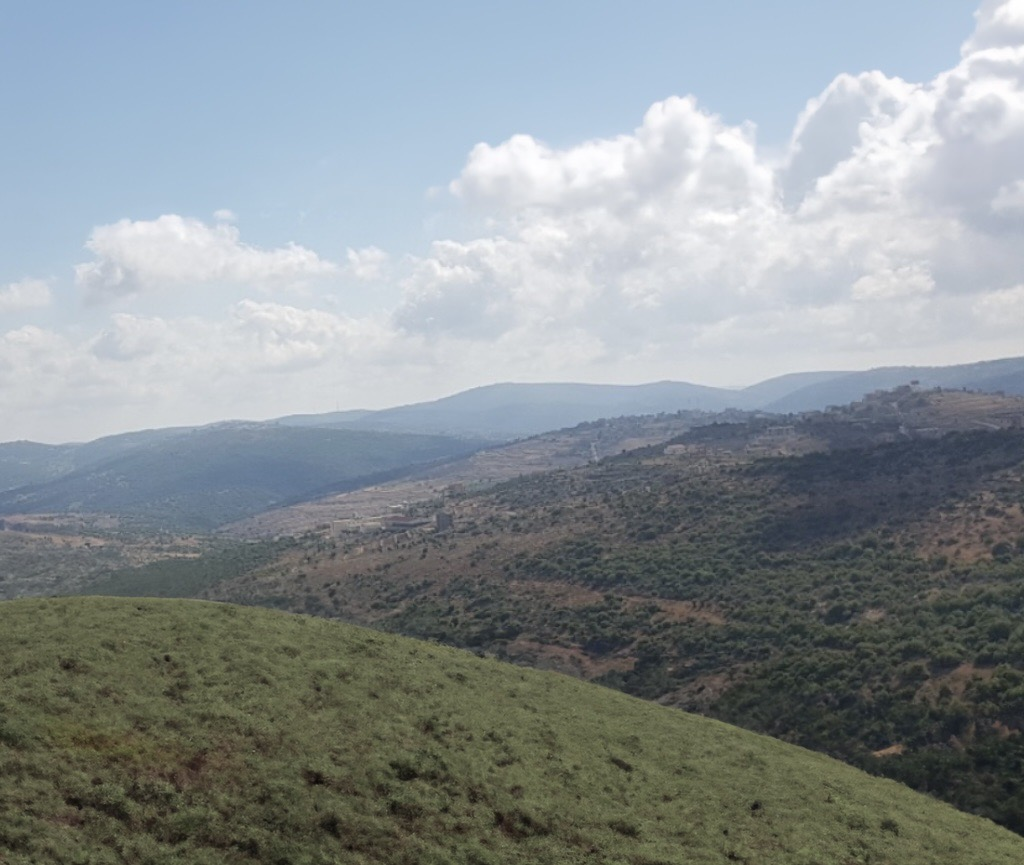
- Hills to the south of Haddatha

- Location within Lebanon
- Coordinates: 33°10′N 35°23′E
- Grid position: 186/285 PAL
- Country: Lebanon
- Governorate: Nabatieh Governorate
- District: Bint Jbeil District
- Elevation: 760 m (2,490 ft)
- Time zone: UTC+2 (EET)
  - Summer (DST): UTC+3 (EEST)

Haddatha (Arabic: حدّاثا Haddatha) is a municipality in Bint Jbeil District in the Nabatieh Governorate of Southern Lebanon.

== History ==
In 1596, it was named as a village, ‘“Hadata” in the Ottoman nahiya (subdistrict) of Tibnin under the liwa' (district) of Safad, with a population of 52 households, all Muslim. The villagers paid a fixed tax-rate of 25% on agricultural products, such as wheat, barley, fruit trees, goats and beehives, in addition to "occasional revenues”; a total of 4,640 akçe.

In 1838, Edward Robinson noted the village on his travels in the region.

In 1875, Victor Guérin found the population to be exclusively Metualis. In 1881, the PEF's Survey of Western Palestine (SWP) described Haddatha: "A village, built of stone, containing about 150 Metawileh, on hill-top; a few grapes, figs and olives, and arable cultivation; there is a spring near and cisterns in village; a birket for cattle."

Following the 1982 invasion, Haddatha became part of the Israeli security zone. On 24 February 1989, an Irish soldier was shot dead by members of the Israeli backed SLA. At the time there were 600 Irish soldiers serving with UNIFIL.

During the 2006 Lebanon War, the Israeli Army shelled a house with 6 civilians, killing all of them. They were aged from 50 to 80 years old.

A wildfire in July 2019 burned a significant number of trees.

== Geography ==
Haddatha is situated on a hill. Its area is about 9 km².

== Demographics ==
In 2014 Muslims made up 99.23% of registered voters in Haddatha. 98.11% of the voters were Shiite Muslims.

== Life in the village ==
The village suffers from inadequate urban planning. Most internal roads in Haddatha lack proper infrastructure, paving, and afforestation. Although there is a football stadium, it is old and requires renovation and redesign.

== Notable people ==
- Husayn Muruwwa

== Bibliography ==
- Conder, C.R.; Kitchener, H.H. (1881). The Survey of Western Palestine: Memoirs of the Topography, Orography, Hydrography, and Archaeology. Vol. 1. London: Committee of the Palestine Exploration Fund.
- Guérin, V. (1880). Description Géographique Historique et Archéologique de la Palestine (in French). Vol. 3: Galilee, pt. 2. Paris: L'Imprimerie Nationale.
- HRW (2007). Why They Died: Civilian Casualties in Lebanon During the 2006 War. Human Rights Watch.
- Hütteroth, W.-D.; Abdulfattah, K. (1977). Historical Geography of Palestine, Transjordan and Southern Syria in the Late 16th Century. Erlanger Geographische Arbeiten, Sonderband 5. Erlangen, Germany: Vorstand der Fränkischen Geographischen Gesellschaft. ISBN 3-920405-41-2.
- Palmer, E.H. (1881). The Survey of Western Palestine: Arabic and English Name Lists Collected During the Survey by Lieutenants Conder and Kitchener, R. E. Transliterated and Explained by E.H. Palmer. Committee of the Palestine Exploration Fund.
- Rhode, H. (1979). Administration and Population of the Sancak of Safed in the Sixteenth Century. Columbia University. Archived from the original on 2019-04-20.
- Robinson, E.; Smith, E. (1841). Biblical Researches in Palestine, Mount Sinai and Arabia Petraea: A Journal of Travels in the year 1838. Vol. 3. Boston: Crocker & Brewster.
