= Kafra, Bint Jbeil =

City in Nabatieh Governorate, Lebanon

Kafra كفرا
- Municipality
- Location within Lebanon
- Coordinates: 33°10′33″N 35°21′05″E
- Grid position: 183/286 PAL
- Country: Lebanon
- Governorate: Nabatieh Governorate
- District: Bint Jbeil District

Area
  - Total: 10.69 km^{2} (4.13 sq mi)
- Elevation: 720 m (2,360 ft)
- Time zone: UTC+2 (EET)
  - Summer (DST): UTC+3 (EEST)

Kafra (Arabic: كفرا), is a municipality in Nabatiye Governorate, in the Bint Jbeil District of southern Lebanon, about 85 kilometres (53 mi) from Beirut. The village is located in the south-western outskirts of the town of Tebnine, in the heart of the Lebanese Shia Muslim community of Jabal Amel. The village sits on an elevation of 720 metres (2,360 ft) above sea level.

== History ==
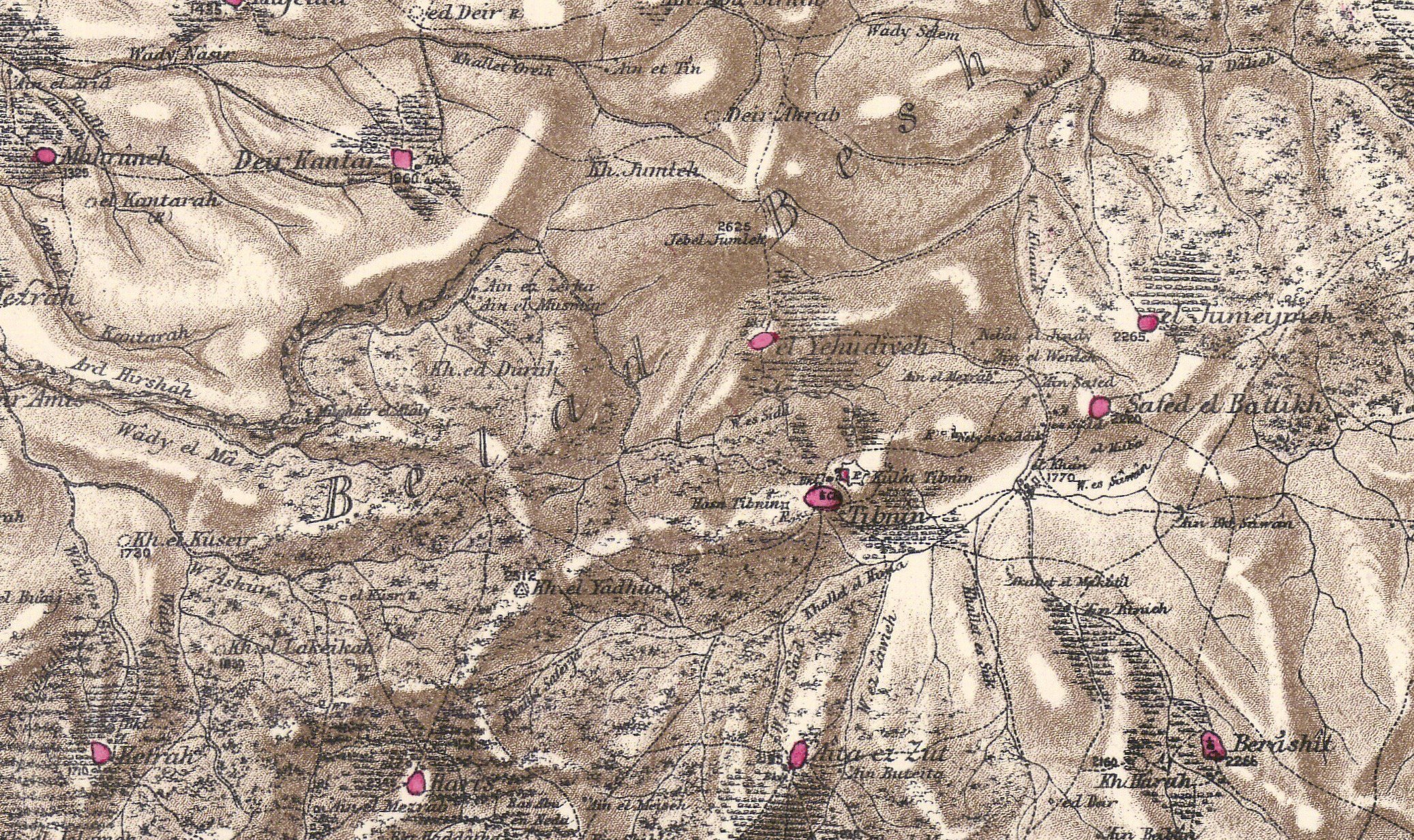
Kafra shown amongst the villages surrounding Tebnine in the 1880s PEF Survey of Palestine.

In the 1596 Ottoman tax records, the village, named Kfür Tıbnin was located in the Ottoman nahiya (subdistrict) of Tibnin under the liwa' (district) of Safad, with a population of 51 households and 12 bachelors, all Muslim. The villagers paid a fixed tax-rate of 25% on agricultural products, such as wheat (4,290 akçe), barley (490 akçe), vineyards and fruit trees (1,560 akçe), goats and beehives (530 akçe), in addition to "occasional revenues" (300 akçe); a total of 7,170 akçe.

In 1856 it was named Kefra on Kiepert's map of Palestine/Lebanon published that year, while in 1875, Victor Guérin visited and noted: “'Here are broken columns, tombs, presses, cisterns, and a great reservoir cut in the rock. Another tank is partly cut in the rock, and partly constructed with regular stones." Guérin further described how he reached the village, after climbing through "many terraces, where centuries-old olive trees grow", and that the village had succeeded an ancient site.

In 1881, the Palestine Exploration Fund's Survey of Western Palestine (SWP) described the village (which it called Kefrah): "A village, built of stone, containing about 200 Metawileh, situated on hill-top, with olives and arable ground around. There is a large spring and masonry birket (pool) at the village."

The current Bint Jbeil province was created in 1922 by French colonials.

On 20 February 1992 the Israeli Army occupied Kafra and neighbouring Yater in a 24 hour incursion, backed by tanks, helicopters and heavy artillery. Around 100 buildings were destroyed including a mosque and a school. 2 Israeli soldiers were killed in the raid and a young girl was killed in northern Israel by a subsequent rocket attack.

On 5 August 1997 an Israeli special commando unit killed two Hizbollah commanders in Kafra. Three civilians were also killed.

During the 2006 Lebanon War, 3 civilians were killed and 14 wounded by Israeli air strikes as they were trying to flee the war. The killed were between their mid-forties and 70 years of age. No military activity was observed in the area before the attack.

== Demographics ==
In 2014 Muslims made up 99.64% of registered voters in Kafra. 98.85% of the voters were Shiite Muslims.

== Bibliography ==
- Conder, C.R.; Kitchener, H.H. (1881). The Survey of Western Palestine: Memoirs of the Topography, Orography, Hydrography, and Archaeology. Vol. 1. London: Committee of the Palestine Exploration Fund.
- Guérin, V. (1880). Description Géographique Historique et Archéologique de la Palestine (in French). Vol. 3: Galilee, pt. 2. Paris: L'Imprimerie Nationale.
- Hütteroth, W.-D.; Abdulfattah, K. (1977). Historical Geography of Palestine, Transjordan and Southern Syria in the Late 16th Century. Erlanger Geographische Arbeiten, Sonderband 5. Erlangen, Germany: Vorstand der Fränkischen Geographischen Gesellschaft. ISBN 3-920405-41-2.
- Palmer, E.H. (1881). The Survey of Western Palestine: Arabic and English Name Lists Collected During the Survey by Lieutenants Conder and Kitchener, R. E. Transliterated and Explained by E.H. Palmer. Committee of the Palestine Exploration Fund.
- Rhode, H. (1979). Administration and Population of the Sancak of Safed in the Sixteenth Century (PhD). Columbia University. Archived from the original on 2016-10-10.
