= Beit Yahoun =

Beit Yahoun بيت ياحون
- Municipality
- Location within Lebanon
- Coordinates: 33°09′33″N 35°25′18″E
- Grid position: 189/284 PAL
- Country: Lebanon
- Governorate: Nabatieh Governorate
- District: Bint Jbeil District
- Elevation: 950 m (3,120 ft)
- Time zone: UTC+2 (EET)

Beit Yahoun (Arabic: بيت ياحون, romanized: Bayt Yāḥūn) is a municipality in Lebanon located near Bint Jbeil, in the Nabatiye Governorate. Beit Yahoun is 117 km from Beirut. It is 950 meters above sea level and covers an area of 485 hectares.

== History ==
Visiting in 1875, Victor Guérin described it as a village with 150 Metualis (Shia Muslims).

In 1881, the PEF's Survey of Western Palestine (SWP) described it: "A village, built of stone, containing about fifty Metawileh, situated on hill-top, with grapes and figs. There are no springs, but a birket and cisterns for water supply.”

Following the 1982 invasion Beit Yahoun became part of the Israeli security zone. On 4 October 1992 Hizbullah launched an attack on the South Lebanon Army’s checkpoint in the village. Two senior SLA officers were killed, one of them believed to be responsible for the 8 November 1991 bombing of the American University of Beirut. On 21 June 1997 six Irish soldiers serving with UNIFIL were wounded, one seriously, whilst clearing mines on the road to Beit Yahoun. The IDF had laid the mines to protect a nearby SLA position which had resulted in the Irish having to use helicopters to reach their UNIFIL post. After lengthy negotiations the Israelis partially cleared the road. The Irish casualties occurred while they were clearing the remaining mines.

On 15 May 1999 Hizbullah launched coordinated attacks on three SLA positions. The offensive was preceded by mortar and missile attacks on fourteen IDF and SLA compounds. The Bayt Yahoun outpost was overrun, its SLA commander killed and one of his soldiers taken prisoner. An APC was captured and later paraded in Beirut. Video footage of the attack was shown on Lebanese television.

== Demographics ==
In 2014 Muslims made up 99.60% of registered voters in Beit Yahoun. 97.86% of the voters were Shiite Muslims.

== Bibliography ==
- Conder, C.R.; Kitchener, H.H. (1881). The Survey of Western Palestine: Memoirs of the Topography, Orography, Hydrography, and Archaeology. Vol. 1. London: Committee of the Palestine Exploration Fund.
- Guérin, V. (1880). Description Géographique Historique et Archéologique de la Palestine (in French). Vol. 3: Galilee, pt. 2. Paris: L'Imprimerie Nationale.
- Palmer, E.H. (1881). The Survey of Western Palestine: Arabic and English Name Lists Collected During the Survey by Lieutenants Conder and Kitchener, R. E. Transliterated and Explained by E.H. Palmer. Committee of the Palestine Exploration Fund.
