= Kounin =

Kounin كونين
- Municipality
- Location within Lebanon
- Coordinates: 33°08′56″N 35°26′17″E
- Grid position: 191/283 PAL
- Country: Lebanon
- Governorate: Nabatieh Governorate
- District: Bint Jbeil District
- Elevation: 710 m (2,330 ft)
- Time zone: UTC+2 (EET)
  - Summer (DST): UTC+3 (EEST)

Kounin (Arabic: كونين, romanized: Kūnīn) is a municipality in Lebanon located in Bint Jbeil District, south-east of Tibnin.

== Etymology ==
E. H. Palmer wrote that the name Kounin came from a personal name.

== History ==
In 1875, Victor Guérin gives the population of this place at 400, divided between Moslems and Metawileh.

In 1881, the PEF's Survey of Western Palestine (SWP) described it as: "A village, built of stone, containing about 200 Metawileh; it is situated on ridge, with olives and arable land around; water from cisterns in the village and from a large birket." They further noted: "There are two round and two octagonal pillars at this village, remains of old materials, and a lintel measuring 17' long and bearing a Greek inscription. There are also several cisterns and a large birkeh. The inscription on the lintel is probably the common formula, KYPIE BOHΘH ("Help, Lord")."

In March 2024, senior Hezbollah commander in the elite Redwan force, Ismail al-Zin, was killed by an Israeli drone strike in Kounin.

== Demographics ==
In 2014 Muslims made up 99.60% of registered voters in Kounin. 97.67% of the voters were Shiite Muslims.

== Bibliography ==
- Conder, C.R.; Kitchener, H.H. (1881). The Survey of Western Palestine: Memoirs of the Topography, Orography, Hydrography, and Archaeology. Vol. 1. London: Committee of the Palestine Exploration Fund.
- Guérin, V. (1880). Description Géographique Historique et Archéologique de la Palestine (in French). Vol. 3: Galilee, pt. 2. Paris: L'Imprimerie Nationale.
- Palmer, E.H. (1881). The Survey of Western Palestine: Arabic and English Name Lists Collected During the Survey by Lieutenants Conder and Kitchener, R. E. Transliterated and Explained by E.H. Palmer. Committee of the Palestine Exploration Fund.
