= Beit Lif =

Beit Lif بيت ليف
- Municipality
- Location within Lebanon
- Coordinates: 33°8′1″N 35°19′58″E
- Grid position: 181/282 PAL
- Country: Lebanon
- Governorate: Nabatieh Governorate
- District: Bint Jbeil District
- Elevation: 530 m (1,740 ft)
- Time zone: UTC+2 (EET)
  - Summer (DST): UTC+3 (EEST)
- Dialing code: +961(7)

Beit Lif (Arabic: بيت ليف, romanized: Bayt Līf) is a municipality in the Bint Jbeil District in southern Lebanon.

== Etymology ==
According to E. H. Palmer, the name means "the house of lif" (palm-fibre).

== History ==
In 1852, Edward Robinson noted that the year before, a quantity of gold coin were found at Beit Lif, which was taken to Beirut and given to the Pasha. He further noted that the people were planting millet and tobacco.

In 1875, Victor Guérin found here a village with 80 Metuali inhabitants.

In 1881, the PEF's Survey of Western Palestine (SWP) described it as: "A village, built of stone, containing about 150 Moslems [..] situated on a hill-top, with a few olives and arable land. Two cisterns and a birket near supply the water."

On 23 November 1997 a South Lebanon Army compound on the edge of the village came under artillery fire. Eight civilians were killed. Amal was believed to be responsible for the shelling.

== Demographics ==
In 2014 Muslims made up 99.80% of registered voters in Beit Lif. 97.74% of the voters were Shiite Muslims.

== Bibliography ==
- Conder, C.R.; Kitchener, H.H. (1881). The Survey of Western Palestine: Memoirs of the Topography, Orography, Hydrography, and Archaeology. Vol. 1. London: Committee of the Palestine Exploration Fund.
- Guérin, V. (1880). Description Géographique Historique et Archéologique de la Palestine (in French). Vol. 3: Galilee, pt. 2. Paris: L'Imprimerie Nationale.
- Palmer, E. H. (1881). The Survey of Western Palestine: Arabic and English Name Lists Collected During the Survey by Lieutenants Conder and Kitchener, R. E. Transliterated and Explained by E.H. Palmer. Committee of the Palestine Exploration Fund.
- Robinson, E.; Smith, E. (1856). Later Biblical Researches in Palestine and adjacent regions: A Journal of Travels in the year 1852. London: John Murray.
