= Hanin, Lebanon =

Hanin حانين
- Municipality
- Location within Lebanon
- Coordinates: 33°6′34″N 35°22′50″E
- Grid position: 186/279 PAL
- Country: Lebanon
- Governorate: Nabatieh Governorate
- District: Bint Jbeil District
- Elevation: 670 m (2,200 ft)
- Time zone: UTC+2 (EET)
  - Summer (DST): UTC+3 (EEST)

Hanin (Arabic: حانين, romanized: Ḥānīn) is a municipality in Lebanon located in the Bint Jbeil District.

== Etymology ==
E. H. Palmer wrote that the name Hanin came from a personal name. However, the name has Semitic-Arabic roots, which means "Mercy".

== History ==
In 1875, Victor Guérin found the village to have 250 Metuali inhabitants.

In 1881, the PEF's Survey of Western Palestine (SWP) described it as: "A small village, built of stone; 100 Moslems; on end of rocky ridge, with vineyards and arable land; water from 'Ain Hanin in the valley below."

They further noted: "This is evidently an ancient site; the rock to the south of the village is cut into cisterns; tombs with side and end on kokim loculi; sarcophagi or tombs covered with flat lid on the surface; birkets for holding rainwater; olive-presses and wine-presses in considerable numbers, all cut in the rock. There is no ancient masonry in the village, except at the mouth of an enormous cistern, where the round arches that support the wheel for drawing up the water may be ancient. A little down the hill on the south-east there are some sarcophagi cut out of the rock on pedestals; steps lead up on the west side to one of them; there are grooves for the lids to fit into, but these are in all cases wanting; they had probably a ridge and knobs at the four corners, as frequently observed elsewhere."

== Demographics ==
In 2014 Muslims made up 99.32% of registered voters in Hanin. 97.83% of the voters were Shiite Muslims.

== Bibliography ==
- Conder, C.R.; Kitchener, H. H. (1881). The Survey of Western Palestine: Memoirs of the Topography, Orography, Hydrography, and Archaeology. Vol. 1. London: Committee of the Palestine Exploration Fund.
- Guérin, V. (1880). Description Géographique Historique et Archéologique de la Palestine (in French). Vol. 3: Galilee, pt. 2. Paris: L'Imprimerie Nationale.
- Palmer, E.H. (1881). The Survey of Western Palestine: Arabic and English Name Lists Collected During the Survey by Lieutenants Conder and Kitchener, R. E. Transliterated and Explained by E.H. Palmer. Committee of the Palestine Exploration Fund.
