= Froun =

Froun فرون
- Municipality
- Location within Lebanon
- Coordinates: 33°17′49″N 35°25′43″E
- Grid position: 121/151 L
- Country: Lebanon
- Governorate: Nabatieh
- District: Bint Jbeil
- Elevation: 720 m (2,360 ft)
- Time zone: UTC+2 (EET)
  - Summer (DST): UTC+3 (EEST)
- Dialing code: +961

Froun (Arabic: فرون, romanized: Frūn) is a municipality in the Bint Jbeil District in southern Lebanon.

== Etymology ==
According to E. H. Palmer, the name Furûn comes from "the ovens" or "reservoirs".

== History ==
In 1881, the PEF's Survey of Western Palestine (SWP) described it: "A village, built of stone, containing 100 Metawileh, situated on a hill and surrounded by small gardens and arable land. The water is supplied from rock-cut cisterns."

== Demographics ==
In 2014 Muslims made up 99.89% of registered voters in Froun. 98.32% of the voters were Shiite Muslims.

== Bibliography ==
- Conder, C.R.; Kitchener, H.H. (1881). The Survey of Western Palestine: Memoirs of the Topography, Orography, Hydrography, and Archaeology. Vol. 1. London: Committee of the Palestine Exploration Fund.
- Palmer, E.H. (1881). The Survey of Western Palestine: Arabic and English Name Lists Collected During the Survey by Lieutenants Conder and Kitchener, R. E. Transliterated and Explained by E.H. Palmer. Committee of the Palestine Exploration Fund.
