= Haris, Lebanon =

Village in Nabatieh Governorate, Lebanon

Haris حاريص
- Municipality
- Location within Lebanon
- Coordinates: 33°10′28″N 35°22′36″E
- Grid position: 185/286 PAL
- Country: Lebanon
- Governorate: Nabatieh Governorate
- Elevation: 720 m (2,360 ft)
- Time zone: UTC+2 (EET)
  - Summer (DST): UTC+3 (EEST)
- Dialing code: +961

Haris (Arabic: حاريص) is a municipality, in the region of South Lebanon.

== Etymology ==
According to E. H. Palmer, the name means "guarded".

== History ==
'Here there appear to be no vestiges of ancient constructions, except a circular cistern cut in the rock. Guérin suggests that it may be the site of the ancient Harosheth.' (Judges 4:2). "This identification is strengthened by the fact that the same word which occurs in the name Kir Haroseth, the modern Kerak, exists in the present local dialect in Moab, under the same form, Harith or Haris."

=== Ottoman era ===
In the 1596 tax record, it was named as a village, Haris, in the Ottoman nahiya (subdistrict) of Tebnin under the liwa' (district) of Safad, with a population of 102 households and 8 bachelor, all Muslim. The villagers paid a fixed tax rate of 25% on agricultural products, such as wheat, barley, olive trees, vegetable and fruit garden, orchard, goats and beehives, in addition to "occasional revenues" and a press for olive oil or grape syrup; a total of 3,124 akçe.

In 1852, Edward Robinson noted the village on his travels in the region. In 1875, Victor Guérin found the village to contain 200 Metawileh.

In 1881, the PEF's Survey of Western Palestine (SWP) described it: "A village, built of stone, containing about 100 [..] Metawileh, situated on hill-top, with vineyards, figs, and arable cultivation. There is a birket and many cisterns at the village, and a spring near."

=== Modern era ===
On 24 July 2006, during the 2006 Lebanon-Israel war, Israeli warplanes killed 12 people in the village, in two different strikes. The first strike killed 4 Hezbollah fighters, while the second strike demolished a house 100 meters away, killing 8 civilians, aged between 16 and 77 years.

In November 2006, Italian UNIFIL soldiers were accused of theft in a military store in this village.

== Demographics ==
In 2014 Muslims made up 99.39% of registered voters in Haris. 98.94% of the voters were Shiite Muslims.

== Bibliography ==
- Conder, C.R.; Kitchener, H.H. (1881). The Survey of Western Palestine: Memoirs of the Topography, Orography, Hydrography, and Archaeology. Vol. 1. London: Committee of the Palestine Exploration Fund.
- Guérin, V. (1880). Description Géographique Historique et Archéologique de la Palestine (in French). Vol. 3: Galilee, pt. 2. Paris: L'Imprimerie Nationale.
- HRW (2007). Why They Died: Civilian Casualties in Lebanon During the 2006 War. Human Rights Watch.
- Hütteroth, W.-D.; Abdulfattah, K. (1977). Historical Geography of Palestine, Transjordan and Southern Syria in the Late 16th Century. Erlanger Geographische Arbeiten, Sonderband 5. Erlangen, Germany: Vorstand der Fränkischen Geographischen Gesellschaft. ISBN 3-920405-41-2.
- Palmer, E.H. (1881). The Survey of Western Palestine: Arabic and English Name Lists Collected During the Survey by Lieutenants Conder and Kitchener, R. E. Transliterated and Explained by E.H. Palmer. Committee of the Palestine Exploration Fund.
- Rhode, H. (1979). Administration and Population of the Sancak of Safed in the Sixteenth Century. Columbia University. Archived from the original on 2016-10-10.
- Robinson, E.; Smith, E. (1856). Later Biblical Researches in Palestine and adjacent regions: A Journal of Travels in the year 1852. London: John Murray.
