= As-Sultaniyah =

As-Sultaniyah السلطانية
- Municipality
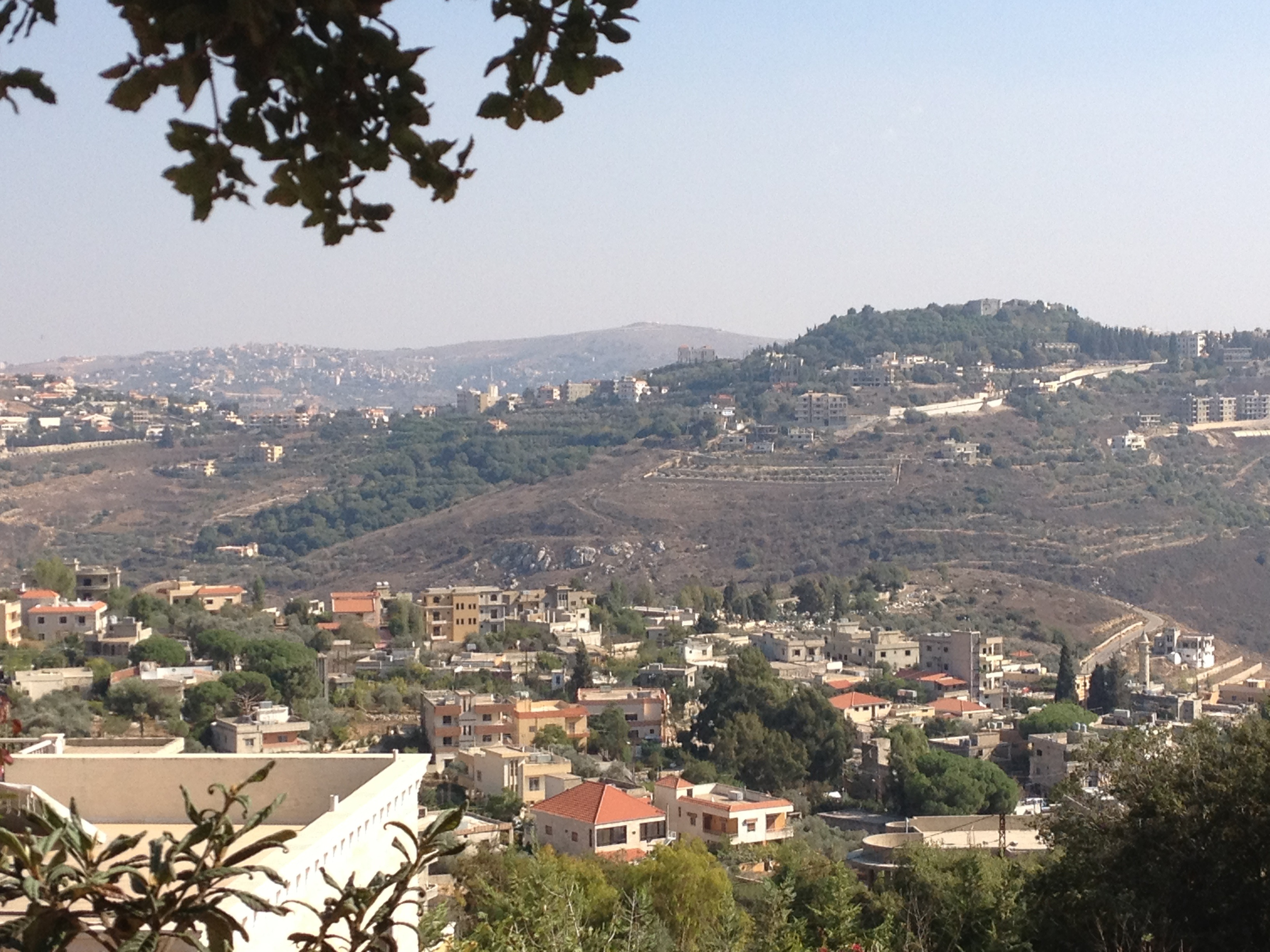
- As-Sultaniyah

- Location within Lebanon
- Coordinates: 33°12′18″N 35°24′19″E
- Grid position: 188/290 PAL
- Country: Lebanon
- Governorate: Nabatieh Governorate
- District: Bint Jbeil District
- Elevation: 600 m (2,000 ft)
- Time zone: UTC+2 (EET)
  - Summer (DST): UTC+3 (EEST)

As-Sultaniyah (Arabic: السلطانية, romanized: as-Sulṭāniyah) is a municipality in the Bint Jbeil District, in southern Lebanon, located just north of Tibnin. It was earlier called el Yehudiyeh.

== Etymology ==
According to E. H. Palmer in 1881, El Yehûdîyeh meant "the Jews" or "Jewish woman."

== History ==
In 1881, the PEF's Survey of Western Palestine (SWP) described it as: "A small village, containing about 100 Metawileh, situated in a valley, with olives, figs, and arable land. There is a spring and cisterns at the village." They further noted that south of the village was a perennial spring, built up with masonry.

In April 2024, Ali Ahmed Hassin, a senior commander of Hezbollah's elite Redwan Force, was assassinated in Israeli air strike in the village.

== Demographics ==
In 2014 Muslims made up 99.04% of registered voters in As-Sultaniyah. 97.45% of the voters were Shiite Muslims. It has a year-round population of about 2,000, but during the summer months it rises to 5,000 as expatriates and locals living in Beirut returns.

== Bibliography ==
- Conder, C.R; Kitchener, H.H. (1881). The Survey of Western Palestine: Memoirs of the Topography, Orography, Hydrography, and Archaeology. Vol. 1. London: Committee of the Palestine Exploration Fund.
- Palmer, E.H. (1881). The Survey of Western Palestine: Arabic and English Name Lists Collected During the Survey by Lieutenants Conder and Kitchener, R. E. Transliterated and Explained by E.H. Palmer. Committee of the Palestine Exploration Fund.
