= Harold Rhode =

American specialist on the Middle East

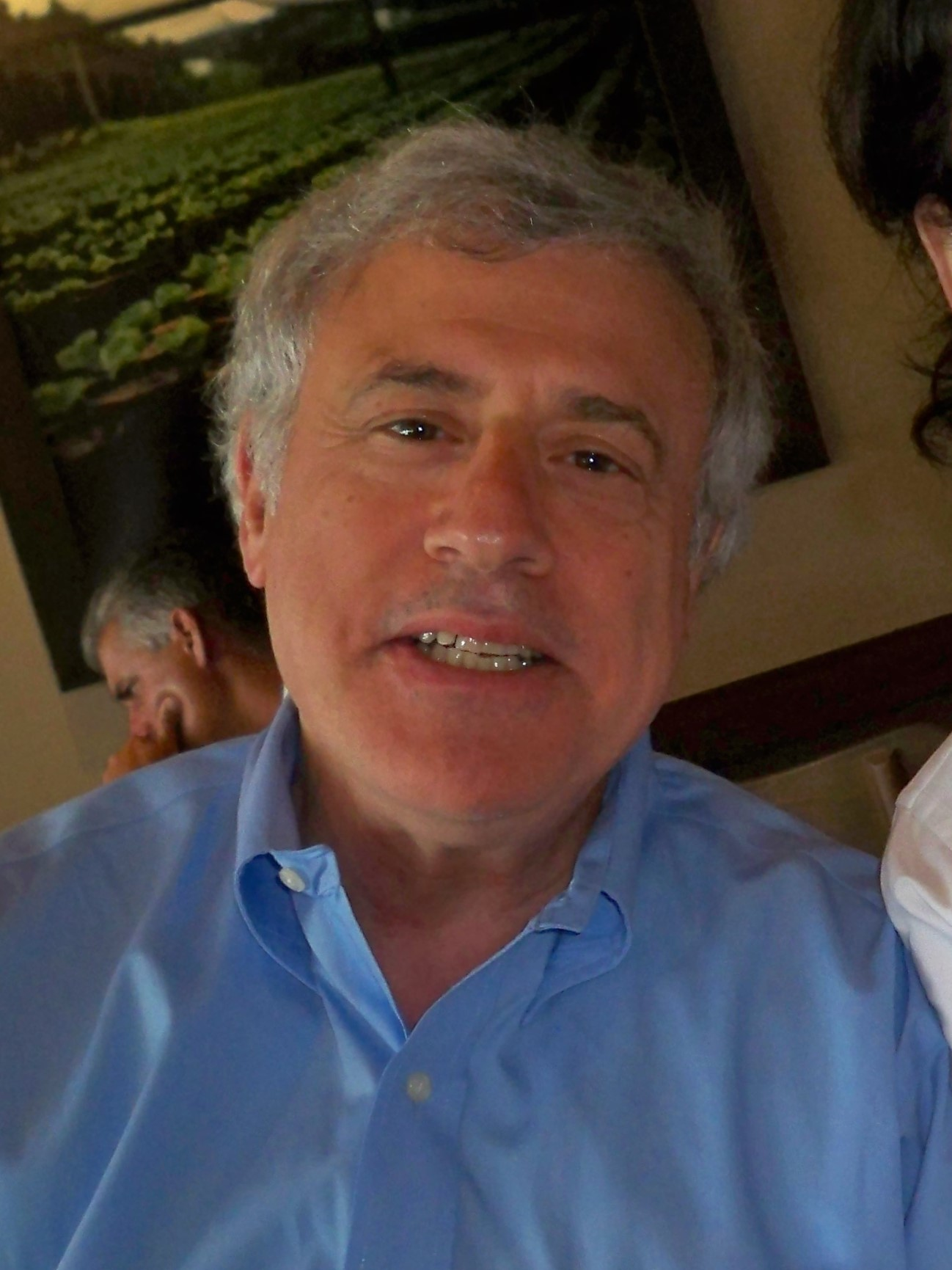

Advisor on Islamic Affairs in the Office of the Secretary of Defense
- In office May 1982 – January 2010

Personal details
- Born: September 19, 1949 (age 77) Philadelphia
- Education: Temple University (B.A.); Columbia University (M.A.); Columbia University (M.Phil.); Columbia University (PhD)

Harold Rhode (born September 19, 1949) is an American specialist on the Middle East. Harold Rhode studied in and traveled extensively throughout the Islamic world and has studied and done research in universities and libraries in Egypt, Israel, Syria, Jordan, Iran, Afghanistan, Turkey, Uzbekistan, and Kazakhstan. He speaks Arabic, Hebrew, Persian, French, and Turkish.

== Early life and education ==
Harold Rhode was born on September 19, 1949, in Philadelphia. He received his Ph.D. from Columbia University in Islamic History, specializing in the history of the Turks, Arabs, and Iranians. Rhode was studying at Ferdosi University in Iran during the early stages of the revolution that brought Ayatollah Khomeni to power. He has spent his life trying to find ways that Muslims and non-Muslims can co-exist without fighting.

== Career ==
Harold Rhode taught Islamic history at the University of Delaware as an adjunct professor from 1979 until 1981. In May 1982, he joined the Office of the Under Secretary of Defense for Policy at the Pentagon as an adviser on the Islamic world with a special emphasis on Turkey, Iran, and Iraq. He retired from this position in 2010. During his tenure he wrote papers on how to understand, negotiate, and deal with Turkey, Iran, and Arab countries.

During the Gulf War, Rhode served as the Turkish Desk officer in the Office of the Secretary of Defense (OSD). While having this position he wrote papers for OSD officials on Iran, Iraq, and other Middle Eastern issues.

Between 1991 and 1994, Rhode served on the US Department of Defense’s Policy Planning Staff. While in this position he wrote strategy papers on Middle Eastern and Central Asian topics.

From 1994 until 2010, Rhode worked as an adviser on Islamic Affairs in the Office of Net Assessment, an in-house think tank for the Pentagon. He joined the US soldiers in the Iraq War as an expert, and was involved in the efforts to rescue the books of the Iraqi Jewish Archive. According to Rhode a huge help came by the men Ahmed Chalabi sent to drain the water that flooded the basements of the Iraqi Intelligence Service where the books were kept, and to pull the books out

== Probe ==
Rhode was a subject of a probe conducted by the Senate Intelligence Committee for a U.S. government-authorized meeting he and Larry Franklin had in Rome in late 2001 with Manucher Ghorbanifar, who was part of the Iran-Contra scandal.
