= Nabatieh Governorate =

Governorate of Lebanon

Nabatieh محافظة النبطية
- Map of Lebanon with Nabatieh highlighted
- Coordinates: 33°18′N 35°30′E
- Country: Lebanon
- Capital: Nabatieh

Government
  - Governor: Mahmoud Al-Mawla (Independent)

Area
  - Total: 1,058 km^{2} (408 sq mi)

Population (31 December 2017)
  - Total: 383,839
  - Density: 362.8/km^{2} (939.6/sq mi)
- Time zone: UTC+2 (EET)
  - Summer (DST): UTC+3 (EEST)

Nabatieh Governorate (Arabic: محافظة النبطية, Muḥāfaẓat an-Nabaṭiyyah) is one of the nine governorates of Lebanon. The area of this governorate is 1,058 km^{2}. The capital is Nabatieh.

== Demographics ==
According to registered voters in 2014:

Religion in the Nabatieh Governorate
1. Shia Islam (78.3%)
2. Sunni Islam (7.26%)
3. Christianity (10.4%)
4. Druze (3.67%)
5. Other (0.34%)

Year	Christians					Muslims				Druze
Year	Total	Maronites	Greek Orthodox	Greek Catholics	Other Christians	Total	Shias	Sunnis	Alawites	Druze
2014	10.41%	5.52%	2.44%	1.89%	0.56%	85.59%	78.32%	7.26%	0.01%	3.67%

== Districts ==
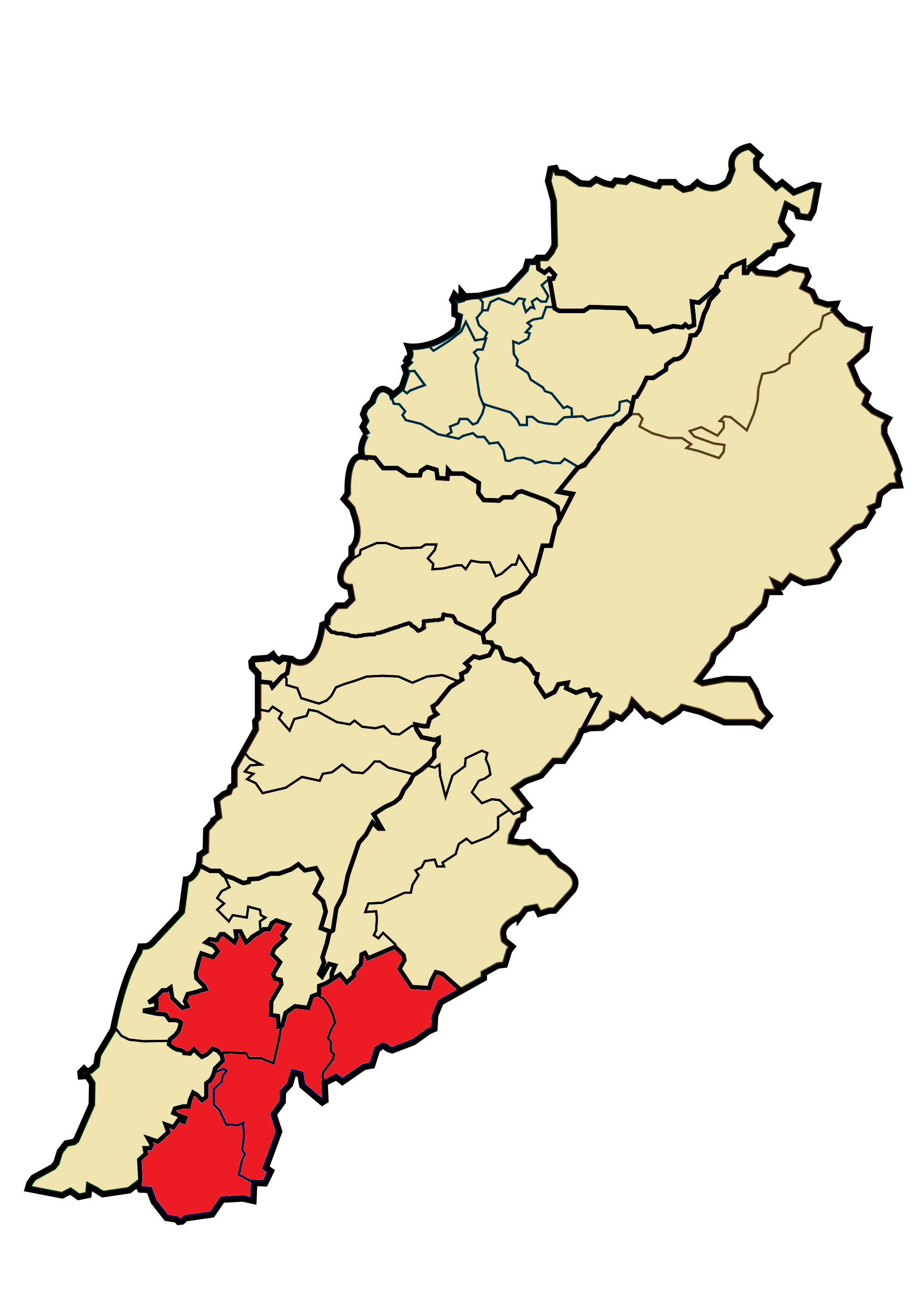
Districts of the Nabatieh Governorate

The governorate is divided into four districts (Aqdiya, singular qadaa) containing 130 municipalities. The capitals are in brackets:

- Bint Jbeil (Bint Jbeil) – 36 municipalities
- Hasbaya (Hasbaya) – 20 municipalities
- Marjayoun (Marjayoun) – 32 municipalities
- Nabatieh (Nabatieh) – 42 municipalities

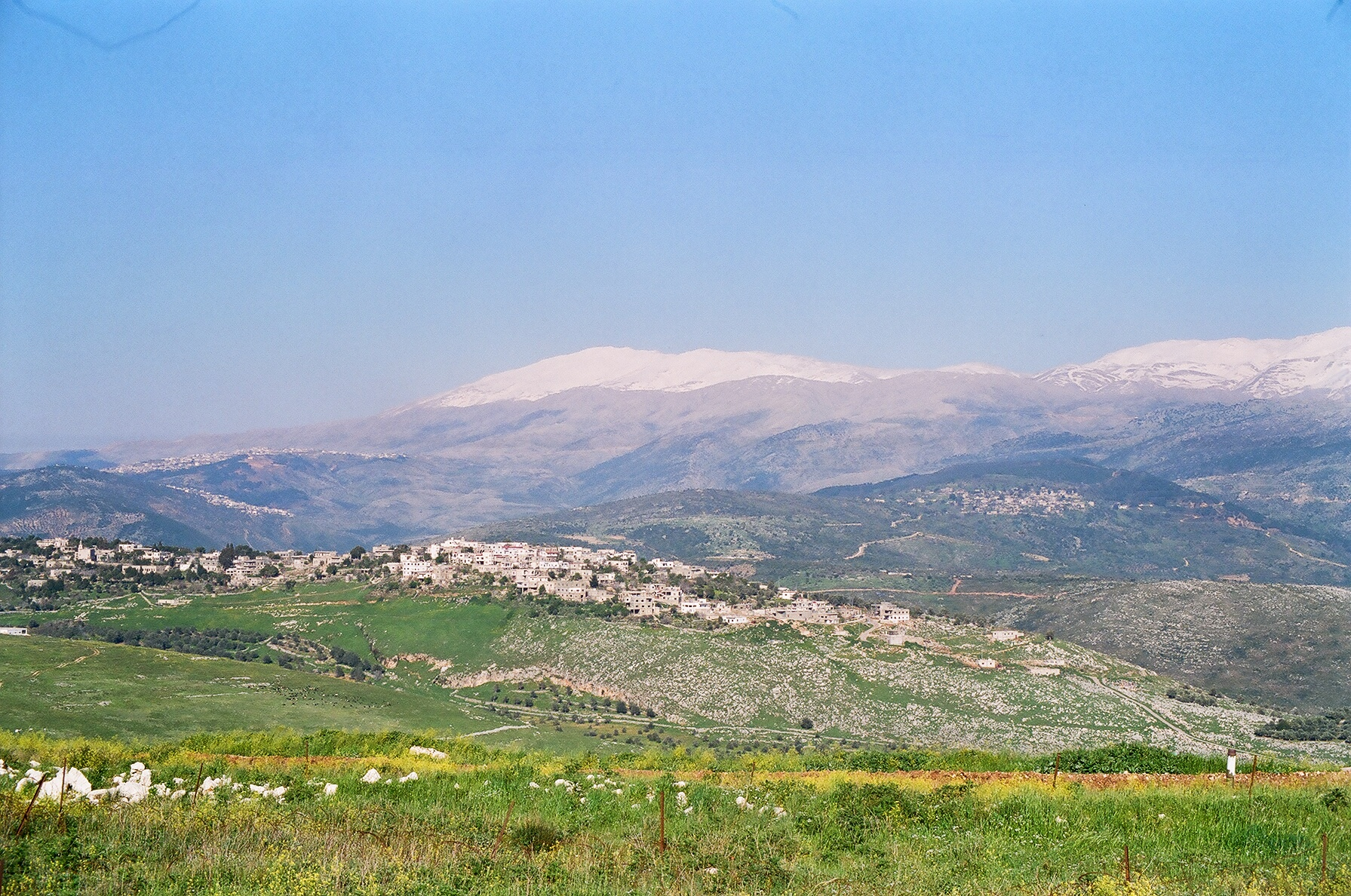
The view from Shreife IDF military post in Lebanon

== Cities, towns and villages ==
This list includes all cities, towns and villages with more than 6,000 registered voters in 2014:

English name	Population	District
Nabatieh	25,362	Nabatieh District
Bint Jbeil	20,760	Bint Jbeil District
Al-Khiyam	16,047	Marjayoun District
Shebaa	12,437	Hasbaya District
Mais al-Jabal	10,965	Marjayoun District
Aitaroun	9,332	Bint Jbeil District
Hasbaya	7,948	Hasbaya District
Taybeh	7,519	Marjayoun District
Shaqra	6,647	Bint Jbeil District
Marjayoun	6,479	Marjayoun District
Jibshit	6,219	Nabatieh District
Tibnin	6,183	Bint Jbeil District

== See also ==
- Southern Lebanon
- Jabal Amel
