= Timeline of the Israel–Hezbollah conflict (27 November 2024 – 26 February 2026) =

This timeline of the Israel–Hezbollah conflict covers the period from 27 November 2024, when the 2024 Israel–Lebanon ceasefire agreement was signed, to 26 February 2026.

== November 2024 ==
=== 27 November ===
- The IDF issued evacuation orders for residents of central and southern Beirut including in Ghobeiry.
- The IDF said that it hit 330 Hezbollah sites throughout Lebanon in the night leading up to the truce, including command centres, weapons depots, infrastructure used by the Radwan Force, and an underground precision missile plant. The IDF estimated that it killed several dozens of Hezbollah operatives in its strikes on a Radwan Force base in the Beqaa Valley. It also said that it killed an operations officer from Hezbollah's aerial unit in a strike in Beirut.
- The ceasefire deal between Israel and Hezbollah went into effect at 4:00 a.m. UTC+02:00.
- The IDF opened fire at people attempting to return to southern Lebanon, hitting several in Mais al-Jabal. It later announced that it killed an unspecified number of militants.
- Al Jazeera and LBC reported that Israeli soldiers opened fire on journalists covering the withdrawal of Israeli forces and the return of displaced residents to Khiam, injuring two of them.
- The IDF said that it arrested four suspects who approached Israeli soldiers in southern Lebanon.
- The IDF imposed a curfew in southern Lebanon until 7:00 a.m. UTC+02:00 the next day, saying that IDF is still deployed in its positions in southern Lebanon according to the terms of the ceasefire agreement, and its forces will deal firmly with any movement that violates this agreement.
- Al Jazeera reported that Israeli soldiers fired at people returning to their houses and villages in Lebanon, killing at least six people and injuring many others.

=== 28 November ===
- The Lebanese Health Ministry announced that 78 people were killed in Israeli attacks two days prior. The IDF said it have killed around 3,500 Hezbollah fighters.
- Al Jazeera reported that Israeli soldiers fired and injured two people in Markaba.
- Al Jazeera reported that an Israeli tank used two shells in the outskirts of Kfarchouba.
- The IDF said that the ceasefire was violated with the arrival of suspects, some of them with vehicles to several areas in southern Lebanon.
- The IDF carried out an airstrike on a rocket depot in southern Lebanon after identifying Hezbollah activity.
- The IDF prohibited travel within and towards the south of the Litani River from 5:00 p.m. UTC+02:00 until 7:00 a.m. UTC+02:00 the next day.
- The IDF warned residents to not return to 62 villages in southern Lebanon.

=== 29 November ===
- NNA reported that four Israeli tanks entered the western side of Khiam. It also reported that Israeli artillery shelled the outskirts of Markaba and Talloussah. Footage released by Lebanese media showed Israeli soldiers in Khiam firing at several people while they were attempting to attend a funeral despite prior approval from the Lebanese army and UNIFIL to visit.
- The IDF said that it struck a Hezbollah rocket launcher in southern Lebanon.

=== 30 November ===
- The IDF prohibited residents from returning to dozens more villages in southern Lebanon until further notice.
- Lebanese media reported that an Israeli airstrike hit a vehicle in Majdal Zoun injuring three people including a seven-year-old child. Another strike was reported south of Sidon, in Baisariyeh.
- The IDF said that it carried out an intelligence-based strike on border crossings used by Hezbollah for smuggling weapons from Syria to Lebanon.
- The IDF said that it located a Hezbollah weapons cache under a mosque in southern Lebanon and dispersed suspects approaching a restricted zone.
- The IDF renewed travel bans within and towards the south of the Litani River from 5:00 p.m. UTC+02:00 until 7:00 a.m. UTC+02:00 the next day.
- Al Jazeera reported that an Israeli drone strike in Rab Thalathin killed two people and wounded two others.
- A soldier was seriously injured during an operational IDF activity in northern Israel on the border with Lebanon.

== December 2024 ==
=== 1 December ===
- NNA reported several blasts on the outskirts of Yaroun and Maroun al-Ras.
- The IDF announced that soldiers from the Paratroopers Brigade killed several armed Hezbollah militants near a church in southern Lebanon the previous night.
- An Iranian airplane suspected of carrying arms to Hezbollah over Syrian airspace was ordered to turn around by Israeli fighter jets.

=== 2 December ===
- France accused Israel of violating its ceasefire in Lebanon 52 times, causing the death of three Lebanese civilians. Israel rejected the accusations saying Israel is enforcing the ceasefire terms in the face of Hezbollah's violations of the ceasefire that require an immediate response in real time.
- NNA reported that Israeli forces opened fire at homes in Naqoura with machine guns.
- The IDF again warned residents against returning to houses in some villages in south Lebanon.
- Al Jazeera reported that an Israeli drone hit a Lebanese army bulldozer that was conducting "fortification work" at a Lebanese army base in Hermel, moderately injuring a Lebanese soldier.
- The IDF said that it struck Hezbollah military vehicles operating in a Hezbollah missile manufacturing facility in the Beqaa Valley. It also said that it struck Hezbollah vehicles used for transporting weapons at several sites in the border between Syria and Lebanon in Hermel District and conducted strikes against Hezbollah operatives in southern Lebanon.
- Lebanese State Security said that one of its personnel was killed by an Israeli drone in Nabatieh.
- Hezbollah launched two mortars towards Shebaa Farms, claiming that it was responding defensively to repeated ceasefire violations by the IDF. In response, the IDF struck dozens of Hezbollah members and rocket launchers, including the one used in the mortar attack. Six people were killed in Haris and four others in Talloussah.
- Lebanon’s health ministry said that Israeli air strike in Marjayoun killed one person.

=== 3 December ===
- Hezbollah affiliated Al-Nour radio station announced that one of its journalists was killed in an Israeli strike.
- The IDF renewed bans on people returning to their houses in over 60 villages in south Lebanon.
- NNA reported that Israeli warplanes conducted a wave of strikes in a number of villages and towns in Tyre District and Bint Jbeil District. It also reported that the IDF returned for launching flares and thermal balloons before morning over the Aita al-Shaab.
- NNA reported an Israeli drone strike in Beit Lif.
- The Syrian state news agency reported that an Israeli strike on a car in Damascus airport road killed Salman Jumaa, Hezbollah's liaison with the Syrian army.
- The IDF said that it struck a militant cell in Aaqbeh village, Beqaa Governorate.
- the Lebanese Broadcasting Corporation reported that an Israeli drone strike in Shebaa killed one person.
- The IDF said that it destroyed Hezbollah infrastructure in Shebaa Farms.

=== 4 December ===
- The Lebanese Health Ministry increased the death toll from Israeli attacks in Lebanon to 4,047.
- Dozens of Lebanese families fled from south Lebanon again due to Israeli strikes.
- The IDF detained five Israelis after they illegally crossed into southern Lebanon.
- The IDF said that the IAF struck a Hezbollah launch pad in Majdal Zoun and destroyed combat equipment in Khiam, Sawwaneh and Aitaroun.

=== 5 December ===
- The IDF conducted three strikes in southern Lebanon.
- The IDF said that it destroyed Hezbollah underground infrastructure and killed militants in southern Lebanon.
- The NNA reported that Israeli soldiers launched stun grenades towards a residential building in Aitaroun, inflicting injuries.
- PIJ announced that three of its fighters were killed in Lebanon.
- Al Jazeera reported that an Israeli air strike in Aitaroun injured five people.

=== 6 December ===
- Israeli air strikes hit the Jousiya crossing and Arida crossing in the Syrian-Lebanese border. The IDF said that it struck routes used by Hezbollah for smuggling weapons.
- Israeli warplanes flew over Beirut and hit a target in the vicinity of the Litani River between the Yohmor al-Chaqif and Zawtar al-Sharqiyah. The IDF blew up more buildings in Odaisseh. Israeli drones also flew at low altitude over the southern suburbs of Beirut.
- A war monitor reported that the IDF was clearing Hezbollah weapons depots and military infrastructure in south Lebanon until 25 January.

=== 7 December ===
- Lebanese media report that an Israeli drone strike on a motorcycle in Deir Siryan killed one person.
- The IDF said that it struck a Hezbollah fighter who posed a threat to its soldiers in south Lebanon.
- Al Jazeera reported that an Israeli air strike in Beit Lif killed five people and injured five others.

=== 8 December ===
- The IDF hit a convoy of Hezbollah vehicles containing fighters that departed from al-Qusayr, Syria.
- An Israeli airstrike hit Hezbollah members at a weapons depot in Dibbin.
- Four IDF reservists, one of them holding a rank of major (res.), were killed near Labbouneh, south Lebanon. The soldiers were in an underground Hezbollah complex when an explosion occurred and an underground structure collapsed, killing them. The IDF said that according to an initial probe, it is likely that the soldiers unintentionally triggered explosives rigged by the IDF.

=== 9 December ===
- AFP reported that an Israeli air strike on a car on the Saf al-Hawa road in Bint Jbeil in the vicinity of a Lebanese army checkpoint killed one person and slightly injured four Lebanese soldiers.

=== 11 December ===
- The IDF withdrew from Khiam in compliance with the ceasefire agreement.
- Al Jazeera reported that Israeli strikes in three towns in southern Lebanon killed five people.

=== 12 December ===
- The IDF said that it conducted a drone strike on Hezbollah members in southern Lebanon. The Lebanese Health Ministry and media said that one person was killed and another person was wounded in the strike in Khiam.
- Lebanon’s NNA reported that three people were killed in an Israeli airstrike in Dibbine.

=== 13 December ===
- Lebanon’s NNA reported that the IDF conducted two air strikes in southern Lebanon.

=== 14 December ===
- The IDF said that the IAF struck a loaded and ready-to-use launcher in Lebanon that was aimed towards Israel.
- An Israeli drone strike on a vehicle in Al-Hardali reportedly killed a Hezbollah member.

=== 15 December ===
- The IDF announced that it destroyed more than 300 Hezbollah sites in the last three months.
- The IDF announced that its 91st Division seized more than 10,000 Hezbollah weapons.

=== 16 December ===
- The IDF warned residents of 73 villages in southern Lebanon against returning until further notice.
- An Israeli drone strike in al-Najariyah, Sidon District injured at least three people.
- The IDF said that it struck launchers positioned in Lebanon for firing towards Israel.

=== 17 December ===
- The IDF said that it seized a large Hezbollah weapons cache in southern Lebanon.
- The IDF said that it targeted a Hezbollah operative in Majdal Zoun who was loading up a vehicle with weapons. Reportedly three people were injured.

=== 18 December ===
- Israeli strikes destroyed two homes in Kfar Kila.
- The IDF acknowledged that a group of Israeli settlers crossed the northern border and entered Lebanon earlier this month before being dispersed by its soldiers.
- Israeli forces demolished several houses in Tayr Harfa, al-Jabeen and Shiheen. NNA reported that Israeli bulldozers demolished neighborhoods in Naqoura for the third consecutive day.

=== 19 December ===
- The Shin Bet and the Israel Police arrested and charged a 19-year-old Nazareth resident of spying for Hezbollah during the war.
- Israeli police arrested four Israeli civilians for illegally entering into Lebanon.
- The IDF said that it demolished Hezbollah rocket launchers in southern Lebanon aimed towards Israel.

=== 20 December ===
- NNA reported that Israeli forces blew up several homes and properties in Yaroun.
- Amnesty International accused Hezbollah of violating international law.

=== 22 December ===
- Lebanese agriculture minister Abbas Al Hajj Hassan accused the IDF of bulldozing of citrus orchards in Naqoura.
- Israeli authorities arrested two Jerusalem residents accused of providing information to Hezbollah.

=== 23 December ===
- The IDF indefinitely prohibited residents of 62 villages in southern Lebanon from returning.
- NNA reported that an Israeli strike on a group of people in Taybeh killed two people and injured another.

=== 24 December ===
- The IDF said it have seized more than 84,000 Hezbollah weapons.

=== 25 December ===
- An Israeli strike targeted warehouses believed to be owned by Hezbollah in Tarya, Baalbek District.

=== 27 December ===
- The IDF said that it struck Hezbollah infrastructure used for smuggling weapons from Syria to Lebanon in the vicinity of Janta village in the Syrian-Lebanese border.

=== 29 December ===
- NNA reported Israeli strikes including in areas between Markaba and Rab Thalathin.
- NNA reported two series of Israeli strikes in Mais al-Jabal.

=== 30 December ===
- The IDF conducted a secret raid on an underground facility used for producing Iranian missiles in Syria for disrupting weapons from reaching Hezbollah.

=== 31 December ===
- The Israeli Public Broadcasting Corporation reported Israeli airstrikes on targets in southern Lebanon, saying that they were used for transporting weapons.

== January 2025 ==
=== 1 January ===
- Israel claimed responsibility for a commando operation which destroyed an Iranian missile manufacturing site in Masyaf used for producing precision missiles for Hezbollah on 8 September. Israeli airstrikes around the facility reportedly killed at least 27 people and injured 43 others.

=== 2 January ===
- NNA reported that Israeli forces set fire to a number of homes in Aitaroun.
- The IDF said that its fighter jets struck medium-range rocket launchers in a Hezbollah position in southern Lebanon and another rocket launcher in the Iqlim al-Tuffah area, Nabatieh District.

=== 3 January ===
- NNA reported that the IDF conducted a bombing operation near Bani Haiyyan. It also reported another strike in Kfar Kila.
- Lebanese security forces searched passengers from a Mahan Air plane suspected of transferring funds to Hezbollah.
- NNA reported that Israeli forces set fire to houses in Houla, Marjayoun.

=== 4 January ===
- NNA reported Israeli strikes in Bani Haiyyan and Markaba.
- UNIFIL accused an IDF bulldozer of destroying a border marker at the Israeli-Lebanese border and a Lebanese Armed Forces observation tower in the vicinity a UNIFIL position.

=== 5 January ===
- Israeli Defense Minister Israel Katz accused Hezbollah of still not withdrawing beyond the Litani river per the ceasefire terms.
- NNA reported an Israeli bombing in Marjayoun.

=== 6 January ===
- Al Jazeera reported that an Israeli strike in Khiam killed at least seven people.
- The Lebanese army said that it deployed to areas around Naqoura in collaboration with UNIFIL following the withdrawal of the IDF.

=== 7 January ===
- The IDF reiterated evacuation orders for over 60 villages in southern Lebanon.
- The Lebanese army said that it started deploying its units in Aalma ash-Shaab, Tayr Harfa and Bint Jbeil among other villages and towns following the IDF's withdrawal.

=== 8 January ===
- US Secretary of State Antony Blinken said that over a third of Israeli forces withdrew from Lebanon.

=== 9 January ===
- The IDF said that an IAF drone struck a vehicle in southern Lebanon after identifying suspects loading weapons into it from buildings used by Hezbollah.

=== 10 January ===
- NNA reported that Israeli artillery struck Ayta ash-Shaab.
- Lebanon's Health Ministry said that an Israeli strike hit a vehicle in Tayr Debba, killing five people and injuring four others. The IDF said that its drone strike targeted a vehicle loaded with weapons by Hezbollah militants.

=== 11 January ===
- The Lebanese Army said that it was concluding its deployment of soldiers to the western part of southern Lebanon after the withdrawal of Israeli forces.
- An Israeli strike in Kounin injured two people. The IDF said that it conducted a drone strike after spotting several Hezbollah militants leaving a building known to be used by Hezbollah.
- The IDF said that its warplanes killed three suspects in Shebaa Farms who were moving inside Lebanese territory in the vicinity of the Israeli border.

=== 12 January ===
- An elderly woman died of serious wounds from a Hezbollah rocket attack on Nahariya on 25 November.
- Israeli airstrikes were reported north of the Litani River in Houmine al-Faouqa, Nabatieh District, and in Yanta, Beqaa Governorate. The IDF said that it attacked several Hezbollah sites including a rocket launcher, a Hezbollah military site and routes used for smuggling weapons to Hezbollah in Syrian-Lebanese border. It also said that it struck Hezbollah targets after notifying the ceasefire mechanism and accused it of failing to address "threats".

=== 13 January ===
- NNA reported that Israeli forces conducted a "large bombing operation" in Kfar Kila and blew up several houses in Ayta ash-Shaab.
- Israel's ambassador to the UN Danny Danon accused Hezbollah of attempting to rebuild with Iranian help.

=== 14 January ===
- NNA reported that the IDF conducted large blasts in Mais al-Jabal and Kfar Kila, destroying civilian houses.

=== 15 January ===
- NNA reported that the IDF conducted "a bombing operation” in Markaba.
- NNA reported Israeli shelling on the outskirts of Kfarchouba.

=== 17 January ===
- The Syrian public security directorate said that it thwarted an attempt to smuggle weapons to Lebanon through an illegal border crossing.
- UN secretary general António Guterres said that UNIFIL uncovered more than 100 weapons caches in southern Lebanon belonging to Hezbollah or other armed groups since the ceasefire between the group and Israel.
- NNA reported that the IDF blew up several houses in Mais al-Jabal and arrested a Syrian citizen who was grazing a herd of cattle on the outskirts of Rmaish.

=== 22 January ===
- NNA reported that the Israeli forces burned down and destroyed houses in Taybeh.
- NNA reported that the Israeli strikes caused two large explosions on the outskirts of Mais al-Jabal.
- The Lebanese Army said that it concluded its deployment in Kfarchouba following the IDF withdrawal. NNA reported that that Israeli forces blew up at least three houses in Deir Mimas.

=== 23 January ===
- Israeli police said that it arrested an East Jerusalem resident suspected of collaborating with Hezbollah.

=== 24 January ===
- Security sources told Asharq Al-Awsat that the Lebanese Army carried out 500 missions to dismantle Hezbollah military infrastructure south of the Litani river per the 2024 Israel–Lebanon ceasefire agreement. Sources monitoring the implementation of the deal said that Hezbollah is "fully cooperating with the decisions of the Lebanese authorities".
- The IDF said that it conducted strikes in southern Lebanon to “remove threats" in recent days.
- Israeli Prime Minister Benjamin Netanyahu said that the IDF will not complete its withdrawal from southern Lebanon by the 60-day deadline stated in the 2024 ceasefire agreement, saying that Lebanon “has not yet fully enforced” its obligations under the truce. US President Donald Trump supported a short and temporary extension.
- The Lebanese Army deployed forces to Chihine and al-Jebbin after the IDF's withdrawal.

=== 25 January ===
- The IDF warned residents against returning to dozens of Lebanese villages in the vicinity of the Israeli border until further notice.
- Several Lebanese suspected of collaboration with Israel were arrested by Lebanese authorities.
- NNA reported bombings and explosions in Kfar Kila and Meiss el-Jabal.

=== 26 January ===
- Twenty-four people including nine children and a paramedic were killed while 134 others were injured by Israeli forces who opened fire after they allegedly tried to return to villages, towns and cities in south Lebanon. The IDF accused Hezbollah of sending "rioters" to southern Lebanon. An IDF official said that Hezbollah operatives were among those attempted to return to villages, towns and cities in southern Lebanon. Lebanese media reported that Israeli soldiers arrested two Lebanese men in Houla. The IDF said that it operated to "remove the threat" as a vehicle with Hezbollah flags approached an area where its soldiers were stationed.
- SANA reported that Syrian authorities seized an arms shipment for Hezbollah after intercepting smuggling routes on the Lebanon-Syria border in Serghaya.
- Israeli soldiers opened fire on a Lebanese army vehicle in Deir Mimas and lightly injured a female Lebanese soldier.
- The Lebanese Army said that Israeli gunfire killed a Lebanese soldier in Marwahin-Dhayra road in the Tyre District and injured another soldier in Mais al-Jabal].
- In a phone call, French President Macron told Israeli PM Netanyahu to "withdraw his forces still present in Lebanon".
- The 60 days ceasefire period ended; however the IDF said it would not withdraw unless the Lebanese army was deployed to replace Hezbollah as it withdraws from south of the country.

=== 27 January ===
- After midnight (Israel and Lebanon time), the United States issued a statement saying that the ceasefire arrangement between Israel and Lebanon will continue to be in effect until February 18. Lebanese caretaker Prime Minister Najib Mikati, and Israel's defense minister Israel Katz, confirmed that their countries will continue adhering to the ceasefire until 18 February.
- The Lebanese, Israeli and US governments agreed to start negotiations to release Lebanese citizens held in Israeli jails.
- The Lebanese Health Ministry said that an Israeli fire killed two people, including a child and a paramedic and injured 17 others during protests against Israeli presence in south Lebanon.
- The Lebanese Army deployed units to Marjayoun and other border areas in the southern Litani region after the IDF’s withdrawal.

=== 28 January ===
- The IDF again warned Lebanese civilians from returning to villages near the Israeli border.
- Lebanese media reported an Israeli airstrike in Nabatieh al-Fawqa that injured 20 people. The IDF said that it struck a truck and other vehicles used by Hezbollah to transport arms. Another Israeli strike in Zawtar injured four people.
- Lebanese Army said that an Israeli strike hit a convoy of displaced residents returning to the border towns in southern Lebanon in Yaroun, injuring one soldier and injured three civilians.

=== 29 January ===
- Lebanese Health Ministry reported that Israeli strikes in Lebanon wounded eight people.
- The Turkish foreign ministry said that three Turkish citizens were killed in an Israeli airstrike while trying to cross illegally from Lebanon to Israel.

=== 30 January ===
- The IDF said that it conducted an airstrike on an engineering equipment used by Hezbollah to rebuild its militant infrastructure in southern Lebanon in violation of the truce agreement.
- The IDF said that the IAF intercepted a Hezbollah surveillance drone launched towards Israel.

=== 31 January ===
- The IDF said that its fighter jets conducted overnight strikes on Hezbollah targets in the Beqaa Valley, killing two people and injuring ten others.
- The Wall Street Journal reported that Israel told the Lebanon ceasefire committee that Iran is funding Hezbollah by "smuggling" cash through Beirut airport. Hezbollah denied the report.
- The IDF said that it launched an interceptor missile towards a “suspicious aerial target” above Zar'it.

== February 2025 ==
=== 2 February ===
- Lebanese media reported that a fisherman was detained by the Israeli Navy off the coast of Naqoura. It also claimed that Israeli forces opened fire on civilians trying to return to Yaroun and on protestors in Kfar Kila. The IDF warned against returning until further notice.

=== 4 February ===
- NNA reported that Israeli forces conducted a large-scale demolition operation in southern Lebanon.
- The Lebanese Army said that it was deployed in Taybeh.

=== 6 February ===
- The IDF struck Hezbollah weapon storage sites in Nabatieh and the Beqaa Valley.

=== 7 February ===
- Lebanese media outlets reported an Israeli airstrike in the vicinity of Tebna, south of Sidon. NNA reported an Israeli air strike in Al-Bazouriyah and another strike in Kfar Kila. The IDF said that it targeted Hezbollah for violating the truce deal.
- A Hezbollah field commander and his two daughters were killed when their home exploded in Tayr Harfa. The IDF said that the explosion was caused by a Hezbollah bomb intended for an attack. Lebanese media outlets said that they were killed by leftover Israeli munitions.

=== 8 February ===
- NNA reported that six people were killed and two others were injured in an Israeli airstrike in the Beqaa Valley. The IDF said that it targeted Hezbollah militants operating at a strategic arms manufacturing and storing site.

=== 9 February ===
- Lebanese media reported Israeli airstrikes in the vicinity of Houmine, Aazze and Kafroue villages in Nabatieh Governorate. The IDF said that it struck a tunnel between Lebanon and Syria used for smuggling weapons by Hezbollah and other Hezbollah targets including arms and rocket launchers that “posed an immediate threat” to Israel.

=== 10 February ===
- The Lebanese Army said that it completed its deployment in Rab Thalathin, Talloussah and Bani Haiyyan after the IDF's withdrawal.

=== 12 February ===
- NNA reported that Israeli forces burned several houses and a farm in Al-Aadaissah, claiming that it was a violation of the truce.
- The IDF said that Iran's Quds Force attempted to smuggle money to Hezbollah through Beirut–Rafic Hariri International Airport using civilian flights and estimated that some of the money transfers were conducted successfully despite regularly updating the US-led committee supervising the truce with relevant information to thwart them. Later, the Lebanese Broadcasting Corporation International reported that Lebanese aviation authorities informed two Mahan Air flights that it will not be able to land in Lebanon. It also reported that Iran Air was also not allowed to land in Lebanon. The Iranian foreign ministry accused Israel of disrupting normal flights to Beirut airport. Iran said that Lebanese flights will not be able to land in Iran.

=== 13 February ===
- Hezbollah-owned Al-Manar media outlet reported that Israeli forces set fire to houses and properties in Odaisseh.
- The IDF said that it carried out airstrikes on Hezbollah facilities that stored weapons and rocket launchers.
- Speaker of the Parliament of Lebanon Nabih Berri rejected an Israeli demand to keep troops stationed on five areas in southern Lebanon past the ceasefire deadline of 18 February. Israel accused Lebanon of not fulfilling its truce obligations.

=== 14 February ===
- Two people were wounded, including UNIFIL deputy force commander Chok Bahadur Dhakal, after Hezbollah supporters attacked the convoy of his commanding officer Aroldo Lázaro Sáenz outside Beirut–Rafic Hariri International Airport. Hezbollah condemned the attack.

=== 15 February ===
- Lebanese authorities detained over 25 people in response to the 14 February attack on the UNIFIL convoy.
- NNA reported an Israeli drone strike in the outskirts of Ainata.
- Lebanese media reported that an Israeli drone struck a vehicle in the vicinity of Jarjouaa, killing two people and injuring five others including two children. The IDF said it targeted Abbas Ahmad Hamoud, a senior member of Hezbollah's aerial unit who "repeatedly violated" the ceasefire agreement. A strike caused the collapse of a building in Ain Qana, killing one person.

=== 16 February ===
- The IDF detained approximately 20 ultra-Orthodox Jewish Israelis for illegally entering Lebanon overnight.
- A woman was reportedly killed and several others were injured in Houla by Israeli gunfire. Three people were also detained. The IDF said that it fired warning shots at a group that gathered in the area.
- Israeli airstrikes were reported in Harbata and Halbata in the Baalbek District. The IDF said it hit Hezbollah sites.

=== 17 February ===
- Lebanese media reported an Israeli incursion in Kfar Chouba after Lebanese army was deployed in the area. NNA reported that an Israeli drone dropped a hand grenade in the main square of the same area, which is in vicinity of a school.
- The IDF and Shin Bet conducted a drone strike on a car near Sidon that killed Muhammad Shaheen, Hamas's head of operations in Lebanon who allegedly directed rocket attacks against Israel and planned attacks on Israeli citizens.
- The IDF said that it destroyed a Radwan tunnel in Shebaa Farms that stored several weapons caches.
- Israeli foreign minister Gideon Sa'ar accused Turkey of collaborating with Iran to fund Hezbollah during a meeting with a US delegation.
- The IDF confirmed that it will remain in five strategic points in southern Lebanon after the 18 February deadline to withdraw as part of the truce deal.
- Israeli media revealed previously undisclosed four drone flights from Lebanon into Israel in the past weeks, being a violation by Hezbollah of the ceasefire agreement.
- The Lebanese Presidency announced the extended suspension of flights from Iran after a cabinet meeting.
- A Lebanese security official said that Israeli forces started to withdraw from border villages, including Mais al-Jabal and Blida, as the Lebanese army advanced.

=== 18 February ===
- Lebanese media reported that Israeli forces conducted a large controlled demolition in Kfar Shouba prior to its withdrawal from the area.
- NNA reported that Israeli forces withdrew from several towns and villages in south Lebanon except five points in the Israeli-Lebanese border. The Lebanese Army said that it deployed to the border after withdrawal of Israeli forces. Israeli Defense Minister Israel Katz said that IDF will "forcefully" enforce the truce agreement against violations by Hezbollah. The Lebanese government said that any remaining Israeli presence in Lebanon will be considered as an occupation. and demanded the full withdrawal of the IDF.
- Lebanese Civil Defense announced that it recovered 23 bodies from four towns on the Israel–Lebanon border following Israel's withdrawal.

=== 19 February ===
- Israeli police said that it arrested four Israelis for illegally crossing the border into Lebanon overnight and hurling rocks towards IDF soldiers.
- Lebanese media reported that an Israeli drone struck a car in Ayta ash-Shaab. Saudi media outlet AlHadath reported that a Hezbollah member was killed in the strike, while a woman was critically wounded. NNA reported that two people were injured separately in Wazzani after Israeli forces opened fire. The IDF said that it targeted a Hezbollah operative who handled weapons.
- The IDF said that it fired warning shots at a group of people gathered near the Israeli border in Kfar Kila.

=== 20 February ===
- Lebanese media outlet Al Mayadeen reported an Israeli airstrike in Akkar District. The IDF said that it targeted a border crossing used by Hezbollah to smuggle weapons.

=== 21 February ===
- The al-Quds Brigades said one of its fighters was killed during a battle with Israeli forces in Lebanon.

=== 22 February ===
- The IDF said that it struck the Syrian-Lebanese border to thwart Hezbollah weapons smuggling.

=== 23 February ===
- Lebanese media reported a series of Israeli airstrikes in the vicinity of Al-Qlailah and Zibqin near Tyre, injuring a Syrian girl and damaging a number of houses. The IDF said that targeted a Hezbollah military site containing rocket launchers and other arms where it identified the group's activity and several other Hezbollah rocket launchers in southern Lebanon.
- Lebanese media reported an Israeli airstrike in the vicinity of Brissa village, Hermel District.
- Lebanese media reported Israeli airstrikes in the vicinity of Bodai and in the vicinity of al-Ahmadiya in southern Lebanon. The IDF said that it targeted Hezbollah sites containing rocket launchers and other arms in Baalbek and other areas of south Lebanon after identifying the group's activity.

=== 24 February ===
- The Wall Street Journal reported that Hezbollah told its operatives who do not live south of the Litani River to vacate the area to allow the Lebanese Army to take control as part of the truce agreement.

=== 25 February ===
- Lebanese media reported an Israeli airstrike in the Beqaa Valley. Lebanese media outlet Al Mayadeen reported that two people were killed and two others were injured in the strike. The IDF said that it conducted the strike after identifying militants at a Hezbollah strategic weapons manufacturing and storage facility.

=== 26 February ===
- NNA reported that Israeli warplanes carried out mock raids while an Israeli surveillance drone flew above Lebanon.
- NNA reported that an Israeli drone strike on a car in the Hermel-Qasr road killed one person and injured another. The IDF said that it conducted an airstrike targeting Mahran Ali Nasruddin, a "significant" member of Hezbollah's Unit 4400 responsible for smuggling Iranian weapons after he “repeatedly violated” the truce.

=== 27 February ===
- The Lebanese Health Ministry said that one person was killed and another wounded after two Israeli air strikes hit a car in Hermel.
- The IDF said that it conducted a drone strike on a Hezbollah observation post in Aynata where it identified activity.
- Al Jazeera Arabic reported an Israeli drone strike in Deir Qanoun an-Naher.

=== 28 February ===
- The IDF said that it killed Hezbollah member Muhammad Mahdi Ali Shaheen in an air strike in Hermel, saying that he was responsible for coordinating weapons procurement around the Syria-Lebanon border since the start of the truce between Israel and Hezbollah.
- Three sources said that authorities at Beirut airport seized $2.5 million in cash allegedly destined for Hezbollah.

== March 2025 ==
=== 2 March ===
- Asharq Al-Awsat reported that the estimated death toll of the war in Lebanon since 8 October 2023 was increased to 6,000 after Lebanese medics recovered bodies from south Lebanon villages formerly occupied by Israel.

=== 3 March ===
- The PIJ said that one of its militants was killed while confronting Israeli "aggression" in Lebanon.

=== 4 March ===
- Lebanese media reported that an Israeli drone strike in Rechknanay killed one person. The IDF said that it killed a naval commander in Hezbollah's Radwan Force who "violated truce".

=== 5 March ===
- NNA reported that an Israeli drone strike on a vehicle near a rubbish dump in Ras Naqoura wounded two siblings who were "collecting scrap metal". The IDF said that it conducted a drone strike on a vehicle after it identified a group of suspects loading up weapons.

=== 7 March ===
- NNA reported consecutive Israeli airstrikes in several places in south Lebanon. The IDF said that it targeted Hezbollah military sites used for storing weapons and rocket launchers.

=== 8 March ===
- Lebanese media reported that an Israeli drone strike on a car between Kherbet Selem and Al-Jumayjimah caused casualties. The IDF said that it targeted a Hezbollah operative who was involved in the rehabilitation of Hezbollah infrastructure and directed its operations in south Lebanon. Lebanese Civil Defense said that one person was killed and another injured in an Israeli air strike on Khirbet Selem.
- The Lebanese Army said that it found Israeli espionage devices on the outskirts of Kfarchouba and deployed specialised military units to dismantle them.

=== 9 March ===
- The Jerusalem Post reported that an Israeli drone which was observing a funeral in Kfar Kila opened fire at several suspects who approached Israeli forces. Lebanese media reported that one person died of a heart attack after the incident, and several others were injured.

=== 10 March ===
- Al-Akhbar reported that a Lebanese soldier was injured by IDF fire in the vicinity of the Shanouh Farm on the outskirts of Kfar Shouba before being abducted to Israel.

=== 11 March ===
- NNA reported that a drone strike targeted a car on a road in Deir ez-Zahrani. An-Nahar reported one casualty from the strike. The IDF said that its drone strike in Nabatieh targeted Hassan Abbas Izzedine, a commander of Hezbollah's aerial defense unit who "led attempts to rebuild the unit’s infrastructure" and another strike targeted a group of Hezbollah militants who were spotted at a Hezbollah facility in Froun.
- Five Lebanese detainees held by the IDF were released.

=== 13 March ===
- The Lebanese Army said that it received a fifth Lebanese soldier from Israeli custody.
- Lebanese media reported an Israeli strike in the Bekaa Valley. The IDF said it targeted a Hezbollah strategic weapons production and storage site.

=== 15 March ===
- Lebanese media and the Lebanese Health Ministry reported that an Israeli drone struck a car with two occupants in Borj al-Mlouk, killing one person. The IDF said that it targeted a Hezbollah member.

=== 16 March ===
- NNA reported that an Israeli strike on a car in the vicinity of Yatar killed one person and injured another person. The IDF said that it targeted two Hezbollah militants whom it accused of violating the ceasefire.
- Lebanese Health Ministry said that one person was killed in an Israeli strike in Mais al-Jabal and NNA reported another death due to Israeli strike in Bint Jbeil.
- A parked car in Avivim was struck by apparent gunfire from Lebanon, resulting in no casualties. Israeli Defense Minister Israel Katz rejected claims that it was a errant gunfire from the funeral of a Hezbollah militant held in a nearby village and ordered the IDF to respond to the gunfire. Lebanese media outlets reported that two people were killed in an Israeli airstrike in Ainata. Additional Israeli shelling and drone strikes were reported in south Lebanon including in Kfar Kila and Yaroun. The IDF said that it hit a command center belonging to Hezbollah's Redwan Force and other buildings used by the group.

=== 17 March ===
- Lebanese media reported that an Israeli strike on a car in Yohmor killed at two people and injured two others. The IDF said that it targeted two Hezbollah observation operatives who directed militant activities.
- At least four Israeli strikes were reported by Lebanese media in the Beqaa Valley. The IDF said that it targeted Hezbollah military sites after spotting militants and weapons.

=== 20 March ===
- NNA reported Israeli airstrikes in an area between Jbaa, Zhalta, and Snaya in the vicinity of Jezzine in south Lebanon and in Janta. The IDF said that it conducted airstrikes on two Hezbollah facilities in Beqaa Valley after identifying one of its underground infrastructure and another site used for storing rocket launchers.

=== 22 March ===
- The IDF said that it intercepted three rockets launched from Lebanon towards Metula. It also said that at six rockets were fired and three of those rockets apparently fell short in Lebanon. The Lebanese Army said that it located and dismantled three rocket launchers used to fire rockets. NNA reported, citing Lebanese Public Health Emergency Operations Center that at least five people including a girl were killed and 10 others, including two children were wounded in an Israeli airstrike in Touline. The IDF said that it targeted dozens of Hezbollah rocket launchers and a command center used by the group as a response to rocket fire. Hezbollah denied responsibility for the attack, prompting both the IDF and the Lebanese Army to open an investigation. Later, Netanyahu and Israeli Defense Minister Israel Katz instructed the IDF to conduct a second series of airstrikes targeting Hezbollah. The Lebanese Health Ministry said that at least one man was killed and in an Israeli strike in Tyre, while another strike in Al-Qlailah killed one person. It also said 40 people were wounded. Later, a 60-year-old man and a young women died from the injuries sustained from the strikes.

=== 23 March ===
- NNA reported that an Israeli drone struck a car in Ayta ash Shab. Al Jazeera reported that it killed a Hezbollah commander while the IDF said that it killed a Hezbollah militant.

=== 24 March ===
- NNA, citing the Lebanese Health Ministry, reported that an Israeli drone strike on a vehicle in Qaaqaait al-Jisr killed one person. The IDF said that it killed a Hezbollah antitank unit commander in a strike in Nabatieh District.

=== 25 March ===
- NNA reported that Israeli forces fired military flares towards Lebanese villages on the border's western sector. Lebanese media outlets reported that an Israeli drone dropped stun grenades in the vicinity of a mosque in Mais al-Jabal.

=== 26 March ===
- The IAF said that it struck 40 Hezbollah targets in Lebanon in the past week.
- The IDF said that its drone strike in Derdghaya killed Ahmed Adnan Bajija, a battalion commander of the Radwan Force whom it accused of violating the ceasefire.

=== 27 March ===
- NNA reported that Israeli artillery launched six shells towards al-Dabash neighbourhood in Yohmor al-Shaqif in Nabatieh Governorate, coinciding with an Israeli drone strike on a car. The IDF said that it conducted an airstrike on a Hezbollah cell moving weapons in the area. NNA reported that the strike killed at least three people.
- The Lebanese Health Ministry said that an Israeli strike in Baraachit killed two people. The IDF said that it conducted a drone strike on two Hezbollah militants in the area.

=== 28 March ===
- The IDF said that two rockets were launched towards north Israel from Lebanon, one of which was intercepted while the other landed inside Lebanese territory. Hezbollah denied launching the rockets. The IDF issued evacuation orders for a building in Hadath, Mount Lebanon to move at least 300 metres, saying that it is a Hezbollah facility. Lebanese media outlets later reported an Israeli airstrike in Beirut. The IDF later said that it struck a facility used by Hezbollah for storing drones. The Lebanese Health Ministry said that an Israeli airstrike in Kfar Tebnit killed one person and wounded eight, including three children. Another Israeli strike in Yohmor River road in south Lebanon killed two Syrian workers. Lebanese Health Ministry said that an Israeli strike in Beit Yahoun injured two people. The Lebanese Army said that it found the rocket launcher used to launch the projectiles and launched a probe to find which group was responsible for the incident. The IDF said that the IAF targeted 15 Hezbollah targets in Lebanon in response.

=== 29 March ===
- NNA reported that Israeli forces opened fire towards eastern neighbourhoods in Kfar Shouba, Hasbaya, damaging houses and cars.
- Lebanese media reported that Israeli forces opened fire towards a French infantry unit serving in UNIFIL while inspecting a dirt mound put up by Israeli forces in Rmaish.

=== 30 March ===
- The Lebanese General Security agency said that it detained a number of suspects accused of launching projectiles towards Israel.

== April 2025 ==
=== 1 April ===
- An Israeli strike in Dahieh, killed Hassan Bdair, a Hezbollah and Quds Force member whom Israeli authorities accused of coordination with Hamas to conduct a significant and imminent attack against Israel and three others including a woman. Seven others were injured.

=== 3 April ===
- The Quds News Network reported that Israeli forces conducted three air strikes in Naqoura. NNA reported that Israeli forces conducted more strikes in the same area, including a strike on a house in its centre and a second in its outskirts.
- NNA reported that an Israeli airstrike on a vehicle in Alma ash-Shaab injured one person. The IDF said that it conducted a drone strike on a Hezbollah militant.

=== 6 April ===
- The Lebanese Health Ministry reported that an Israeli strike in Zibqin killed two people. The IDF said that it targeted two Hezbollah militants trying to restore militant infrastructure.

=== 7 April ===
- The Lebanese Health Ministry said that an Israeli drone strike in Taybeh killed one person. The IDF said that it killed a Hezbollah commander who led a rocket unit in the area and several rocket attacks on Upper Galilee.
- NNA reported that an Israeli drone strike on a car in Beit Lif injured one person.
- NNA reported that an Israeli strike on a motorcycle in Dardara road in Marjayoun District killed two Syrians and a Lebanese national.

=== 8 April ===
- The IDF said that it struck a Hezbollah weapons depot in the Beqaa Valley.

=== 9 April ===
- The IDF accused Hezbollah of trying to rebuild a weapons manufacturing site in Beirut in violation of the truce.
- NNA reported that an Israeli drone targeted an area near a public school in Ramiyah, Lebanon without causing casualties.

=== 10 April ===
- Lebanese TV station Al Jadeed reported that the Lebanese Army entered Hezbollah bases north of the Litani River after Hezbollah surrendered bases in the area to the Lebanese Army for the first time.

=== 12 April ===
- The IDF said that an IDF reservist was critically wounded during operations on the Lebanon border. Per an initial IDF investigation, the soldier was critically wounded after soldiers mistakenly entered an Israeli minefield.

=== 15 April ===
- An Israeli drone strike struck a car in Aitaroun. The Lebanese Health Ministry reported the strike killed two people including a 17-year-old and wounded two others. The IDF said that it killed a team commander in Hezbollah's special operations unit.
- NNA reported three consecutive Israeli strikes in Wadi Mazlam on the outskirts of Ramya in Nabatieh Governorate. The IDF said that its overnight strikes hit Hezbollah infrastructure.

=== 16 April ===
- An Israeli drone struck a car in Wadi al-Hujeir.
- The IDF said that it killed a Radwan Force member in a drone strike in Al-Qantara, Marjayoun.
- An Israeli strike in Hanin, Lebanon killed one person and wounded another. The IDF said that it conducted drone strike, targeting a Hezbollah militant.
- Lebanese Army said that it arrested Lebanese and Palestinians suspected of launching rockets towards Israel from south Lebanon on 22 March and 25 March.
- An Israeli strike hit the outskirts of Zalutiyeh.

=== 17 April ===
- The IDF said that it struck Hezbollah facilities in its overnight strike in south Lebanon.
- An Israeli air strike in Aitaroun killed one person.
- The IDF said that it killed the deputy commander of Hezbollah forces in Mhaibib in a drone strike in Blida, Lebanon.

=== 18 April ===
- An Israeli drone strike hit a car in Ghaziyeh, south of Sidon, killing one person. The IDF said that it killed a Hezbollah militant responsible for deploying its communication networks throughout Lebanon, particularly south of the Litani River.
- An Israeli drone strike on a vehicle travelling on a road between Ayta ash-Shaab and Rmaish killed one person. The IDF said that it killed a Hezbollah militant.

=== 20 April ===
- The Lebanese Army announced that it thwarted a planned rocket at Israel from Lebanon and arrested those involved.
- An Israeli drone on a car in Kaoutariyet as-Siyad, situated between Sidon and Tyre, killed one person and injured another. The IDF said that it killed Hezbollah’s Unit 4400 deputy head, which is responsible for weapons smuggling to Lebanon.
- An Israeli strike hit a home in Houla, Lebanon, killing one person. The IDF said that it killed a Hezbollah engineering expert responsible for its engineering activities in Odaisseh.
- The IDF said that it conducted a series of airstrikes in Nabatieh, targeting Hezbollah rocket launchers and other infrastructure used by the group.

=== 22 April ===
- An Israeli drone struck a car in the vicinity of Baaourta in Chouf District, killing one person. The IDF said that it killed a prominent Al-Jama’a al-Islamiyya militant who was also affiliated with Hamas in Lebanon and advanced attacks on Israel. Al-Jama’a al-Islamiyya confirmed that its leader was killed in the strike.
- An Israeli drone strike in Haniyeh, Tyre District killed at least one person. The IDF said that it killed a Hezbollah commander overseeing Majdal Zoun.

=== 27 April ===
- An Israeli drone strike in Halta killed at least one person. The IDF said that it killed a Hezbollah militant involved in regroupment and rearmament efforts.
- The IDF warned to evacuate at least 300 metres from a building in Beirut which is said was a Hezbollah facility. Later, an Israeli air strike was reported in southern Beirut. Israeli Prime Minister Benjamin Netanyahu and Israeli Defence Minister Israel Katz said that the IDF targeted a Hezbollah precision missile warehouse.
- An Israeli drone attack was reported in al-Majidia in the eastern sector of the border.

=== 28 April ===
- An Israeli airstrike hit Aitaroun.
- The IDF said that it hit over 50 targets in Lebanon in the last month.

=== 30 April ===
- A security official said that the Lebanese Army dismantled more than 90% of Hezbollah infrastructure south of the Litani river.

== May 2025 ==
=== 1 May ===
- Three people including two Syrians and one Lebanese were killed in an Israeli airstrike on a vehicle in Mais al-Jabal. The IDF said it launched two strikes that killed a Radwan Force militant and a militant conducting surveillance operations along the border.

=== 3 May ===
- NNA reported an Israeli air strike on a vehicle in Khartoum, Lebanon.

=== 5 May ===
- Lebanese media reported that Israeli airstrikes hit Janta area of Beqaa Valley. The IDF said that it targeted infrastructure at a Hezbollah “strategic weapons” production and storage site in the Beqaa Valley after identifying Hezbollah's work to restore the facility, which was targeted in the past. It also said that it attacked several more Hezbollah targets in Srifa.

=== 6 May ===
- Turkish media outlets reported that Turkish intelligence foiled a second pager attack in Lebanon.
- NNA reported that an Israeli strike on a car in Kfar Reman killed one person and injured three others.
- The IDF said that it killed a Hezbollah commander in a drone attack in Nabatieh.

=== 8 May ===
- Fourteen Israeli strikes were reported in Nabatieh area. The IDF said that it targeted a Hezbollah infrastructure site, targeting militants, weapons and tunnel shafts. One person was killed and eight others were injured.

=== 11 May ===
- Lebanese TV station Al Jadeed reported that Israeli fire injured two people in Maroun al-Ras.
- Lebanese media outlet Al Mayadeen reported that Israeli forces conducted an airstrike in an open area in the vicinity of Ayta ash-Shaab apparently to prevent residents from approaching the area.

=== 12 May ===
- UNIFIL said that it uncovered over 225 Hezbollah weapons caches since the beginning of the ceasefire.

=== 13 May ===
- An Israeli drone hit a motorcycle in the vicinity of Houla, Lebanon, killing one person. The IDF said that it targeted a Hezbollah militant.
- The IDF said that it hit a Hezbollah militant in Beaufort.

=== 14 May ===
- NNA reported that an Israeli drone hit a vehicle at the entrance to Wadi al-Hujeir in the vicinity of Qaaqaait al-Jisr, killing one person. The IDF said that a Hezbollah commander was killed in the strike.
- NNA reported that an Israeli drone crashed in Shebaa because of a technical malfunction, causing an explosion that damaged a home and inflicted "material losses".
- UNIFIL said that Israeli fire hit the perimeter of one of its bases in Kfar Shouba.

=== 15 May ===
- An Israeli drone hit a vehicle in south Lebanon. The IDF said that it killed a Hezbollah militant in Arnoun and accused him of involvement in restoring a Hezbollah infrastructure in the area.

=== 17 May ===
- One person was killed in an Israeli drone strike on a car in Tyre District. The IDF said that it killed a Hezbollah commander who was involved in restoring Hezbollah's capabilities in the Beaufort Castle area.

=== 18 May ===
- NNA reported that an Israeli drone hit a car in the vicinity of a Lebanese army checkpoint in Beit Yahoun, injuring two people including a Lebanese soldier.

=== 19 May ===
- One person was killed in an Israeli drone attack in Houla. The IDF said that it killed a Redwan force militant. Three people were injured in two other incidents in the vicinity of the border.

=== 20 May ===
- NNA reported that an Israeli drone strike on a motorcycle in the vicinity of Majdal Zoun killed one person and injured five others.
- NNA reported that firing from an Israeli drone hit fishermen in Ras an-Naqoura.
- The IDF said that it killed the commander of Hezbollah forces in Al-Mansouri in a drone strike.

=== 21 May ===
- Lebanese media reported that an Israeli drone strike hit a vehicle in Ain Baal. The IDF said that it killed a “an experienced engineer” in Hezbollah's weapons research and development division of Hezbollah.
- NNA reported that an Israeli drone attack hit Yatar, killing one person. The IDF said that it killed a commander of Hezbollah's Radwan force.

=== 22 May ===
- The IDF warned to stay away from a building in Toul, Lebanon, describing it as a Hezbollah facility. It later struck the building.
- NNA reported that an Israeli strike hit Rab Thalathin, killing one person. The IDF said that it killed a Redwan Force militant in a drone attack.
- NNA reported that Israeli firing injured a shepherd in Wazzani.
- The IDF said that it struck a Hezbollah facility used to store weapons in Beqaa Valley.
- NNA reported Israeli strikes in Soujod, Touline, Sawanna and the Rihan Mountain.
- Lebanese media reported that Israeli attacks targeted Wadi al-Aziya and Deir Intar. Israeli bombardment also hit two mobile houses in Shamaa.

=== 23 May ===
- The IDF said it hit 15 Hezbollah targets in Lebanon overnight.

=== 26 May ===
- Lebanese media reported an Israeli strike in the vicinity of Brital.
- Lebanese media reported that Israeli ground forces operated in the vicinity of Mais al-Jabal.

=== 27 May ===
- NNA reported that bulldozing operations were conducted by Israeli forces on the eastern outskirts of Mais al-Jabal.
- The IDF said that it killed a Radwan Force militant in a drone strike in Majdal Zoun one day prior.
- Lebanese media reported that one person was killed in an Israeli drone strike on a motorcycle in Yatar. The IDF said that it killed Hezbollah forces commander in Yatar and accused him of trying to restore Hezbollah's capabilities in the area.

=== 29 May ===
- An Israeli drone strike on the outskirts of Nabatieh al-Fawqa killed one person. The IDF said that it struck a Hezbollah militant in the vicinity of Beaufort Castle, Lebanon and accused him of trying to restore a major Hezbollah infrastructure in the area which had been struck several times in recent weeks. However, a Lebanese official said that a municipal worker was killed in the attack.
- NNA reported that a series of Israeli air strikes targeted areas in the vicinity of Beit Lif, Ramiyah, al-Bisariya, Wadi al-Safa and al-Sarira. The IDF said that it hit Hezbollah infrastructure in Lebanon.
- Lebanese media reported an Israeli attack in the vicinity of Bnafoul.
- Arab media reported that a second person was killed in an Israeli attack in south Lebanon.

=== 30 May ===
- The IDF said that it bombed a site used by Hezbollah to store weapons in Beqaa Valley and accused the group of attempting to restore the site.

=== 31 May ===
- NNA reported that an Israeli drone attack on a car in Deir ez-Zahrani killed a man. The IDF said that it killed a Hezbollah rocket commander in the Beaufort Castle area and accused him of trying to restore Hezbollah infrastructure.

== June 2025 ==
=== 1 June ===
- An Israeli drone strike hit a motorcycle in Arnoun, killing one person. The IDF said that it killed a militant from Hezbollah's anti-tank unit.
- An Israeli attack hit a car in Beit Lif, injuring one person.
- An Israeli strike hit a vehicle on Debl road of Bint Jbeil District, killing one person.
- The IDF said that its drone attack killed a militant from Hezbollah's rocket unit.

=== 5 June ===
- Lebanese media reported that an Israeli drone attack hit a vehicle in Qalaouiyeh, injuring one person.
- The IDF issued evacuation orders for four buildings and nearby areas in the southern suburbs of Beirut, saying that it will target Hezbollah "underground infrastructure". It later carried out the attacks.
- The IDF issued evacuation orders for two areas in Ain Qana, saying there are Hezbollah facilities in the area.

=== 8 June ===
- NNA reported that an Israeli drone strike hit a motorcycle on a road between Chehabiyeh and Kfar Dounin, in the vicinity of Tyre, killing one person.

=== 9 June ===
- Lebanese media reported that an Israel drone attack hit a car in Al-Numairiyah.

=== 10 June ===
- NNA reported that an Israeli drone strike in the vicinity of Shebaa, killed two people and injured another person. The IDF said that it killed a Hezbollah militant and a Lebanese Resistance Brigades militant and accused them of violating the ceasefire.

=== 11 June ===
- An Israeli drone attack hit a car in Beit Lif, killing at least one person and injuring three others. The IDF said that it killed a Radwan Force militant.

=== 12 June ===
- Lebanese media reported Israeli strikes in the vicinity of Al-Baisariyah and Tebna, south of Sidon.
- An Israeli drone strike hit a motorcycle in Nabatieh al-Fawqa, killing one person. NNA also reported several Israeli airstrikes throughout south Lebanon.

=== 18 June ===
- The IDF said that it killed a Hezbollah commander in a drone strike in Barish and accused him of trying to restore Hezbollah artillery.

=== 19 June ===
- The IDF said that it killed the commander of Hezbollah's anti-tank unit in Shebaa in a drone strike in south Lebanon and accused him of violating the ceasefire.
- Lebanese media reported that an Israeli drone attack hit a car near Houla, killing one person. The IDF said that it killed a Hezbollah militant involved in efforts to restore Hezbollah infrastructure in the area.

=== 20 June ===
- NNA reported that an Israeli drone targeted a car in Al-Aabbassiyah in Tyre District, killing one person.
- The IDF said that it killed the commander of Hezbollah's firepower unit in the Litani river area, in a drone strike in Shabriha in the vicinity of Tyre and accused him of violating the ceasefire.
- The IDF said that the IAF struck Hezbollah targets including rocket launchers and weapons caches in south Lebanon and accused the group of violating the ceasefire.

=== 21 June ===
- NNA reported that an Israeli drone attack hit a motorcycle in Baraachit, killing one person. The IDF said that it killed a Hezbollah militant.
- The IDF said that an Israeli naval vessel targeted a facility belonging to the Radwan Force in Naqoura after gathering intelligence including from the interrogation of an arrested Hezbollah militant.

=== 23 June ===
- NNA reported that Israeli air strikes hit the outskirts of several areas in southern Lebanon including Zrariyeh, Kfrar Milki and Ansar.
- The IDF said that it conducted strikes targeting Hezbollah military sites including rocket launchers and weapon depots north of the Litani River and accused the group of violating the ceasefire.

=== 24 June ===
- Lebanese media reported that an Israeli drone attack hit a car in the vicinity of Kfardajal, killing three people.

=== 25 June ===
- Lebanese media reported that an Israeli drone attack targeted the vicinity of Mansouri, injuring at least one person.

=== 26 June ===
- NNA reported that an Israeli drone strike on a motorcycle in Beit Lif killed two people. It also reported that several people were injured in a drone strike in Bint Jbeil. The IDF said that the it killed a Radwan Force commander and a militant from Hezbollah's observation unit in two strikes in south Lebanon.
- The IDF said that it destroyed a house in Houla and accused Hezbollah of using it to observe its forces.

=== 27 June ===
- The IDF said that it struck a Hezbollah infrastructure in Beaufort Castle area and accused the group of violating the ceasefire.
- Lebanese media reported that an Israeli drone strike hit an apartment in Nabatieh. The Lebanese Health Ministry said that a woman was killed while 13 others were injured. Officials also said that seven others were injured in Nabatieh's outskirts. The IDF blamed the explosion on a rocket that was launched during strikes on a nearby Hezbollah infrastructure and released a video that it says confirmed it.
- An Israeli attack in Shaqra wounded four people.

=== 28 June ===
- The IDF said that it killed a Hezbollah anti-tank commander in a strike in Kounin.
- The Lebanese Health Ministry said that an Israeli strike hit a motorcycle in Mahrouna, killing two people including a woman and injuring three others. The IDF said that it killed a Radwan Force intelligence operative involved in transferring weapons and accused him of violating the ceasefire.

=== 29 June ===
- Haaretz quoted reports of Israeli drone attacks on targets in north Lebanon, without adding further details.

== July 2025 ==
=== 1 July ===
- The Lebanese Health Ministry said that an Israeli drone strike hit a home on the road leading to Jabal al-Ahmar in Nabatieh District, slightly injuring two people including a child.

=== 3 July ===
- One person was killed while three others were injured in an IDF drone strike in Khalde.
- The IDF conducted extensive bombing in south Lebanon, saying that it conducted strikes on Hezbollah targets and accused the group of violating the ceasefire.

=== 5 July ===
- An Israeli strike hit a home in Shebaa, injuring one person.
- An Israeli strike hit a vehicle on a road leading to Bint Jbeil, killing one person and injuring two others.
- An Israeli strike hit a vehicle in Shaqra, injuring two people.
- An Israeli strike hit a car in Bint Jbeil, injuring one person.
- The IDF said that it killed a Radwan Force militant in Aynata.

=== 6 July ===
- Israeli strikes hit multiple areas throughout Lebanon. The IDF said that it conducted strikes against Hezbollah targets and accused the group of violating the ceasefire. At least 10 people were injured including a child.

=== 7 July ===
- NNA reported that an Israeli strike hit a motorcycle in Bint Jbeil District, killing one person.
- Lebanese Health Ministry said that an Israeli attack killed another person.

=== 8 July ===
- The IDF announced that it killed two Hezbollah militants including a Radwan Force commander in its strikes in south Lebanon one day prior.
- Al Jazeera reported that an Israeli strike hit a vehicle in Babliyah.
- An Israeli strike hit a car near Tripoli, killing three people. The IDF said it had killed Mehran Mustafa Ba'jur, a local Hamas commander.

=== 9 July ===
- The IDF announced that it killed Hezbollah's Badr Unit fire coordination head in the Zahrani sector in a strike in Babliyeh and accused him of violating the ceasefire.
- The IDF said that it raided and destroyed several Hezbollah infrastructure in southern Lebanon.

=== 10 July ===
- The IDF said that it struck a Hezbollah militant compound in Yohmor that "operated under the guise of a civilian structure".
- NNA reported that an Israeli strike hit a motorcycle in Al-Mansouri, killing one person and injuring another. The IDF said that it killed the Hezbollah artillery forces commander in south Lebanon's coastal sector and accused him of violating the ceasefire.

=== 11 July ===
- NNA reported that an Israeli strike hit a car in Nabatieh District, killing one person and injuring two others. The IDF and Shin Bet announced that it killed a militant involved in arms smuggling into Israel for militant attacks.

=== 12 July ===
- The IDF said that it killed a militant from Hezbollah's anti-tank unit in Khiam.

=== 15 July ===
- The IDF said that the IAF struck Redwan Force militant training camps in the Beqaa Valley, killing 12 people including seven Syrian nationals and five Hezbollah militants.
- Lebanon banned transactions with the Hezbollah-affiliated Al-Qard Al-Hasan Association.

=== 17 July ===
- Lebanese media reported that an Israeli attack hit a vehicle between Kfour and Toul, killing one man and injuring two others. The IDF said that it killed a Radwan Force naval force commander and accused him of violating the ceasefire.
- Lebanese media reported that an Israeli attack hit a truck in Naqoura. The IDF said that it killed a Hezbollah militant involved in restoring the group’s capabilities in the area and accused him of violating the ceasefire.

=== 19 July ===
- NNA reported that an Israeli strike hit Khiam, killing one person. The IDF said that it killed a Radwan Force militant and accused him of trying to restore Hezbollah infrastructure and violating the ceasefire.
- NNA reported that an Israeli strike hit a motorcycle in Yohmor al-Shaqif, killing one person. The IDF said that it killed a Hezbollah commander and accused him of involvement in efforts to restore Hezbollah infrastructure and violating the ceasefire.

=== 21 July ===
- NNA reported that an Israeli strike hit a motorcycle in at-Tiri, killing one person. The IDF said that it killed a Hezbollah militant involved in restoring the group's capabilities in Bint Jbeil.

=== 22 July ===
- NNA reported that an Israeli strike hit a car in Tibnin, killing one person.

=== 24 July ===
- The IDF said that the IAF killed a Hezbollah militant and struck several facilities in south Lebanon.

=== 25 July ===
- The IDF announced that it killed Hezbollah's chief of personnel for Bint Jbeil who it accused of involvement in efforts to restore the group's capabilities, recruit militants and violate the ceasefire.

=== 26 July ===
- Lebanese Health Ministry said that one person was killed in a strike in south Lebanon.

=== 27 July ===
- The IDF announced that it killed two Radwan Force militants in a strike in Debaal one day prior and accused them of involvement in efforts to restore the Radwan Force's capabilities, planning attacks and violating the ceasefire.

=== 28 July ===
- The IDF announced that the IAF killed a militant from Hezbollah's artillery array in a strike in Bint Jbeil.

=== 31 July ===
- Israeli strikes were reported by Lebanese media in the Bekaa Valley. The IDF said that it struck Hezbollah "strategic weapons" sites and accused the group of attempting to restore them and violating the ceasefire. Four people were killed in the strikes.

== August 2025 ==
=== 5 August ===
- Lebanese Prime Minister Nawaf Salam ordered the Lebanese Army to formulate a plan to monopolize weapons in Lebanon by end of 2025.
- Lebanese Health Ministry said that an Israeli drone attack hit a vehicle in Baalbek, killing one person.

=== 6 August ===
- The IDF said that it killed a Hezbollah militant who operated from Lebanon to direct militant cells in Syria. It also said that these militant cells planned to launch rockets attacks towards the Golan Heights.
- Lebanese media reported that a series of Israeli strikes hit south Lebanon. The IDF said that it targeted Hezbollah militant infrastructure sites and accused the group of using Lebanese population as human shields and violating ceasefire.

=== 7 August ===
- Lebanon’s National News Agency said that an Israeli airstrike near Masnaa killed six people, including Mohammed Wishah, a member of the central committee of the PFLP, and his bodyguard.

=== 8 August ===
- The IDF said that it killed the intelligence chief of Hezbollah's Radwan force in the vicinity of Adloun.

=== 12 August ===
- NNA reported an Israeli drone attack in the port area of Naqoura.

=== 14 August ===
- The IDF said that it struck Hezbollah underground infrastructure in south Lebanon and accused the group of violating the ceasefire.

=== 15 August ===
- The IDF said that it attacked a Hezbollah site in Beaufort Ridge after identifying "military activity" and accused the group of violating the ceasefire.

=== 20 August ===
- The IDF struck Hezbollah facilities in south Lebanon including a rocket launcher and weapons storage facilities.

=== 21 August ===
- The Lebanese Health Ministry said that an Israeli strike hit a motorcycle in Nabatieh Governorate, killing a man.

=== 22 August ===
- The IDF said that it killed a Hezbollah operative in Ayta ash-Shaab and accused him of trying to rehabilitate Hezbollah infrastructure.
- The IDF said that it struck a facility used by Hezbollah to store weapons in Deir Kifa.

=== 25 August ===
- The Lebanese Health Ministry said that an Israeli drone attack hit Tibnin, killing one person.

=== 28 August ===
- The IDF said that it struck multiple Hezbollah militant infrastructures, including a rocket launcher in south Lebanon and accused the group of violating the ceasefire. NNA reported that the strike in Qila injured one person.
- The Lebanese Army said that two soldiers were killed and two injured by an Israeli drone explosion in Ras al-Naqoura. The IDF expressed regret.

=== 31 August ===
- The IDF said that it attacked "underground Hezbollah infrastructure" in Beaufort Ridge and accused the group of violating the ceasefire.

== September 2025 ==
=== 3 September ===
- NNA reported that one person was killed in an Israeli drone attack in Yatar.
- The Lebanese Health Ministry said that an Israeli artillery fire killed another person in south Lebanon.

=== 8 September ===
- The Associated Press reported that Israeli strikes in northeastern Lebanon killed five people, including four Hezbollah militants.

=== 19 September ===
- The Lebanese Health Ministry reported that a man was killed and 11 others were injured by an Israeli airstrike on a vehicle outside of Tibnin Public Hospital while another attack on a vehicle in Ansar killed one person. The IDF said that it killed a Hezbollah commander in south Lebanon. It added that it killed a Radwan force militant in Tibnin, and attacked "a vessel that was used by Hezbollah to gather intelligence" on Israeli forces in Naqura.

=== 21 September ===
- Lebanon's health ministry said that an Israeli strike hit a motorbike and a vehicle in Bint Jbeil, killing five people including three children and injuring two others. The IDF said that one of those killed was a Hezbollah militant and it regrets any harm to uninvolved individuals.

=== 28 September ===
- The IDF said it destroyed several Hezbollah weapon repositories that violated the ceasefire agreement.

=== 30 September ===
- The IDF said that it killed two Hezbollah militants that were in charge of artillery in southern Lebanon, used rockets to attack Israel, and accused them of working on rebuilding militant infrastructure and attacks against its forces.

== October 2025 ==
=== 3 October ===
- The IDF said that a site that violated the ceasefire and posed a threat on Israel by managing Hezbollah's armed attacks and defenses, including weapons, structures used for militant activities, and underground infrastructures, were attacked in southern Lebanon.

=== 6 October ===
- Lebanese media reported that an Israeli drone strike in southern Lebanon killed two people including a woman. The IDF said that one of those killed was a leading Hezbollah militant and accused him of violating the ceasefire and playing a central role in rebuilding Hezbollah's air defenses.
- The IDF said that it attacked several Hezbollah targets in Beqaa including camps that were used for training militants.

=== 7 October ===
- The IDF said that it killed a Hezbollah militant whom it accused of taking over private properties from a Lebanese village in favor of militant activities that violate the ceasefire, such as storing weaponry and surveillance, and another Hezbollah militant whom it accused of rebuilding militant infrastructure using heavy equipment.

=== 11 October ===
- A large number of vehicles were destroyed and a Syrian national was killed and six others including two women were wounded during Israeli airstrikes on Msayleh. The IDF said it targeted Hezbollah sites storing heavy machinery used for rebuilding militant infrastructure.

=== 16 October ===
- Israeli airstrikes in Lebanon killed one person in Shmustar, injured six in Ansar, and injured a seventh in Bnaafoul. A Lebanese Army Intelligence source said that the IAF conducted 31 attacks against Hezbollah targets in east and south Lebanon.

=== 17 October ===
- The IDF said that it demolished a building used by Hezbollah in Yaroun.

=== 23 October ===
- Lebanese Health Ministry and NNA reported that Israeli strikes in eastern and southern Lebanon killed at least four people, including an elderly woman. The IDF said it had targeted Hezbollah sites in east and north Lebanon, including “a military camp and a site for the production of precision missiles” in the Bekaa Valley. It also stated that it targeted several militant targets, including a Hezbollah training camp and a “weapons storage facility” in the Nabatieh area.

=== 24 October ===
- L'Orient–Le Jour reported that an Israeli strike in Toul killed two people including a woman and injured two others. Among the dead was the logistics chief of Hezbollah's Southern Front, who the IDF accused of violating the ceasefire.

=== 25 October ===
- The Lebanese Health Ministry said that one person was killed and another was injured in a strike on a car in Harouf. The IDF said that it killed a commander in the Radwan Force's anti-tank missile unit who helped rebuild infrastructure in Jebchit.
- The IDF struck a car in Al-Qlailah, killing a commander in the Radwan special forces unit.

=== 26 October ===
- An Israeli strike in al-Hafir killed two people, including a Syrian national. The IDF said that it killed a Hezbollah member who was responsible for trafficking weapons from Syria to Lebanon.
- An Israeli airstrike in Naqoura killed one person, who the IDF said was Hezbollah's representative to Ras Biyyada.

=== 29 October ===
- The IDF said that it killed a Hezbollah's logistics chief in Qana, who it accused of helping rebuild infrastructure, in a strike on 14 October.
- The IDF said that it bombed a Hezbollah tunnel and rocket launcher in Mahmudiyah.

=== 30 October ===
- Israeli forces raided the Blida town hall, killing a municipal worker. The IDF said that it was dismantling Hezbollah infrastructure.

=== 31 October ===
- The IDF said that it struck and killed a Hezbollah maintenance officer who was rebuilding militant infrastructure in Kounin.
- The IDF said that it killed a Radwan Force member who planned attacks on Israel and helped restore Hezbollah infrastructure in a drone strike in Nabatieh.

== November 2025 ==
=== 1 November ===
- An Israeli strike hit a car in Nabatieh District, killing four people and injuring three people. The IDF said that those killed were Redwan Force militants.

=== 3 November ===
- The IDF said that it killed a militant of the Radwan Force in an airstrike in Nabatieh. It later conducted a separate strike in Ayta ash-Shaab, killing an alleged Hezbollah militant who was surveilling Israeli soldiers.

=== 5 November ===
- An Israeli strike on a car in Burj Rahal killed one person and injured another. The IDF said that it killed a Radwan Force militant who was behind attacks on Israel.

=== 6 November ===
- An Israeli airstrike between Toura and Al-Aabbassiyah, Tyre District, killed one person and injured three others. The IDF said that it targeted militants of Hezbollah's construction unit.
- The IDF said that it carried out strikes on infrastructure and arms depots belonging to the Radwan Force in several towns in southern Lebanon. The Lebanese Health Ministry said that one person was injured.

=== 8 November ===
- Two brothers were killed in an Israeli airstrike near Shebaa. The IDF said that they were arms smugglers belonging to the Hezbollah-allied Lebanese Resistance Brigades.
- An Israeli drone strike on a car near a hospital in Bint Jbeil injured seven people.
- An Israeli strike in Baraashit killed one person and injured four others. The IDF said that it conducted a drone strike that killed a Hezbollah militant who it accused of attempting to rebuild militant infrastructure.

=== 9 November ===
- The IDF said that it conducted strikes in Houmine El Faouqa and as-Sawana, killing two Hezbollah militants.

=== 10 November ===
- Israel conducted a wave of strikes in southern and eastern Lebanon. The IDF said that it struck a rocket launching site in the south, several sites in Nabatieh, and weapons storage and manufacturing sites in the Beqaa Valley. A strike targeting a car on a highway in Al-Baisariyah killed one person, who the IDF said was a Hezbollah arms smuggler.

=== 13 November ===
- The IDF said that it struck Hezbollah sites in southern Lebanon that were located near civilian areas.

=== 14 November ===
- Lebanon imposed more stringent regulations on money changers and transfer companies as part of efforts to stop Hezbollah funding.

=== 16 November ===
- The IDF said that it killed a Hezbollah militant in Al-Mansouri.

=== 18 November ===
- The IDF said that it killed a Hezbollah militant in Bint Jbeil and another Hezbollah militant in Blida.

=== 19 November ===
- Lebanese media reported that an Israeli attack targeted a car in at-Tiri, killing one person and injuring 11. The reports said that a school bus passed by the area at the time of the attack, resulting in the wounding of the driver and several children.
- The IDF carried out a wave of strikes in several towns in southern Lebanon, targeting what it said were arms depots belonging to Hezbollah's rocket unit.

=== 21 November ===
- The IDF said that it killed a Hezbollah member near Froun.

=== 22 November ===
- Lebanon's health ministry said that an Israeli strike on a car in Zawtar al-Sharqiyah killed one person, while a separate drone attack in Shaqra injured five others. The IDF later said that it conducted strikes in Mayfadoun and Houla, killing two Hezbollah militants.
- The IDF said that it struck Hezbollah rocket launchers in southern Lebanon and two militant sites in the Beqaa Valley.

=== 23 November ===
- The Lebanese Health Ministry said that least five people were killed and 25 others were injured in an Israeli strike on the fourth floor of an apartment building in Beirut's Haret Hreik neighborhood. Israeli forces said it targeted Hezbollah's chief of staff, Haytham Ali Tabatabai. Hezbollah confirmed that Tabatabai was killed alongside four other militants.

=== 27 November ===
- The IDF said that it conducted strikes on several Hezbollah sites in southern Lebanon, including arms facilities and outposts.

== December 2025 ==
=== 8 December ===
- The IDF said that it struck Hezbollah militant infrastructure in southern Lebanon, including a training site used by the Radwan Force.

=== 9 December ===
- UNIFIL stated that its observers came under fire during a patrol in the Blue Line near the village of Sarda. No injuries were reported. The IDF said that it warned a suspect approaching its forces stationed inside south Lebanon.

=== 14 December ===
- The IDF said that it carried three separate drone strikes targeting Hezbollah members in Yatar, Bint Jbeil, and Jwaya, killing three militants whom it accused of violating the truce.

=== 16 December ===
- The IDF said that it struck two Hezbollah militants separately in Taybeh and Sebline.

=== 21 December ===
- The IDF said that it conducted separate strikes against two Hezbollah militants in the Yatar area.

=== 22 December ===
- An Israeli attack hit a car on the Aqtnit–Qantara road in Sidon District, killing three people, including a Lebanese soldier. The IDF said that it had attacked several Hezbollah militants in the Sidon area. However, Lebanon denied that the deceased soldier had links to the group.

=== 25 December ===
- The IDF said that they killed a senior militant of the Iranian Quds Force's Unit 840 named Hussein Mahmoud Marshad al-Jawhari in an attack in Lebanon.
- The IDF said that it killed a Hezbollah militant involved in rebuilding infrastructure near al-Jumayjimah.

== January 2026 ==
=== 4 January ===
- The IDF said that it killed two Hezbollah militants in al-Jumayjimah, accusing them of violating the truce.

=== 5 January ===
- The IDF said that it struck several Hezbollah militant infrastructure sites in eastern and southern Lebanon.

=== 6 January ===
- The IDF said that it killed two Hezbollah militants near Kherbet Selem and accused them of violating the ceasefire. The Lebanese Health Ministry said that another person was seriously wounded in the strike.

=== 7 January ===
- The IDF said it killed a militant from Hezbollah's Unit 127 in Jwaya whom it accused of violating the truce.

=== 8 January ===
- The Lebanese army claimed that it had "effectively and tangibly" achieved the aim of a state monopoly on weapons in the south Lebanon, but that additional work needed to be done to remove tunnels and unexploded ordnance.
- The IDF said it killed a Hezbollah drone operator in Zaita and accused him of violating the ceasefire.

=== 11 January ===
- The IDF said that it struck Hezbollah weapon storage sites in several areas in southern Lebanon and killed a militant near Bint Jbeil.

=== 21 January ===
- SOHR reported that the IDF carried out airstrikes on four crossing points on the Syria-Lebanon border used for smuggling operations and transporting arms to Hezbollah, killing a weapons dealer.

=== 26 January ===
- Hezbollah said that a presenter for its Al-Manar television channel was killed in an Israeli airstrike in Tyre. The IDF said that he was also a Hezbollah militant who was violating the truce by working to rehabilitate artillery capabilities of the group in south Lebanon.

=== 30 January ===
- The IDF said that it killed a Hezbollah militant whom it accused of violating the truce by attempting to restore the group's military infrastructure in south Lebanon.
- The IDF said that it is striking Hezbollah infrastructure in south Lebanon as a response to the group's alleged violation of the truce.

== February 2026 ==
=== 2 February ===
- The IDF said that it targeted a Hezbollah militant in Harouf and accused the group of violating the truce.
- The IDF said that it targeted a Hezbollah militant in Ansariyah.
- Evacuation notices were issued by the IDF for two villages in south Lebanon, saying that they are situated in the vicinity of buildings used by Hezbollah as "military infrastructure." It later said that it attacked facilities used by Hezbollah to store arms and accused that one of those facilities were situated in the heart of a civilian area.

=== 9 February ===
- Lebanon’s Health Ministry said that an Israeli drone hit a car in Yanouh, killing three people including a three-year-old child. The IDF said that it targeted a Hezbollah artillery official and accused him of violating the truce.
- An Al-Jama'a al-Islamiyya militant was captured by the IDF from Hebbarieh.
- One person was killed by Israeli gunfire in Aita al-Shaab. The IDF said that it killed a Hezbollah militant and accused him of violating the truce.

=== 16 February ===
- Four people, including a Syrian national, were killed in an Israeli airstrike on a vehicle in Majdal Anjar. The IDF said it targeted militants from the PIJ in Lebanon.

=== 20 February ===
- Lebanon's Health Ministry, Lebanese media and security sources said that Israeli airstrikes in the Beqaa Valley killed 10 people and injured 50 others — including three children. Hezbollah confirmed the death of its eight militants including a senior commander in the strikes. The IDF said that it targeted Hezbollah command centers belonging to its missile force in Beqaa Valley and accused the militant group of violating the truce, saying that the facility was situated in the heart of a civilian area. A separate strike in Ain al-Hilweh camp killed two and injured one, which the IDF said targeted a Hamas command center and accused the militant group of violating the truce, saying that the facility was situated in the heart of a civilian area. Hamas confirmed that two of its members had been killed in the attack but said the targeted building belonged to a combined security unit made up of numerous Palestinian factions which is responsible with maintaining security in the camp.

=== 26 February ===
- Lebanon's Health Ministry and NNA reported that Israeli strikes in Beqaa Valley killed a 16-year-old Syrian boy and injured 29 others. The IDF said that it targeted eight Radwan Force militant compounds in Baalbek used for storing arms and training and accused the group of violating the truce.
