= Ramiz Rizq =

Lebanese writer

- Born: 1954 (age 71–72); Meiss ej-Jabal, Lebanon
- Education: Lebanese University The University of Sydney
- Years active: 1974–present

Ramiz Rizq is a Lebanese writer born in 1954, in the town of Meiss ej-Jabal, south of Lebanon. His literary works often focused on his birth town, as he published many books about Meiss ej-Jabal. He has also published three novels and two collections of short stories, as well as a book that studies the development of Imami Shiite jurisprudence and ideologies under the title A Reading in the History of Imami Jurisprudence.

== Early life and education ==
Ramiz Rizq was born in 1954 in the town of Meiss Ej-Jabal, south Lebanon. Ramiz Rizq received his primary education in Meiss Ej-Jabal school. He then obtained a license in primary education from Dar al-Muailimeen in Nabatieh in 1975. Later on in 1981, he obtained a license from the Faculty of Arts at the Lebanese University. In 1988, he left Lebanon and went to Australia where he obtained a master's degree in philosophy from the University of Sydney in the year 2000.

== Career ==
Ramiz Rizq's first book Amiliyat was published in 2001 and it represented his first literary production in this field as it was a collection of short stories from Jabal Amel, Southern Lebanon. In 2005, he published two history books, Meiss ej-Jabal: The Pearl of Jabal Amel and Jabal AMel History and Events. In 2012, he published, A Reading into The History of Imami Jurisprudence which studies the development of Imami Shiite jurisprudence and its ideologies.

Over the years, Rizq continued his literary production. He published a short story collection Amiliyat (2) which was a sequel to the first book Amiliyat. Rizq had also published three long novels, The Lebanese Abdo Elias, On the Edge of The Cliff and, Malik Mokhtar. The events that take place in Malik Mokhtar portray the customs, traditions and social frameworks of the Lebanese countryside, all of which impose the implementation of parents orders when it comes to important matters like marriage, in which the children must listen and obey. Rizq azanlyzes this type of relationship through his main character Malik and the other characters associated with him. It is a story in which kindness is mixed with abuse, regret with bitterness and guilt with remorse.

== Quotes ==
He wrote in his book Qirā’ah fī tārīkh al-fiqh al-Imāmī wa-taṭawwurih that "It is an accepted and an undisputed fact, amongst the Imamiyyah scholars, that none of the 12 Imams left behind any book on Fiqh which one can resort to. As for those books which are attributed to some of the Imams, their authenticity is not proven. The controversy surrounding this has continued without the disputing parties coming to a clear intellectual conclusion. Therefore, the discussion about the importance of the Imams and their role in the emergence of Fiqh is a natural thing. However, to ascertain the authenticity of all that which is attributed to the Imams, is a relative matter, dependent on the honesty and integrity of the narrators."

== Works ==
- Amiliyat (2 parts)
- Meiss ej-Jabal: The Pearl of Jabal Amel
- Jabal Amel History and Events
- A reading into the History of Imami Jurisprudence
- The Lebanese Abdo Elias
- On the Edge of The Cliff
- Malik Mokhtar
