= Amal Khalil =

Lebanese journalist (1984–2026)

- آمال خليل
- Born: 1984; Al-Baisariyah, Sidon District, Lebanon
- Died: 22 April 2026 (aged 41–42); Southern Lebanon
- Cause of death: Killed in an Israeli airstrike (2026 Lebanon war)
- Citizenship: Lebanese
- Occupations: Journalist, reporter
- Years active: 2006–2026
- Employer: Al Akhbar (Lebanese daily newspaper)
- Known for: Coverage of Southern Lebanon, Israel-Hezbollah conflict

Amal Khalil (Arabic: آمال خليل; 1984 – 22 April 2026) was a Lebanese journalist for Al-Akhbar, a Lebanese newspaper. She was killed in Southern Lebanon while covering the 2026 Lebanon war, when a third Israeli strike within about two hours destroyed the building in which she and fellow journalist Zeinab Faraj had taken shelter. Rescuers were unable to reach Khalil for several hours, after a quadcopter reportedly dropped a stun grenade near a Lebanese Red Cross team and gunfire damaged the ambulance.

In August 2026, investigations by Human Rights Watch, Amnesty International and The Legal Agenda identified Khalil and Faraj as civilians and described the attacks as warranting investigation as possible war crimes.

Khalil was the ninth journalist killed in Lebanon in 2026.

== Early life and career ==
Khalil was from Al-Baisariyah, a coastal village in Sidon District, Lebanon in 1984. She studied Arabic literature in Sidon after her father prevented her from studying journalism at the Lebanese University in Beirut. She began writing for Al Hasnaa magazine and later joined Shabab Assafir, a weekly youth supplement of As-Safir, before becoming one of Al Akhbar's early journalists in 2006. Initially assigned to social affairs, she became the newspaper’s correspondent in Tyre after the 2006 Lebanon War.

By 2011, she was covering southern Lebanon more broadly, specialising in UNIFIL, Palestinian camps, Hezbollah, and the Lebanese Army, drawing on her own left-wing, anti-Zionist worldview, by her own account. Shortly before her death, Khalil had reported on the Israeli demolition of Lebanese homes in villages where Israeli troops remained stationed.

In September 2024, her family home was hit during an Israeli raid. That same month, Khalil told Al Jadeed that she received a threatening phone call from an Israeli phone number "warning her to leave the south and threatening to destroy her home and decapitate her". After her death, Israeli commentator Gideon Gal Ben Avraham was identified as the person who made this phone call.

== 2026 Israeli airstrike and death ==
On 22 April 2026, Khalil and freelance photojournalist Zeinab Faraj travelled to At-Tiri in southern Lebanon to report on the 2026 Lebanon war and verify claims that Israeli forces had withdrawn from the area. They were travelling behind a car carrying Ali Nabil Bazzi, a municipal official from Bint Jbeil, and Mohammed al-Hourani, a friend of Bint Jbeil's mayor. At about 2:30 p.m., an Israeli strike hit the men's car, killing both of them.

Khalil and Faraj left their vehicle and sheltered by a nearby building. Khalil telephoned the Lebanese Civil Defense to ask for help. At 3:00 p.m., the United Nations Interim Force in Lebanon forwarded to the Israeli military a request from the Lebanese Red Cross for access to rescue the journalists. According to Human Rights Watch, Israeli quadcopter drones hovered above Khalil and Faraj while they waited. Between 3:21 and 3:42 p.m., a second strike hit their abandoned car a short distance from where they were sheltering, wounding Khalil. The journalists then moved inside the building. Khalil remained in telephone contact with relatives, journalists and emergency workers while the Lebanese Red Cross and other responders sought Israeli permission to enter the area. At approximately 4:25 p.m., a third Israeli strike destroyed the building where the two women were hiding, trapping them beneath the rubble. According to Reporters Without Borders, the journalists had already been identified through the ceasefire monitoring mechanism before the strike on the building.

Lebanese Red Cross workers entered At-Tiri at about 5:00 p.m. and extracted Faraj, who had sustained serious injuries. According to Faraj, the Lebanese Health Ministry and other sources, a quadcopter then dropped a stun grenade near the rescuers, forcing them to withdraw without reaching Khalil. Witnesses also heard bursts of gunfire. Paramedics discovered two holes in one ambulance only after reaching the hospital and could not say precisely when it had been struck. Human Rights Watch considered the damage consistent with small-arms fire but could not establish the exact position of the forces responsible.

The Israeli military authorised rescue workers to return later that evening, and Khalil's body was recovered at about 11:00 p.m. A report from Tebnin Governmental Hospital stated that she had suffered a head injury causing severe bleeding and had died of cardiac arrest at approximately 7:00 p.m. Human Rights Watch concluded that Khalil was probably still alive when the rescuers were forced to withdraw.

The Israeli military said that the two vehicles had emerged from a structure used by Hezbollah and approached its forces in a way that posed an immediate threat. It also denied preventing rescuers from reaching the area and said that the incident was under investigation. Human Rights Watch said that it found no evidence that Bazzi or al-Hourani were fighters, and noted that the Israeli military provided only a brief response to its inquiries and did not answer subsequent questions. A funeral was later held on 23 April at her birthplace, Bissariyeh, and Khalil's body was later buried at the village's local cemetery.

=== Reactions and investigations ===
On 22 April 2026, as efforts to reach the journalists were underway, Lebanese president Joseph Aoun called on the Lebanese Red Cross to coordinate with the Lebanese Army and the United Nations peacekeeping force to rescue Khalil and Faraj. Aoun also expressed his condolences on X and called the attack as a deliberate way by Israel to conceal its actions in Lebanon as well as a "crime against humanity". Prime Minister Nawaf Salam accused Israel of war crimes, saying on X that targeting journalists and repeatedly obstructing rescuers constituted war crimes. The Health Ministry of Lebanon also condemned the attack, stating that Khalil's death "adds to the long list of crimes committed by the Israeli enemy against civilians, including journalists and paramedics, demonstrating its blatant disregard for laws and human values."

On the same day, the Committee to Protect Journalists accused Israeli forces of apparently targeting Khalil and Faraj and called for their rescue. Lebanon's Press Club said that Khalil was killed "while she was carrying out her journalistic work, paying with her life and blood for a cause she believed in."

In August 2026, Human Rights Watch, Amnesty International and The Legal Agenda published investigations that identified Khalil and Faraj as civilians and said that the circumstances warranted investigations into possible war crimes. Human Rights Watch said that photographs and videos, witness accounts and telephone records showed that the journalists' civilian status should have been apparent to the Israeli military before the later strikes. It added that restrictions on entry to the area did not deprive them of civilian protection. Amnesty International's Heba Morayef said that impunity for previous killings of journalists and other civilians in Lebanon had enabled further unlawful attacks, and called for an arms embargo on Israel.

== See also ==
- Attacks on journalists during the Israel–Hezbollah conflict (2023–present)
- Israeli war crimes
- List of journalists killed in the Gaza war
