= Ali Al-Kourani =

Lebanese Shia cleric (1944–2024)

Ali al-Kourani
- علي الكوراني
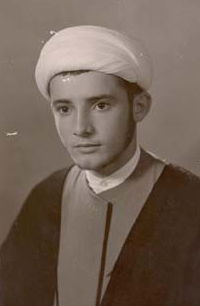
- Al-Kourani as a young man

Personal life
- Born: 22 November 1944 Yatar, Lebanon
- Died: 19 May 2024 (aged 79) Qom, Iran
- Region: Iraq – Lebanon
- Relatives: Hossein al-Korani (brother)

Religious life
- Religion: Islam
- Denomination: Twelver Shi'a
- Jurisprudence: Ja`fari
- Profession: Muslim scholar

Muslim leader
- Influenced by: Khoei, Baqir al-Sadr
- Website: alameli.net

Ali al-Kourani (Arabic: علي الكوراني; 22 November 1944 – 19 May 2024) was a Lebanese Shia scholar cleric. He was born in 1944 in Yatar (Lebanon) In Jabal Amel, migrating to Najaf, Iraq to study in a hawza in 1958.

In 1967, Grand Ayatollah Muhsin al-Hakim sent him to Kuwait to educate Shia people. He returned to Lebanon in 1974, and established a mosque and a hospital. He lived in Lebanon until 1980. After the Islamic Revolution in Iran, he moved to Qom, Iran. He established the Centre of the Encyclopaedia of Islamic Jurisprudence (Arabic: معجم فقهى) and the Mustafa Centre for Religious Studies (Arabic: مرکز المصطفى للدراسات الدینیه) in Qom.

Al-Kourani died from a heart attack in Qom on 19 May 2024 at the age of 79.

== His teachers ==
- Grand Ayatollah Muhsin al-Hakim
- Grand Ayatollah Abu al-Qasim al-Khoei
- Grand Ayatollah Mohammad Baqir al-Sadr
- Grand Ayatollah Mohammad Saeed Al-Hakim

== Research ==
Most of his research in hadiths is focused on Imam Mahdi, his appearance and the circumstances of the world before his coming. In his last years, he was frequently interviewed in Shia communities for providing political analysis of Middle East developments in the light of End Time Hadiths. He believed that according to prophecies the recent events in the Mid-East are a prelude to Imam Mahdi's appearance. For example, he held that the creation of a group which closely resembles ISIS had been prophesied in Shia narrations, particularly in a hadith from Ali ibn Abi Talib. As for Mahdi's utopian government, he stressed that it would be incomparable to existing governments of the world.

== Books ==
He wrote many books, many of them listed below:

- Epoch of Appearance (Arabic: عصرالظهور) is Ali Al-Kourani's most famous book. This book is written in Arabic, and is about the events that occur before the appearance of Imam Mahdi in Shia beliefs. In this book he describes the fate of nations and ethnicities, such as Iran, Yemen, Egypt, Iraq, Romans, Turks, Jews and Arabs in the End time according to the Shia and Sunni narrations. Also in a part of the book he mentions a Sunni viewpoint about Imam Mahdi.
- Smoothing of Appearance of Mahdi (Arabic: الممهدون للمهدی)
- Saint Peter in Islamic Narrations (Arabic: شمعون الصفا وصي المسيح(ع) وجد الإمام المهدي(ع)لأمه)
- Imam Hasan al-Askari Father of Imam Mahdi (Arabic: الإمام الحسن العسكري(ع) والد الإمام المهدي الموعود)
- Questions About Mahdaviat (Arabic: أسئلةٌ مهدوية)
- To Know and Love Allah Almighty (Arabic: في معرفة الله تعالى وحبه عز وجل)
- Answer to the Suspicion of Sheikh and Sayed in the Vision of Imam al-Mahdi (Arabic: جواب على شبهة شيخ وسيد في رؤية الإمام المهدي)
- Description of Al-Yasin Prayer (Arabic: شرح زيارة آل ياسين)
- Life of Imam Ali al-Hadi is Full of Jihad and Miracles (Arabic: الإمام علي الهادي (ع) عمر حافل بالجهاد والمعجزات)
- Vocabulary Words of the Quran Raghib Isfahani with Notes (Arabic: مفردات ألفاظ القرآن للراغب الاصفهاني مع ملاحظات)
- Imam Muhammad al-Jawad
- Dajjal of Basra
- Three Births (Arabic: الولادات الثلاث)
- Egypt and Ahl Al-Bayt
- New Reading About Islamic Conquests (Arabic: قراءاة جديد للفتوحات الاسلامية)(Two volumes)
- Reading the New Wars of Apostasy (Arabic: قراءة جديدة لحروب الردة)
- Islamic Beliefs (Arabic: العقائد الإسلامية) (Five volumes)
- The Victory (Arabic: الانتصار) (Nine volumes)
- Jewel of History (Arabic: جواهر التاريخ)
- The Thousand Questions and Forms on the Violators of the Ahl Al-Bayt (Arabic: ألف سؤال واشكال على المخالفين لأهل البيت الطاهرين)(Three volumes)
- The Knowledge of Allah (Arabic: معرفه الله)
- Codification of the Quran (Arabic: تدوين القرآن)
- The Lexicon Substantive Ahadith of Imam Mahdi (Arabic: المعجم الموضوعي لأحاديث الإمام المهدي عليه السلام)
- How Shias Responded to the Mongol Invasion (Arabic: كيف ردَّ الشيعة غزو المغول)
- Quran of Ali
- Interpretation of the Three Verses of Ghadir (Arabic: تفسير آيات الغدير الثلاث)
- The Quraysh Conflict with the Prophet (Arabic: صراع قريش مع النبي)
- In Search of Light (Arabic: بحـثـاً عـن النــور)
- Tidings of the Prophet To Twelve Imams (Arabic: بشارة النبي (ص) بالأئمة الإثني عشر)
- The Book of Truth is Set Forth in the Knowledge of the Infallible (Arabic: کتاب الحق المبين في معرفة المعصومين)
- Response to Extremist Fatwas (Arabic: الرد على الفتاوى المتطرفة)
- Verses of Qadir
- From Prayers of Prophet (Arabic: من أدعية الحبيب المصطفى)
- Human Rights at the Ahl Al-Bayt (Arabic: حقوق الإنسان عند أهل البيت)
- Point of View About Marja' (Arabic: نظرات الى المرجعية)
- A Book About Ahmad Al-Katib (Arabic: الموظف الدولي)
- Rosary of Karbala (Arabic: سبحة كربلاء)
- What is Narrated in Oversight of the Prophet and His Sleep (Arabic: ما رُوِيَ في سهو النبي صلى الله عليه وآله ونومه)
- Fruits of Ideas (Arabic: ثمار الأفكار)
- Ali al-Akbar ibn Husayn Was Similar to His Grandfather Mustafa
- Islamic Unity from the Viewpoint of the Ahl Al-Bayt (Arabic: الوحـدة الإسلاميـة من وجهـة نظـر أهل البيت)
- Write Down on My Winding Sheet (Arabic: أكتبوا على كفني)
- Sirah Rasul Allah Among Ahl Al-Bayt (Three volumes)
- Epoch of Shia
- Imam Musa al-Kadhim the Lord of Baghdad
- To the Seeker of Knowledge (His Biography) (Arabic: إلى طالب العلم)
- Arab Tribal Series in Iraq (Arabic: سلسلة القبائل العربية في العراق) (Ten volumes)
- Pearls of Grammar (Arabic: دُرَرُ النَّحْو)

== See also ==
- List of Shia Muslim scholars of Islam
