= Majdal Zoun =

Majdal Zoun مجدل زون
- Municipality
- Location within Lebanon
- Coordinates: 33.1519°N 35.2275°E
- Grid position: 171/283 PAL
- Country: Lebanon
- Governorate: South Governorate
- District: Tyre

Population
  - Estimate (2024): 4,500

Majdal Zoun or Majdalzoun (Arabic: مجدل زون) is a municipality in the Tyre district of Southern Lebanon.

The total population of the town is about 4500, who work predominantly in agriculture. The municipality was established in 2004.

In 2026 the village was mostly destroyed in a large explosion detonated by the Israeli Defense Forces.

== History ==
=== Ottoman era ===
In 1596, it was named as a village, Majdal Zurayd, in the Ottoman nahiya (subdistrict) of Tibnin under the liwa' (district) of Safad, with a population of 5 households, all Muslim. The villagers paid a fixed tax-rate of 25% on agricultural products, such as wheat, barley, fruit trees, goats & beehives; in addition to occasional revenues and a tax on winter pastures; a total of 3,100 akçe.

In 1881, the village was described under the name El Mejdel ("The watch-tower") in the PEF's Survey of Western Palestine (SWP) as "A large and conspicuous village, containing about 400 Moslems ; it is situated on a hill, with figs, olives, and arable land. The water from birket; there are two cisterns in village."

=== Modern era ===
Situated near the Israeli–Lebanese border, the town has been the target of numerous Israeli airstrikes throughout the conflict since 2023. The Israel Defense Forces killed eight people in an air raid on the village on April 28. In June 2026, Israeli forces claimed to have discovered an underground tunnel in the village used by Hezbollah for weapon depots. On June 29, the Israel Defense Forces detonated explosives in Majdal Zoun, causing extensive destruction and reportedly splitting the village in two.

== Demographics ==
In 2014 Muslims made up 99.96% of registered voters in Majdal Zoun. 99.53% of the voters were Shiite Muslims.

== Bibliography ==
- Conder, C.R.; Kitchener, H.H. (1881). The Survey of Western Palestine: Memoirs of the Topography, Orography, Hydrography, and Archaeology. Vol. 1. London: Committee of the Palestine Exploration Fund.
- Hütteroth, W.-D.; Abdulfattah, K. (1977). Historical Geography of Palestine, Transjordan and Southern Syria in the Late 16th Century. Erlanger Geographische Arbeiten, Sonderband 5. Erlangen, Germany: Vorstand der Fränkischen Geographischen Gesellschaft. ISBN 3-920405-41-2.
- Palmer, E.H. (1881). The Survey of Western Palestine: Arabic and English Name Lists Collected During the Survey by Lieutenants Conder and Kitchener, R. E. Transliterated and Explained by E.H. Palmer. Committee of the Palestine Exploration Fund.
- Rhode, H. (1979). Administration and Population of the Sancak of Safed in the Sixteenth Century. Columbia University. Archived from the original on 2020-03-01.
