= Hossein Korani Ameli =

Shia cleric

Hujjat al-Islam wa l-Muslimīn (Authority on Islam and Muslims) Hossein Korani Ameli

Personal life
- Born: Hossein Korani Ameli; 1955 Yater village, in area of Jabal Amel, Southern Lebanon
- Died: 2019 (aged 64)
- Region: Iran - Iraq - Lebanon

Religious life
- Religion: Islam
- Sect: Shia, Twelver
- Profession: Muslim scholar

Muslim leader
- Influenced by: Baqir al-Sadr

Hossein Korani Ameli (Hossein al-Korani al-Ameli or Ḥusayn Kūrānī or in Arabic: حسین الکورانی العاملی) was a Lebanese Shiite-Muslim cleric, one of the founders of Hezbollah in Lebanon and members of the Lebanese Hezbollah leadership council. He was the brother of Ali Al-Kourani.

== Early life ==
Hujjat al-Islam wa l-Muslimīn Sheikh Hossein Korani Ameli was born in Yater village in Jabal Amel in southern Lebanon.

== Studying in Najaf and Qom ==
He went to Najaf, Iraq at the age of thirteen to study religious sciences. After a while he went to Qom, Iran and stayed there for about a year and was influenced by Imam Khomeini and the Islamic Revolution of Iran.

== Return to Lebanon ==
When he was in Iran, the Pahlavi dynasty imperial regime expelled him from Iran because of his influence from Imam Khomeini and his activities about Islamic Revolution of Iran. After being deported from Iran, Sheikh Hossein Korani Ameli with Abbas al-Musawi taught religious sciences and Persian language in the Imam al-Montazer seminary of Baalbek, Lebanon.

== Iranian Revolution and return to Iran ==
After the Iranian Revolution, he returned to Iran. Korani had been managing Ahwaz's Arab Radio for a while, and after starting up Arab Radio in Tehran, he worked for the Arab section of Islamic Republic of Iran Broadcasting.

== Return to Lebanon again ==
He stayed in Tehran until year 1986 and then returned to Lebanon for religious activities and promotions. When he returned to Lebanon, began to set up an Islamic center in Lebanon with the aim of publishing authentic Islamic culture and publishing his propaganda activities in Lebanon's Sha'a'ir magazine monthly.

== Death ==
Hujjat al-Islam wa l-Muslimīn Sheikh Hossein Korani Ameli, one of the founders of Hezbollah, Lebanon, died on Thursday evening, September 12, 2019, at age 64 due to cancer. He died after suffering eight months of illness. He was buried in Qom and in the Fatima Masumeh Shrine.

Following his death, Lebanon's Hezbollah, Mohammad Yazdi on behalf of Society of Seminary Teachers of Qom, Yahya Rahim Safavi, Ebrahim Raisi and Ali Akbar Salehi issued messages.

== Books ==
He has written many books, many of them listed below:

- Fī miḥrāb Fāṭimah al-Zahrāʼ (Arabic: في محراب فاطمة الزهراء)
- The infallible and the text By Ḥusayn Kūrānī; Randa Farhat; Yasin Othman; Aḥmad Mawṣililī
- al-Karāmāt al-ghaybīyah lil-Imām al-Khumaynī
- Between modernity and eternity
- Fī al-manhaj : al-maʻṣūm-- wa-al-naṣṣ-- (Arabic: في المنهج : المعصوم-- والنص)
- Maqāṣid al-Basmalah : khamsūn maqālah fī al-ʻibādah wa-al-akhlāq wa-al-siyāsah al-fāḍilah (Arabic: مقاصد البسملة : خمسون مقالة في العبادة و الأخلاق و السياسة الفاضلة)
- Maʻālim al-nahj : nahj al-Imām al-Khumaynī : al-usus wa-al-maʻālim : usus wa-maʻālim li-nahj al-Imām al-Khumaynī al-muqaddas ulqiyat ʻalá majāmīʻ min al-shabāb wa-al-jāmiʻīyīn By Alī Māḥūzī; Ḥusayn Kūrānī (Arabic: معالم النهج : نهج الامام الخميني : الاسس والمعالم : اسس ومعال لنهج الامام الخميني المقدس القيت على مجاميع من الشباب والجامعيين)
- Ādāb ʻaṣr al-ghaybah
- al-Ǧihād al-akbar By Rūḥ Allāh K̲umaynī; Ḥusayn Kūrānī
- Fī al-manhaj
- Turbat Karbalāʼ : al-ḥudūd wa-al-asrār (Arabic: تربة كربلاء : الحدود و الأسرار)
- Ḥawla ruʼyah al-Mahdī al-muntaẓar
- Lamaḥāt min ḥayāt al-anbiyāʼ wa-al-mursalīn By Afāf Hādī Ṣūṣ; Ḥusayn Kūrānī (Arabic: لمحات من حياة الأنبياء والمرسلين)
- Ruʼyat al-Mahdī al-Muntaẓar : baḥth ʻaqāʼidī, tārīkhī (Arabic: رؤية المهدي المنتظر : بحث عقائدي، تاريخي)
- Fī rihab Karbala (Arabic: فى رحاب كربلاء)
- Manāhil al-rajāʼ-- : aʻmāl shahr Rajab
- Manāhil al-rajāʼ-- : aʻmāl shahr Ramaḍān

== See also ==
- List of Shia Muslim scholars of Islam
