= Markaba =

Markaba مركبا
- Municipality
- Location within Lebanon
- Coordinates: 33°14′0″N 35°31′0″E
- Grid position: 197/293 PAL
- Country: Lebanon
- Governorate: Nabatieh Governorate
- District: Marjayoun District
- Elevation: 700 m (2,300 ft)
- Time zone: UTC+2 (EET)
  - Summer (DST): UTC+3 (EEST)
- Dialing code: +961

Markaba (Arabic: مركبا) is a 808 ha (3.12 sq mi) municipality located at Marjayoun municipality at Nabatieh Governorate, Lebanon. It is south of Raabatt Tallame, east of Banni Hayyan and northeast of Talloussah, South Lebanon.

== Etymology ==
E. H. Palmer wrote that the name Markaba came from a personal name, from "to ride" or "to lie", as one thing on top of another.

== History ==
In 1596, it was named as a village, Markaba famous as Marj Kaba, in the Ottoman nahiya (subdistrict) of Tibnin under the liwa' (district) of Safad, with a population of fifteen households and one bachelor, all Muslim. The villagers paid a fixed tax rate of 25% on agricultural products, such as wheat, barley, fruit trees, goats and beehives, in addition to "occasional revenues"; a total of 5,110 akçe.

In 1875 Victor Guérin found Markaba to have 150 Metawileh inhabitants. He further noted: "Here a mosque replaces a more ancient sanctuary, temple, or church, to which belonged several fragments of monolithic columns, and good hewn stones scattered about in the village, or built up in the farm-buildings. About twenty rock-cut cisterns and a sarcophagus also go to prove that this was a place of some importance."

In 1881, the PEF's Survey of Western Palestine (SWP) described it as: "A village, built of stone, containing about 400 Metawileh, situated on top of hill, surrounded by figs, olives, and arable land, with a birket, cisterns and a spring near."

The SWP further noted: "A village containing the remains of an early Christian church; two Corinthian capitals, several broken columns of different sizes, lintels, and some large well-dressed stones scattered about the village. Here is a Greek inscription on a stone, and a cross on another stone. There is a wine-press, rock-cut cisterns, and a dolmen near this village."

== Geography ==
=== Climate ===
It is about 950 metres (3,120 ft) above sea level and thus is dry in the summers and wet in the winter. The average temperature can dip below 0 °C (32 °F) in the winter months of December, January and February. During the spring the weather is temperate and mild. The summer is dry and can reach about 35 °C (95 °F) during the day. Most of the rainfall, which is about 10–16 inches (250–410 mm), is in the winter months and spring.

== Demographics ==
In 2014 Muslims made up 99.51% of registered voters in Markaba. 98.33% of the voters were Shiite Muslims.

The recent population is approximately 3,250 people living in the village. During the holidays or summer season, the maximum population may increase to about 10,000 persons.

=== Religion ===
Almost all of the villagers are Shiites. There are three mosques in the village and one Hussainiyah. The first mosque, in the eastern part of the village, is in good condition. The second mosque, at the center of the village, was damaged during the last war, but underwent reconstruction and is now open.

=== Families ===
Family names in the village include: Sweid, Hammoud, Atwi, Zaraket, Chehimi, Chamseddine, Haidar, Younes, Nour El Deen, Mobarak, Shahla, Baydoun, Saleh, Awada, Fahda, Krayani, El Khalil, Bourji, Khames, Mourad, Raghda, El Hasani, Kashmar, El Ashkar, Rida, Dakik, Noureddine and Messelmani.

== Economy ==
Most local farmers grow olives, wheat and tobacco. Most of the village's income comes from agriculture and money sent from former residents who have overseas jobs or who work in larger cities in Lebanon.

The village depends on agriculture, business, and money transfers from overseas. Most electricity is provided by the government and village's generators.

== Transportation ==
Public transportation in the area takes students from their homes to school daily; there are some taxis which are operated from Marjayoun.

== Bibliography ==
- Conder, C.R.; Kitchener, H.H. (1881). The Survey of Western Palestine: Memoirs of the Topography, Orography, Hydrography, and Archaeology. Vol. 1. London: Committee of the Palestine Exploration Fund.
- Guérin, V. (1880). Description Géographique Historique et Archéologique de la Palestine (in French). Vol. 3: Galilee, pt. 2. Paris: L'Imprimerie Nationale.
- Hütteroth, W.-D.; Abdulfattah, K. (1977). Historical Geography of Palestine, Transjordan and Southern Syria in the Late 16th Century. Erlanger Geographische Arbeiten, Sonderband 5. Erlangen, Germany: Vorstand der Fränkischen Geographischen Gesellschaft. ISBN 3-920405-41-2.
- Palmer, E.H. (1881). The Survey of Western Palestine: Arabic and English Name Lists Collected During the Survey by Lieutenants Conder and Kitchener, R. E. Transliterated and Explained by E.H. Palmer. Committee of the Palestine Exploration Fund.
- Rhode, H. (1979). Administration and Population of the Sancak of Safed in the Sixteenth Century. Columbia University. Archived from the original on 2016-10-10.
