= At Tiri incident =

Military conflict in Lebanon in April 1980

Battle of At Tiri
- Part of the Lebanese Civil War
Date	6–12 April 1980
Location	At Tiri
Result	UNIFIL victory

Belligerents
South Lebanon Army	UNIFIL: (Republic of Ireland) Ireland; Fiji; Netherlands

Commanders and leaders
Saad Haddad	(Republic of Ireland) David Taylor

Casualties and losses
1 dead Several wounded 3 captured	(Republic of Ireland) 1 dead (Fiji) 1 dead

In April 1980, three Irish Army peacekeeping soldiers serving with the United Nations Interim Force in Lebanon (UNIFIL) were shot by the South Lebanon Army also known as the DFF, near At Tiri, in the South Lebanon security belt, two of whom died and one was seriously injured.

== Background ==
On 6 April 1980, clashes between UNIFIL peacekeepers and the South Lebanon Army (an Israeli-backed Lebanese militia) began at At Tiri, when the SLA attacked Irish troops based in the village. During these clashes, sometimes known as the 'Battle of At Tiri', the Irish soldiers held their ground and called in Dutch and Fijian peacekeepers as reinforcements. The battle ended on 12 April when the Dutch contingent employed TOW missiles against the SLA. During the battle, two UNIFIL peacekeepers were killed: Stephen Griffin, a 21-year-old private from the 46th Irish Battalion (and a native of Rahoon in County Galway), and Sevati Sovonaivalu of the Fijian Army. One SLA soldier, 19-year old Massoud Bazzi, was also killed.

Following the battle, Major Saad Haddad of the SLA gave an ultimatum to UNIFIL to either compensate the family of Massoud Bazzi or to produce the bodies of the two deceased UN soldiers.

== Deaths of Privates Barrett and Smallhorne ==
On 18 April, a UNIFIL party set out to a UN post near the Israeli border to provide supplies. The party consisted of three Irish soldiers (Private John O'Mahony (from Killarney), Private Thomas Barrett (from Cork), and Private Derek Smallhorne (from Dublin)), an American officer named Harry Klein, a French officer named Patrick Vincent, and two journalists. They were intercepted by the SLA and taken prisoners.

The US officer, Harry Klein, later noted that the operation was not properly planned and should have been coordinated with militia leaders and the Israelis. He added that helicopters could have been used instead to resupply the post. The convoy also went ahead without an escort, and everyone except for two of the Irish soldiers was unarmed. Klein ordered it to continue even after warning signs became apparent along the route when it passed through a normally busy militia checkpoint. Ultimately, it was intercepted by the militia, who brought the convoy's occupants to a derelict schoolhouse before removing the Irish peace-keepers.

The party was taken to a school building and held in a bathroom, where they were interrogated. The SLA men asked all of the captives their nationalities, and singled out the three Irishmen. One of the SLA men [Mahmoud] began talking about his late brother [Massoud]. According to O'Mahony the man was talking about his brother, whom he would later identify as Mahmoud Bazzi, and another man escorted them down a flight of stairs, where Bazzi shot him and left him there. Although badly wounded, O'Mahony survived. Barrett and Smallhorne escaped the building when the shooting began, but were recaptured by SLA men outside. The remaining members of the party left the building, with Klein carrying the wounded O'Mahony to a vehicle. One of the journalists claimed he saw Barrett and Smallhorne in the back of a car that was speeding away.

Barrett and Smallhorne were later found dead nearby. They had been shot dead and their bodies showed signs of torture.

== Trial ==
Mahmoud Bazzi, the brother of Massoud Bazzi, who had been killed in the Battle of At Tiri, who was also member of the SLA, was the primary suspect in the murders. Shortly after the incident, he openly admitted to killing Barrett and Smallhorne on Lebanese television and claimed he did so to avenge his brother, but later retracted his statements, claiming his commander had forced him. In 1994, he was granted asylum in the United States, and worked as an ice cream vendor in Dearborn, Michigan.

U.S. authorities interviewed one of the journalists involved and O'Mahony, and expressed their willingness to testify against Bazzi, but claimed that they had not heard anything more from the authorities for years. Bazzi was also interviewed by officials. In 2013, he applied for U.S. citizenship, but the application stalled when the investigation picked up.

In July 2014, Bazzi was arrested for "administrative immigration violations" by US federal agents at his Dearborn home. He was alleged to have entered the United States on a false passport. Friends and relatives of Privates Barrett and Smallhorne had been seeking his deportation to Lebanon to face war crimes charges. In August 2014, Bazzi confessed to immigration fraud and agreed to be deported to Lebanon.

In late 2015, Mahmoud Bazzi was arrested and put on trial before a Beirut military court with a seven-judge panel. John O'Mahony gave evidence during the trial, and positively identified Bazzi as the man who shot him and led Barrett and Smallhorne away. He was protected at all times by a Close Protection Team from the Irish Army Ranger Wing. The trial was adjourned until April 2016, and on 8 September 2016 was further adjourned.

In 2018 it was reported that Bazzi had been found guilty in a Lebanese military court of "collaboration with Israel" and sentenced to 5 years of "hard labour". A hearing on the murder charges was due to occur in late June 2018.

On 21 December 2020, a Lebanese military court said it had found ex-militia member Mahmoud Bazzi guilty of the murders of Private Thomas Barrett and Private Derek Smallhorne on 18 April 1980. The court sentenced Bazzi to life in prison, but immediately reduced this sentence to 15 years on the basis of his age (he was 76 at time of conviction).
