= Yater =

Yater is a surname. Notable people with the surname include:

- George David Yater (1910–1993), American painter
- Reynolds Yater (born 1932), American surfboard builder
- Torin Yater-Wallace (born 1995), American freestyle skier

== See also ==
- Yatar, also known as Yater, Lebanese municipality
