= Tayr Harfa =

Tayr Harfa طير حرفا
- Municipality
- Location within Lebanon
- Coordinates: 33°7′35″N 35°13′9″E
- Grid position: 170/281 PAL
- Country: Lebanon
- Governorate: South Governorate
- District: Tyre
- Highest elevation: 1,380 ft (420 m)
- Time zone: GMT +3

Tayr Harfa (Arabic: طير حرفا, romanized: Ṭayr Ḥarfā) is a municipality in Tyre District in Southern Lebanon, located 16 kilometres south of Tyre.

== Etymology ==
According to E. H. Palmer, the name means "The fortress of Harfa".

== History ==
In 1852, during the late Ottoman era, Edward Robinson noted it on his travels in the region.

In 1875, Victor Guérin found here 200 Metuali inhabitants.

In 1881, the PEF's Survey of Western Palestine (SWP) described it: "A stone and mud village, containing about 200 Moslems, on a hill, with olives, figs, and arable land, and waste ground covered with brushwood. Water from cisterns."

== Demographics ==
In 2014 Muslims made up 99.41% of registered voters in Tayr Harfa. 96.30% of the voters were Shiite Muslims.

== Bibliography ==
- Conder, C.R.; Kitchener, H.H. (1881). The Survey of Western Palestine: Memoirs of the Topography, Orography, Hydrography, and Archaeology. Vol. 1. London: Committee of the Palestine Exploration Fund.
- Guérin, V. (1880). Description Géographique Historique et Archéologique de la Palestine (in French). Vol. 3: Galilee, pt. 2. Paris: L'Imprimerie Nationale.
- Palmer, E.H. (1881). The Survey of Western Palestine: Arabic and English Name Lists Collected During the Survey by Lieutenants Conder and Kitchener, R. E. Transliterated and Explained by E.H. Palmer. Committee of the Palestine Exploration Fund.
- Robinson, E.; Smith, E. (1856). Later Biblical Researches in Palestine and adjacent regions: A Journal of Travels in the year 1852. London: John Murray.
