= Yater, Lebanon =

Yater ياطر
- Municipality
- Location within Lebanon
- Coordinates: 33°9′14″N 35°19′43″E
- Grid position: 181/284 PAL
- Country: Lebanon
- Governorate: Nabatieh Governorate
- District: Bint Jbeil District

Area
  - Total: 8.32 km^{2} (3.21 sq mi)
- Elevation: 710 m (2,330 ft)

Population
  - Estimate (2015): 1,206
- Time zone: UTC+2 (EET)
  - Summer (DST): UTC+3 (EEST)

Yater or Yatar (Levantine Arabic: ياطر, romanized: Yāṭar) is a Lebanese municipality located in Bint Jbeil District. It is 112 kilometers away from Beirut.

== Etymology ==
E. H. Palmer wrote that the name Yater came from a personal name.

== History ==
=== Antiquity ===
Yater is identified with Yatir (Hebrew: יתיר), a place referenced in the Baraita on the "Boundaries of the Land of Israel" as part of the delineation of the northwestern border of Jewish resettlement following the return from Babylonian exile. Scholarly analysis suggests that this text describes the Hasmonean or Herodian periods (2nd or 1st century BCE). Another possibility is At Tiri, although Finkelstein and Frankel argue that Yater is more plausible.

Yater was mentioned in the 3rd century Mosaic of Rehob.

=== Ottoman period ===
In 1852, Edward Robinson visited and found "some few remains of antiquity", including two excavated chambers at the south of the village.

In 1875 Victor Guérin found Yater to have 160 Metawileh inhabitants. He further said that the ancient name of Yater must have been Yattir or Jether; "Two other rocky hills, situated, the first to the south, the second to the south-west of this village, served as cemeteries to the ancient city. All the stones with which it was built were taken from this place. Vast quarries, cisterns, presses, and tombs, have been cut in the sides and on the summits of these hills, which are separated by a narrow valley. The greater contained each nine loculi, grouped three to left, and at the end under a vaulted arcosolium. The facade of two among them is pierced by several small niches, some designed for simple lamps, others for statuettes. One of these caves seems to have been set aside for some sacred purpose."

According to the SWP: "There are three rock-cut tombs, with side loculi and kokim, at this village; one of these has an olive-press inside. The rock is much quarried round, and the place has the appearance of having been an ancient site. There is also a rock-cut wine-press and ruined birkeh. To the north-west there are two ruined watch-towers, with rough-hewn stones. To the north there is another similar, with a cistern."

In 1881, the PEF's Survey of Western Palestine (SWP) described it as: "A stone village, containing about 300 Metawileh, situated on hill-top, with olives and arable land about, having a birket and many cisterns and a spring near it."

=== Modern period ===
During the Israeli occupation of southern Lebanon, 15 September 1991, two Palestinian gunmen ambushed a Nepali UNIFIL patrol near Yater. One Nepali soldier was killed and another wounded. One of the gunmen was killed by return fire while the other escaped.

The Israeli Army occupied Yater and neighbouring Kafra, 20 February 1992, in a 24 hour incursion, backed by tanks, helicopters and heavy artillery. Around 100 buildings were destroyed, including a mosque, school and community center. Two Israeli soldiers were killed during the offensive and a young girl was killed in northern Israel by a subsequent rocket attack.

On 22 February 1993, a Nepali soldier serving with UNIFIL was killed by Israeli artillery fire near Yater. Two years later, 20 March 1995, another Nepali soldier was also killed and three others wounded by Israeli shelling in the same area.

Two men installing a water tank on top of a house in Yater were killed by an Israeli missile on 30 March 1996. Hezbollah responded by firing rockets into northern Israel. It was one of the incidents in the build-up to Operation Grapes of Wrath the following month which caused massive destruction across all of the south of Lebanon.

== Demographics ==
In 2014 Muslims made up 99.50% of registered voters in Yater. 98.64% of the voters were Shiite Muslims.

== Notable people ==
- Ali Al-Kourani (born 1944) Shia scholar and cleric
- Hossein Korani Ameli (1955–2019) one of founders of Hizbullah
- Hassan Kourani (born 1995), Lebanese footballer

== Bibliography ==
- Conder, C.R.; Kitchener, H.H. (1881). The Survey of Western Palestine: Memoirs of the Topography, Orography, Hydrography, and Archaeology. Vol. 1. London: Committee of the Palestine Exploration Fund.
- Frankel, Raphael; Finkelstein, I. (1983). "'The Northwest Corner of Eretz-Israel' in the Baraita 'Boundaries of Eretz-Israel'". Cathedra: For the History of Eretz Israel and Its Yishuv. 27 (27): 39–46. JSTOR 23398920.
- Guérin, V. (1880). Description Géographique Historique et Archéologique de la Palestine (in French). Vol. 3: Galilee, pt. 2. Paris: L'Imprimerie Nationale.
- Palmer, E. H. (1881). The Survey of Western Palestine: Arabic and English Name Lists Collected During the Survey by Lieutenants Conder and Kitchener, R. E. Transliterated and Explained by E.H. Palmer. Committee of the Palestine Exploration Fund.
- Robinson, E.; Smith, E. (1856). Later Biblical Researches in Palestine and adjacent regions: A Journal of Travels in the year 1852. London: John Murray.
