= Dibbin =

Dibbin دبين
- Municipality
- Location within Lebanon
- Coordinates: 33°22′10″N 35°35′41″E
- Grid position: 136/159 L
- Country: Lebanon
- Governorate: Nabatieh Governorate
- District: Marjayoun District
- Elevation: 650 m (2,130 ft)
- Time zone: UTC+2 (EET)
  - Summer (DST): UTC+3 (EEST)
- Dialing code: +961

Dibbin (Arabic: دبين, romanized: Dibbīn) is a municipality in the Marjayoun District in southern Lebanon, located just north of Marjayoun.

== History ==
In 1596, it was named as a village, Dibin, in the Ottoman nahiya (subdistrict) of Tibnin under the liwa' (district) of Safad, with a population of 41 households and 6 bachelors, all Muslim. The villagers paid a fixed tax-rate of 25 % on agricultural products, such as wheat, barley, olive trees, "dulab harir", goats, beehives; in addition to occasional revenues, a press for olive oil or grape syrup; a total of 3,969 akçe.

In 1838, Eli Smith noted Dibbine as a predominantly Metawileh and Greek Christian village.

== Demographics ==
In 2014 Muslims made up 93.77% and Christians made up 6.04% of registered voters in Dibbin. 87.49% of the voters were Shiite Muslims.

== Bibliography ==
- Hütteroth, W.-D.; Abdulfattah, K. (1977). Historical Geography of Palestine, Transjordan and Southern Syria in the Late 16th Century. Erlanger Geographische Arbeiten, Sonderband 5. Erlangen, Germany: Vorstand der Fränkischen Geographischen Gesellschaft. ISBN 3-920405-41-2.
- Rhode, H. (1979). Administration and Population of the Sancak of Safed in the Sixteenth Century. Columbia University. Archived from the original on 2020-03-01.
- Robinson, E.; Smith, E. (1841). Biblical Researches in Palestine, Mount Sinai and Arabia Petraea: A Journal of Travels in the year 1838. Vol. 3. Boston: Crocker & Brewster.
