= Zibqin =

- Municipality
- زبقين
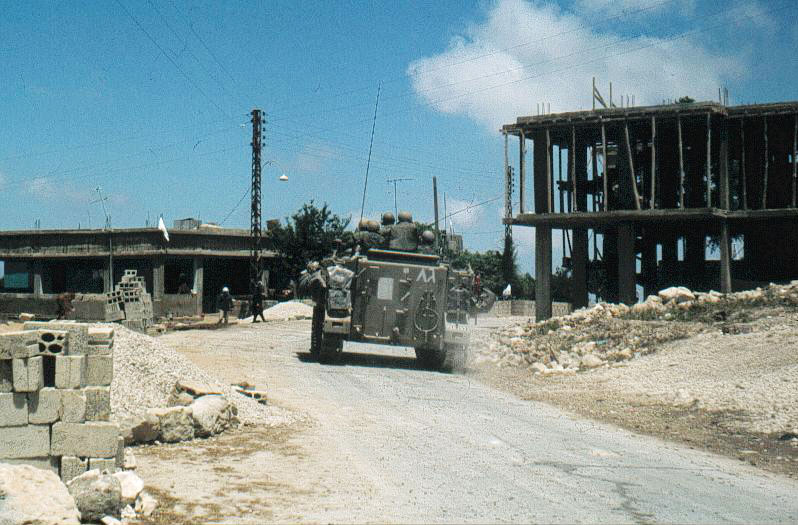
- Israeli troops in Zibqin, in 1982

- Location within Lebanon
- Coordinates: 33°10′N 35°16′E
- Grid position: 175/285 PAL
- Country: Lebanon
- Governorate: South Governorate
- District: Tyre

Area
  - Total: 5.63 sq mi (14.57 km^{2})
  - Land: 5.63 sq mi (14.57 km^{2})
  - Water: 0 sq mi (0 km^{2})
- Elevation: 1,280 ft (390 m)

Population (2015)
  - Total: 3,000
- Time zone: GMT +3

Zibqin (Arabic: زبقين, romanized: Zibqīn) is a municipality in South Lebanon, 103 kilometres (64 mi) from the capital, Beirut, 4 km from the border with Israel and 450 metres (1,476.4 ft) above sea level.

It was heavily damaged in the 2006 Lebanon-Israel war and underwent a heavy process of rebuilding.

== Etymology ==
According to E. H. Palmer, the name probably comes from the Arabic word for "to bind", or "confine".

== History ==
In 1596, it was named as a village, Zibqin, in the Ottoman nahiya (subdistrict) of Tibnin under the liwa' (district) of Safad, with a population of 12 households and 12 bachelor, all Muslim. The villagers paid a fixed tax rate of 25% on agricultural products, such as wheat, barley, olive trees, goats and beehives, in addition to "occasional revenues" and winter pastures; a total of 3,172 akçe.

In 1875, Victor Guérin found the village to contain eighty Metawileh. He further "observed a great pool, constructed with regularly cut stones, and several broken columns. On the chapter of one he saw a mosaic representing a cross fleuronnée, which proves that it came from a church."

In 1881, the PEF's Survey of Western Palestine (SWP) described it: "Small ruined village on a hill, surrounded by brushwood; contains about thirty Moslems [..], and has olives and arable land to the south. The water is supplied by cisterns."

During the 2006 Lebanon-Israel war, on 13 July, 12 civilians were killed by Israeli missiles, fired on the house of the late Mukhtar. All the victims belonged to the Bzeih family, and they included 6 women and 5 children, aged between 11 and 78 years of age. There was no Hezbollah activity in the vicinity at the time of the attack. The IDF gave no explanations as to why the house had been attacked. On August 9, 2025 six soldiers of the Lebanese Army were killed in explosion that took place in a Hezbollah depot.

== Demographics ==
In 2014 Muslims made up 99.78% of registered voters in Zibqin. 99.21% of the voters were Shiite Muslims.

== Bibliography ==
- Conder, C.R.; Kitchener, H.H. (1881). The Survey of Western Palestine: Memoirs of the Topography, Orography, Hydrography, and Archaeology. Vol. 1. London: Committee of the Palestine Exploration Fund.
- Guérin, V. (1880). Description Géographique Historique et Archéologique de la Palestine (in French). Vol. 3: Galilee, pt. 2. Paris: L'Imprimerie Nationale.
- HRW (2007). Why They Died: Civilian Casualties in Lebanon During the 2006 War. Human Rights Watch.
- Hütteroth, W.-D.; Abdulfattah, K. (1977). Historical Geography of Palestine, Transjordan and Southern Syria in the Late 16th Century. Erlanger Geographische Arbeiten, Sonderband 5. Erlangen, Germany: Vorstand der Fränkischen Geographischen Gesellschaft. ISBN 3-920405-41-2.
- Palmer, E.H. (1881). The Survey of Western Palestine: Arabic and English Name Lists Collected During the Survey by Lieutenants Conder and Kitchener, R. E. Transliterated and Explained by E.H. Palmer. Committee of the Palestine Exploration Fund.
- Rhode, H. (1979). Administration and Population of the Sancak of Safed in the Sixteenth Century. Columbia University. Archived from the original on 2020-03-01.
