= Bissariyeh =

Bissariyeh البيسارية Al-Baisariyah
- Municipality
- Location in Lebanon
- Coordinates: 33°26′46″N 35°19′30″E
- Country: Lebanon
- Governorate: South Governorate
- District: Sidon District
- Time zone: UTC+2 (EET)
  - Summer (DST): UTC+3 (EEST)

Babliyeh (Arabic: البيسارية, romanized: al-Baysāriyah) is a municipality in the Sidon District of the South Governorate in Lebanon.

== History ==
In 1875, during the end of the Ottoman era, Victor Guérin noted the village was inhabited with Metualis.

== Demographics ==
In 2014 Muslims made up 99.75% of registered voters in Babliyeh. 70.40% of the voters were Shiite Muslims and 29.34% were Sunni Muslims.

== Notable people ==
- Amal Khalil

== Bibliography ==
- Guérin, V. (1880). Description Géographique Historique et Archéologique de la Palestine (in French). Vol. 3: Galilee, pt. 2. Paris: L'Imprimerie Nationale.
