= At-Tiri =

Village in Nabatieh Governorate, Lebanon

At-Tiri الطيري
- Municipality
- Location within Lebanon
- Coordinates: 33°08′31″N 35°24′19″E
- Grid position: 187/282 PAL
- Country: Lebanon
- Governorate: Nabatieh Governorate
- District: Bint Jbeil District
- Elevation: 750 m (2,460 ft)
- Time zone: UTC+2 (EET)
  - Summer (DST): UTC+3 (EEST)
- Dialing code: +961

See Tira for other sites with similar names.

At-Tiri (Arabic: الطيري, romanized: aṭ-Ṭīrī) is a municipality located in the kaza of Bint Jbeil in the Nabatieh Governorate in Lebanon. It is also the location of two pre-historic archaeological sites.

== History ==
Taire I (referred to as Et Taireh I) is located 3.5 km north of Ain Ebel to the west of the village. The exact location of the site is unknown and the assemblage found was small and of indeterminable date. It was only mentioned in passing by Paul Bovier-Lapierre in 1908 and Karge in 1918.

Taire II (referred to as Et Taireh II and Bassatine el Khawabi) is a Heavy Neolithic archaeological site of the Qaraoun culture. It is located 2 kilometres (1.2 mi) northeast of the village on a small track leading to Kounine that crosses the road between Bent Jbeil and Tibnine. A collection was made south of the track at 690 m above sea level by Jesuit archaeologist Henri Fleisch, who did not publish it but confirmed that the Qaraoun culture was present this far south via personal communication to Lorraine Copeland. The collection is held by the Museum of Lebanese Prehistory at the Saint Joseph University.

It is possible that At-Tiri is Yatir (Hebrew: יתיר), a place referenced in the Baraita on the "Boundaries of the Land of Israel" as part of the delineation of the northwestern border of Jewish resettlement following the return from Babylonian exile. However, Finkelstein and Frankel argue that Yater is the more likely candidate.

=== Ottoman era ===
In 1596, it was named as a village, Taira in the Ottoman nahiya (subdistrict) of Tibnin under the liwa' (district) of Safad, with a population of 29 households and 7 bachelors, all Muslim. The villagers paid a fixed tax rate of 25% on agricultural products, such as wheat, barley, fruit trees, goats and beehives, in addition to "occasional revenues" and a fixed sum; a total of 1,656 akçe.

In 1838, Edward Robinson noted the village on his travels in the region.

In 1875, Victor Guérin visited, and found it to be a village with 150 "Metualis". He further noted: "Here is a little mosque, some of the cut stones in which have probably been taken from some ancient building now destroyed. Other cut stones of similar appearance, and trunks of columns scattered about the village, belong apparently to the same monument. A great birkeh, partly cut in the rock and partly built of medium-sized regular stones, adjoins the houses. Broken sarcophagi are lying about: their lids have acroteria."

In 1881, the PEF's Survey of Western Palestine (SWP) described it: "A small stone village, containing about eighty Metawileh, in narrow valley, with grapes, a few olives, and figs; many cisterns in and round village; on hill-side old masonry birket.”

"Many old and well-cut stones and broken fragments of a pillar were observed at this village, showing probably early Christian occupation. An old masonry birkeh and a large sarcophagus, for three bodies under one lid, was observed. Three-quarters of a mile to the south-east there is a dolmen on the side of the road of small dimensions."

=== Modern era ===
The village is noted for the At Tiri Incident: an April 1980 confrontation between the United Nations Interim Force in Lebanon (UNIFIL) and the South Lebanon Army in which two Irish Army soldiers were killed.

On July 23, during the 2006 Lebanon War, 3 civilians from At Tiri were killed while 13 others were wounded by Israel, as they were trying to flee the village. The Lebanese Red Cross in Tyre said ten vehicles carrying civilians and three or four motorcycles had been attacked by the IDF the same day making a total of forty-one injured (two critically), and three dead in attacks on convoys.

It was one of the first villages attacked during the 2024 Israeli assault in September.

== Demographics ==
In 2014 Muslims made up 99.72% of registered voters in At-Tiri. 97.99% of the voters were Shiite Muslims.

== Notable people ==
- Hassan Chaito (born 1989), Lebanese footballer
- Hassan Chaitou (born 1991), Lebanese footballer

== Bibliography ==
- Conder, C.R.; Kitchener, H.H. (1881). The Survey of Western Palestine: Memoirs of the Topography, Orography, Hydrography, and Archaeology. Vol. 1. London: Committee of the Palestine Exploration Fund.
- Guérin, V. (1880). Description Géographique Historique et Archéologique de la Palestine (in French). Vol. 3: Galilee, pt. 2. Paris: L'Imprimerie Nationale.
- HRW (2007). Why They Died: Civilian Casualties in Lebanon During the 2006 War. Human Rights Watch.
- Hütteroth, W.-D.; Abdulfattah, K. (1977). Historical Geography of Palestine, Transjordan and Southern Syria in the Late 16th Century. Erlanger Geographische Arbeiten, Sonderband 5. Erlangen, Germany: Vorstand der Fränkischen Geographischen Gesellschaft. ISBN 3-920405-41-2.
- Murphy, Ray (2007). UN Peacekeeping in Lebanon, Somalia and Kosovo: Operational and Legal Issues. Cambridge University Press. ISBN 978-0-521-84305-8.
- Palmer, E.H. (1881). The Survey of Western Palestine: Arabic and English Name Lists Collected During the Survey by Lieutenants Conder and Kitchener, R. E. Transliterated and Explained by E.H. Palmer. Committee of the Palestine Exploration Fund.
- Rhode, H. (1979). Administration and Population of the Sancak of Safed in the Sixteenth Century. Columbia University. Archived from the original on 20 April 2019.
- Robinson, E.; Smith, E. (1841). Biblical Researches in Palestine, Mount Sinai and Arabia Petraea: A Journal of Travels in the year 1838. Vol. 3. Boston: Crocker & Brewster.
