= Meiss Ej Jabal =

Meiss Ej Jabal ميس الجبل
- Municipality
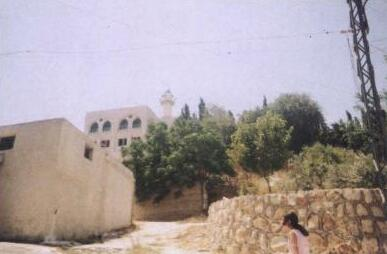
- Abi Zar mosque in Meiss Ej Jabal

- Location within Lebanon
- Coordinates: 33°10′10″N 35°31′32″E
- Grid position: 198/286 PAL
- Country: Lebanon
- Governorate: Nabatieh Governorate
- District: Marjayoun District
- Elevation: 630 m (2,070 ft)
- Time zone: UTC+2 (EET)
  - Summer (DST): UTC+3 (EEST)
- Dialing code: +961

Meiss Ej Jabal or Mais aj-Jabal (Arabic: ميس الجبل, romanized: Mays al-Jabal) is a municipality in the Marjayoun District in Lebanon.

== Etymology ==
According to E. H. Palmer, the name Meis comes from the name of a tree.

== Location ==
The municipality of Meiss Ej Jabal is located in the Marjayoun District, one of the eight mohafazats (governorates) of Lebanon. Meiss Ej Jabal is 114 kilometers (70.8396 mi) away from Beyrouth (Beirut) the capital of Lebanon. Its elevation is 630 meters (2067.03 ft - 688.968 yd) above sea level. Meiss Ej Jabal surface stretches for 1924 hectares (19.24 km^{2} - 7.42664 mi^{2}).

== History ==
In 1596, it was named as a village, Mis, in the Ottoman nahiya (subdistrict) of Tibnin under the liwa' (district) of Safad, with a population of 75 households and 11 bachelors, all Muslim. The villagers paid a fixed tax-rate of 25% on agricultural products, such as wheat, barley, summer crops, olive trees, vegetable and fruit garden or orchard, goats, beehives; in addition to occasional revenues, a press for olive oil or grape syrup and a winter pastures; a total of 12,860 akçe.

In 1881, the PEF's Survey of Western Palestine (SWP) found here: "ancient remains; one olive-press and two sarcophagi on the east side." They further described it: "A large village in two parts, containing about 700 Metawileh, on low ridge, surrounded by figs, olives, and arable land. There is a birket near the village, and three good springs to the north, besides cisterns."

=== Modern era ===
Images taken by the Associated Press on 12 and 15 April 2026 in Mays al-Jabal showed excavators used by the IDF flattened houses, "as well as Hyundai, Caterpillar and Komatsu excavators actively destroying homes".

== Demographics ==
In 2014, Muslims made up 99.58% of registered voters in Meiss Ej Jabal. 98.33% of the voters were Shiite Muslims.

== Shrine ==
The village holds a Shia shrine for the prophet's companion Abu Dharr. Another Shia shrine to Abu Dharr is located in Sarepta. The village also contains a husayniyya.

== Educational Establishments ==
Educational establishments	Meiss Ej Jabal (2005-2006)	Lebanon (2005-2006)
Number of Schools	3	2788
Public School	2	1763
Private School	1	1025
Students schooled in the public schools	435	439905
Students schooled in the private schools	144	471409

== Bibliography ==
- Conder, C.R.; Kitchener, H.H. (1881). The Survey of Western Palestine: Memoirs of the Topography, Orography, Hydrography, and Archaeology. Vol. 1. London: Committee of the Palestine Exploration Fund.
- Hütteroth, W.-D.; Abdulfattah, K. (1977). Historical Geography of Palestine, Transjordan and Southern Syria in the Late 16th Century. Erlanger Geographische Arbeiten, Sonderband 5. Erlangen, Germany: Vorstand der Fränkischen Geographischen Gesellschaft. ISBN 3-920405-41-2.
- Palmer, E.H. (1881). The Survey of Western Palestine: Arabic and English Name Lists Collected During the Survey by Lieutenants Conder and Kitchener, R. E. Transliterated and Explained by E.H. Palmer. Committee of the Palestine Exploration Fund.
- Rhode, H. (1979). Administration and Population of the Sancak of Safed in the Sixteenth Century. Columbia University. Archived from the original on 2020-03-01.
