= Hezbollah tunnels =

Network in Southern Lebanon

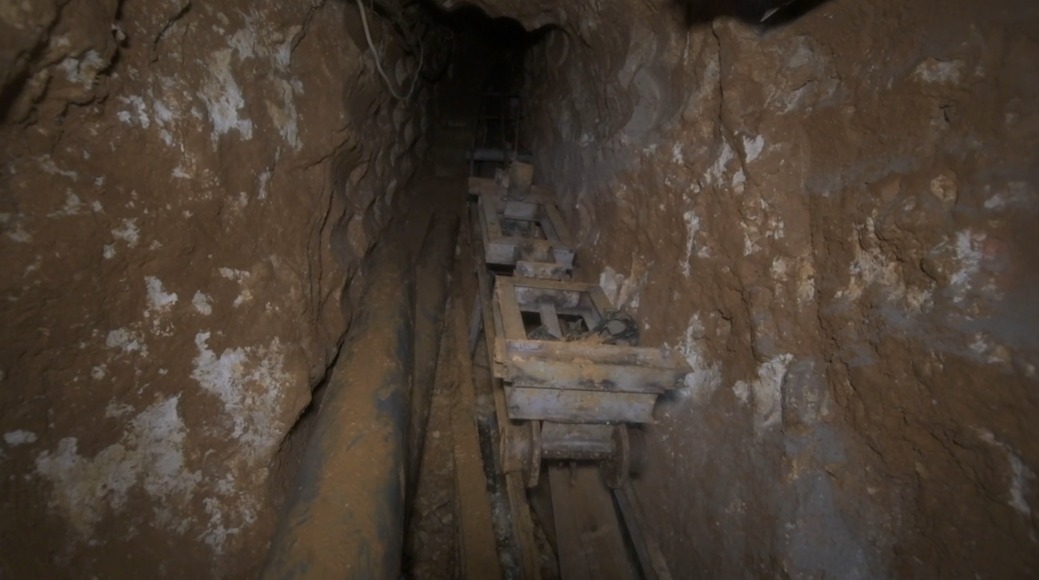
An 80 meter deep Hezbollah tunnel seized by the IDF

Hezbollah's underground tunnels (or Hezbollah tunnels network or Hezbollah's underground facilities, Arabic: أنفاق حزب الله) are a network of underground passages used by Hezbollah, primarily in southern Lebanon, along the Lebanon-Israel border. These tunnels are often used for military purposes, such as smuggling weapons, storing supplies, and allowing fighters to move discreetly. The tunnels have been a significant concern for Israel, which views them as a direct security threat. The presence of tunnels near the so-called blue line, as well as incursions into Lebanese territory by other countries, constitute a violation of United Nations Security Council Resolution 1701, such violations contribute to the ongoing tensions between Israel and Hezbollah.

== History ==
Nicholas Blanford, a Beirut-based Hezbollah expert considers that Hezbollah's tunnel networks began in the mid-1980s after the 1982 Lebanon War resulting from the invasion of Lebanon by Israel that led to the creation of the Hezbollah. These tunnels were built with North Korean engineering designs, aided by financial and logistical support from the Iranian government, and facilitated by Ba'athist Syrian leadership discussions that connected North Korean officials with Hezbollah's network. These tunnels were used shortly after launching its own military operations against the occupation state in the 1990s. However, the investment in tunnel construction has been increased since the early 2000s, due partially to the armed conflict with the South Lebanon Army and military operations against Israeli military posts in occupied Lebanese territory, and particularly since the 2006 Lebanon War. Israel has conducted operations to locate and destroy these tunnels, viewing them as a significant threat to its security.

In April 2026, Syria reported it found two Hezbollah smuggling tunnels in the Qusayr region, near the village of village of Hosh al‑Sayed. The tunnels crossed the border from the Syrian territory to the Lebanese territory. Both tunnels were located within 24 hours of each other. Later sealed by the Syrian forces.

=== Operation Northern Shield ===
In December 2018, Israel launched "Operation Northern Shield" to detect and destroy the tunnels. Since 2018, the Israel Defense Forces (IDF) claimed to have found and destroyed several tunnels crossing the border from Lebanon into Israel.

== UN involvement ==
With the resolution 1701 of the Security Council agreed in 2006, the blue line was used to monitor the withdrawal of Israeli forces from southern Lebanon and the activities of armed groups. The resolution states that the area must be free of arms and armed personnel except for the Lebanese armed forces and UN peacekeepers, and no foreign forces can be present in Lebanon without the consent of its government. The United Nations Interim Force in Lebanon (UNIFIL) is responsible for ensuring compliance by all parties with this resolution and has reported violations of resolution UN 1701 by both sides, Israel and Hezbollah, according to the Security Council reports.

The UNIFIL confirmed the existence of three tunnels that had been reported by IDF. UNIFIL also confirmed that an old concrete factory in Kfar Kela had an opening to the tunnel, which crossed the Blue Line.

== Purposes ==
These tunnels serve various purposes, including:

- Military Operations: They allow Hezbollah fighters to move undetected and launch surprise attacks against Israeli forces.
- Smuggling: The tunnels are used for smuggling weapons and supplies, often circumventing Israeli surveillance.
- Shelter: They provide protection for fighters during airstrikes or ground operations.
- Logistics: The network facilitates communication and transportation of goods and personnel.

== See also ==
- United Nations Interim Force in Lebanon
- South Lebanon conflict (1985–2000)
- Israeli occupation of Southern Lebanon
