= Talloussah =

Talloussah طلوسة
- Municipality
- Location within Lebanon
- Coordinates: 33°14′10.5″N 35°29′06.2″E
- Grid position: 195/293 PAL
- Country: Lebanon
- Governorate: Nabatieh Governorate
- District: Marjayoun District
- Elevation: 520 m (1,710 ft)
- Time zone: UTC+2 (EET)
  - Summer (DST): UTC+3 (EEST)
- Dialing code: +961

Talloussah (Arabic: طلوسة, romanized: Ṭallūssah) is a municipality in the Marjayoun District in southern Lebanon.

== Etymology ==
According to E. H. Palmer, the name comes from a personal name.

== History ==
The famed Second Scholarly Martyr of Shia Islam, Zayn al-Din al-Juba'i al'Amili al-Ṭalluṣī, traces his ancestry to the Talloussah village.

In 1881, the PEF's Survey of Western Palestine (SWP) described it as: "A small village, built of stone, containing about 100 Metawileh, situated on hill-top, and surrounded by arable cultivation, water supplied from cisterns and birket."

On 4 March 1992 one SLA member was killed and five wounded in an ambush on the Talloussah road. The following day the IDF raided the village, searching houses and detaining villagers. UNIFIL lodged a complaint with the Israelis after their observers were prevented from entering the village to inspect condition of residents.

During the 2006 Lebanon War, Israeli warplanes killed three civilians belonging to the Mukhtar´s family in the village.

== Demographics ==
As of 2010, the village had approximately 3,017 residents, though only 400 lived in the settlement year round, rising to about 1,100 in the summer months. Most of the remaining population had been displaced by the 2006 Lebanon War and had either settled in the southern suburbs of Beirut or were living abroad. It is unclear how many of the displaced would return in the coming years.

In 2014 Muslims made up 99.77% of registered voters in Talloussah. 98.79% of the voters were Shiite Muslims.

== Bibliography ==
- Conder, C.R.; Kitchener, H.H. (1881). The Survey of Western Palestine: Memoirs of the Topography, Orography, Hydrography, and Archaeology. Vol. 1. London: Committee of the Palestine Exploration Fund.
- HRW (2007). Why They Died: Civilian Casualties in Lebanon During the 2006 War. Human Rights Watch.
- Palmer, E.H. (1881). The Survey of Western Palestine: Arabic and English Name Lists Collected During the Survey by Lieutenants Conder and Kitchener, R. E. Transliterated and Explained by E.H. Palmer. Committee of the Palestine Exploration Fund.
