= Timeline of the 2006 Lebanon War (mid August) =

This is a timeline of the 2006 Lebanon War during mid August.

== August 10 ==
IDF
- The IDF reveals that 15 reserve soldiers were killed and 40 were wounded in clashes on August 9, Israel's deadliest day of fighting since the war began. In fighting in the villages of Marjayoun, Khiam and Kila, eight Israeli soldiers were wounded in a mortar attack. Another soldier was lightly hurt by anti-tank rocket fire. One soldier was also wounded by anti-tank fire in the security zone near Bint Jbail.
- As cease-fire negotiations appeared to stall, Israel lobbed artillery rounds into southern Lebanon at daybreak while troops backed by tanks and armored vehicles moved across the border. Israel ratcheted up its fight against Hezbollah, beginning operations aimed at the heart of Beirut, taking control of a largely Christian southern Lebanese town. The Israeli military also dropped leaflets in Beirut, warning of expanded operations inside the capital and urging people in southern Shiite neighborhoods to evacuate. Those neighborhoods have been bastions of support for Hezbollah. "To the people who live in Hay El Soulom, Borj El Barajneh, Shiyah ... For your safety," one flier warned. "You must evacuate these areas immediately and evacuate any area from where Hezbollah and its members or their assistants are launching their terrorist operations. Be aware!" To date, Hezbollah has fired 3,333 rockets into northern Israel, Israeli authorities report. Another flier from the IDF threatens civilians directly: "each expansion of Hizbollah terrorist operations will lead to a harsh and powerful response and its painful response will not be confined to Hassan's gang of criminals."
- Israeli troops have seized the southern Lebanese town of Marjeyoun and heavy clashes were reported in the area around the town after armoured columns crossed the Lebanese border overnight. Other Israeli troops also advanced on the town of Khiam. Israeli jets also struck a lighthouse used as a cell phone communications tower in central Beirut. Witnesses said they saw a man being loaded into an ambulance at the scene. There was no immediate information on his condition. The area, located in an upscale neighborhood where slain former Lebanese Prime Minister Rafik Hariri lived, is outside the Hezbollah-dominated southern suburbs that Israeli forces have targeted up to now. Israeli troops had warned residents to remain in their homes as forces moved toward the nearby town of Blatt, Lebanese military intelligence and police said. The secured area overlooks the Litani River, where Hezbollah fighters have reportedly launched rockets into Israel, sources said.
- An Israeli unmanned drone fired a missile on a minibus driving in the Bekaa Valley, thus killing one person and wounding 12. The attack happened near the town of Rayak. Another air strike targeted a road linking the city of Baalbek with the Syrian city of Homs.
Israel
- An Israeli government spokeswoman said the Marjayoun-offensive was not part of an expanded campaign that Israel's Security Cabinet had approved earlier in the day. A sticking point in the U.S.-France plan to end the conflict remains a Lebanese call for Israel's immediate withdrawal from southern Lebanon. More than 950 people have died in the conflict so far, Israeli authorities said. Most have been Lebanese civilians. On a separate front, the Gaza-Egypt border crossing is closing until further notice, Israel said, citing specific security alerts.
Hezbollah
- Two Israeli civilians, including a child—were killed and two were wounded after Hezbollah launched a Katyusha rocket into the Arab village of Deir al Assad in northern Israel. Another rocket struck the Krayot, the northern suburbs of Haifa. The strike on Haifa came a day after Hezbollah leader Hassan Nasrallah urged Israeli Arabs in the city to leave. Hezbollah announced "violent battles" in Marjeyoun, and Arab news networks Al-Manar and Al Arabiya reported at least two Israeli tanks were destroyed in fighting there. By afternoon, Hezbollah had sent 136 rockets into northern Israel, police said. To date, Hezbollah has fired 3,333 rockets into northern Israel, Israeli authorities report.
Lebanon
- Lebanese security forces said that, to this day 834 people have died, most of them civilians, and nearly 3,211 have been wounded since fighting began on July 12.
- About 350 Lebanese soldiers and police in Marjayoun have been detained by Israeli forces, after IDF took the village.
- Receiving warning leaflets from Israel were northern Lebanese towns including El Beddaoui, Lebanese Internal Security Forces said. Those leaflets warned that Israel will target any type of truck moving along the coastal road. "Be aware that anybody using pick-ups or trucks puts his life in danger," one leaflet warned. The leaflets said such vehicles will be targeted under suspicion of "transporting rockets, military ammunitions and terrorists." North of Beirut, three Israeli rockets launched from the sea also hit three state radio towers, Lebanese police said. Those towers already have been targets of attacks during the conflict. Israeli troops had warned residents to remain in their homes as forces moved toward the nearby town of Blatt, Lebanese military intelligence and police said.
- While Lebanese intelligence said Israeli troops did not experience any resistance during their advance to Marjayoun, Lebanese military sources and U.N. observers described a vicious battle in Khiyam, which Israel said is a Hezbollah stronghold. A Lebanese military source said Israeli troops backed by five tanks moved into a Lebanese army base in Marjeyoun, meeting no resistance from the garrison of about 350 soldiers and police.
- More than 950 people have died in the conflict so far, Lebanese authorities told. Most have been Lebanese civilians. A sticking point in the U.S.-France plan to end the conflict remains a Lebanese call for Israel's immediate withdrawal from southern Lebanon.
- A video showing Lebanese soldiers cordially offering Israeli troops glasses of tea during the military offensive has been shot, when Israeli troops "took control" of the southern Lebanese town of Marjeyoun.
United Nations
- The UN's top humanitarian official, Jan Egeland, criticised both Israel and Hezbollah for hindering access to southern Lebanon, calling the situation a "disgrace".
- U.N. Secretary-General Kofi Annan pushed the Security Council to come up with a plan by week's end, August 12 to 13, for ending the conflict. In a statement issued early afternoon, Annan's office said he is working "very intensely" on reaching a resolution acceptable to both Israel and Lebanon, and he repeated his call to end the fighting and "save civilians on both sides from the nightmare they have endured for the past four weeks." "The secretary-general believes that it ought to be possible for the Security Council to adopt a resolution by the end of the week," his office said.
- Meanwhile, the United Nations warned of a major food crisis in Lebanon, saying that the displacement of nearly a million people has coincided with the country's main cereal harvest. Of the 915,000 people the U.N. estimates to be internally displaced in Lebanon, 45 percent are children, it said. Fighting has disrupted the delivery of food, fuel and medical supplies and devastated much of the country's infrastructure, and the U.N. said 100,000 people in southern Lebanon won't be receiving vital relief. The emergency coordinator for the U.N. World Food Program, Zlatan Milisic, said no aid has been able to reach areas south of Sidon. A relief convoy planned for Nabatiya was denied IDF approval, said Milisic.
- The main points of a resolution to end fighting between Israel and Hezbollah have been agreed to by the U.S. and France, diplomatic sources said. U.N. observers described a vicious battle in Khiyam, which Israel said is a Hezbollah stronghold, during the Israeli advance to Marjayoun.
United States
- Diplomats meanwhile were trying to reconcile differences over a U.S.-France plan to end the conflict. A sticking point remains a Lebanese call for Israel's immediate withdrawal from southern Lebanon, a move Israel says it won't make without guarantees of its border security. Senior Bush administration officials have said that an August 10 vote at the United Nations is unlikely. John Bolton, the U.S. ambassador to the United Nations, said council members hope to vote on August 11 on the resolution, but "we're not there yet."
- In Washington, senior State Department officials said the United States and France have reached a tentative deal on a resolution that would call for an end to the fighting; an Israeli withdrawal from southern Lebanon, in parallel with the deployment of Lebanese government and U.N. troops; and language on the status of the disputed territory of Shebaa Farms, now under Israeli control. But an outstanding question is whether Lebanon's government will OK a resolution that gives a U.N. mission the mandate to use force, diplomatic sources said.
France
- Diplomats meanwhile were trying to reconcile differences over a U.S.-France plan to end the conflict. A sticking point remains a Lebanese call for Israel's immediate withdrawal from southern Lebanon, a move Israel says it won't make without guarantees of its border security.

== August 11 ==
IDF
- The Israeli army started to broaden its ground offensive and pushed its troops further into southern Lebanon, heading toward the Litani River. The IDF said this was the farthest troops have advanced since the conflict erupted July 12.
See also: 2006 Litani offensive, 2006 Marjayoun convoy, and United Nations Security Council Resolution 1701
- An Israeli soldier was killed in the village of Labuneh overnight, when anti-tank rockets hit a tank and a bulldozer
- Five Israeli soldiers were injured but not seriously during operations in El-Qantarah, east of the port city of Tyre, the Israel Defense Forces said.
- IDF allowed 400 Lebanese security forces, trapped in Marjayoun since August 10, as a result of fire exchanges there between Israel and Hizbullah, to leave the village
- Israeli planes have been reported attacking a convoy fleeing southern Lebanon, causing at least 10 casualties. More than 100 civilian vehicles carrying Lebanese soldiers and police were hit near Chtaura on the west side of the Bekaa Valley The Israeli army confirmed it had attacked the convoy: "The attack was carried out based on a suspicion. It was found to be incorrect," an army spokeswoman said. One of the dead was reported to be a Red Cross worker who went to help people injured in the first attacks
- The IDF also said an Israeli soldier was killed on the ground in Rshaf in an exchange of fire, it carried out more than 80 airstrikes in southern Lebanon.
Hezbollah
- Hezbollah fired several rockets into Israel, wounding two people in the northern city of Haifa, ambulance staff said. Over 160 rockets were reported fired into Israel.
- Hezbollah TV reported that Hezbollah forces destroyed an Israeli gunboat off the coast of Tyre, Lebanon, killing or wounding a crew of 12, the AP reported. The Israeli military denied Hezbollah's claim, the AP said.
- About 150 rockets were launched into northern Israel, Israeli authorities told.
Israel
- Thirty-one days of fighting have killed 123 Israelis, including 40 civilians, and 861 Lebanese, mostly civilians, according to authorities in those countries.
- Israeli Prime Minister Ehud Olmert has ordered the Israeli army to prepare to expand its ground offensive longer inside Lebanon under the belief that the U.N. resolution did not satisfy Israeli security concerns, Olmert's spokesman, Asaf Shariv, told AP. But even as Israeli forces massed along the border with Lebanon, Israeli Foreign Ministry spokesman Mark Regev told AP that Israel was still open to a negotiated solution. "Our action does not exclude a diplomatic option. On the contrary, we are following developments in New York closely," he said.
- The Associated Press, quoting an individual close to the Israeli government, said there's a "good chance" Israel would accept the new cease-fire proposal.
- Despite the expanded ground campaign, the Israeli Security Cabinet was likely to sign off on the six-page U.N. resolution at its meeting on August 13, Israel's ambassador to the United States, Daniel Ayalon, said before the council vote. "I do not want to pre-empt the Cabinet decision, but the language as I see it now – and I'm being careful – if the language of the resolution doesn't change, I view this resolution very positively and, of course, the crux is implementation," Ayalon said. "If this resolution will be enforced, then we solve the problem of Lebanon."
Lebanon
- At least seven Lebanese civilians were reported killed after an airraid in the Akkar province near the Syrian border
- Israeli warplanes attacked Beirut's Dahieh suburb at daybreak. Lebanese media reported several loud explosions within a span of 30 minutes rocked the area
- Israeli airstrikes continued during the day. Jets bombed twice a busy bridge at the Abboudiyeh border crossing into Syria, killing at least 12 people and wounding 18 others, according to hospital sources
- In Lebanon the southern suburbs of Beirut were rocked by at least 11 explosions from Israeli airstrikes.
- Thirty-one days of fighting have killed 123 Israelis, including 40 civilians, and 861 Lebanese, mostly civilians, according to authorities in those countries.
- In the Lebanese capital, Beirut, sources close to the negotiations said the deal of France and the United States with the U.N. on a resolution would create a 400-square-mile (1,000 km^{2}) zone inside Lebanon from which Hezbollah militia would be excluded. Lebanese government officials, cited by the AP, said Lebanese Prime Minister Fouad Siniora was studying the document of the deal and contacting politicians in his country for their input.
- At least six people were killed and 41 others wounded when at least eight Israeli missiles hit a Lebanese Army convoy that had been joined by about 1,000 civilian vehicles, Lebanese security sources said. Red Cross workers told CNN that the convoy, which had consisted of 80 Lebanese security force vehicles and 100 civilian vehicles, had grown to 1,500 vehicles, as more civilians joined along the way. CNN's Michael Ware described the scene of the aftermath as "appalling carnage." Among the dead were a Lebanese army officer and three civilians. Of the 41 injured, 24 were Lebanese soldiers, security sources said. The convoy had left Marjeyoun after fighting there earlier in the day. It was full of civilians from southern Lebanon who had sought shelter at a Lebanese base in Marjeyoun, Lebanese security sources said. It was in the Bekaa Valley town of Kefraya when it was hit, sources said. Many of those vehicles were on fire, and emergency personnel couldn't reach the wounded because of other Israeli airstrikes in the area, sources said. Israel Defense Forces confirmed the attack, carried out "on the suspicion that these were Hezbollah terrorists transporting weaponry" and that it was "along a route forbidden for travel." Whether the convoy, escorted by the United Nations Interim Force in Lebanon, was granted IDF permission to proceed is in dispute. The IDF said Saturday it did not grant permission for the convoy. But a spokesman for the UNIFIL in Lebanon, Milos Strugar, said the Israeli army cleared the convoy for travel along a specific route to Zahlé.Two UNIFIL armored personnel carriers initially escorted the convoy but was no longer with it when the attack occurred. The convoy that was struck had broken off from the main body of vehicles after encountering traffic jams and bottlenecks. "Of the aid convoys that were authorized and coordinated by the IDF throughout this entire period, not a single convoy was hit by IDF fire," the Israeli military said.
- Lebanese U.N. Ambassador Nouhad Mahmoud said any cessation of hostilities should be unqualified, noting, "The Lebanese are not comfortable with the Israeli distinctions of what is defensive and what is offensive."
Russia
- Vitaly Churkin, Russia's UN ambassador, called for a 72-hour humanitarian truce between Israel and Hezbollah while negotiations continued between the United States and France on a draft resolution to end the fighting.
United Nations
- Diplomats at the United Nations and in Beirut stepped up efforts to secure a U.N. resolution for ending the war in Lebanon between Israel and Hezbollah. U.S. Secretary of State Condoleezza Rice is heading to the United Nations to push for a vote at the Security Council, a senior State Department official told. "There is still work to be done, and the secretary will work to close the remaining items," the official said.
- The UN Human Rights Council has voted to launch an inquiry into alleged abuses committed by Israel during its month-long offensive in Lebanon.
- A final text of a resolution that could end the fighting between Israel and Hezbollah in southern Lebanon was distributed to the full U.N. Security Council by the United States and France in a closed-door session that began about 3 p.m. Eastern Standard Time. Key Security Council members are hoping for a vote later in the day. The resolution contains a "very robust mandate" for the use of an international peacekeeping force, a U.N. State Department official said. Under the draft resolution, the number of U.N. troops in the area would be increased from 2,000 to a maximum of 15,000; they would be joined by 15,000 Lebanese troops. The vote took place about five hours later.
- Before the vote, U.N. Secretary-General Kofi Annan said he "wholeheartedly" welcomed the resolution, but he chastised the council for not acting sooner. "I would be remiss if I did not tell you how profoundly disappointed I am that the council did not reach this point much, much earlier," Annan said. "All members of this council must be aware that its inability to act sooner has badly shaken the world's faith in its authority and integrity."
- A UN-resolution to end the conflict has been unanimously accepted by the Security Council. The resolution, drawn up by France and the US, demands a full cessation of all hostilities and the release of abducted Israeli soldiers. UN Secretary General Kofi Annan said he will work with both governments to decide on the exact date and time for a ceasefire. The resolution also authorises the deployment of 15,000 international troops to police the Lebanon-Israel border. The deal also calls for the release of two Israeli soldiers whose capture by guerrillas sparked the conflict that has killed nearly 1,000 people. It lays the groundwork for a more permanent cease-fire agreement.
United States
- Assistant Secretary of State for Near Eastern Affairs David Welch was meeting with Lebanese Prime Minister Fouad Siniora in Beirut to craft a U.N. resolution and put it to a vote as soon as possible, a diplomatic source told.
- France and the United States said they have agreed on a final text of a resolution that could end the fighting between Israel and Hezbollah in southern Lebanon.
- "With this resolution, a new, stronger Lebanon can emerge, with the world's help," said U.S. Secretary of State Condoleezza Rice, who cast the United Nations' vote. "Hezbollah now faces a clear choice between war and peace." "Hezbollah, of course, has ministers in the Lebanese Cabinet, and we've been working with the government of Lebanon, and assuming that the government of Lebanon is making sure that all parties represented in its government will abide by the cease-fire," Rice said.
- The cessation of hostilities includes an end to Israeli "offensive operations." That, according to a senior U.S. State Department official, would mean Israel could continue to respond to Hezbollah attacks. However, the official said that after the resolution takes effect, a reduction of large-scale bombings should follow as well as halt to advancing ground troops.
France
- France's ambassador to Lebanon also met with Siniora.
- France and the United States said they have agreed on a final text of a resolution that could end the fighting between Israel and Hezbollah in southern Lebanon.

== August 12 ==
IDF
- Israel expanded its ground offensive in its deepest thrust yet into southern Lebanon. It was airlifting soldiers into Lebanon but declined to reveal the size of the deployment. The Israeli army was heading toward the Litani River, bombing targets hours after the U.N. Security Council approved a proposal aimed at ending the conflict between Israel and Hezbollah. Israel Radio said units reached the river, The Associated Press reported. Seven Israeli soldiers were killed and 60 others wounded during fighting in the region, an IDF spokesman said. Of the 60, 11 were critically wounded, the spokesman said. South of the Litani in the village of Anduriya, the IDF said it killed more than 10 Hezbollah militants overnight. In addition a Lebanese army soldier was killed and several officers were wounded in airstrikes on western Bekaa overnight, army officials said. The IDF said it carried out more than 80 airstrikes in southern Lebanon overnight.
- Israeli warplanes fired rockets at the village of Rashef hours after a fierce gun battle near the village between Hezbollah-soldiers and Israeli forces. 15 people were feared dead.
- A Lebanese army soldier was killed and several officers were wounded in airstrikes on western Bekaa overnight, army officials said. Other Israeli airstrikes targeted two buildings in Tyre believed to be associated with Hezbollah, Arab-language news media reported. One of the overnight airstrikes hit a power station in the Tyre suburbs, cutting off electricity in the area, Lebanese Broadcasting Corporation reported. News footage showed smoke wafting on the horizon following the airstrikes in the southern port city.
- In Sidon, Israeli airstrikes knocked out a power station and disrupted electricity fed to the surrounding areas, video from Arab-language Lebanese Broadcasting Corporation showed. Lebanese workers labored to repair a road crossing between Lebanon and Syria after Israeli airstrikes made it unusable, Lebanon's Transport and Public Works Minister told.
- The IDF said forces are operating in areas believed to be launching sites for Hezbollah rockets. They said airstrikes destroyed Hezbollah gathering sites, weaponry storage facilities, a bunker near A-Hiam village, nine bridges and access routes to prevent weapons smuggling. It said "over 40 Hezbollah terrorists" had been killed in the last 24 hours.
- Israel's top general said that Israel would continue fighting Hezbollah until it was clear how the U.N. resolution would be put into force, Reuters reported. "The fact that a U.N. resolution was accepted on August 11 doesn't apply immediately on the cease-fire arrangement," Lt. Gen. Dan Halutz said at a briefing at a military base in northern Israel, according to Reuters. "The fact we are increasing our operation is based on the idea that the Israeli defense forces should provide defense to our civilians," he said, according to Reuters. "We will continue to operate until we achieve our aims." In Beirut, Israeli aircraft released anti-Hezbollah leaflets, calling on people to "get rid of the destroyer of Lebanon." "You can recuperate the scent of the cedars if you want," a caption said, referring to the green tree depicted on Lebanon's flag.
- A total of 24 Israeli soldiers were killed in fighting, the IDF said, making it the largest single-day loss of life for the IDF since the fighting began.
- Israel also confirmed a helicopter had been shot down in southern Lebanon, the crew of five missing. It is the first such loss to hostile fire in the conflict.
Israel
- Israel has yet to react formally to the U.N. resolution, which calls for a cease-fire and then a massive increase in U.N. troops in southern Lebanon. The Israeli Security Cabinet is expected to take up the proposal August 13. Israeli Ambassador to the United States Daniel Ayalon said the Cabinet was likely to approve it.
- Israeli U.N. Ambassador Dan Gillerman said it would not be enough for Hezbollah to simply lay down its weapons. The Security Council expects southern Lebanon to be free "of any Hezbollah presence," he said.
- Media reports say Israel plans to stop fighting in Lebanon at 7 am. Monday (midnight ET). But Reuters news agency quoted a senior Israeli official as saying that troops will continue battling Hezbollah in areas where the IDF is operating. Israel said it planned to abide by the resolution, which calls on Israel to halt "offensive" military actions.
- The Israeli Cabinet has indicated it would approve the resolution. Israel has held the Lebanese government accountable for the violence.
- Since the conflict erupted on July 12, nearly 1,000 people have been killed, according to authorities in Lebanon and Israel. Israel said 92 military personnel and 40 civilians had been killed and about 1,000 wounded.
Hezbollah
- Hezbollah fired at least 4 rockets into northern Israel, wounding 2 people
- Hezbollah militants later shot down an Israeli military helicopter in southern Lebanon, the IDF said. Further information, including possible casualties, was not immediately available. Attacks by Hezbollah continued, as well. By 6 p.m. Saturday about 48 rockets landed in northern Israel, 14 of them reaching cities, officials said. Three people received minor injuries, police said.
- Hezbollah's leader stated that the group will abide by the UN Security Council resolution, which calls for a "full cessation of hostilities".
- In his televised address, Nasrallah expressed reservations about the resolution, saying, "When the Israeli aggression stops, then the reaction by the resistance will stop." He charged, that the Security Council-approved resolution is biased toward Israel and that it neglected to blame Israel for what he described as "massacres" and "war crimes" during the monthlong war. Nasrallah said Hezbollah will help refugees return home and will support the Lebanese Army and the U.N. Interim Force in Lebanon. But he said "we are still in a war," and Hezbollah "will continue to defend" itself. "As long as our land is occupied, we will continue the resistance," he said. His statement came as Israeli troops pushed deeper into southern Lebanon, expanding the offensive against Hezbollah.
- The two Hezbollah members told the Lebanese government that the Islamic militia has no intention of disarming south of the Litani River, about 15 miles (24 km) north of the Israel-Lebanon border, a senior Cabinet member said.—A zone the U.N. resolution calls for demilitarizing. Senior Siniora adviser Mohamad Chatah, however, downplayed that report. "There is a national consensus – and Hezbollah has said that it's part of it – that there will be no arms in south Lebanon other than the arms of the state of Lebanon and the U.N.," he said. The Cabinet unanimously approved the resolution. Hezbollah leader Hassan Nasrallah indicated that the two Hezbollah ministers voted for it in a spirit of national unity.
Lebanon
- The Lebanese government, which includes two members of Hezbollah, unanimously approved Security Council Resolution 1701, Prime Minister Fouad Siniora said. Siniora said, according to the U.N.- proposal only the Lebanese Army and U.N. forces would be allowed to bear arms. The announcement followed a meeting of the Lebanese Cabinet, and Siniora said the Cabinet would meet again August 13 to discuss the resolution's implementation, but then postponed the meeting for up to two days to August 15. A Lebanese government minister said the postponement came at the request of parliamentary speaker Nabih Berri, a key negotiator with Hezbollah, to give government officials more time to discuss the plan with Hezbollah. Sources in Berri's office denied the report. The postponement sparked concern worldwide among leaders with high hopes for the resolution. A senior Lebanese government source said Prime Minister Fouad Siniora received calls from U.S. Secretary of State Condoleezza Rice, Egyptian President Hosni Mubarak, French President Jacques Chirac, and U.N. Secretary-General Kofi Annan. The White House confirmed that Rice spoke with Siniora, but a White House spokesman did not know who initiated that call. The State Department had no immediate comment. The senior Lebanese government source said Bush called Siniora as well, but the White House denied that. The source also said Annan told Siniora that if Hezbollah maintains its position against disarmament south of the Litani, an international force can't go into Lebanon.
- Siniora had sharp words for Israel, telling reporters that the Jewish state's decision not to approve the cease-fire immediately gives the Israeli military "a blank check" to continue pounding Lebanon and "targeting civilians." "This is the type of humanity we are getting from the Israelis. This is terror by itself," he said. "Through force, they cannot achieve anything. They have to get back to their senses."
- Shrapnel from missiles fired on the village of Insariyeh, halfway between Sidon and Tyre, hit a vehicle carrying Lebanese journalists working for a Swedish television channel, and one of them was wounded
- Since the conflict erupted on July 12, nearly 1,000 people have been killed, according to authorities in Lebanon and Israel. Of those killed, 880 were Lebanese, most of them civilians, according to Lebanese Internal Security Forces, which also reported 3,529 wounded.
United States
- The United States have said that the Lebanese government doesn't have the capacity to extend its authority into Hezbollah-held territory. Nonetheless, U.S. President Bush welcomed the resolution in his radio address, saying the United States and allies have worked hard to "create the conditions for an enduring cease-fire and prevent armed militias and foreign-sponsored terrorist groups like Hezbollah from sparking another crisis." In an eight-minute call to Siniora on Saturday, Bush "stressed the need to dismantle Hezbollah's state within a state in order to build Lebanese democracy," said National Security Council spokesman Frederick Jones.
United Nations
- A U.N.-brokered cease-fire between Hezbollah and Israel will begin at 8 a.m. (1 a.m. ET) August 14, U.N. Secretary-General Kofi Annan said in a taped statement. Israeli Prime Minister Ehud Olmert and Lebanese Prime Minister Fouad Siniora agreed on the time, Annan said. But it was unclear what effect that will have. On the conflict's deadliest day yet for Israeli soldiers, he urged both sides to stop fighting immediately. "Preferably, the fighting should stop now to respect the spirit and intent of the council decision, the object of which was to save civilian lives, to spare the pain and suffering that the civilians on both sides are living through," Annan said.

== August 13 ==
IDF
- Early at least three Lebanese civilians were killed and seven wounded in an Israeli airstrike on the southern Lebanese town of Ali al-Nahri in the Bekaa Valley, Lebanese hospital sources said, identifying the dead as civilians. Israel has described the locations as being strongholds for the Hezbollah militia.
- Lebanese civil defense officials also reported eight people dead and 16 wounded in an airstrike on the Bekaa Valley town of Brital. Civil defense sources also told CNN of an airstrike on a road between the village of Jammaliya and the city of Baalbek. The sources said there are casualties and that rescue workers were en route. In a parting propaganda shot, Israel promised more of the same if Hezbollah continues to operate from southern Lebanon.
- On the Lebanese-Syrian border, two Lebanese soldiers were wounded when an Israeli airstrike hit their jeep, Lebanese army sources said. In the southern port city of Tyre, Israeli airstrikes sent columns of smoke into the air. Arabic-language news networks reported civilians were killed in the strikes. It were some of the heaviest attacks of the 33-day conflict. In addition, an Israeli missile landed at night in the port area of Tyre in southern Lebanon. The missile attack occurred at about 10:10 p.m. (3:10 pm. ET). The extent of damage or possible casualties was not immediately clear. Power in most of the city was out. Over Tyre, cannon fire from helicopters could be heard, and small-arms fire was heard coming from south of the city.
- Israel pounded targets with heavy missile barrages August 13 looking to inflict maximum damage in the final hours before a cease-fire resolution was to go into effect. "It's time to do all we can to destroy as much as we can of the infrastructure in the next 12 or 13 hours, and then we'll see what is next," former prime minister Ehud Barak told.
- Israel launched airstrikes in Lebanon, hours after U.N. Secretary-General Kofi Annan said a U.N.-brokered cease-fire between Hezbollah and Israel will begin at 8 a.m. (1 a.m. ET) August 14.
- The IDF said it carried out more than 100 aerial attacks targeting Hezbollah militants. It said five soldiers were killed August 13 in heavy fighting against Hezbollah fighters in southern Lebanon. Another 25 soldiers were wounded, including four seriously, the IDF said. The Israeli military reported 143 people Israelis have been killed and more than 1,000 wounded since the conflict started on July 12. According to Israeli police, nearly 4,000 Hezbollah rockets hit northern Israel during the conflict. The IDF said its troops had killed more than 530 Hezbollah fighters, releasing the names of 180 of them.
- IDF reported that they shot down two Hezbollah-drones on their way to Israel, one was brought down over western Galilee, the other over Tyre
- Acknowledging that "the next few days are days of uncertainty," Israeli commander Maj. Gen. Benny Gantz said Israel will adhere to the cease-fire if Hezbollah does not fire at its forces or civilians. "But if fire is renewed against our forces and against the Israeli civilian population, we will be able to and know how to and will not hesitate to operate," said Gantz, the commander of Israeli ground forces.
Israel
- The Israeli Cabinet approved a U.N. cease-fire resolution aimed at stopping the fighting between Israel and Hezbollah that has raged for more than a month. Israeli Foreign Minister Tzipi Livni said that U.N. resolution 1701 is "good for Israel" and "will change the rules of the game in Lebanon and the relationship between Israel and Lebanon as well." During the Cabinet meeting, Israeli Prime Minister Ehud Olmert said that with the resolution, "Hezbollah will no longer be a state within a state in Lebanon," according to the Israeli news Web site Ynet. Israel has made clear it will not immediately pull out, but will wait until other forces arrive to prevent the Hezbollah militia from again taking over the area on Israel's northern border. "We ask that there not be a vacuum, in other words that there not be a situation in which the IDF exits and there remains a vacuum there and the Hezbollah returns to those places where it left, or alternately remains in those places and nothing actually happens," Livni told. Barak said, "It will not be fully quiet – that's the major risk – until the international force will come."
- "We view the Security Council resolution favorably," Trade Minister Isaac Herzog told The Associated Press. To halt "offensive" military actions is our full and unequivocal intention," he said as a member of the Cabinet, which approved U.N. Resolution 1701 on August 13. But Israeli officials also acknowledged it remains unclear what actions could be construed as "offensive." "What if some trucks will come from Syria with new launchers and rockets? If we attack them, some might say it's not defensive," said Barak. "If we don't, it will end up with just another opportunity for Hezbollah to regroup."
Lebanon
- Fighting in the region has left 890 Lebanese dead and more than 3,800 wounded, according to Lebanese Internal Security Forces. Most of the killed people before the bombardments of August 13 were civilians Lebanon said.
- According to Lebanese media, the neighborhoods of Rwais, Mamoora, Gallerie Semaan, Bourj Al-Barajne, and Kafaat were hit. The attacks, which happened just before 3 p.m. (8 a.m. ET), were aimed at Hezbollah's leadership, Lebanese security sources said. None of the militia's top leaders was believed to have been in the area at the time, the security sources said.
- Nouhad Mahmoud, Lebanese representative to the United Nations, countered, "I don't understand why we need this grand finale." He questioned what Israel thinks it could achieve in a matter of hours "that they couldn't achieve in one month." Mahmoud acknowledged that Hezbollah set off the conflict, when its militants crossed into Israel last month, killed three Israeli soldiers and kidnapped two others. "They just started it, and the Israelis took the rest," he said.
Hezbollah
- Hezbollah leader Hassan Nasrallah said that his militia would honor the call for a cease-fire once a deal on the timing was reached.
- Hezbollah pounded targets with heavy missile barrages August 13, looking to inflict maximum damage in the final hours before a cease-fire resolution was to go into effect. It fired more than 250 rockets at Israel, Israel reported. During Hezbollah rocket attacks on Safed and Shlomi in Israel, one Israeli civilian was killed and seven were wounded, ambulance services said.

== August 14 ==
Lebanon
- The ceasefire went into effect at 8 a.m. (0500 GMT, 1 a.m. ET).
- Hours after the cease-fire took effect, thousands of refugees started to return to their homes. Lebanese security sources told at least 11 returning refugees, including children, had been injured by unexploded ammunition lying around towns and villages in southern Lebanon. Unexploded ordnance killed two people and wounded nine others, Lebanese civil defense officials said.
- In Tyre, people who had spent days or weeks in cramped, uncomfortable shelters in the mountains, with food and water running low, were anxious to get to their homes and find out what had happened to them. Lebanon's interior ministry issued a statement urging civilians to stay away from their homes until army engineers could inspect them for unexploded cluster bombs or artillery, the AP said.
- As many as 300,000 refugees are expected to return over the next few days to the area where many buildings, roads and bridges have been destroyed. The Lebanese army set up checkpoints along the main roads in an effort to control traffic.
IDF
- Two hours before the start of the ceasefire Israel papered Beirut with propaganda leaflets, blaming Hezbollah for bringing "destruction, displacement and death" to Lebanon and calling the militant group a puppet of Iran and Syria. "Hezbollah, with it isolationist, reckless and deceitful policies has brought you many achievements: destruction, displacement, and death," the leaflets dropped over Beirut said. "Can you pay this price again? "Know that the Israel Defense Forces will return and will act with all necessary might against any terrorist act coming from Lebanon that touches Israel."
- Just before the ceasefire took effect, Israeli missiles struck a van on the outskirts of Baalbek, killing seven people.
- Just hours into the cease-fire, the Israeli military reported four clashes between Hezbollah and Israeli ground forces in which four Hezbollah fighters were killed. In one incident, Israeli forces shot an armed man who approached Israeli troops in the village of Farun, the IDF said.
- Israeli troops in south Lebanon opened fire on a group of armed Hezbollah fighters "approaching in a threatening way", and hit one person. The clash, near the village of Haddatha, happened about three hours after the cease-fire came into effect. There were no details on the other two incidents.
- Israel promised to keep a tight rein on the region with military officials saying the army will continue enforcing the air and sea embargo on Lebanon. Israeli military officials said some of its forces were withdrawing from southern Lebanon but gave no details. "IDF forces are still operating on a defensive basis as Hezbollah terrorists are still in the area," an IDF statement said.
- "The IDF will respect the cease-fire, but will continue to defend its forces and the citizens of Israel," an Israel Defense Forces statement said. "IDF forces will remain situated in southern Lebanon until responsibility over the area is handed over to the Lebanese army" and U.N. forces. It continued to warn residents not to travel south of the Litani "until Lebanese army and UNIFIL forces assume responsibility for the area, in accordance with U.N. Security Council Resolution 1701."
- IDF reported 167 deaths, including 114 military personnel and 53 civilians, and said 865 people had been wounded.
- Troops began their pullout late night, according to the Israel Defense Forces.
United Nations
- Israeli aircraft targeted a Palestinian faction in the Ein el-Hilweh refugee camp in Saida with two missiles. The missiles, fired into a civilian residential area, killed UNRWA staff member Mr. Abdel Saghir
- Despite four clashes between Israeli forces and Hezbollah fighters, U.N. Secretary-General Kofi Annan said the cease-fire agreement "appears to be generally holding." But both sides said they weren't backing down.
- In southern Lebanon some 1,200 cars had crossed the main route from Beirut to Nabatiye in just an hour, a U.N. team reported. Along the Syrian border, some 4,500 people had crossed back into Lebanon, another U.N. team said. Some took advantage of a newly repaired bridge over the Litani River, just north of Tyre, which is also speeding up the arrival of humanitarian aid.
- Hours after the cease-fire took effect, senior military representatives from the Lebanese and Israeli armies met separately with the head of U.N. forces in southern Lebanon to discuss how to implement the agreement, according to a U.N. statement. The meetings with UNIFIL chief Gen. Alain Pellegrini took place at a U.N. position at a southern border crossing near Ras Naqoura, Lebanon, around noon (5 a.m. ET), the U.N. said. The U.N. statement said the talks were "open" and "fruitful."
Israel
- Israeli Prime Minister Ehud Olmert said that Israel would continue to go after Hezbollah. "We will continue to pursue them everywhere and at all times," he said in a speech to the Knesset. "We have no intention of asking anyone's permission." Olmert said that the death toll in more than a month of fighting stands at 159 Israelis, including civilians and soldiers. He made it clear that if Hezbollah does not disarm, Israel will continue with what he termed "a long, hard, arduous, complex fight." Olmert also said he was appointing Ofer Dekel, former deputy head of Israel's security service, to lead efforts to secure the release of two soldiers Hezbollah captured in a July 12 cross-border raid.
- Although no rockets were fired into northern Israel August 14, only few Israelis who fled the war were seen returning, and Israel's government advised them to stay away for now to see whether the truce held, AP reported. Stores that had been closed for weeks began to reopen in Haifa, Israel, and traffic lights began working again in Kiryat Shmona, the AP said, but there was no mass influx of refugees.
Hezbollah
- Hezbollah's leader, Hassan Nasrallah, said the militia would consider Israeli troops legitimate targets until they leave, The Associated Press reported.
- In a TV address at night, Hezbollah leader Hassan Nasrallah gave mixed signals on disarmament. While saying he was willing to discuss the issue, he also said he does not believe Lebanese troops are yet capable of defending the country.
United States
- The White House urged both sides to respect the newly imposed cease-fire in their month-long war as Bush conferred with senior advisers about national security problems around the world. On his first day back from vacation, Bush traveled to the Pentagon to meet with senior advisers, including Defense Secretary Donald Rumsfeld, Vice President Dick Cheney and others. Later, he was to travel to the State Department to meet with Secretary of State Condoleezza Rice. He also was having lunch with a group of people identified by the White House as experts on Iraq. Three sessions were scheduled at the State Department, all with Rice attending but a shifting cast of experts on terrorism, foreign aid and the volatile Middle East.
- "Right now, what's won is diplomacy has won," White House press secretary Tony Snow said, referring to the U.N. resolution that stopped the fighting. He said it wasn't easy to reach the agreement and that there was a "diplomatic taffy-pull as we tried to figure how to get to the resolution that all sides would support." Snow said it was obvious that Hezbollah had been weakened by the battle—although Israel did not achieve its objective of delivering a knockout blow to the guerrilla group. He said the cease fire's success "will require placing on the northern border of Lebanon somebody who is capable of handling security in such a way as to intercept, interrupt and, with any luck, stop the transport into Lebanon of arms from Iran and Syria." "We hope that everybody will stay true to the cease-fire and that the government of Lebanon, again, will be able to have the credibility," Snow said. "But, you know, a piece of paper outlines the way forward, but a lot of times that still has to be conducted by people on the ground," the press secretary said. "The people also within Lebanon, the Lebanese government has a role to play, the governments of Syria and Iran have a role to play, Hezbollah has a role to play, the Israelis have a role to play. And we'll have to see how all those things work out in the hours, days and weeks ahead."
- Bush made a brief statement at the opening of his meeting at the Pentagon. "We live in troubled times, but I'm confident in our capacity to not only protect the homeland but in our capacity to leave behind a better world," Bush said. "It's very important for the American people to know that we're constantly thinking about how to secure the homeland, protect our interests and use all assets available to do our jobs," the president said. The list of challenges facing Bush spread far beyond the fighting between Hezbollah and Israel.
- President Bush called the U.N. resolution that took effect hours earlier an "important step that will help bring an end to the violence" between Israel and Hezbollah. "Hezbollah suffered a defeat in this crisis," Bush told reporters. "There's going to be a new power in the south of Lebanon," he said, referring to the U.N. force that will assist the Lebanese army in taking control of the area. "America recognizes that civilians in Lebanon and Israel have suffered from the current violence, and we recognize that responsibility for this suffering lies with Hezbollah," Bush said. "Responsibility for the suffering of the Lebanese people also lies with Hezbollah's state sponsors, Iran and Syria." President Bush blamed Hezbollah, and its supporters in Iran and Syria, for the war, which he said was "part of a broader struggle between freedom and terror."

== August 15 ==
Hezbollah
- Up to 10 Katusyha rockets were fired southwards, from areas north of the Litani river, during the night but did not cross the Israeli border. No injuries were reported.
- Hezbollah leader Sheikh Hassan Nasrallah, said that Hezbollah had achieved a "strategic, historic victory" against Israel. Nasrallah also promised during a videotaped speech on Hezbollah's Al-Manar TV that the group would help Lebanese victims rebuild their homes.
- Several small clashes between Hezbollah fighters and Israeli soldiers were also reported, in which at least nine Hezbollah militants were killed. But so far, there have been no large-scale violations of the U.N.-brokered cease-fire.
IDF
- Israeli forces did not respond to the rockets fired by Hezbollah during the night, as none of them crossed the Israeli-Lebanese-border.
- Several small clashes between Hezbollah fighters and Israeli soldiers were also reported, in which at least six Hezbollah militants were killed. But so far, there have been no large-scale violations of the U.N.-brokered cease-fire. About four mortar rounds were fired inside southern Lebanon after the cease-fire, according to the IDF. Explosions were heard in southern Lebanon after nightfall, but the IDF attributed them to the ongoing destruction of Hezbollah weapons caches and unexploded rockets.
- IDF started its withdrawal from Lebanon. At 6:00 a.m. a paratrooper-unit operating in the central zone of southern Lebanon returned to Israeli territory Israeli forces will complete their pullout from southern Lebanon within 10 days, giving way to U.N. and Lebanese forces, Israel's army chief of staff, Lt. Gen. Dan Halutz, said.
- At least 159 deaths have been reported in Israel, the Israel Defense Forces said.
United Nations
- Following the meeting between IDF and UNIFIL representatives, it was decided that a UNIFIL-force will begin deployment throughout southern Lebanon within 24 to 48 hours from August 14). Immediately after the UNIFIL force's arrival, Lebanese army units will also start their move into southern Lebanon, even if Israel and Lebanon have yet to hold any formal contacts to coordinate the transfer of control over the territory. The troops will be deployed in what U.N. peacekeeping officials described as a "rolling exercise" replacing Israeli troops with Lebanese and U.N. troops starting from the northeast at Marjayoun and moving southwest.
- The head of the UN peacekeeping force in Lebanon, Major General Alain Pellegrini of France, stated: "The old UNIFIL is dead, and now it's the new one that is starting," he said. "Its attitude, and thus its means of action, are changing. It will be totally different from the one we see now." While the first 200 U.N. troops could arrive by August 21, UNIFIL chief Maj. Gen. Alain Pellegrini said it could be November 2006 before the full contingent arrives. "To pass from 2,000 to 15,000 is enormous," Pellegrini told.
- Spokesman Milos Strugar said U.N. troops are patrolling day and night and will grow in number. They have begun de-mining the area and disposing of unexploded ordnance.
France
- A force of 2,000 French soldiers that already is in place in Lebanon, having arrived a number of weeks ago to evacuate French citizens from the fighting. The first French forces were expected to arrive in southern Lebanon within 10 days.
Lebanon
- Lebanese forces were making preparations to move into southern Lebanon to try to prevent a return of the violence that claimed more than 1,000 lives on both sides of the border. The first of 15,000 Lebanese forces will begin moving into areas south of the Litani River by August 17, Lebanese officials said. "Everything is in preparation now, politically and practically on the ground," Nouhad Mahmoud, Lebanese U.N. Ambassador, told.
- Thousands of Lebanese civilians displaced by the 34-day conflict clogged southbound roads, trying to return home despite warnings from the Israeli military that it was not yet safe. Because most of the bridges over the Litani River were destroyed in more than four weeks of airstrikes, some people waded through the water, including mothers carrying their babies. Lebanese officials have said 850,000 people were displaced by the conflict.
- Mohamad Chatah, an adviser to Lebanese Prime Minister Fouad Siniora, said his government's goal is to persuade Hezbollah to become "a normal political party, having the same rights and obligations as others." "Hezbollah says that can happen," Chatah said. "We cannot have two armies anymore."
- The conflict resulted in 908 Lebanese deaths, authorities said. Lebanon's security forces reported 3,877 wounded since Israel began its military campaign. A girl in the area of Nabatiye was injured by explosives a day earlier, the AP said.
Israel
- In Israel, where 1 million people fled their homes for shelter in the south, there was no quick return northward.
- Maariv reported that Chief of Staff Dan Halutz sold a large portfolio of shares hours after the kidnapping of the Israeli soldiers. Haaretz quotes military sources to the effect that Halutz will be forced to resign as a result.
- Forty-one Israeli civilians died in Hezbollah rocket attacks, during the conflict, and more than 1,000 Israelis were wounded, including 600 civilians, according to the IDF.
Syria
- Syrian President Bashar al-Assad said there could be no peace while Bush is president, according to an Associated Press report. "This is an administration that adopts the principle of pre-emptive war that is absolutely contradictory to the principle of peace," the AP quoted Al-Assad as saying in a speech. "Consequently, we don't expect peace soon or in the foreseeable future." "Israel is an enemy [and] does not want peace, because peace will impose on Israel to return the Arab lands," Al-Assad said. He said there could be no peace without Hezbollah.
Iran
- Iranian President Mahmoud Ahmadinejad said Hezbollah was victorious against Israel, despite the immense damage inflicted on Lebanon. "Those who said our army is unbreakable and undefeatable and (vowed to) create major destruction within 30 days were defeated against the power of the young people," Ahmadinejad said. "And these young people managed to raise the flags of victory across Lebanon." Some Iranians in the audience waved photos of Hezbollah leader Hassan Nasrallah during the speech. Ahmadinejad blamed the United States and Britain—both permanent members of the U.N. Security Council—for standing in the way of a cease-fire and said that "they should be punished." He also called on "whoever participated in the destruction of Lebanon" as well as the United Nations to compensate the Lebanese "for what happened."
United States
- John Bolton, U.S. ambassador to the United Nations, said that diplomats "are working hard" to determine which countries will make up the enhanced UNIFIL force.

== August 16 ==
Lebanon
- The Lebanese army begins its deployment in southern Lebanon with a smaller symbolic force. This is the first time in about two decades that the Lebanese army has positioned itself along the border with Israel.
- Although the cease-fire took effect August 14, the death toll in Lebanon continued to climb, with bodies being discovered as Israeli and Hezbollah forces pulled back. Lebanese Internal Security Forces reported a total of 989 fatalities since the conflict began July 12, including 56 bodies retrieved from the village of Srifa. In a sign of lingering danger in south Lebanon, security officials said an explosive detonated in the town of Nabatiye, killing a 20-year-old man, The Associated Press reported. The victim, Ali Turkieh, stepped on the bomb outside his family home.
- The Lebanese government considered how to make the U.N.-brokered cease-fire work. Senior political sources told the Lebanese Cabinet would convene to discuss cease-fire implementation, and is expected to look at several options, including integrating Hezbollah fighters into the Lebanese army. That option has been rejected by Hezbollah, the sources said.
- The Lebanese Cabinet unanimously approved the deployment of 15,000 troops to southern Lebanon beginning August 17, a minister told, moving to take control of a region Hezbollah militants have effectively controlled since 2000. The measure was approved to speed up the deployment of United Nations forces and the withdrawal of Israeli forces. Lebanese Prime Minister Fouad Siniora said it was time for the Lebanese government to take control of southern Lebanon from the Hezbollah militia. In a televised address, he praised Hezbollah guerrillas for what they accomplished on the battlefield. But he added that once Lebanese troops deploy, "There will be no other weapons other than those of the Lebanese government."
- A video showing Lebanese soldiers cordially offering Israeli troops glasses of tea during the military offensive earlier this month has hit Israeli and Hezbollah airwaves. The video, shot by Israelis on August 10, when Israeli troops "took control" of the southern Lebanese town of Marjeyoun, aired on Israel's Channel 2. Hezbollah's al-Manar TV network and pro-Hezbollah NEW TV then picked up the video and condemned the Lebanese soldiers as deserters. In the video, two Israeli tanks roll up to the gate of the Marjeyoun garrison, where a white surrender flag flutters outside the barracks. Inside, Lebanese soldiers hold trays with glasses of tea, which they offer to the Israelis. The encounter appears merely social. However, it is possible that unpleasant parts of the video were deleted during editing. After the video aired, the Lebanese interior ministry ordered the arrest of the base commander, Gen. Adnan Daoud, according to The Associated press. Lebanon does not recognize Israel and forbids its citizens any contact with Israelis. At one point in the video, Daoud and an Israeli soldier have the following exchange: Daoud: "Don't we need to tell our bosses?" Israeli soldier: "Tell whoever you want." Daoud: "We need to brief them on what happened." Israeli soldier: "We briefed (U.S. President) Bush. You brief whoever you want." Daoud: "We need to brief Bush too." Tape reflects the Lebanese army's hands-off policy in the fighting between Israel and the Lebanese militant group Hezbollah. Lebanon didn't want to turn the conflict into a war between it and Israel. The actions, as depicted in a video where parts may have been deleted and edited, could suggest the Lebanese army is weak and unable to take southern Lebanon back from Hezbollah without help. There are conflicting reports of what happened at Marjeyoun, a largely Christian town. Lebanese intelligence said the Israeli troops met no resistance when they entered the town. Arab-language network Al-Jazeera has quoted Hezbollah as saying "violent battles" took place with their militants, and Arab news networks Al-Manar and Al-Arabiya reported at least two Israeli tanks were destroyed in the fighting. Lebanese acting Interior Minister Ahmed Fatfat defended the Lebanese forces at the barracks, which he said included 350 Lebanese internal security officers and soldiers from the army's intelligence unit. "This force is not on a combat mission. This force has simple individual weapons to act as a police force. They don't have tanks or missile launchers. This is a force that was assigned to support the residents and protect them, provide them with humanitarian assistance," he said. Other critics view the Lebanese army's general as having committed an act of treason.
United Nations
- The United Nations plans to deploy 3,000 to 3,500 troops to southern Lebanon within 10 to 15 days as a "vanguard force", said Hédi Annabi, deputy director of U.N. peacekeeping. Once in place, the U.N. troops—an expanded version of the existing border-monitoring mission, the U.N. Interim Force in Lebanon—will work with Lebanese troops to create a demilitarized zone between the Litani River and the "blue line"—the Israel-Lebanon border. "Everybody is keen to implement this rapidly," said French Maj. Gen. Alain Pellegrini, the commander of U.N. Interim Forces in Lebanon. "The IDF want to leave as soon as possible, and the Lebanese Army is very conscious of its responsibility and wants to take over very, very quickly," Pellegrini said. "I think all the process could be done within 10 days."
- Countries like Italy, Malaysia, Indonesia and Turkey have expressed interest in taking part, and its representatives attended technical meetings at U.N. headquarters. But the countries have not pledged troops as of August 15. France is expected to make a significant offer to bolster the 1,990 UNIFIL troops, but Paris has not confirmed the scope of its contribution. U.N. officials said more formal announcements are expected after meetings with the French on August 16. The foreign ministers of several countries that could contribute peacekeeping troops to southern Lebanon, including France, Turkey, Malaysia and Pakistan, met in Beirut. French Foreign Minister Philippe Douste-Blazy called on Israel to stop its air and sea embargo on Lebanon. "At the same time we ask the Lebanese government to do everything in its power to make sure that there is no arms trafficking," the French minister said. Israeli Foreign Ministry spokesman Mark Regev said the blockade is necessary until the peacekeeping force is in place to prevent the Islamic militant group from rearming, AP reported.
- U.N. Secretary-General Kofi Annan will send two envoys – Terje Roed Larsen and Vijay Nambiar—to Lebanon and Israel to follow up on the implementation of the cease-fire resolution, the United Nations announced. Annan met with Israeli Foreign Minister Tzipi Livni, who said she discussed Israel's desire for a mixed force of troops from European and Muslim nations. She said Israel fully supports the U.N.-brokered cease-fire with Hezbollah and that the "ball is now in the court of the government of Lebanon" to ensure no armed militias operate in southern Lebanon.
- The U.N. World Food Program appealed for more money, warning that a severe lack of funds for its logistics operation in Lebanon was threatening to halt its aid efforts.
- A top U.N. official warned that U.N. members need to step up and contribute troops to the peacekeeping mission in southern Lebanon if the cease-fire is to hold. "Every moment we delay is a moment of risk that the fighting could re-erupt," Deputy Secretary-General Mark Malloch Brown told representatives of nations considering deployments. He said UNIFIL would not be involved in a large-scale disarmament of Hezbollah. So far, Bangladesh has offered a potential contribution of two mechanized infantry battalions comprising about 1,500–2,000 troops. Indonesia has offered a mechanized battalion and a company of engineers, with Malaysia and Nepal each volunteering a mechanized battalion. Denmark has offered to send two ships to patrol the Lebanese coast. Also considering sending troops are Italy, Spain, Egypt, Belgium and Morocco.
IDF
- Israel's forces will not leave Lebanon until a U.N.-led multinational force arrives, "even if it takes months," Israel Defense Forces Chief of Staff Dan Halutz said.
Hezbollah
- Hezbollah has agreed to disarm its forces south of the Litani River, but will not pull its forces out of southern Lebanon where its members live. "Hezbollah individuals are people who live in the south and they will not leave their homes and villages, but an armed Hezbollah will not be in the south," said Mohamad Chatah, a senior adviser to Lebanese Prime Minister Fouad Siniora. U.N. Resolution 1701 prohibits all armed militias from operating in southern Lebanon, but does not specify whether the militias should disarm or pull out of the region.
Israel
- Israeli Deputy Prime Minister Shimon Peres said that Israel has opened its airspace to planes from Arab countries carrying humanitarian aid to Lebanon. Israel normally won't allow overflights from Arab countries with whom it doesn't have diplomatic relations. "Whenever we are asked, we agreed, as long as we are convinced" they're legitimate, Peres said.
- Israel's government named a former military chief of staff to investigate how the conflict was handled. Observers have called the military campaign hasty, badly planned and too reliant on air power to destroy Hezbollah. The committee plans to deliver a report in three weeks, the defense ministry said.

== August 17 ==
Lebanon
- About 6,000 Lebanese troops moved south across the Litani River, reclaiming territory taken earlier by the Israeli army. Between 1,800 and 2,000 more Lebanese troops were expected to arrive in the southern port city of Tyre by midday. Beirut's airport also reopened. A flight from Amman, Jordan, was the first to arrive since Israeli warplanes and gunboats destroyed the airport's three runways early in the 34-day conflict. Two more flights, from Amman and London, are scheduled to land later carrying passengers, members of the press and humanitarian aid, an airport official said. British Airways said it expects to resume flights to Beirut by next week.
- The detritus of war, including the occasional unexploded bomb, litters the streets and such hazards slowed the evacuation of the wounded and deliveries of food and fuel to people in the south, officials told The Associated Press.
- A top Lebanese lawmaker slammed the Syrian government for "promoting discord in Lebanon", denounced "Israeli aggression" and its "war machine," and praised the "patriotic" Lebanese troop deployment in the south. Saad Hariri—leader of the top Lebanese parliamentary bloc and son of the slain prime minister Rafik Hariri—made the remarks while speaking to supporters in Beirut.
IDF
- The Israeli military said early that half the area south of the Litani had already been turned over to U.N. Interim Forces in Lebanon, which currently has about 2,000 troops in southern Lebanon. Today's transfer was "conditional on the reinforcement of UNIFIL and the ability of the Lebanese Army to take effective control of the area," the Israel Defense Forces said in a statement.
- Israel's military chief of staff is fending off criticism and calls for his resignation in the wake of news he dumped stock at the conflict's outset. Lt. Gen. Dan Halutz, the head of the IDF, admitted selling about $28,000 worth of his stocks within three hours of Hezbollah's kidnapping of two Israeli soldiers—the action that sparked the conflict. Israel's stock market slid sharply in the days after fighting erupted. In a news conference in Tel Aviv, Halutz said the stock sale was unrelated to the outbreak of war and criticized the disclosure of his personal financial information.
United Nations
- Under the terms of the U.N.-brokered peace agreement, U.N. forces will eventually number 15,000 in southern Lebanon and could comprise troops from France, Turkey, Malaysia and Pakistan.
Israel
- Israeli Vice Premier Shimon Peres said Israel would be out of Lebanon within "weeks" if Lebanese forces arrive in the southern part of the country. During the conflict, Peres said, Israeli believes it destroyed about a third of Hezbollah's missiles, including all of its long-range missiles.

== August 18 ==
Lebanon
- The army hopes to have all 15,000 troops deployed by this morning, an army official said. Residents of the southern town of Shebaa, Lebanon, greeted Lebanese troops with cheers and the national red and white flag, the first time such forces have deployed to the region in decades. Residents of Shebaa, who live near the disputed Shebaa Farms area now occupied by Israel, danced in the streets, among Lebanese military vehicles. Under terms of the cease-fire agreement, Israeli would give up Shebaa Farms to Lebanon on an unspecified date. "I feel safer now," said Shadi Shammas, whom AP described as a 30-year-old Marjeyoun native. "The army before was not like now. Now, if Hezbollah has guns, the army can take them, and that wasn't the case before." "Today is a new beginning for us in south Lebanon," AP quoted George Najm, a 23-year-old from nearby Qlaia, as saying. "We'll need some time to feel safe, but it's a great start."
- Lebanese troops in 10 armored carriers mounted on flatbed trucks drove across a newly installed metal bridge over the Litani River at dawn, escorted by several military vehicles, according to Associated Press. The bridge was built by the army to replace a structure that was bombed by Israeli warplanes. "There will be no confrontation between the army and brothers in Hezbollah. ... That is not the army's mission," Information Minister Ghazi Aridi said after the two-hour Cabinet meeting, according to AP. "They are not going to chase or, God forbid, exact revenge" on Hezbollah.
- In the latest figures, Lebanese Internal Security Forces reported 1,068 people were killed during 34-days of fighting between Israel and Hezbollah, and another 4,054 people were injured.
- "The Lebanese Armed Forces completed the process of deployment inside the territory vacated earlier by the IDF in the general areas of Cheeba, Hasbaiya, Kafer Chouba, Kafer Hamman, Rachaya, Hebbariye and Al Fradis.
Israel
- Israel objects to the inclusion of countries, Malaysia and Indonesia, that do not have diplomatic ties with Israel in a planned UN force for southern Lebanon. Israel has also rejected the participation of Bangladesh. Israel noted that the three do not recognize the existence of Israel. Indonesia, however, insists on sending troops. Its Foreign Ministry spokesman Desra Percaya stressed that Indonesian troops would be in Lebanon, not Israel. "Our troops there would be part of a multinational force under the command and control of the U.N.," Percaya told. "The deployment of the troops is a corrective action as a result of the Israeli military aggression," Percaya said. Indonesia has strongly criticized Israel's military action against Hezbollah targets in Lebanon. Indonesia reportedly plans to contribute 1,000 troops to the force, which is expected to be around 13,000.
- Israeli Foreign Ministry spokesman Mark Regev told Associated Press that Israel is keeping its commitments in the U.N. cease-fire resolution and expects Lebanon to do the same. "That resolution clearly calls for the creation of a Hezbollah-free zone south of the Litani River, and anything less would mean that the resolution is not being implemented," Regev told AP.
IDF
- Israeli military jets, helicopters and drones had circled over an area, 60 km (37 mi) east of Beirut. They came under anti-aircraft fire but had not been hit and had not opened fire themselves.
United Nations
- The United Nations is warning member nations that it should provide troops to the peacekeeping force if the cease-fire is to hold. After a meeting with representatives from 49 countries that could potentially contribute troops, three predominantly Muslim countries – Bangladesh, Indonesia and Malaysia—offered a few battalions of infantrymen. But European nations have been reluctant to commit their own troops. France has offered 200 extra troops, while Germany offered only a naval and aerial force to secure Lebanon's borders. In Rome, Italy's government formally approved a plan to send up to 3,000 troops to Lebanon, the prime minister's office said. The troops have been ready to deploy for some time but the Italian government is waiting until they receive guidance from the United Nations, Italian defense officials said.
- Since the cease-fire took effect, about 400,000 displaced Lebanese civilians have returned to the southern suburbs of Beirut and areas in the south, U.N. Secretary-General Kofi Annan said in a report to the Security Council. He has appealed for member states to provide peacekeeping troops for Lebanon, assuring them the U.N. force will not "wage war" on Israel, Lebanon, or Hezbollah militants. In the report Annan said he is "encouraged by the positive first steps." But he stressed that much more needs to be done. "I would caution that the situation is still very fragile," he said. Annan added that humanitarian aid needs to accelerate in south Lebanon as more people return home so that their food, shelter and medical needs can be met.
Hezbollah
- Hezbollah has started handing out cash payments to Lebanese civilians whose houses were damaged or destroyed by Israeli bombing, a spokesman said. Hajj Ghassan Darwish of Hezbollah said in the southern suburbs of Beirut cash handouts of $12,000 were given to civilians who had lost their homes during the Israeli attacks, and smaller amounts to those whom houses were damaged.

== August 19 ==
IDF
- Israeli forces tried to penetrate the Hezbollah town Boudai about 3 am, swooping in on helicopters deep into the Bekaa Valley 60 miles (97 km) from the Israeli border. The Israeli military later said the commandos were trying to interdict Iranian weapons being smuggled to guerrillas from Syria. The Israelis lost one soldier and one later died of his wounds. Three Hezbollah fighters were wounded.
See also: Operation_Sharp_and_Smooth § The_second_raid, and United Nations Security Council Resolution 1701
Israel
- "The cease-fire is based on (U.N. resolution) 1701 which calls for an international arms embargo against Hezbollah," Israeli Foreign Ministry spokesman Mark Regev said. "In the absence of that presence, arms transfers to Hezbollah are a clear violation of 1701 and Israel is entitled to respond. When the international forces and the Lebanese Army are enforcing the embargo, Israeli action becomes superfluous." Israel won't accept "a cease-fire in which Hezbollah can use that cease-fire just as a timeout to regroup and rearm and prepare for the next round," said Regev. "Israel would not have to do these sort of operations if the international forces and the Lebanese forces were following through on their commitment ... preventing these arms shipments for Hezbollah.
Lebanon
- Lebanon's prime minister accused Israel of violating the UN-brokered ceasefire and said he would take up the issue with Kofi Annan, the UN secretary-general: "The landing carried out by the Israeli occupation forces today in the Bekaa was a flagrant violation of the cessation of hostilities announced by the Security Council," Fuad Saniora said in a statement.
- In figures updated, Lebanese Internal Security Forces reported 1,069 people were killed in Lebanon during the 34-day conflict with Israel, with another 4,055 injured.
Hezbollah
- Hezbollah was sticking by the cease-fire, Lebanon's Defense Minister Elias Murr told. Meanwhile, Hassan Hobballaha, a Hezbollah member of the Lebanese Parliament, called the Bouday- move "proof that the Israeli enemy is still carrying on with its aggression...and that it doesn't care about the resolutions taken by the U.N. Security Council. "As we have stressed before, it is attacking Lebanon and has greediness in this country," he said. "Therefore we do not consider what happened as new for the enemy, but the resistance is still insisting that it will fight against any Israeli attempt."
United Nations
- The U.N. Interim Force in Lebanon said the process of troop transition in southern Lebanon continued. "The Israeli Army withdrawal and the deployment of the Lebanese Army shall continue in the coming days in accordance with the plan and timeline agreed during a trilateral meeting of the Force Commander UNIFIL and the senior representatives of the Lebanese and Israeli Army."
- Fifty French military engineers arrived in Naqoura, the first new soldiers to bolster the UN peacekeeping force.
- Annan called on "all parties to respect strictly the arms embargo, exercise maximum restraint, avoid provocative actions and display responsibility in implementing resolution 1701," the statement by his spokesman said. "All such violations of Security Council resolution 1701 endanger the fragile calm that was reached after much negotiation and undermine the authority of the Government of Lebanon," the statement added.
- Annan spoke with both Israeli Prime Minister Ehud Olmert and Lebanon's Fouad Siniora, the spokesman said. Annan instructed both governments to provide to the Security Council "daily reports of compliance," the statement said. During his discussion with Olmert, Annan said he had received complaints about Israel Defense Forces activity in Lebanon, specifically the Bekaa Valley raid on Saturday, according to Israeli government officials. The two also discussed progress in the formation of the agreed-upon international U.N. peacekeeping force in southern Lebanon, Israeli government officials said. Their discussion coincided with the arrival by boat of 50 French troops at the southern Lebanese city of Naqoura, the first contingent of international reinforcements since the cease-fire went into effect August 14. Meanwhile, a U.N. delegation met with Siniora and other Lebanese officials, including Murr and parliament Speaker Nabih Berri, to discuss the means of implementing Security Council Resolution 1701.
- As of today, a U.N. appeal for Lebanon was 54 percent funded, with contributions of almost $89 million
United States
- In Washington, a White House spokeswoman said the Bush administration took "note" of Israel's statement concerning the Bouday- raid. "We note that the prevention of the resupply of weapons to Hezbollah by Iran and Syria is a key provision of United Nations Security Council Resolution 1701," said Jeannie Mamo. "And the incident underscores the importance of quickly deploying the enhanced UNIFIL."
