= Kfar Hamam =

Kfar Hamam كفرحمام
- Municipality
- Location within Lebanon
- Coordinates: 33°20′35.59″N 35°40′42.09″E
- Country: Lebanon
- Governorate: Nabatieh Governorate
- District: Hasbaya District
- Time zone: UTC+2 (EET)
  - Summer (DST): UTC+3 (EEST)
- Dialing code: +961

Kfar Hamam (Arabic: كفرحمام, romanized: Kfarḥamām, also Kafarhamam, Kafrhamam, Kfarhamam, Kafar Hamam) is a municipality located in the Arqoob region in the Hasbaya District in Southern Lebanon, which lies on the eastern side of the Nabatieh Governorate. Kfar Hamam is bounded by Al-Mari village from the south, Al-Hebbariyah village from the north, Kfar Shouba from the east, and Rashaya al-Foukhar from the west. It is 117 kilometers (73 mi) away from Beirut, and around 850 meters (2,790 ft) above sea level. According to the latest electoral lists, the population of the village today is about 3,500, of which only a very small minority reside in the village.

The village has a strategic location in the Hermon mountains of Lebanon, as it overlooks the Upper Galilee of Israel and is very close by to the Golan Heights and the Shebaa farms. Its importance also lies in the fact that its very close to an intersection of the borders of three countries; those being Lebanon, Israel, and Syria.

== History ==
Kfar Hamam is originally a Syriac word. Kfar means house and hamam means peace, hence Kfarhamam means "the house of peace". The village is about 500 years old and has been destroyed and rebuilt many times since the 1970s. Many people had escaped the village due to the security problems of the region, until in the late 1970s the village was fully evacuated for a certain period of time. Fifty percent of these evacuees had to immigrate to Brazil and Canada to earn their living; most of which still have not returned until this day. Even today, the villagers of Kfarhamam usually live in foreign countries/cities due to the many effects of the former Israeli occupation and the ongoing Lebanese Governments' negligence towards the Arqoob region in which the village lies.

In 1838, during the Ottoman era, Eli Smith noted the population of Kfarhamam as being Sunni Muslim.

Important intellectual figures of Kfar Hamam include the village's previous Mokhtar (village mayor) Abdo Ali Abdulhamid, the previous Lebanese Member of Parliament Ahmad Sweid, the Judge Mohamed Sweid, and Dr. Ghazi Chahrour who happened to be one of the first few doctors to find a cure for certain cases of cancer around the world.

=== Israeli occupation (1978-2000) ===
During the Israeli occupation of the region, most village locals were either jailed, killed, or exiled. Abdo Ali Abdulhamid, the mayor of Kfar Hamam from 1950 to 2001 and of Kfar Shouba and Al-Hebbariyah throughout the period of occupation was exiled several times, last of which was in 1994. His last exile was a result of his resistance and effort to dismantle a plan by the Israeli government settle Jewish Falasha people of African descent in settlements in the Hasbaya district. He worked with other local elected officials like Kamel al Assaad and the Lebanese government to prevent this plan from materializing. He was very active and vocal in his refusal to work with the Israelis and their allies. All 10 of his children were banned from entering the village during this period. A lot of the villagers joined the Lebanese Communist Party during the years of occupation and were active in occupation resistance efforts. One of the earliest Lebanese Communist Party members to die in armed struggle for the liberation of South Lebanon was a Kfar Hamam native, Yehya El-Khaled. He was posthumously honored by naming the main street in the village after him. Kfarhamam was the HQ of Norway's no:Norbatts 3rd plt Coy B at UNIFIL during the UNIFIL-mission 1978-1998.

=== Since the year 2000 ===
After the occupation ended in 2000, the community in Kfarhamam underwent a short-lived period of return, growth, and reconstruction. The village was affected by the 2006 Lebanon war. The following period of Hezbollah hegemony over Lebanon and the Syrian Civil War next door has meant continued economic hardship for communities in Kfarhamam and beyond. Most community members currently live in the diaspora, mainly in Kuwait, UAE, Saudi Arabia, France, Canada, Netherlands, and the US

== Geography ==
Kfar Hamam is known for its many different kinds of trees including pine, olives, figs, and grapes. The village's production of these fruits is much higher than its demand. There are small Roman ruins in Kfar Hamam that are part of Temples of Mount Hermon. The village also has three pre-historic caves and tunnels. The security threats associated with the proximity of the region to the borders of Israel and Syria have prevented further excavation in those locations.

There are centennial olive trees in the village.

== Demographics ==
In 2014 Muslims made up 99.66% of registered voters in Kfar Hamam, and in particular 94.80% of the voters were Sunni Muslims.

== Bibliography ==
- Robinson, E.; Smith, E. (1841). Biblical Researches in Palestine, Mount Sinai and Arabia Petraea: A Journal of Travels in the year 1838. Vol. 3. Boston: Crocker & Brewster.

== Sources ==
- ar:كفرحمام
- "Mabrouk et Tahrir" documentary, Dir. Dalia FATHALLAH, Prod. INA - IMAGES PLUS, Info here: https://web.archive.org/web/20071106161101/http://imagesplus.org/pages/0_docu_m.htm
