= Fardis, Lebanon =

Municipality in Hasbaya District, Lebanon

Al-Fardis الفرديس
- Municipality
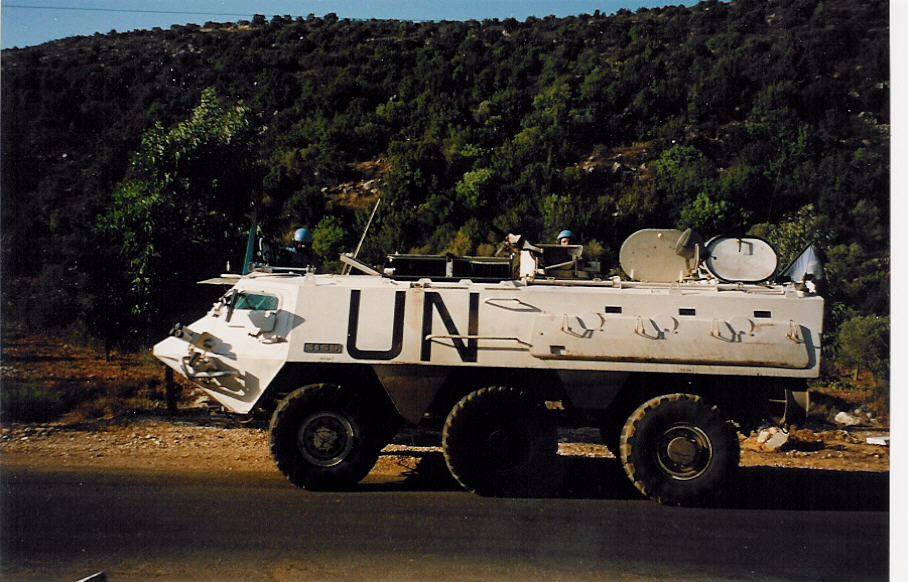
- Sisu XA-180, part of UNIFIL, in Al-Fardis, 1998

- Location within Lebanon
- Coordinates: 33°22′19″N 35°40′04″E
- Grid position: 143/159 L
- Country: Lebanon
- Governorate: Nabatieh Governorate
- District: Hasbaya District
- Time zone: UTC+2 (EET)
  - Summer (DST): UTC+3 (EEST)
- Dialing code: +961

Al-Fardis (Arabic: الفرديس, romanized: al-Fardīs) is a municipality in the Hasbaya District of Lebanon.

== History ==
In 1838, during the Ottoman era, Eli Smith noted that the population of Al-Fardis consisted of Druze and "Greek" Christians.

In 1852 Edward Robinson noted it as a village on the road between Rashaya al-Foukhar and Hasbaya, located directly east of Kaukaba.

In 1875, Victor Guérin noted it as small village, inhabited by "Schismatic Greek" and Druse.

=== Modern era ===
In 1988, when the no:Norbatt part of UNIFIL was stationed there, the village had 500 inhabitants, all Druze.

== Demographics ==
In 2014 Druze made up 90.46% and Christians made up 8.99% of registered voters in Al-Fardis. The Christian population is Greek Orthodox.

== Bibliography ==
- Guérin, V. (1880). Description Géographique Historique et Archéologique de la Palestine (in French). Vol. 3: Galilee, pt. 2. Paris: L'Imprimerie Nationale.
- Robinson, E.; Smith, E. (1841). Biblical Researches in Palestine, Mount Sinai and Arabia Petraea: A Journal of Travels in the year 1838. Vol. 3. Boston: Crocker & Brewster.
- Robinson, E.; Smith, E. (1856). Later Biblical Researches in Palestine and adjacent regions: A Journal of Travels in the year 1852. London: John Murray.
