= Mimess =

Mimess ميمس
- Municipality
- Location within Lebanon
- Coordinates: 33°25′11″N 35°42′51″E
- Country: Lebanon
- Governorate: Nabatieh Governorate
- District: Hasbaya District
- Elevation: 800 m (2,600 ft)
- Time zone: UTC+2 (EET)
  - Summer (DST): UTC+3 (EEST)

Mimess (Arabic: ميمس) is a municipality the Hasbaya District in Lebanon.

== History ==
In 1838, during the Ottoman era, Eli Smith noted the population of Mimis as being Druze and "Greek" Christians.

In 1875 Victor Guérin noted: "At nine hours fifteen minutes, I crossed the Wadi Mimas, which leads to the Wadi et-Teim. Beyond, to the north, rises, on a hill, the village of the same name. It is inhabited by Druses and schismatic Greeks. Some ruins on a mound next to this village, on the west side, are called Kharbet Ras A'ly".

== Demographics ==
In 2014 Druze made up 82.14% and Christians made up 16.25% of registered voters in Mimess. 13.93% of the voters were Greek Orthodox.

== Bibliography ==
- Guérin, V. (1880). Description Géographique Historique et Archéologique de la Palestine (in French). Vol. 3: Galilee, pt. 2. Paris: L'Imprimerie Nationale.
- Robinson, E.; Smith, E. (1841). Biblical Researches in Palestine, Mount Sinai and Arabia Petraea: A Journal of Travels in the year 1838. Vol. 3. Boston: Crocker & Brewster.
