= Hasbaya District =

Coordinates: 33.3985°N 35.6829°E

- District
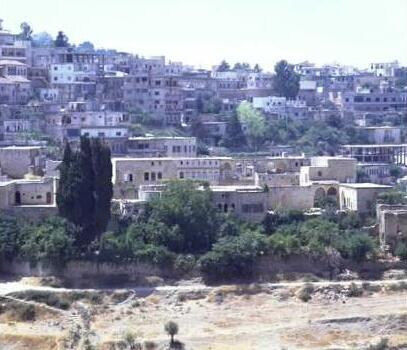
- Hasbaya District

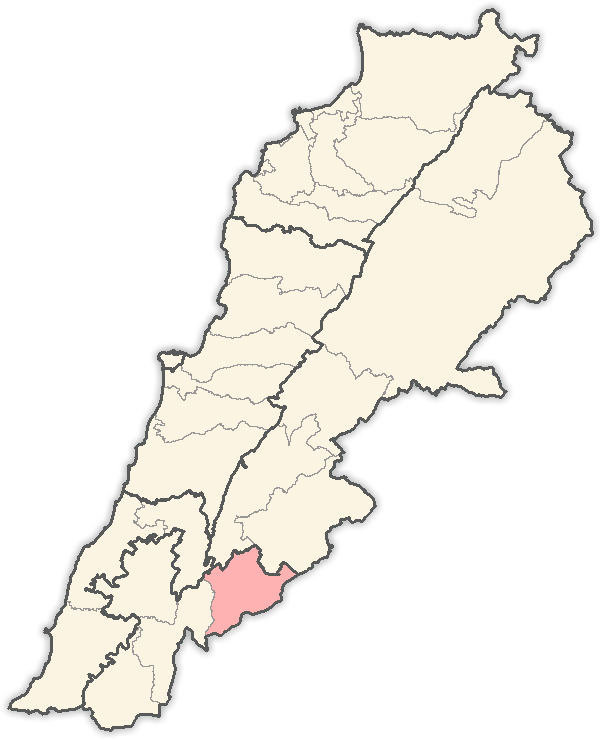
- Location in Lebanon
- Country: Lebanon
- Governorate: Nabatiyeh Governorate
- Capital: Hasbaya

Area
  - Total: 102 sq mi (265 km^{2})

Population
  - Estimate (31 December 2017): 37,784
- Time zone: UTC+2 (EET)
  - Summer (DST): UTC+3 (EEST)

The Hasbaya District is one of the four districts in the Nabatiyeh Governorate of Lebanon. It lies in the southeast, bordering Syria to the east and Israel to the south. The capital of the district is Hasbaya, a town with a population that is mostly Druze oriented and some Christians.

== Municipalities ==
The following 20 municipalities are all located in the Hasbaya District:

- Abu Qamha
- Ain Jarfa
- Ain Qenia
- Al-Dalafa
- Al-Majidiyah
- Al-Mari
- Berghoz
- Shouaya
- Al-Fardis
- Hasbaya
- Al-Hebbariyah
- Kaukaba
- Kfar Shouba
- Kfar Hamam
- Al-Kfeir
- Al-Khalouat
- Marj al-Zuhour
- Mimess
- Rashaya al-Foukhar
- Shebaa

== Gallery ==
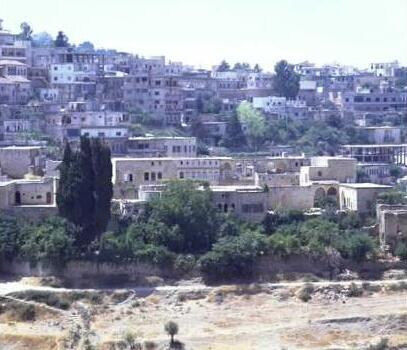

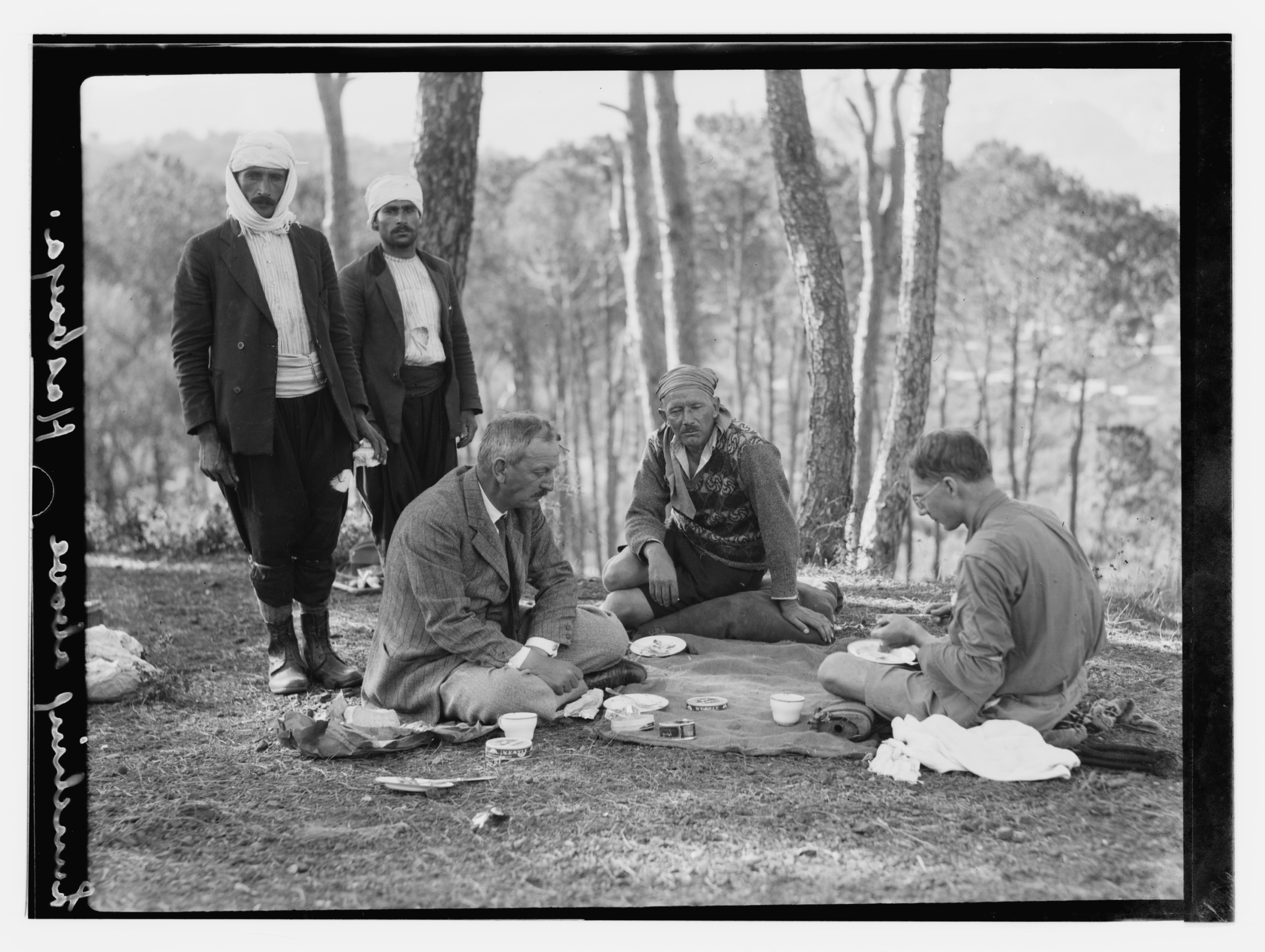

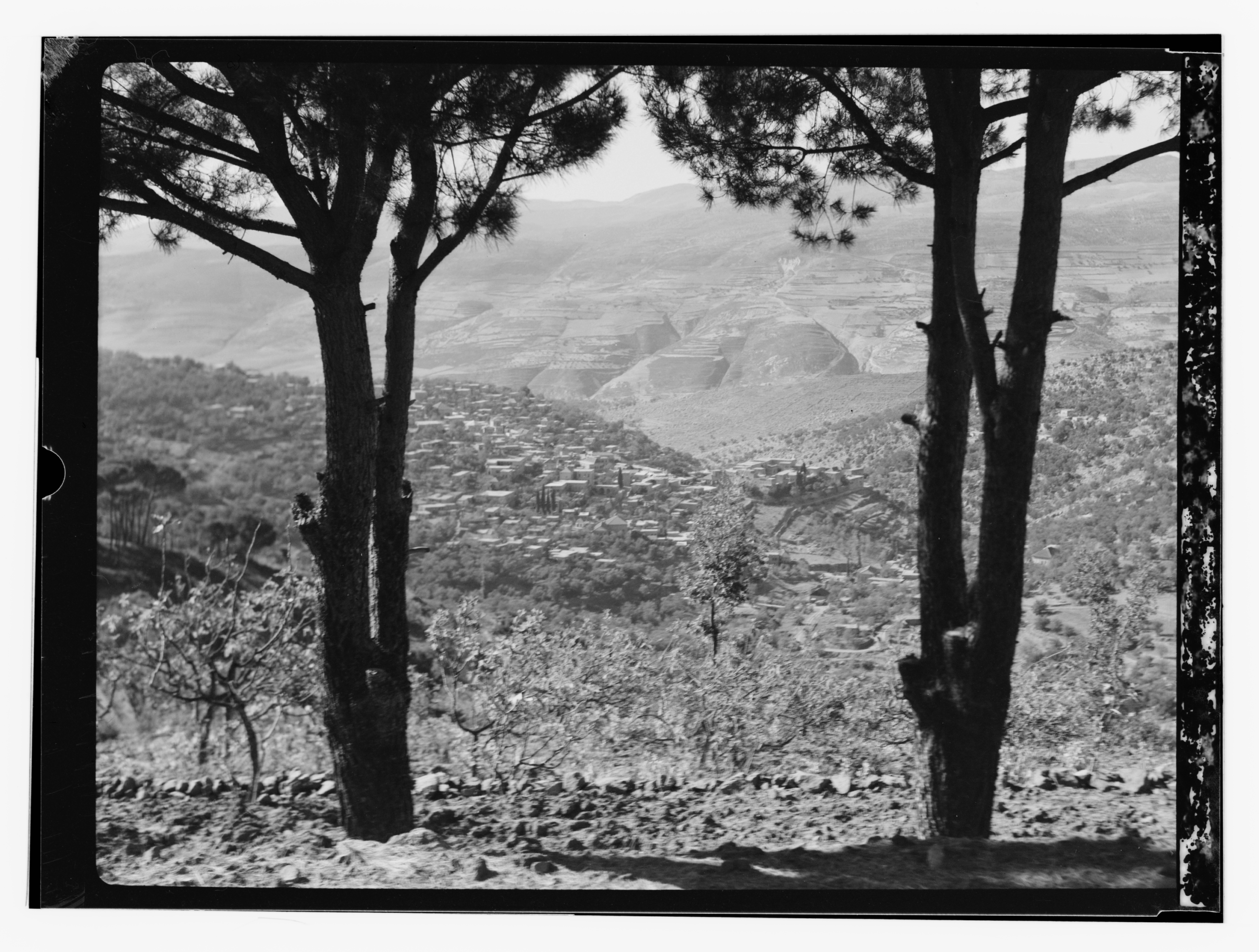

== Demographics ==
According to registered voters in 2014:

Year	Christians					Muslims				Druze in Lebanon
Year	Total	Greek Orthodox	Maronites	Greek Catholics	Other Christians	Total	Sunnis	Shias	Alawites	Druze
2014	15.86%	8.29%	4.28%	2.30%	0.99%	51.58%	48.75%	2.83%	0.00%	32.17%
2022	22.15%	9.39%	8.63%	3.61%	0.52%	48.70%	46.80%	1.90%	0.00%	29.15%
