= Ain Jarfa =

Ain Jarfa عين جرفا
- Municipality
- Location within Lebanon
- Coordinates: 33°23′02″N 35°41′08″E
- Country: Lebanon
- Governorate: Nabatieh Governorate
- District: Hasbaya District
- Time zone: UTC+2 (EET)
  - Summer (DST): UTC+3 (EEST)

Ain Jarfa (Arabic: عين جرفا, romanized: ʿAyn Jarfā) is a municipality in the Hasbaya District in Lebanon.

== History ==
In 1838, Eli Smith noted it as a village called 'Ain Jurfa located in "on the east side" of "the lower side of Wade et-Teim". The inhabitants were Druse.

In 1875, Victor Guérin visited A'in Djerfa, which he described was: "Inhabited by Druzes, numbering approximately 200, it [the village] succeeded another older one, as evidenced by several ancient cisterns and the regularity of the materials with which at least half of the houses were built, in whole or in part, as well as the public fountain.

== Demographics ==
In 2014, Druze made up 100% of registered voters in Ain Jarfa.

== Bibliography ==
- Guérin, V. (1880). Description Géographique Historique et Archéologique de la Palestine (in French). Vol. 3: Galilee, pt. 2. Paris: L'Imprimerie Nationale.
- Robinson, E.; Smith, E. (1841). Biblical Researches in Palestine, Mount Sinai and Arabia Petraea: A Journal of Travels in the year 1838. Vol. 3. Boston: Crocker & Brewster.
