= Kaukaba =

Kaukaba كوكبا Kawkaba
- Municipality
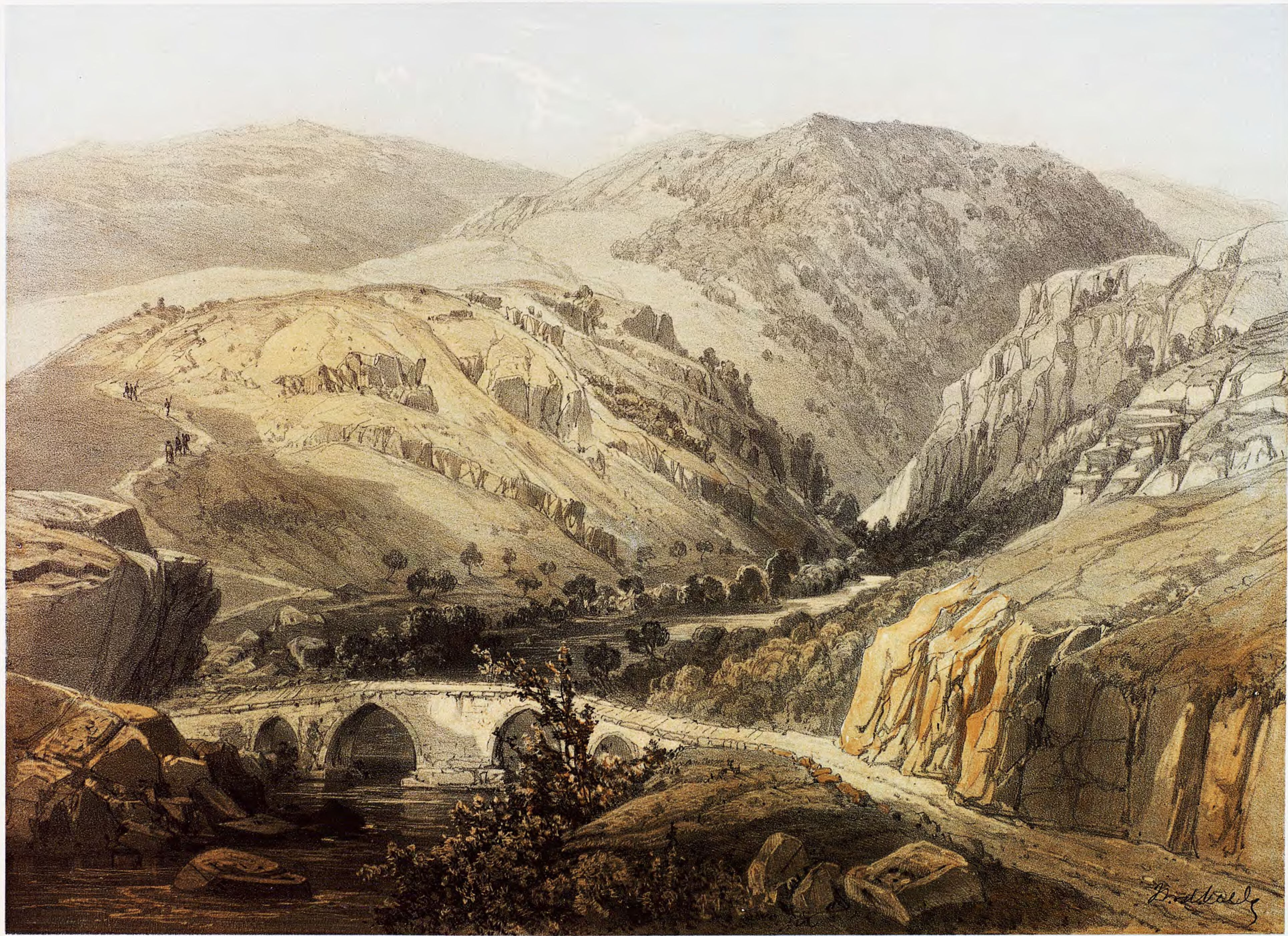
- The bridge over Litani River by Kaukaba, by van de Velde, in 1851

- Location within Lebanon
- Coordinates: 33°23′44″N 35°38′18″E
- Grid position: 140/162 L
- Country: Lebanon
- Governorate: Nabatieh Governorate
- District: Hasbaya District
- Time zone: UTC+2 (EET)
  - Summer (DST): UTC+3 (EEST)
- Dialing code: +961

Kaukaba
- كوكبا (Arabic)
- Interactive map of Kaukaba
- Type: Rock Shelter
- Periods: PPNB, Neolithic
- Location: 5 miles from Rashaya, Lebanon
- Part of: Settlement

History
- Built: c. 8200-6200 BC

Site notes
- Material: Limestone
- Excavation dates: 1957, 1964
- Archaeologists: P. Billaux, F. Skeels, L. Skeels
- Condition: ruins
- Public access: Yes

Kaukaba (Arabic: كوكبا, romanized: Kawkabā) or Kawkaba is a municipality in the Hasbaya District in the Nabatieh Governorate in southern Lebanon.

== Archaeology ==
By the village is a Neolithic archaeological site East of Majdel Balhis near Rashaya in the Beqaa Valley, Lebanon. It was first found by P. Billaux in 1957 who alerted Jesuit Archaeologists, Fathers Henri Fleisch and Tallon. Open air site excavations by L. and F. Skeels were also carried out in 1964.

The rock shelter site lies amongst fields covered with basalt boulders from ancient lava flows. It is in a low pass from the Karaoun Dam to Rashaya. This area is close to the 4 heads of the Jordan River and is drained by feeders such as the Dan, Banias, Hasbani and Upper Jordan rivers, North of Hasbaya.

Artefacts found on the surface included flint axes, sickles, obsidian, basalt vessels and arrowheads dated to the oldest Neolithic periods. Prominent artefacts found included a series of flint picks with heavily worn points due to extremely heavy usage. Fragments of agricultural tools such as basalt hoes have been found with very slight dating suggesting the 6th millennium or earlier. Flints were not knapped on site and the centre of the hoe production has not yet been found.

== History ==
In 1838, during the Ottoman era, Eli Smith noted the population of Kaukaba as Maronite and Druze, while in 1875, Victor Guérin found the population to mostly be Maronite.

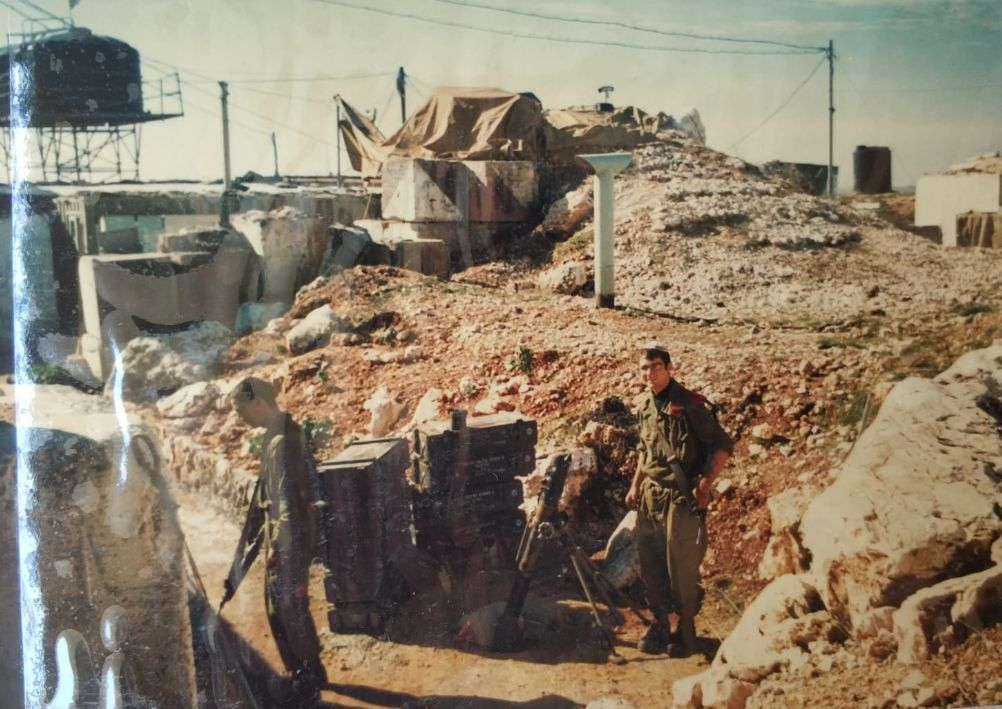
Israeli military base of Kaukaba, during the occupation of Southern Lebanon

== Demographics ==
In 2014 Christians made up 98.54% of registered voters in Kaukaba. 88.13% of the voters were Maronite Catholics.

== See also ==
- Battle of Kaukaba
- Emily Nasrallah

== Bibliography ==
- Guérin, V. (1880). Description Géographique Historique et Archéologique de la Palestine (in French). Vol. 3: Galilee, pt. 2. Paris: L'Imprimerie Nationale.
- Robinson, E.; Smith, E. (1841). Biblical Researches in Palestine, Mount Sinai and Arabia Petraea: A Journal of Travels in the year 1838. Vol. 3. Boston: Crocker & Brewster.
