= Al-Khalouat =

Al-Khalouat الخلوات
- Municipality
- Location within Lebanon
- Coordinates: 33°24′58″N 35°44′19″E
- Country: Lebanon
- Governorate: Nabatieh Governorate
- District: Hasbaya District
- Elevation: 950 m (3,120 ft)
- Time zone: UTC+2 (EET)
  - Summer (DST): UTC+3 (EEST)

Al-Khalouat alt. Khalwat (Arabic: الخلوات, romanized: al-Khalwāt) is a municipality the Hasbaya District in Lebanon.

== History ==
In 1838, during the Ottoman era, Eli Smith noted the population of el-Khulwat as being Druze.

== Demographics ==
In 2014 Druze made up 99.69% of registered voters in Al-Khalouat.

== Bibliography ==
- Robinson, E.; Smith, E. (1841). Biblical Researches in Palestine, Mount Sinai and Arabia Petraea: A Journal of Travels in the year 1838. Vol. 3. Boston: Crocker & Brewster.
