= Abu Qamha =

Abu Qamha ابو قمحة
- Municipality
- Location within Lebanon
- Coordinates: 33°22′55.65648″N 35°39′44.57452″E
- Country: Lebanon
- Governorate: Nabatieh Governorate
- District: Hasbaya District
- Time zone: UTC+2 (EET)
  - Summer (DST): UTC+3 (EEST)

Abu Qamha (Arabic: ابو قمحة, romanized: Ābū Qamḥah) is a municipality in the Hasbaya District in Lebanon.

== Demographics ==
In 2014, Christians made up 99.51% of registered voters in Abu Qamha. 76.59% of the voters were Greek Orthodox and 16.59% were Maronite Catholics.
