= Shouaya =

Shouaya شويّا
- Municipality
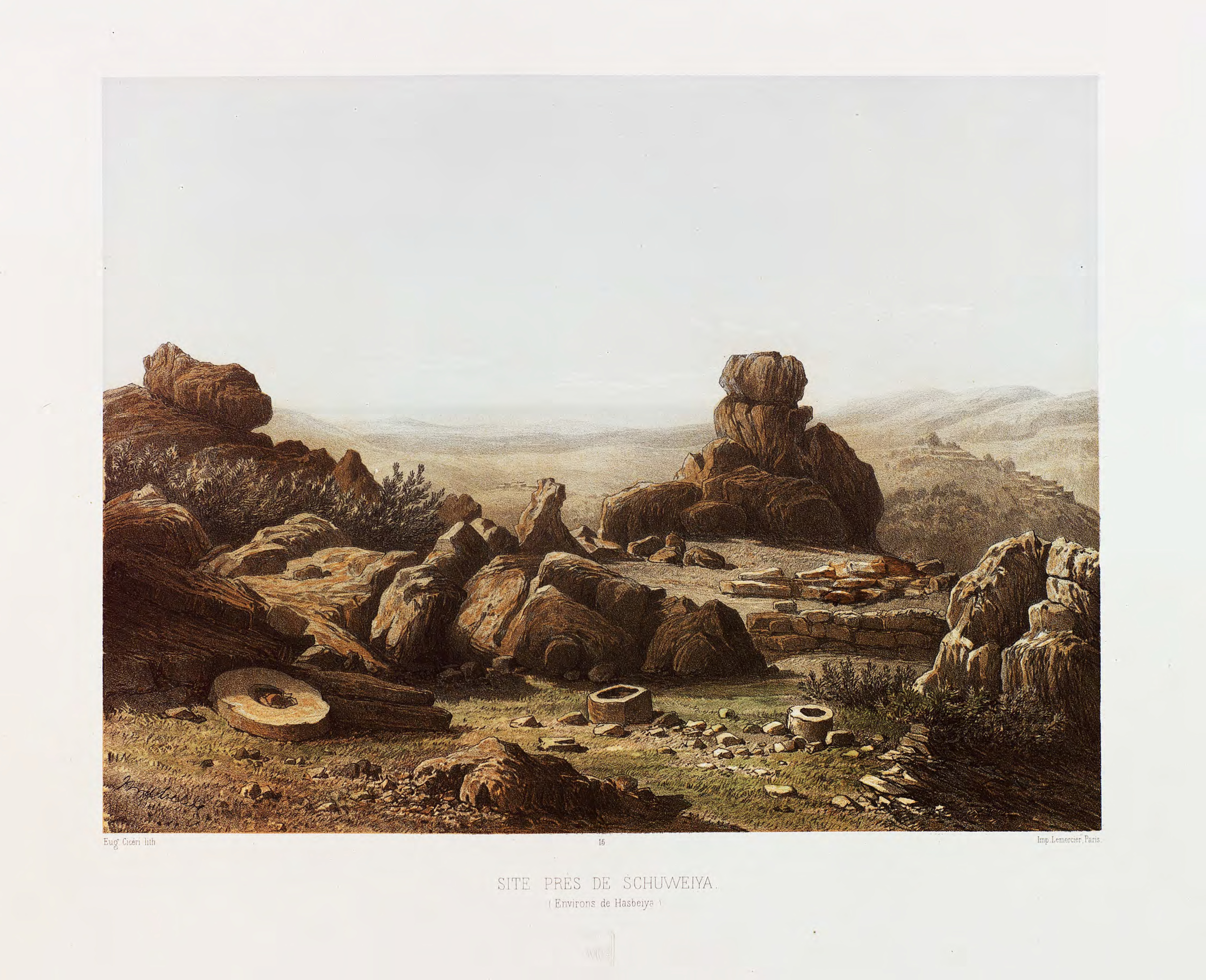
- Ruins close to "Schuweiya" in the early 1850s, by van de Velde

- Location within Lebanon
- Coordinates: 33°23′34″N 35°42′59″E
- Country: Lebanon
- Governorate: Nabatieh Governorate
- District: Hasbaya District
- Elevation: 1,070 m (3,510 ft)
- Time zone: UTC+2 (EET)
  - Summer (DST): UTC+3 (EEST)

Shouaya (Arabic: شويّا, romanized: Shuwayyā) is a municipality in the Hasbaya District in Lebanon.

== History ==
In 1838, during the Ottoman era, Eli Smith noted the population of Shuweiya as being Druze and "Greek" Christians.

In 1875 Victor Guérin described it: "Continuing up, I arrive, at six hours forty minutes, at Choueia, another village whose population is similarly composed of Druses and schismatic Greeks. To the east of this village and the plantations of fig trees, vineyards and mulberry trees that surround it, I notice old quarries, which were later transformed into reservoirs, and a little further the remains of a tower antique measuring 12 steps long by 8 wide and built with very considerable blocks, regularly cut. At a short distance from there, several funerary pits dug in the rock are perhaps contemporaneous with this tower, which was intended to protect the road leading on this side to the top of the Great Hermon"

=== Modern era ===
After the 1982 invasion Shouaya became part of Israeli Security Zone. On 8 June 1990 a clash occurred in the area in which four members of the Popular Front for the Liberation of Palestine (PFLP) were killed by the South Lebanon Army (SLA).

== Demographics ==
In 2014 Druze made up 97.13% of registered voters in Shouaya.

== Bibliography ==
- Guérin, V. (1880). Description Géographique Historique et Archéologique de la Palestine (in French). Vol. 3: Galilee, pt. 2. Paris: L'Imprimerie Nationale.
- Robinson, E.; Smith, E. (1841). Biblical Researches in Palestine, Mount Sinai and Arabia Petraea: A Journal of Travels in the year 1838. Vol. 3. Boston: Crocker & Brewster.
