= Battle of Kaukaba =

1978 battle of the Lebanese Civil War

- Part of Lebanese Civil War
Date	9 May 1978
Location	Kaukaba, Southern Lebanon
Result	Norwegian victory

Belligerents
Norway	PLO

Casualties and losses
1 wounded	1 dead, 1 wounded (Palestinian sources); 8 dead (Norwegian sources)

Battle of Kaukaba was a skirmish that took place on May 9, 1978 when PLO soldiers attacked Norwegian peacekeepers. The battle took place about six weeks after the first Norwegian troops arrived (first arrival was March 25) in Lebanon. The Norwegian military released the sound recordings from the battle in 2008.

The skirmish is regarded as one of the hardest battles fought by Norwegian soldiers in the UNIFIL force, and the PLO soldiers got as close as 30 meters. Throughout the skirmish, the Norwegians fired about 200 machine gun shots, 50 shots from automatic weapons and two Carl Gustav RFK grenades. The PLO fired about ten times more shots from hand weapons, as well as eight gun grenades. Eventually the PLO gave up, and pledged not to fire at the Norwegians again. One Norwegian suffered light injuries during the attack. Official PLO casualties were one dead and one wounded. The Norwegian soldiers believed the real number of Palestinians dead to be closer to eight.
