= Ain Qenia =

Municipality in Nabatieh Governorate, Lebanon

Ain Qenia عين قنيا
- Municipality
- Location within Lebanon
- Coordinates: 33°23′54″N 35°42′22″E
- Country: Lebanon
- Governorate: Nabatieh Governorate
- District: Hasbaya District
- Elevation: 960 m (3,150 ft)
- Time zone: UTC+2 (EET)
  - Summer (DST): UTC+3 (EEST)

Ain Qenia (Levantine Arabic: عين قنيا, romanized: ʿAyn Qeniyā) is a municipality in the Hasbaya District in Lebanon.

== History ==
In 1838, during the Ottoman era, Eli Smith noted the population of the place (which he called 'Ain Tinta), as being Druze.

In 1875 Victor Guérin noted about A'in Kenia: "On October 12, at six o'clock in the morning, I cross the Wadi Hasbeya, which crosses from east to west the village of this name, and I climb to the east-northeast, then to the east, well-cultivated slopes, where the vine prospers wonderfully at a height that exceeds 8oo meters above the Mediterranean. At six hours and thirty minutes, I reach A'in Kenia, a village inhabited by Druses and schismatic Greeks. We observe the debris of an ancient tower of defense in gigantic blocks. An excellent spring flows in this place, and it is it which, by means of a conduit, feeds water to the castle of Hasbeya."

== Demographics ==
In 2014 Druze made up 91.73% and Christians made up 7.43% of registered voters in Ain Qenia. The Christian population is mostly Greek Orthodox.

== Bibliography ==
- Guérin, V. (1880). Description Géographique Historique et Archéologique de la Palestine (in French). Vol. 3: Galilee, pt. 2. Paris: L'Imprimerie Nationale.
- Robinson, E.; Smith, E. (1841). Biblical Researches in Palestine, Mount Sinai and Arabia Petraea: A Journal of Travels in the year 1838. Vol. 3. Boston: Crocker & Brewster.
