= Al-Hebbariyah =

Al-Hebbariyah الهبّارية Hebbariya, Hibbariyeh, Hebbariyeh, Hebariye
- Municipality
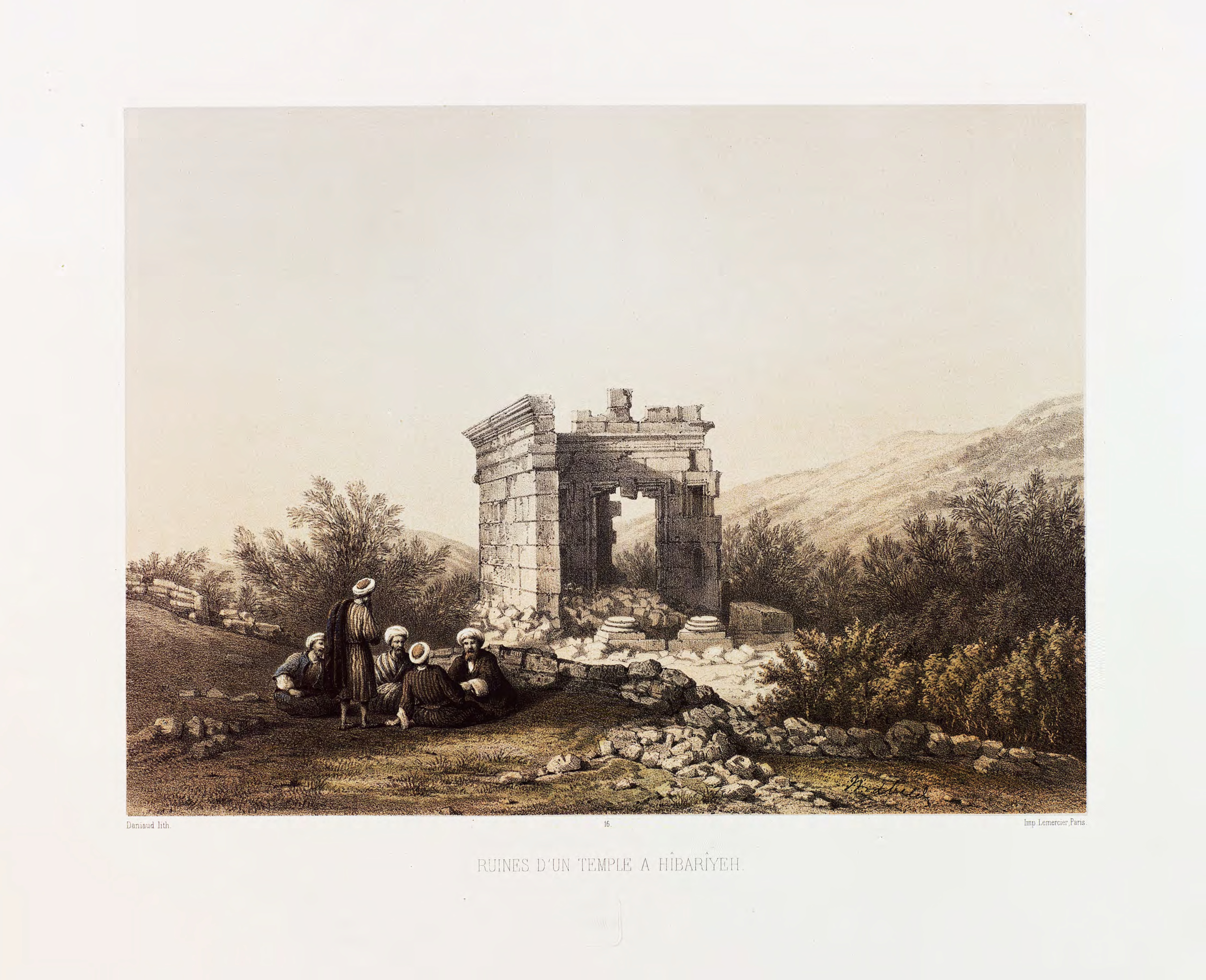
- Roman Temple, Al-Hebbariyah, ca 1851, by van de Velde
- Interactive map of Al-Hebbariyah
- Country: Lebanon
- Governorate: Nabatieh Governorate
- District: Hasbaya District

Population (1970)
  - Total: 1,800

Al-Hebbariyah
- Habbariya, Habbariyeh, Habariya
- Location within Lebanon
- 33.3675°N 35.694167°E
- Cultures: Roman
- Location: 116 kilometres (72 mi) east of Beirut
- Region: Hasbaya

Site notes
- Condition: Ruins
- Public access: Yes

Al-Hebbariyah, Hebbariyeh, Hebbariya or Hebariya (Levantine Arabic: الهبّارية, romanized: al-Hebbāriyeh) is a municipality situated in the Hasbaya District of the Nabatieh Governorate in Lebanon. It is located on the southwestern slopes of Mount Hermon near the Lebanon–Syria border, northeast of Rachaya Al Foukhar and is positioned amongst orchards of apricot trees. There it is a roman temple.

The village sits c. 750 metres (2,460 ft) above sea level and the small population is predominantly support the Lebanese Communist party

== Roman temple ==
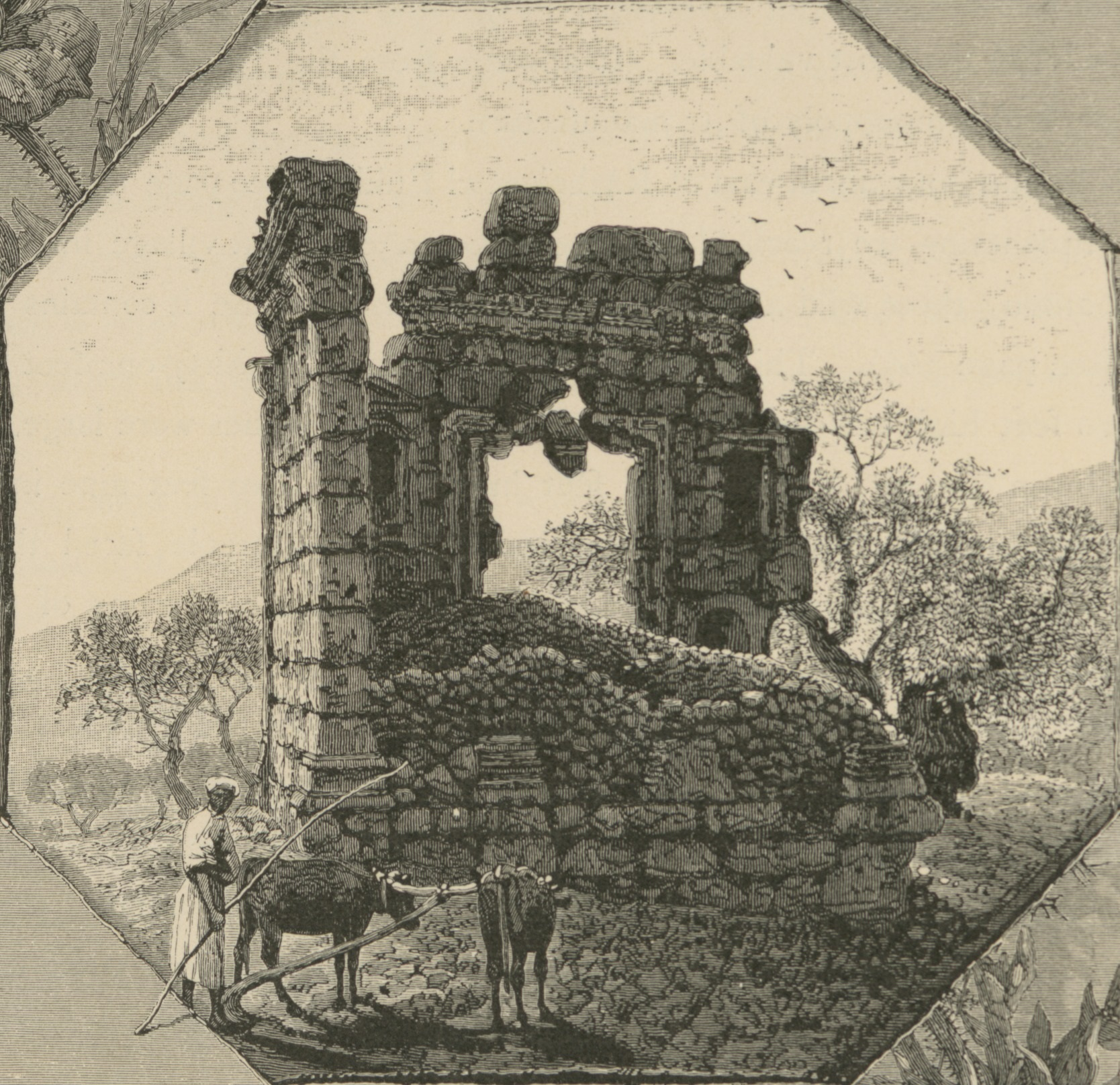
Al-Hebbariyah, in the 1880s

There is a Roman temple near to the village, opposite the Wadi Shib'a which is the most southern of the Temples of Mount Hermon, a group defined by George Taylor as being south of the main road to Damascus on the west of Mount Hermon, including the Wadi al-Taym area. It has been classified as an Antae temple with an eastern portal that faces Mount Hermon, aligned "as if to catch the first beams of the morning sun rising over Hermon." The temple has a large basement chamber underneath the cella floors that is thought to have been used for burial. The room is only accessible from the outside of the building. The temple was surveyed in the summer of 1852 by Edward Robinson who noted several large blocks with one measuring 2.75 feet (0.84 m) by 15 feet (4.6 m). He measured the dimensions of the temple to be 58 feet (18 m) long by 31 feet (9.4 m) wide with 6 feet (1.8 m) thick walls around 32 feet (9.8 m) high. The capitals appeared to be of an Ionic style. At the entrance doorway, there are two tiers of niches with some engraved writing beneath the upper set.

During the 2024 Israeli invasion of Lebanon, UNESCO gave enhanced protection to 34 cultural sites including the temple at Al-Hebbariyah to safeguard it from damage.

== Demographics ==
In 2014 Muslims made up 99.13% of registered voters in Al-Hebbariyah. 95.75% of the voters were Sunni Muslims.

== Bibliography ==
- Guérin, V. (1880). Description Géographique Historique et Archéologique de la Palestine (in French). Vol. 3: Galilee, pt. 2. Paris: L'Imprimerie Nationale. (pp.285-286)
- Robinson, E.; Smith, E. (1856). Later Biblical Researches in Palestine and adjacent regions: A Journal of Travels in the year 1852. London: John Murray.
- Wilson, C. W., ed. (c. 1881). Picturesque Palestine, Sinai and Egypt. Vol. 2. New York: D. Appleton.
- Warren, C.; Conder, C.R. (1884). The Survey of Western Palestine: Jerusalem. London: Committee of the Palestine Exploration Fund. (pp. 493-496)
