= Shebaa =

Municipality in Nabatieh Governorate, Lebanon

Shebaa شبعا
- Municipality
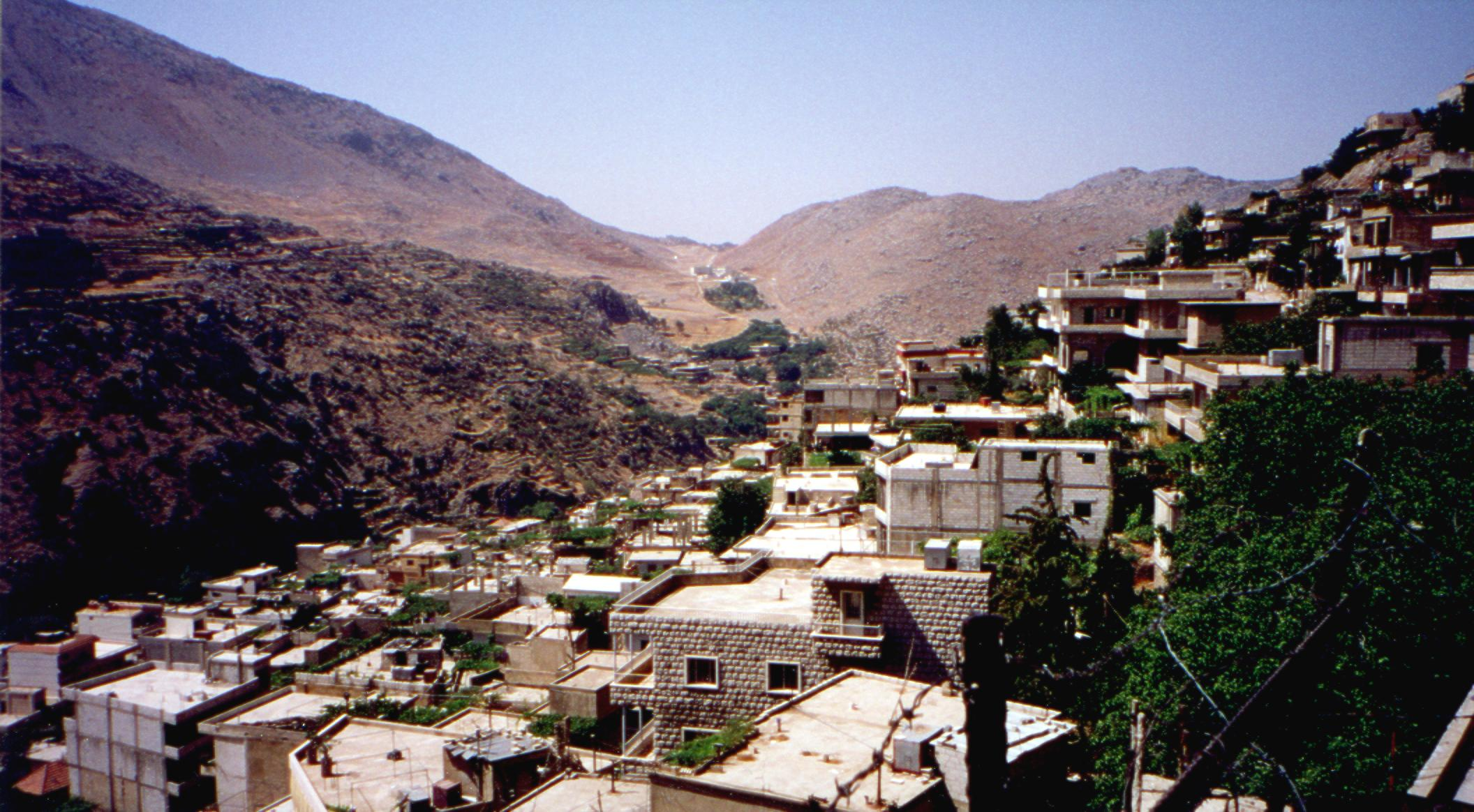
- Shebaa in 1998

- Location within Lebanon
- Coordinates: 33°20′55″N 35°44′55″E
- Country: Lebanon
- Governorate: Nabatieh Governorate
- District: Hasbaya District
- Time zone: UTC+2 (EET)
  - Summer (DST): UTC+3 (EEST)
- Dialing code: +961

Shebaa (Arabic: شبعا, romanized: Shibʿā) is a municipality on the south-eastern tip of Lebanon. It has a largely Sunni Muslim population of 25,000 people. It is situated at an altitude of approximately 1,700 m (5,600 ft) above sea level, spreading across two steep rocky mountainsides. It lies adjacent to the Lebanese claimed but Israeli occupied Shebaa farms—which sit between the town and the Golan Heights. Before 1967, residents of Shebaa farmed in the disputed Shebaa farms territory.

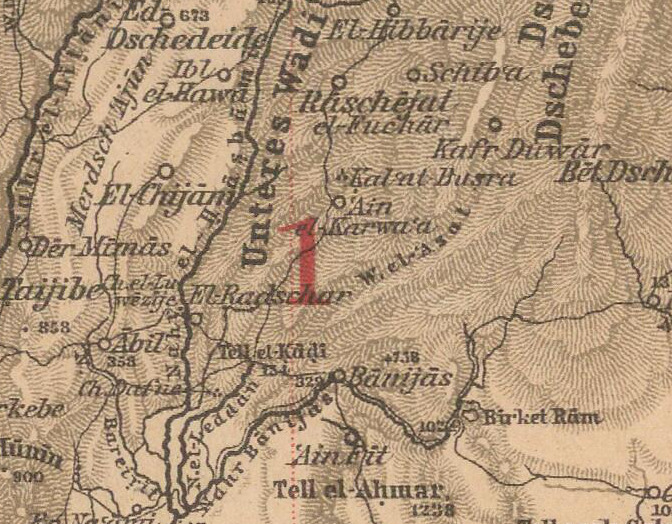
Shebaa shown in an early 20th-century German map

== History ==
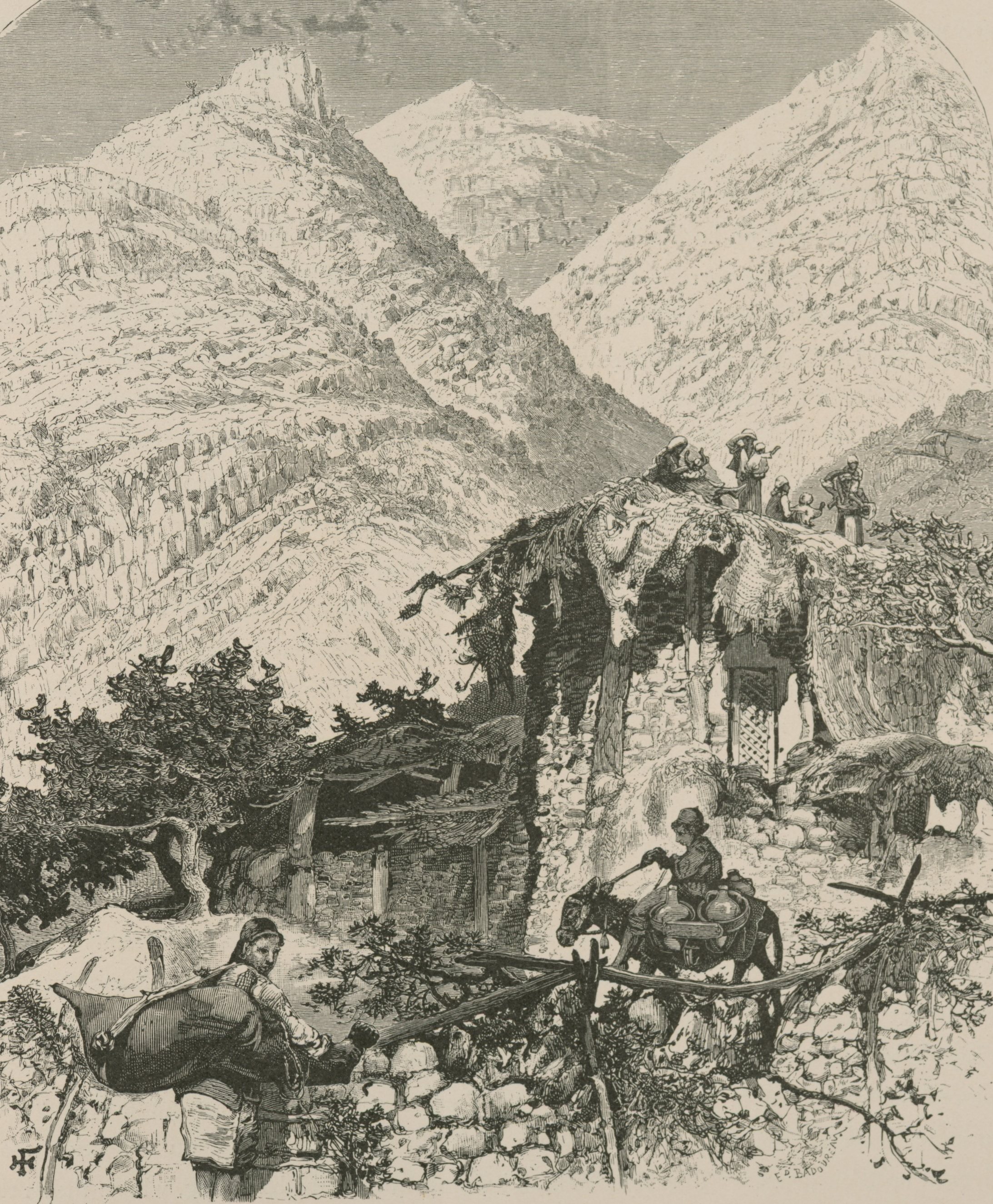
Chebaa, in the 1880s

In 1838, Eli Smith noted Shebaa's population as being Sunni Muslim and Greek Orthodox Christians.

Following the 1982 Lebanon War, Shebaa became part of Israel’s security zone with Norwegian soldiers from UNIFIL stationed in the area. On one night in late January 1989, the Israeli backed SLA expelled 40 villagers, ordering them not to return. This brought the total over a period of several months to around 80. In the words of the UNIFIL spokesperson those expelled were “mostly women and children”. Israel withdrew from South Lebanon, including the town of Shebaa, in 2000.

As of 2025, the town housed 4,500 Syrian refugees.

== Demographics ==
In 2014, Muslims made up 96.96% and Christians made up 2.89% of registered voters in Shebaa. 92.99% of the voters were Sunni Muslims. The Christian population is mostly Greek Orthodox.

== Educational establishments ==
Educational establishments	Chebaa (Hasbaiya) (2005–2006)	Lebanon (2005–2006)
Number of schools	4	2788
Public schools	2	1763
Private schools	2	1025
Students in public schools	435	439905
Students in private schools	145	471409

== Bibliography ==
- Robinson, E.; Smith, E. (1841). Biblical Researches in Palestine, Mount Sinai and Arabia Petraea: A Journal of Travels in the year 1838. Vol. 3. Boston: Crocker & Brewster.
- Wilson, C.W., ed. (c. 1881). Picturesque Palestine, Sinai and Egypt. Vol. 2. New York: D. Appleton.
