= Majdel Balhis =

Majdel Balhis مجدل بلهيص
- Village
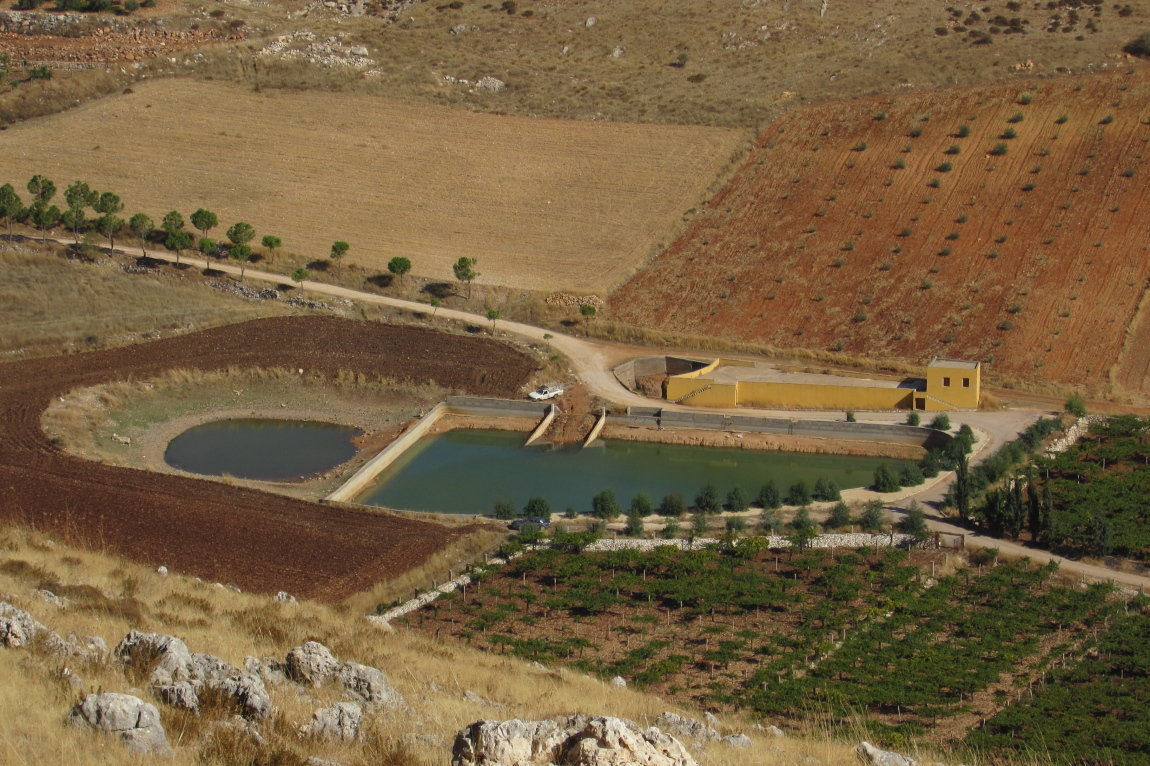

- Location in Lebanon
- Coordinates: 33°32′17″N 35°44′42″E
- Country: Lebanon
- Governorate: Beqaa Governorate
- District: Rachaiya District
- Elevation: 3,600 ft (1,100 m)

Population (2019)
  - Total: 800

Majdel Balhis (Arabic: مجدل بلهيص, romanized: Majdal Bālhīṣ) is a village and municipality located in Rashaya District, Beqaa Governorate, Lebanon. Majdel Balhis is 95 km away from Beirut. Its altitude is 1100 meters above sea level. The area of Majdel Balhis covers 2004 hectares. Majdel Balhis is located on the western slopes of Mount Hermon.

Majdel Balhis has a large expatriate community in Ottawa in Canada, and the first mosque in that city was founded by a group people from Mejdal Balhis.

In 1838, Eli Smith noted Mejdel Belhis as a village in the Beqaa Valley.

== History ==
=== Antiquity and Etymology ===
The name Majdel Balhis is derived from the Syriac Magdelo, signifying a "tower" or "fortress." The village's strategic location overlooking the Bekaa Valley made it a significant lookout point during the Roman period. Archaeological remains in the vicinity include rock-cut tombs and limestone sarcophagi, which are characteristic of the ancient settlements in the Rashaya District.

=== Modern History ===
In the early 20th century, the village was impacted by the regional upheavals of the French Mandate. During the Great Syrian Revolt (1925–1927), Majdel Balhis was positioned within the corridor of operations between French forces and Druze insurgents, resulting in localized military engagements and damage to agricultural infrastructure.

During the mid-20th century, the village's demographics and security situation shifted significantly:

- September 22, 1970: In the aftermath of the "Black September" conflict in Jordan and the subsequent relocation of Palestinian fighters to Lebanon, five local residents were summarily executed by Fatah units. The victims were accused of cooperating with the Lebanese Gendarmerie during the consolidation of Palestinian paramilitary control in the "Fatah land" sectors of the Western Bekaa.
- March 1976: During the "Spring Offensive" of the Lebanese Civil War, the village was occupied by joint forces of the Lebanese National Movement and the Palestine Liberation Organization. This period was marked by the large-scale displacement of the village's Maronite and Melkite populations, who sought refuge in the Zahle District and East Beirut.

Following the Taif Agreement and the conclusion of the Lebanese Civil War, Majdel Balhis underwent a period of gradual reconstruction. Administratively, it is a municipality within the Rashaya District, governed by a local municipal council.

Due to its strategic position during the 1975–1990 conflict and the 1982 invasion, the village outskirts were heavily contaminated with unexploded ordnance. Between 2018 and 2022, the Mines Advisory Group (MAG) conducted successful demining operations in the village, returning several hectares of agricultural land to the local community.

== Demographics ==
Historically, Majdel Balhis was a multi-confessional community consisting of Sunni Muslims and Christians (Maronite and Melkite). The demographic composition was significantly altered during the Lebanese Civil War following the occupation of the village in March 1976, which led to the large-scale displacement of the Christian population.

In the post-war era, the village has maintained a modest permanent population, estimated at approximately 800 residents as of 2019, though this figure experiences significant seasonal growth during the summer months. Despite the displacement of the 1970s, a segment of the Christian population maintains property ownership in the village, contributing to a "summer residency" model common in the Beqaa Governorate.

The village is also notable for its extensive diaspora, particularly in Ottawa, Canada. Emigrants from Majdel Balhis were foundational to the establishment of some of the earliest Lebanese-Canadian social and religious networks in the Canadian capital, including the formation of the Majdel Balhis Social Club.

== Bibliography ==
- Robinson, E.; Smith, E. (1841). Biblical Researches in Palestine, Mount Sinai and Arabia Petraea: A Journal of Travels in the year 1838. Vol. 3. Boston: Crocker & Brewster.
