= Kfar Shouba =

Kfar Shouba كفرشوبا
- Municipality
- Location within Lebanon
- Coordinates: 33°19′41″N 35°41′33″E
- Country: Lebanon
- Governorate: Nabatieh Governorate
- District: Hasbaya District

Area
  - Total: 37 km^{2} (14 sq mi)
- (including its hills)
- Elevation: 1,256 m (4,121 ft)

Population
  - Total: 1,000 (another 8,500 people from the village are living abroad)
  - Density: 27/km^{2} (70/sq mi)
- Time zone: UTC+2 (EET)
  - Summer (DST): UTC+3 (EEST)
- Dialing code: +961

Kfar Shouba (Arabic: كفرشوبا, romanized: Kfarshūbā), also known as Kfarshouba and Kafr Shuba, is a municipality in the Hasbaya District of the Nabatieh Governorate in Southern Lebanon. The people of the village are Sunni Muslims. It is situated in the region of Arkoub, at 1256 m above sea level and 130 km from Beirut. Located near the border of Israel and the Golan Heights, not far from the Shebaa Farms, it overlooks in depth both Israel and the Lebanese Bekaa, which makes it a strategic military location.

== History ==
The village was occupied by Israeli troops during a punitive mission, in the wake of PLO attacks inside Israel, on the 26 of February 1972, and was devastated by a major Israeli attack conducted in January 1975. It was bombed and rocketed by Israeli warcraft further on 15 June, and shelled again by Israeli artillery on 31 August, of that year. The mosque in the village was destroyed by Israeli artillery in 1972 but partially rebuilt.

It was struck by Israeli air raids and artillery fire in April 2002 after Hezbollah fired rockets at Israeli army positions in the occupied Shebaa Farms.

In retaliation for a Hezbollah retaliatory strike against an Israeli patrol on the 28 January 2015, the village was shelled by IDF artillery fire, together with the two other border villages of Majidiyeh, Abbasiyeh.

Kfar Shouba is the second largest village in southern Lebanon, which also contains the largest number of young graduates in the Caza of Hasbaya.

The Lebanese Army, as well as Hezbollah, say that Israel is still occupying the general area in which the village is located, known as the Kfarshouba Hills. It stands in mountainous terrain.

As a result of Hezbollah's support for Palestinians during the Gaza war, Israel has struck multiple homes, buildings and cultivated land in the area, which caused great damage to the village and has led to the death of multiple civilians.

== Landmarks ==
- The Shkif (in Arabic الشقيف)
- Ajami, and Mobaraki Sheikh Salam: Considered to be The three major holy chains.

== Demographics ==
In 2014 Muslims made up 98.15% of registered voters in Kfar Shouba. 94.34% of the voters were Sunni Muslims.

=== Large families and notables ===
- Largest families: Al-Kadri (القادري), Kassab (قصب), Abdallah (عبدالله), Diab (ذياب), Ghanem (غانم), Chibli (شبلي), Saleh (صالح), Khebbaiz (خبيز)
- President of the municipal council: Dr Kassem El Kadiri
- Mayors: Mohammad Kassab (Abu Naser), Mohamad Hamed, Ali Salah Diab
- Director of Secondary school: Mohamad El Kadiri
- Director of primary school: Ahmad Toufic Kassab

== Agriculture ==
Kfar Shouba farms produce olives (over 100 tonnes in 2006 including olive oil), figs, grapes, and cherries.
