= Rashaya al-Foukhar =

Rashaya al-Foukhar راشيا الفخار
- Municipality
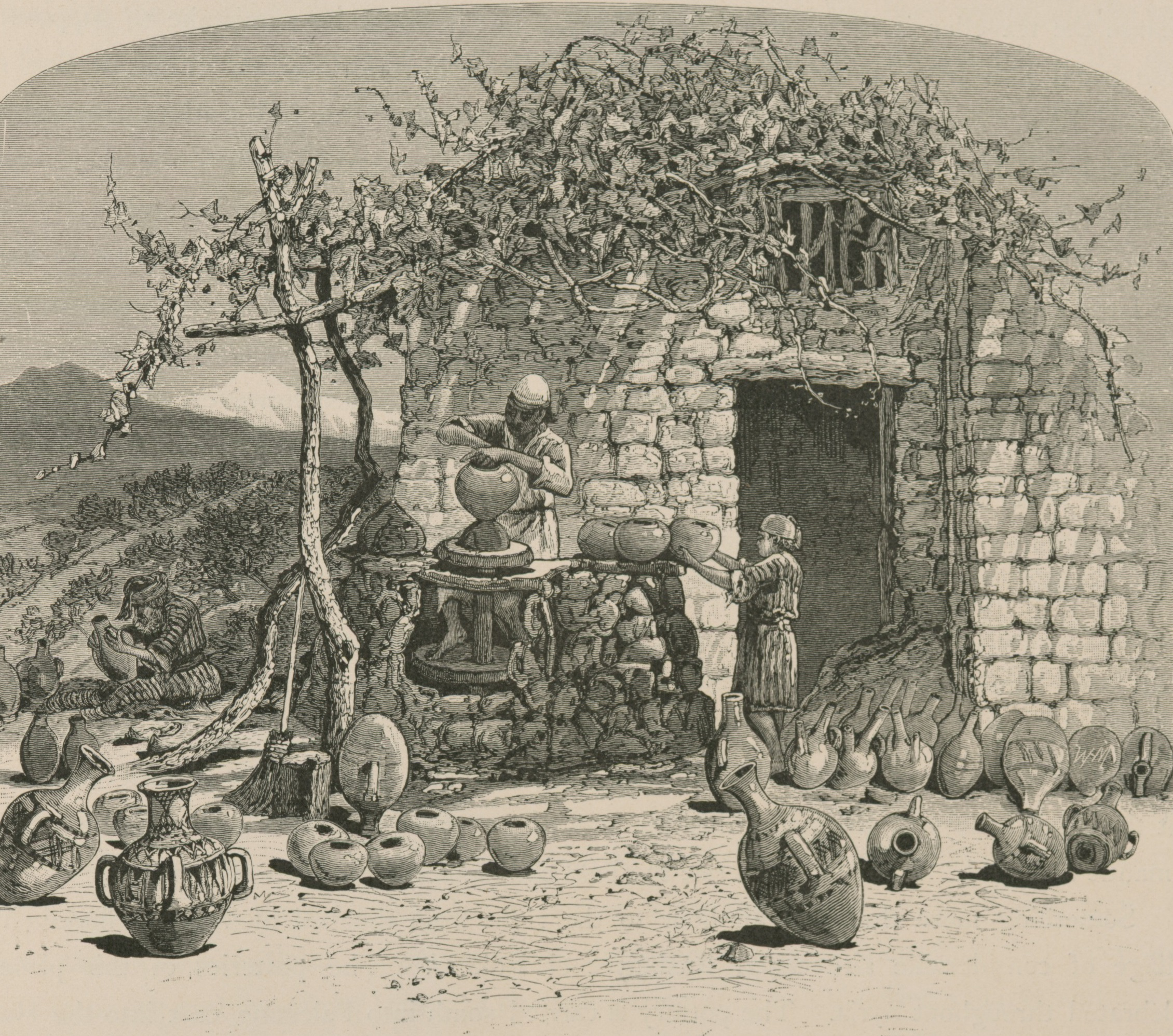
- Rashaya al-Foukhar, in the 1880s

- Location within Lebanon
- Coordinates: 33°21′12″N 35°40′02″E
- Grid position: 148/157 L
- Country: Lebanon
- Governorate: Nabatieh Governorate
- District: Hasbaya District
- Time zone: UTC+2 (EET)
  - Summer (DST): UTC+3 (EEST)
- Dialing code: +961

Rashaya al-Foukhar, (Arabic: راشيا الفخار, romanized: Rāshayā al-Fūkhār) is a municipality in the district of Hasbaya in the Nabatiye Governorate in southern Lebanon. It is located on the western slopes of Mount Hermon at an altitude starting at 750 m with the highest summit being at 1,250 m. The population is Greek Orthodox.

== History ==
In 1838, during the Ottoman era, Eli Smith noted the population of Rashaya al-Foukhar as being "Greek" Christians.

In 1852 Edward Robinson noted: "The village is celebrated for its pottery; for the manufacture of which it is one of the chief seats. There are many large dome-shaped furnaces for burning of ware; and many specimens were standing outside of the houses [..], tall jars, and the like. This pottery is sent around to all the fairs of the country, and far into the Hauran; as also to Hums and Hamah."

In 1875, Victor Guérin found here a town with 700 inhabitants, mostly "Schismatic Greek". He also noted the pottery production, and that there was a small Protestant mission in the place.

In 1990, U.S missionary William Robinson was killed here by masked gunmen.

== Demographics ==
In 2014 Christians made up 97.81% of registered voters in Rashaya al-Foukhar. 49.31% of the voters were Greek Orthodox, 24.95% were Greek Catholics and 12.66% were Maronite Catholics.

== Bibliography ==
- Guérin, V. (1880). Description Géographique Historique et Archéologique de la Palestine (in French). Vol. 3: Galilee, pt. 2. Paris: L'Imprimerie Nationale.
- Robinson, E.; Smith, E. (1841). Biblical Researches in Palestine, Mount Sinai and Arabia Petraea: A Journal of Travels in the year 1838. Vol. 3. Boston: Crocker & Brewster.
- Robinson, E.; Smith, E. (1856). Later Biblical Researches in Palestine and adjacent regions: A Journal of Travels in the year 1852. London: John Murray.
- Wilson, C.W., ed. (c. 1881). Picturesque Palestine, Sinai and Egypt. Vol. 2. New York: D. Appleton.
