= Timeline of the Gaza war (16 May 2025 – 19 August 2025) =

- Initial attacks; (7–27 October 2023); Invasion of the Gaza Strip; (28 October 2023 – 23 November 2023); First ceasefire; (24 November 2023 – 11 January 2024); Yemen airstrikes; (12 January 2024 – 6 May 2024); Rafah offensive; (7 May 2024 – 12 July 2024); Al-Mawasi attack; (13 July 2024 – 26 September 2024); Attack on Hezbollah headquarters; (27 September 2024 – 16 October 2024); Killing of Yahya Sinwar; (17 October 2024 – 26 November 2024); Israel–Lebanon ceasefire agreement; (27 November 2024 – 18 January 2025); Israel–Hamas ceasefire agreement; (19 January 2025 – 17 March 2025); March 2025 Israeli attacks on the Gaza Strip; (18 March 2025 – 15 May 2025); May 2025 Gaza offensive; (16 May 2025 – 19 August 2025); August 2025 Gaza offensive; (20 August 2025 – 2 October 2025); October 2025 Israel–Hamas ceasefire agreement; (3 October 2025 – present)

== May ==
=== 16 May ===
- Gaza health officials said that over 100 people including women and children were killed in Israeli attacks in Gaza.
- The IDF said that it conducted airstrikes on more than 150 militant targets including anti-tank missile launch posts, cells and buildings used to conduct attacks on its forces. It also said that it killed several militants who were at an observation post during ground operations in north Gaza, destroyed several tunnel shafts and other infrastructure and killed several militants during ground operations in Rafah and killed militants attempting to plant a bomb in the Morag Corridor.
- The IDF said that it conducted attacks on Hudaydah Port and Port of Salif in response to Houthi attacks on Israel, and destroyed infrastructure at ports controlled by Houthis and used for weapons transfers. The Houthi-controlled Health Ministry stated that one person was killed and nine others were wounded in the airstrikes.
- Israeli forces issued evacuation orders for residents of Gaza to move south.
- UN's Interim Forces in Lebanon (UNIFIL) said that a “large group of individuals” confronted UN troops in South Lebanon during a routine patrol and called the Lebanese government to ensure there are no obstructions to the peacekeeping force.
- An Israeli police officer was injured in a stabbing attack in the Old City of Jerusalem. The attacker was shot dead by Israeli police.

=== 17 May ===
- The Gaza Health Ministry reported that at least 153 people were killed in Israeli attacks throughout Gaza in the past 24 hours, increasing its count of the Palestinian death toll in Gaza to 53,272. (Note: Casualty count includes both militants and civilians. For further information see Casualties of the Gaza war § Civilian to combatant ratio.)
- Israeli forces announced that they started a major offensive in Gaza.
- The IDF said that it downed a drone apparently launched by the Houthis.
- Al Jazeera reported that an Israeli strike hit a vehicle carrying people evacuating from eastern Khan Yunis, killing an elderly man and his two grandchildren.
- One person was killed in an Israeli drone strike on a car in Tyre District. The IDF said that it killed a Hezbollah commander who was involved in restoring Hezbollah's capabilities in the Beaufort Castle area.
- Gaza rescuers said that an Israeli strike hit a tent west of Khan Yunis, killing one person and injuring five others including a girl, a young woman and a pregnant woman.
- Al Jazeera reported that an Israeli strike hit a house in Jabalia, killing four children.
- The IDF said that it destroyed a "strategic" Hamas tunnel measuring 2 km while operating in north Gaza.
- Al Jazeera reported that IDF fire hit an elderly Palestinian man in the vicinity of the entrance to Jenin refugee camp, injuring him.
- Al Jazeera reported that an Israeli strike hit Deir el-Balah, killing nine family members including three children.

=== 18 May ===
- The Gaza Health Ministry reported that at least 67 people were killed in Israeli attacks throughout Gaza in the past 24 hours, increasing its count of the Palestinian death toll in Gaza to 53,339.
- The IDF said that it downed a ballistic missile fired towards Israel by the Houthis. Israeli media outlet Channel 12 reported, citing the IDF that a second unsuccessful missile launch was attempted from Yemen. The Houthis said that they launched a hypersonic Palestine 2 missile and a Zulfiqar missile towards Ben Gurion Airport.
- The Gaza Health Ministry reported that least 151 Palestinians, including children were killed in Israeli strikes in Gaza.
- Al Jazeera reported that at least five more Palestinian journalists were included among those killed in Israeli strikes in recent days.
- Gaza media outlets reported that a lecturer who was the brother of former Hamas leader Yahya Sinwar and de facto leader of Hamas in the Gaza Strip Muhammad Sinwar was seriously wounded in an airstrike which hit a tent in Nuseirat along with his three children.
- NNA reported that an Israeli drone hit a car in the vicinity of a Lebanese army checkpoint in Beit Yahoun, injuring two people including a Lebanese soldier.
- The Gaza Health Ministry reported that all public hospitals in north Gaza went out of service.
- The IDF announced that it started a "broad" ground offensive in Gaza. It said that the IAF launched strikes on 670 Hamas targets in the last week including weapons depots, militant cells, tunnels and anti-tank launch sites, killed dozens of militants, destroyed militant infrastructure, and holding "strategic" areas in Gaza, using five divisions.
- The IDF said that it downed one rocket fired from central Gaza towards Kissufim, while another rocket hit an open area. al-Qassam Brigades said that it launched the rockets. It later warned residents to evacuate from Al-Qarara suburb of Khan Yunis and southern Deir al-Balah.
- Israeli Prime Minister Benjamin Netanyahu announced that "basic amount" of food will be allowed into Gaza after blocking aid for more than two months.
- An Israeli strike hit a tent on Al-Barakah Street in Deir al-Balah, killing a Palestinian woman.

=== 19 May ===
- The Gaza Health Ministry reported that at least 136 people were killed in Israeli attacks throughout Gaza in the past 24 hours, increasing its count of the Palestinian death toll in Gaza to 53,486.
- At least 126 Palestinians including civilians were killed in Israeli strikes on Gaza.
- Wafa reported that a Palestinian boy was severely beaten and detained by Israeli forces in Beit Ummar.
- A commander of the Al-Nasser Salah al-Deen Brigades was killed in a clash with Israeli special forces in Khan Yunis. Israeli forces also detained his wife and child.
- The IDF said that Israeli warplanes struck more than 160 targets in Gaza in the last day including militant cells, anti-tank missile launch sites, tunnels, a weapons depot, buildings used by militant groups, booby-trapped structures and a command center.
- The IDF issed evacuation orders for Palestinians in Khan Yunis, Bani Suheila and Abasan al-Kabira to move to al-Mawasi before it launches an "unprecedented attack". It also declared the entirety of Khan Yunis as a combat zone.
- The IDF said that it destroyed a tunnel used by Hamas for an attack which killed two soldiers on 3 May in Rafah.
- An Israeli strike hit a school sheltering displaced people in Nuseirat, killing at least seven Palestinians, including a woman and a young girl and wounded 18 others including children. The IDF said that it targeted Hamas militants in a command center in the school.
- The al-Qassam Brigades claimed that several Israeli troops were killed and injured in an ambush in Atatra, Beit Lahia.
- A 16-year-old Palestinian was detained after clashes between residents and Israeli forces in Sa'ir.
- Three UNRWA employees were killed in Gaza.
- One person was killed in an Israeli drone attack in Houla. The IDF said that it killed a Redwan force militant. Three people were injured in two other incidents in the vicinity of the Lebanese border.
- The IDF announced that a soldier from 601st Combat Engineering Battalion was killed while fighting in north Gaza, increasing the IDF death toll in Gaza to 416. An IDF investigation found that he was killed after being hit by friendly fire.
- Houthis announced a "maritime blockade" against the Port of Haifa.
- An alleged Hamas militant was arrested in Denmark for purchasing drones to be used in militant attacks.

=== 20 May ===
- The Gaza Health Ministry reported that at least 87 people were killed in Israeli attacks throughout Gaza in the past 24 hours, increasing its count of the Palestinian death toll in Gaza to 53,573.
- Al Jazeera reported that an Israeli strike hit a home in Deir el-Balah, killing 12 people and several others went missing.
- Al Jazeera reported that an Israeli strike hit a petrol station in Nuseirat refugee camp, killing 15 people including children.
- The Gaza Health Ministry said that an Israeli strikes hit a house and a school serving as shelter in north Gaza, killing at least 22 people including children and women. The IDF said it struck a command center and warned civilians in advance.
- Al Jazeera reported that Israeli strikes in Khan Yunis refugee camp killed five people including three children.
- Al Jazeera reported that ten people including a 17-year-old boy were detained by Israeli forces during an operation in the West Bank.
- NNA reported that an Israeli drone strike on a motorcycle in the vicinity of Majdal Zoun killed one person and injured five others.
- The IDF said that it struck more than 100 militant targets including a tunnel, a weapons depot, militants, buildings used by militant groups including a building used by PIJ for storing weapons and observation posts. The IDF and Shin Bet also said that they killed the commander of Hamas's aerial forces in north Gaza in a strike three days prior.
- Wafa reported that dozens of people including journalists suffered suffocation during an Israeli operation in Askar al-Qadeem refugee camp, east of Nablus.
- NNA reported that firing from an Israeli drone hit fishermen in Ras an-Naqoura.
- A Palestinian paracyclist was among those killed in an Israeli strike on south Gaza.
- The Hungarian Parliament passed a bill for exiting the International Criminal Court in response to its issuance of arrest warrants against Israeli Prime Minister Benjamin Netanyahu and former Defense Minister Yoav Gallant for alleged war crimes in Gaza.
- The IDF said that it killed the commander of Hezbollah forces in Al-Mansouri in a drone strike.
- Al Jazeera reported that at least 326 deaths in Gaza were caused by malnutrition and lack of medicine since Israel's complete blockade started on 2 March.

=== 21 May ===
- The Gaza Health Ministry reported that at least 82 people were killed in Israeli attacks throughout Gaza in the past 24 hours, increasing its count of the Palestinian death toll in Gaza to 53,655.
- Hospital officials said that fourteen members from one family including eight children were included among those killed in an Israeli strikes in Khan Yunis.
- AP reported that a one-week-old infant was included among those killed in an Israeli strike in central Gaza.
- The IDF announced that a soldier from the 51st Company in the 82nd Battalion of the 7th Brigade was killed while another was injured during combat in south Gaza following the collapse of a building where their unit was operating, setting off an explosion, increasing the IDF death toll in Gaza to 417.
- The UK announced sanctions on far-right Israeli settler Daniella Weiss, whom they called the "godmother" of Israeli settler movements.
- Lebanese media reported that an Israeli drone hit a vehicle in Ain Baal. The IDF said that it killed “an experienced engineer” in Hezbollah's weapons research and development division.
- Twenty Palestinians including three women were detained by Israeli forces from the West Bank.
- Israeli forces fired at a diplomatic delegation from foreign nations visiting Jenin refugee camp. The IDF said that it fired warning shots after they deviated from an agreed route. It later apologized.
- NNA reported that an Israeli drone hit Yatar, killing one person. The IDF said that it killed a commander of Hezbollah's Radwan force.
- The IDF said that the IAF struck more than 115 targets in Gaza in the last day including a drone strike in north Gaza which killed a Nukhba Force militant in its East Jabalia Battalion who participated in the 7 October attacks, rocket launchers, buildings used by militant groups, tunnels, other infrastructure, and militant cells. It added that the Israeli Navy also conducted shelling in north Gaza to assist ground forces operating in the area.
- The IDF said that it detained a Palestinian suspected of directing the 2025 al-Funduq shooting from western Jenin.
- The IDF said that air defences downed a rocket fired from north Gaza towards Ashkelon. The PIJ claimed responsibility. The IDF later issued evacuation orders for residents of more than a dozen areas of north Gaza to move south.
- NNA reported that an Israeli strike hit Aitaroun, killing one person. It also reported that several others were injured. The IDF said that it killed a Hezbollah militant.
- The IDF announced that it killed militant who carried out a shooting attack in Brukhin which killed a pregnant Israeli woman and injured her husband on 14 May.
- The IDF said that three rockets were fired from north Gaza towards Israel, all of which fell short in Gaza.
- The IDF said that it intercepted a missile fired towards Israel from Yemen.
- Almost 90 truckloads of aid were collected by UN and dispatched to Gaza after more than two months of total Israeli blockade.

=== 22 May ===
- The Gaza Health Ministry reported that at least 107 people were killed in Israeli attacks throughout Gaza in the past 24 hours, increasing its count of the Palestinian death toll in Gaza to 53,762.
- Two hospitals in north Gaza were encircled by Israeli forces, according to hospital staff.
- Al Jazeera reported that an Israeli strike hit a warehouse sheltering displaced Palestinians in Deir el-Balah, killing at least nine people including a seven-year-old.
- Three Palestinian prisoners released as part of a hostage agreement including a PIJ militant who was sentenced to a life sentence for his involvement in a shooting which killed a seven-year-old girl in 2003 were rearrested by Israel.
- The IDF said that it demolished the house of a Palestinian militant who killed an Israeli civilian man during overnight operations in Baqat al-Hatab.
- The IDF said that it downed a ballistic missile fired towards Israel by the Houthis.
- The Ministry of Health (Palestine) said that 29 starvation-related deaths in Gaza were registered in Gaza in recent days.
- A home in the vicinity of entrance to Berin, southeast of Hebron was set on fire by settlers.
- A 33-year-old Palestinian prisoner died in an Israeli jail.
- Israeli forces arrested a paramedic and seized an ambulance at a checkpoint east of Ramallah.
- The IDF warned residents to stay away, and called them to expel Hamas "elements" allegedly hiding in civilian infrastructure, such as a hospital, tent shelters and the municipality in Deir al-Balah. It also named three prominent Hamas militants that are hiding in those areas.
- Brother of former Hamas leader Yahya Sinwar and de facto leader of Hamas in the Gaza Strip Muhammad Sinwar died from injuries sustained in an Israeli strike five days prior.
- The IDF said that it intercepted another missile fired towards Israel from Yemen.
- The IDF said that its 98th Division killed dozens of militants as part of its new offensive in Gaza and demolished almost 200 infrastructures including tunnels.
- The IDF said that a tank commander from 52nd Battalion of 401st Armored Brigade was critically injured during combat in north Gaza, while another soldier was slightly wounded after a grenade exploded during operations in south Gaza. It said that it killed militants in north Gaza as a response.
- The IDF warned to stay away from a building in Toul, Lebanon, describing it as a Hezbollah facility. It later struck the building.
- NNA reported that an Israeli strike in Rab Thalathin killed one person. The IDF said that it killed a Redwan Force militant in a drone attack.
- NNA reported that Israeli firing injured a shepherd in Wazzani.
- The IDF said that it struck a Hezbollah facility used to store weapons in Beqaa Valley.
- NNA reported Israeli strikes in Soujod, Touline, Sawanna and the Rihan Mountain.
- Al Jazeera reported that an Israeli attack killed at least six Gaza Interior Ministry police members guarding humanitarian aid from looting. The IDF said that it targeted Hamas militants. However, Gaza Government Media Media said that they were “aid security and protection teams … who were performing purely humanitarian tasks”.
- Lebanese media reported that Israeli attacks targeted Wadi al-Aziya and Deir Intar. Israeli bombardment also hit two mobile houses in Shamaa.
- Dozens of Israeli settlers set fire to almost five homes, five vehicles owned by residents and injured eight people in Bruqin.
- Palestinian hospital officials said that Israeli tanks and drones hit Al-Awda Hospital. The IDF said that it operated adjacent to the hospital.

=== 23 May ===
- The Gaza Health Ministry reported that at least 60 people were killed in Israeli attacks throughout Gaza in the past 24 hours, increasing its count of the Palestinian death toll in Gaza to 53,822.
- The IDF said that its air defences downed a missile fired by the Houthis towards Israel.
- Palestinian militants opened fire on Israeli forces in Nablus.
- Israel Border Police dismantled 27 explosive devices aimed at security personnel, arrested 20 suspects, and confiscated weapons and large amounts of ammunition in the West Bank.
- Al Jazeera reported that an Israeli strike hit a home in Jabalia, killing three people including two children.
- Al Jazeera reported that at least 50 people including an infant boy, were killed or trapped under the rubble after an Israeli strike hit a four-story residential building in Jabalia al-Balad area of north Gaza.
- Al Jazeera reported that an Israeli strike hit a home in Qizan an-Najjar, killing eight people including seven children.
- The IDF said that the IAF struck more than 75 targets in Gaza in the last day including militants, rocket launchers, buildings used by militant groups, weapon depots, and other infrastructure. It also said that ground forces killed several militants throughout Gaza and destroyed other Hamas sites.
- The IDF said that it targeted a currency exchange company funding Hamas and PIJ in overnight airstrikes in Gaza City.
- The IDF said that air defences downed one rocket fired towards Israel from Gaza.
- The IDF said it hit 15 Hezbollah targets in Lebanon overnight.
- Wafa reported that a condolence gathering was stormed by Israeli forces in Hebron.
- AP reported that an Israeli strike hit a home in Khan Yunis, killing nine children, critically injuring two others including a child and trapping two children under the rubble.

=== 24 May ===
- The Gaza Health Ministry reported that at least 79 bodies of people killed in Israeli attacks arrived in hospitals throughout Gaza in the past 24 hours, increasing its count of the Palestinian death toll in Gaza to 53,901.
- Al Jazeera reported that Israeli strikes hit a house in the vicinity of al-Qassam Mosque in Nuseirat, killing one Palestinian and injuring five others including a one-month-old infant.
- Al Jazeera reported that an Israeli strike hit a residential flat in south Gaza, killing four people including a woman and her two children.
- The IDF said that it shot and injured a Palestinian who tried to stab soldiers at a checkpoint in Hebron.
- Al Jazeera reported that an Israeli strike hit the perimeter of Al-Awda Hospital.
- The IDF said that the IAF struck more than 100 targets in Gaza in the last day including a rocket launcher used in an attack on southern Israel.
- Wafa reported that water pipes supplying Palestinian families were damaged by Israeli settlers in al-Auja waterfall, north of Jericho.
- Al Jazeera reported that several health workers and others were trapped inside Gaza European Hospital because of repeated Israeli fire.
- Wafa reported that four hectares of wheat crops were set on fire by Israeli settlers in Sebastia, Nablus.
- The World Food Programme said that over 70,000 children in Gaza face acute malnutrition.
- Al Jazeera reported that an Israeli strike hit the Israeli designated "safe zone" of al-Mawasi, killing seven Palestinians and injuring dozens of others.
- The IDF said that its entire standing army infantry and armored brigades are now deployed in Gaza.
- A four-year-old boy died due to starvation in Gaza City.
- Al Jazeera reported that groups of Israeli settlers attacked Mughayer Al-Deir in the vicinity of Deir Dibwan, injuring five Palestinians.
- Al Jazeera reported that an Israeli settler attack in Kisan, Palestine wounded seven Palestinians.
- Al Jazeera reported that an Israeli strike in the vicinity of European Gaza Hospital killed two children.
- Al Jazeera reported that an Israeli strike hit a house in Khan Yunis, killing two International Red Cross and Red Crescent Movement workers.
- Al Jazeera reported that an 11-year-old social media influencer was included among those killed in Israeli strikes in Gaza.

=== 25 May ===
- The Gaza Health Ministry reported that at least 38 bodies of people killed in Israeli attacks arrived in hospitals throughout Gaza in the past 24 hours, increasing its count of the Palestinian death toll in Gaza to 53,939.
- Al Jazeera reported that an Israeli strike hit the Israeli-designated "safe zone" of al-Mawasi, killing one person and injuring several others.
- Al Jazeera reported that an Israeli settler attack in Al-Maniya wounded seven Palestinians.
- Israeli settlers attacked vehicles belonging to Palestinians in the vicinity of Kedumim.
- Peru opened a criminal investigation into an Israeli soldier accused of war crimes in Gaza.
- Two 16-year-old Palestinian boys were detained by Israeli forces in Al-Khader.
- Al Jazeera reported that an Israeli strike hit a house in Jabalia an-Nazla, killing seven people including a male journalist.
- The IDF said that a soldier was critically injured in a fight with another soldier in north Gaza. It later suspended a soldier for beating another soldier as part of an investigation.
- The IDF said that it downed a missile fired from Yemen at Israel. The Houthis said that they fired a "hypersonic" ballistic missile at Ben Gurion Airport.
- Al Jazeera reported that an Israeli strike hit a tent camp in Deir el-Balah, killing five family members including two children.
- Al Jazeera reported that an Israeli strike hit a house in Nuseirat refugee camp, killing the operational director of Gaza Civil Defence and his wife.
- The al-Qassam and al-Quds Brigades said that they conducted several ambushes and attacks with bombs and anti-tank rockets against Israeli forces in several areas throughout Gaza.
- The IDF said that it killed a Hamas militant who served in its naval commando unit and participated in the 7 October attacks in a recent strike conducted jointly by the Southern Command, the IAF, Aman, the Navy and Shin Bet in Gaza.
- Al Jazeera reported that an Israeli strike hit a tent in Deir el-Balah, killing a mother and her children.
- Al Jazeera reported that an Israeli strike in Jabalia killed at least five people including two women and a child.
- An Israeli strike hit Fahmi Al-Jarjawi school sheltering displaced people in Daraj Quarter of Gaza City, killing at least 36 people and injuring dozens including children and women. The IDF and Shin Bet said that they targeted a Hamas and PIJ compound inside the school.
- Al Jazeera reported that an Israeli strike hit a tent in Bani Suheila, killing a child and injuring four relatives.

=== 26 May ===
- The Gaza Health Ministry reported that at least 38 bodies of people killed in Israeli attacks arrived in hospitals in Gaza in the past 24 hours, increasing its count of the Palestinian death toll in Gaza to 53,977.
- Al Jazeera reported that a Palestinian man was beaten and kidnapped by Israeli settlers from Wadi Abu Ijheesh area of Masafer Yatta.
- Jake Wood, Gaza Humanitarian Foundation's executive director resigned from the post, saying that the foundation could not adhere "to the humanitarian principles of humanity, neutrality, impartiality, and independence, which I will not abandon".
- Gaza Humanitarian Foundation said that it started aid delivery.
- Gazans reported that the IDF started ground operations and artillery fire in Deir al-Balah.
- An Israeli strike hit a house in Jabalia, killing 16 people including five women and two children.
- The IDF said that three rockets were launched from Gaza at Israeli communities in the vicinity of the border, adding that it downed one of them and two others fell inside Gaza.
- Israeli forces detained the wife of a wanted Palestinian from Dura, Hebron to force him to surrender.
- The IDF said the IAF conducted more than 200 strikes in Gaza in last 48 hours. It also said that targets included militants, weapon depots, anti-tank and sniper positions, tunnel shafts, and other infrastructure. It added that its soldiers struck a building used by Hamas as a weapons depot, an observation post, and another structure used by the group, directed drone strikes on several militants spotted in buildings in the vicinity of its forces in south Gaza and launched an airstrike strike on a building where the Nukhba Force was operating in north Gaza.
- The IDF issued order for Palestinians to evacuate from all of south Gaza excluding Mawasi humanitarian zone, Al-Amal Hospital and Nasser Hospital to move to Mawasi.
- Lebanese media reported an Israeli strike in the vicinity of Brital.
- The IDF said that it killed a cell of militants who launched mortars towards it while operating in north Gaza.
- The al-Qassam Brigades said that it targeted four Israeli soldiers using rocket-propelled grenades in al-Muntar Street of Shuja'iyya. It also said that it targeted several Merkava tanks using Al-Yassin 105 rockets in Shuja'iyya.
- The IDF called on residents to collaborate in dismantling Hamas by distributing flyers at Al-Shati refugee camp.
- Lebanese media reported that Israeli ground forces operated in the vicinity of Mais al-Jabal.

=== 27 May ===
- The Gaza Health Ministry reported that at least 79 people were killed in Israeli attacks throughout Gaza in the past 24 hours, increasing its count of the Palestinian death toll in Gaza to 54,056.
- Al Jazeera reported that an Israeli strike hit Al-Karama area of Gaza City, killing a child and wounding others.
- NNA reported that bulldozing operations were conducted by Israeli forces on the eastern outskirts of Mais al-Jabal.
- The IDF said that it downed a missile fired by the Houthis at Israel.
- Al Jazeera reported that an agricultural land was set on fire by Israeli settlers in Haris, Salfit.
- The IDF said that it shot down another ballistic missile fired towards Israel from Yemen.
- Israeli forces started raids on money exchange shops throughout the West Bank. The IDF and Israeli police said that they launched an operation aimed at seizing militant funds and detaining the owners of money exchange companies accused by Israel of funneling cash to militant groups. Four people were shot and injured by Israeli forces and tear gas injured 15 others in Nablus during the raid.
- The al-Qassam Brigades claimed that it inflicted casualties on an Israeli unit of 10 soldiers using an antipersonnel missile in al-Atatra, Beit Lahia.
- Houthis said that they launched missiles towards Ben Gurion Airport and a "vital target" east of Tel Aviv.
- Two of four sites for distributing aid were now operational in Gaza.
- Palestinian media reported that vehicles were set on fire and houses were damaged by dozens of settlers in Qaryut.
- The IDF said that it killed a Radwan Force militant in a drone strike in Majdal Zoun one day prior.
- Al Jazeera reported that a journalist was wounded in an Israeli settler attack in Al-Mughayyir, Ramallah.
- Wafa reported that an Israeli strike hit Asdaa, northwest of Khan Yunis, killing two civilians and wounding others.
- The IDF said that a reservist was critically injured by sniper fire in north Gaza. al-Qassam Brigades claimed responsibility.
- Lebanese media reported that one person was killed in an Israeli drone strike on a motorcycle in Yatar. The IDF said that it killed Hezbollah forces commander in Yatar and accused him of trying to restore Hezbollah's capabilities in the area.
- At least 10 Palestinians were killed after the Israeli forces opened fire on crowds of people while trying to get aid in Rafah by the Gaza Humanitarian Foundation, an American and Israeli-backed humanitarian organization. The IDF denied firing at Palestinians, saying that it had fired "warning shots" in an outside area to establish control over the situation.

=== 28 May ===
- The Gaza Health Ministry reported that at least 28 bodies of people killed in Israeli attacks throughout Gaza in the past 24 hours arrived at hospitals in Gaza, increasing its count of the Palestinian death toll in Gaza to 54,084.
- AFP reported that an Israeli strike hit a house in as-Saftawi, north Gaza, killing at least nine people and injuring a journalist.
- Al-Masirah reported that four Israeli attacks targeted the runway at Sanaa International Airport and a Yemenia plane. The IDF said that it hit the airport and targeted an aircraft used to transport Houthi militants.
- AFP reported that an Israeli strike hit central Gaza, killing six members of one family including children and injuring 15 others.
- Gaza Civil Defence said that an Israeli strike hit Khan Yunis, killing a civilian.
- The IDF said that it seized more than $2 million and detained more than 30 suspects in an operation one day prior in the West Bank against money exchange stores suspected of funding Hamas.
- The IDF said that the IAF struck dozens of targets throughout Gaza in the last 48 hours including a rocket launcher used to fire projectiles towards Kissufim and its soldiers operating in Gaza, militants, buildings used by militant groups, anti-tank launch posts, weapon depots, and other infrastructure. It also said that it killed several militants planning to conduct a sniper and anti-tank missile attack on its forces in south Gaza.
- Gaza Humanitarian Foundation said that it opened its second aid distribution center in Rafah.
- Israeli Prime Minister Benjamin Netanyahu said that Hamas' leader in the Gaza Strip, Muhammed Sinwar had been killed.
- The IDF said that it killed a Palestinian suspected of attacking soldiers using a "sharp object" in Jit, Qalqilya.
- Al Jazeera reported that an Israeli strike hit a vehicle in al-Nafaq street of Gaza City, killing several people including a journalist.
- Al Jazeera reported that an Israeli strike in Shuja'iyya killed a teenage boy.
- AP reported that four Palestinians died while storming a World Food Programme warehouse to get food.

=== 29 May ===
- The Gaza Health Ministry reported that at least 67 bodies of people killed in Israeli attacks throughout Gaza in the past 24 hours arrived at hospitals in Gaza, increasing its count of the Palestinian death toll in Gaza to 54,249.
- The IDF said that it demolished the house of a militant in the West Bank who conducted the Lehi Street bombing.
- Al Jazeera reported that an Israeli strike in Bureij refugee camp killed at least 23 people, injuring others and several people went missing. Israeli forces were accused by local hospital of using internationally prohibited weapons in the attack.
- Al Jazeera reported that agricultural land was vandalised by settlers east of Yatta, Hebron.
- Al Jazeera reported that an Israeli drone strike in the outskirts of Nabatieh al-Fawqa killed one person. The IDF said that it struck a Hezbollah militant in the vicinity of Beaufort Castle, Lebanon and accused him of trying to restore a major Hezbollah infrastructure in the area which had been struck several times in recent weeks. But, a Lebanese official said that a municipal worker was killed in the attack.
- The Gaza Health Ministry said that Israeli forces ordered to evacuate Jabalia's al-Awda Hospital.
- The IDF said that it destroyed a Hamas attack tunnel with several exits, some of them booby-trapped, and killed a militant cell which emerged from one of the shafts during its operation in south Gaza.
- The IDF said that the IAF struck dozens of targets in the last day including militant cells, buildings used by militant groups, observation and sniper posts, tunnels and other infrastructure. It also said that its ground troops killed several militants and destroyed weapons and other militant infrastructure, including tunnels.
- The infant of an Israeli pregnant woman who died in a shooting by a Palestinian militant in the West Bank died two weeks after emergency delivery.
- The IDF warned Palestinians in Nuseirat to stay away from several locations, saying that six prominent Hamas militants are hiding there and exploiting civilian infrastructure for combat.
- The Gaza Interior Ministry said that an Israeli strike hit Saraya Junction in central Gaza City, killing nine police officers.
- The IDF said that a Defence Ministry civilian contractor was killed during operations in Jabalia area after being by an explosive device apparently planted by militants.
- Gaza Humanitarian Foundation said that it opened a third aid distribution site in Gaza.
- NNA reported that a series of Israeli air strikes targeted areas in the vicinity of Beit Lif, Ramiyah, al-Bisariya, Wadi al-Safa and al-Sarira. The IDF said that it hit Hezbollah infrastructure in Lebanon.
- The IDF said that air defences downed a ballistic missile fired towards Israel by the Houthis, who said they targeted Ben Gurion Airport.
- The IDF said that three soldiers were slightly injured by RPG fire while operating at a building in south Gaza. It also said that it killed militants behind the attack.
- Lebanese media reported an Israeli attack in the vicinity of Bnafoul.
- The IDF warned Palestinians to evacuate from Al-Atatra, Jabalia, and Shejaiya, Daraj Quarter, and Zaytun Quarter to head west, saying that it will expand its offensive activity in the areas to dismantle the capabilities of militant organizations.
- Al Jazeera reported that a 17-year-old was included among those wounded during an Israeli operation in Idna.
- The IDF said that a soldier from the 74th Battalion of the 188th Armored Brigade was critically injured in south Gaza one day prior due to an accidental misfire.
- Arab media reported that a second person was killed in an Israeli attack in south Lebanon.

=== 30 May ===
- The Gaza Health Ministry reported that at least 72 people were killed in Israeli attacks throughout Gaza in the past 24 hours, increasing its count of the Palestinian death toll in Gaza to 54,321.
- Al Jazeera reported that an Israeli strike hit a home in Jabalia, killing at least 10 people.
- Al Jazeera reported that an Israeli strike hit a home in Jabalia al-Balad area of north Gaza, killing a woman and injuring several others.
- Al Jazeera reported that a pregnant woman was slightly injured in a settler attack in Masafer Yatta.
- The al-Qassam Brigades released a video showing a group of masked and armed men attacked with explosives in Rafah, saying that they were working undercover for Israeli forces.
- The IDF said that it bombed a site used by Hezbollah to store weapons in Beqaa Valley and accused the group of attempting to restore the site.
- The IDF said that it destroyed a Hamas tunnel measuring a kilometer during recent operations in Khan Yunis and killed several militants inside.
- The IDF said that it arrested 80 "wanted individuals", seized several weapons and seven million shekels in militant funds.
- al-Qassam Brigades and al-Quds Brigades said they launched an anti-personnel grenade towards a building housing Israeli forces in an area southeast of Khan Yunis.
- Al Jazeera reported that olive trees were set on fire by Israeli settlers in Sinjil.
- The IDF said that the IAF struck dozens of targets in Gaza in last day including militants, buildings used by militant groups, observation and sniper posts, tunnels and other militant infrastructure.
- The IDF said that it confiscated and destroyed more than 80 weapons and explosive devices which were located during operations in the Gaza in recent weeks.

=== 31 May ===
- The Gaza Health Ministry reported that at least 60 bodies of people killed in Israeli attacks arrived at hospitals throughout Gaza in the past 24 hours, increasing its count of the Palestinian death toll in Gaza to 54,381.
- A woman was detained by Israeli forces from Anabta.
- NNA reported that an Israeli drone attack on a car in Deir ez-Zahrani killed a man. The IDF said that it killed a Hezbollah rocket commander in the Beaufort Castle area and accused him of trying to restore Hezbollah infrastructure.
- Two prisoners released as part of the January 2025 Gaza war ceasefire were rearrested by Israeli forces in Idna.
- Al Jazeera reported that an Israeli strike hit a tent in Al-Shati refugee camp, killing five family members including a woman and her three children and injured 13 more which are being treated in al-Shifa Hospital.
- al-Quds Brigades said that its mortar barrage targeted a gathering of Israeli forces and vehicles advancing southeast of Khan Yunis.
- The IDF said that the IAF struck dozens of targets in the Gaza, including militants and infrastructure used by Hamas, and killed a prominent Hamas militant involved in producing weapons in a drone attack in Sabra, Gaza one day prior. It added that its Paratroopers Brigade killed a cell of four militants the previous day and destroyed several explosive devices in their operational area.
- The IDF said that it opened an investigation after its vehicles crashed into a Palestinian minibus in Jenin.
- Palestinians were reportedly assaulted by Israeli settlers in Khirbet al-Tuba, south of Hebron.
- The IDF said that three rockets launched from Gaza struck open areas in the vicinity of the border.
- The IDF and Shin Bet confirmed the death of leader of Hamas in the Gaza Strip Mohammed Sinwar, al-Qassam Brigades' Rafah Brigade commander Muhammad Shabana and the al-Qassam Brigades' South Khan Yunis Battalion commander.
- The IDF reissued warnings to evacuate Rafah and Khan Yunis.

== June ==
=== 1 June ===
- The Gaza Health Ministry reported that at least 32 people were killed in Israeli attacks throughout Gaza in the past 24 hours, increasing its count of the Palestinian death toll in Gaza to 54,418.
- A doctor who lost nine of their 10 children in an Israeli strike on their house died from injuries sustained in the attack.
- The IDF said that it destroyed a Hamas tunnel measuring 700 metres, killed dozens of militants and destroyed more than 100 infrastructures used by militant groups in Khan Yunis.
- An Israeli drone strike hit a motorcycle in Arnoun, killing one person. The IDF said that it killed a militant from Hezbollah's anti-tank unit.
- At least 31 people were killed and more than 170 others were injured including women and children as they were on their way to a Gaza Humanitarian Foundation aid distribution site. The IDF denied that fired towards civilians in the vicinity or within the site in the Rafah. An IDF official told the AP that soldiers fired warning shots towards several suspects advancing at them overnight.
- The IDF said that the IAF struck dozens of targets in the Gaza Strip, including militants, booby-trapped structures and other buildings used by militant groups, tunnels, and sniper and anti-tank posts in the last day, and destroyed the remains of a booby-trapped building where a soldier was killed in May.
- Al Jazeera reported that an Israeli attack hit a car in Beit Lif, injuring one person.
- The IDF said that its drone attack killed an al-Qassam Brigades commander who led the deadliest attack on soldiers since the start of the war.
- The IDF said that air defences downed a ballistic missile fired towards Israel by the Houthis, who said that they targeted Ben Gurion Airport.
- Al Jazeera reported that an Israeli strike hit a telecommunications hub in Bani Suheila, injuring two civilians.
- IDF chief Eyal Zamir ordered to expand ground offensive in additional areas of Gaza.
- The IDF struck al-Mawasi, with the Kuwaiti Field Hospital reporting one dead Palestinian and 30 others wounded. The IDF did not report this strike until questioned by the BBC, whereupon the IDF told the BBC that they had "wrongfully hit the Mawasi area" with artillery that "deviated" after "technical and operational errors".
- Al Jazeera reported that an Israeli strike hit a vehicle on Debl road of Bint Jbeil District, killing one person.
- The IDF said that its drone killed a militant from Hezbollah's rocket unit.
- The IDF said that Palestinian gunmen shot at aid seekers in Khan Younis.

=== 2 June ===
- The Gaza Health Ministry reported that at least 51 people were killed in Israeli attacks throughout Gaza and body of one person killed in a previous Israeli attack was recovered from the rubble in the past 24 hours, increasing its count of the Palestinian death toll in Gaza to 54,470.
- Al Jazeera reported that an Israeli strike in Tel al-Hawa killed a child.
- Al Jazeera reported that nine people were arrested by Israeli forces from Dura, Hebron.
- Wafe reported that a boy died from injuries sustained in an Israeli strike which hit a house in Deir el-Balah and killed his other relatives.
- Al Jazeera reported that an Israeli strike hit the Israeli-designated humanitarian safe zone of al-Mawasi, killing four people and wounding dozens.
- The al-Quds Brigades claimed that it shelled Israeli forces near the customs police area southeast of Khan Yunis in cooperation with the Al-Aqsa Martyrs Brigades.
- The IDF said that it expanded its ground offensive in Gaza in past day, killed militants, destroyed many weapon depots and militant infrastructure, above and under ground. It also said that the IAF struck dozens of targets across Gaza in the past day, including militant cells, buildings used by militant groups, tunnels, weapon depots, and other infrastructure.
- Reuters reported that Israeli fire killed at least three people and injured dozens of others in the vicinity of a Gaza Humanitarian Foundation aid distribution site. The IDF said that it fired warning shots "to prevent several suspects approaching them".
- The al-Qassam Brigades said that it shelled a group of Israeli troops east of Al-Qarara two days prior. It also said that it targeted the Israeli Ein al-Thalatha site east of the same area using three short-range Rajum missiles.
- al-Qassam Brigades said that it engaged in "fierce clashes" with Israeli forces in north Gaza.
- The AP reported that an Israeli strike hit a residential building in Jabalia refugee camp, killing 14 people including seven children and five women.
- Gaza media reported that an Israeli strike in Deir al-Balah, killed at least three people. The IDF said that it targeted a Hamas command and control center.
- A 15-year-old teenager was shot and killed in Sinjil. The IDF said that it shot a Palestinian suspected of planning to hurl rocks towards a highway.
- Gaza medical sources said that an Israeli strike hit a home in Nuseirat refugee camp, reportedly killing a woman and her three children.
- The IDF ordered residents to evacuate from several blocks in west Khan Yunis.
- The IDF said that it downed a ballistic missile fired towards Israel by the Houthis, who said that they targeted Ben Gurion Airport.
- Al Jazeera reported that a 17-year-old teenager was wounded during an Israeli raid in Beit Furik.

=== 3 June ===
- The Gaza Health Ministry reported that at least 40 people were killed in Israeli attacks throughout Gaza in the past 24 hours, increasing its count of the Palestinian death toll in Gaza to 54,510.
- The IDF reported that three soldiers of the Givati Brigade were killed and two others were moderately injured the day prior by an explosive device while operating in Jabalia, increasing the IDF death toll in Gaza to 423. Per an initial IDF investigation, five soldiers were in a Humvee in the area when they were hit by an explosive device planted there by militants.
- Gaza officials said that Israeli fire killed at least 27 people while waiting for aid distribution in Rafah. The IDF said that it opened fire on suspects 500 meters away from approved route.
- Al Jazeera reported that an Israeli strike hit a home in Nuseirat refugee camp, killing a child and injuring others.
- The IDF said that the IAF struck dozens of militant targets throughout Gaza, including militants, buildings used by militant groups, tunnels, and other infrastructure that threatened its forces. It also said that the 215th Artillery Regiment killed a Hamas militant at a weapons depot.
- Wafa reported that dozens of olive trees were destroyed by Israeli settlers in Kafr Malik.
- The IDF said that it downed a ballistic missile fired towards Israel by the Houthis, who said that they launched a hypersonic ballistic missile towards Ben Gurion airport.
- The IDF said that two rockets fired from southern Syria hit open areas in the Golan Heights. It responded by shelling the source of the launch. Martyr Mohammed Deif Brigades said that it launched the rockets. The IDF later said that it conducted a wave of airstrikes across southern Syria targeting weapons owned by the Syrian transitional government, which reported “significant human and material losses” in Daraa Governorate.
- Israeli forces dropped leaflets warning residents to leave their houses in some areas of Khan Yunis and move west, saying it would fight Hamas and other militant groups in these areas.
- al-Quds Brigades claimed that it destroyed an Israeli vehicle with a highly explosive barrel bomb in Qizan an-Najjar on 3 June.

=== 4 June ===
- The Gaza Health Ministry reported that at least 95 people were killed in Israeli attacks throughout Gaza in the past 24 hours and two other bodies were recovered from rubble in Gaza, increasing its count of the Palestinian death toll in Gaza to 54,607.
- The IDF said that a reservist from the 6646th Battalion of the 646th Reserve Paratroopers Brigade was killed in combat in Shuja'iyya one day prior, increasing the IDF death toll in Gaza to 425. Another reservist from the battalion was critically injured in the same incident.
- The IDF said that an explosive device was dropped with a drone by Hamas on forces operating in Jabalia one day prior, moderately injuring two soldiers from the Yahalom combat engineering unit and slightly injuring a Shin Bet officer.
- Al Jazeera reported that an Israeli strike hit a school serving as shelter for displaced people in Khan Yunis, killing at least 18 people including children.
- Al Jazeera reported that 19 people including activists were detained by Israeli forces from the West Bank.
- Al Jazeera reported that an Israeli strike in southwest Gaza City killed a man and his children.
- The Mujahideen Brigades said that an Israeli strike killed a member of its military council who was also its Central Governorate Brigade's head.
- The al-Quds Brigades claimed that it hit a group of Israeli soldiers southeast of Jabalia using two missiles.
- The al-Qassam Brigades claimed that it set fire to an Israeli tank south of Khan Yunis using an Al-Yassin 105 missile.
- Al Jazeera reported that a 70-year-old Gazan man died in Israeli custody.
- The IDF said that the IAF downed a drone fired towards Israel “from the east” above Be'er Milka. The Houthis said that they fired two drones towards Ben Gurion Airport, indicating that the second one likely crashed prior to reaching Israel.
- Al Jazeera reported that an Israeli strike hit al-Mawasi, killing three people including two children.
- Palestinian media reported that 35 people were wounded and buildings were set on fire in a settler attack in Deir Dibwan.
- The IDF warned against approaching areas in north Gaza, including Beit Lahia, Jabalia and Beit Hanoun, saying that they are combat zones.
- Gaza media source reported that Israel tried to kill Izz al-Din al-Haddad, who is one of the leading figures in Hamas.

=== 5 June ===
- The Gaza Health Ministry reported that at least 70 people were killed in Israeli attacks throughout Gaza in the past 24 hours, increasing its count of the Palestinian death toll in Gaza to 54,677.
- The bodies of hostages Gadi Haggai and Judih Weinstein were recovered by the IDF and Shin Bet from Gaza.
- Lebanese media reported that an Israeli drone attack hit a vehicle in Qalaouiyeh, injuring one person.
- Al Jazeera reported that an Israeli attack hit al-Nasser Street, in the vicinity of al-Shifa Hospital compound west of Gaza City, killing at least three people including children and women and injuring others.
- Al Jazeera reported that an Israeli strike hit Al-Ahli Arab Hospital, killing three journalists and critically wounded many others including a journalist. The IDF said that it targeted a PIJ militant operating in a command and control center in the hospital.
- Al Jazeera reported that an Israeli strike in the vicinity of Bureij wounded a child.
- Israeli Prime Minister Benjamin Netanyahu confirmed that his government armed clans in Gaza that opposed Hamas including one led by Yasser Abu Shabab.
- The IDF issued evacuation orders for four buildings and nearby areas in the southern suburbs of Beirut, saying that it will target Hezbollah "underground infrastructure". It later carried out the attacks.
- The IDF said that it downed a ballistic missile fired towards Israel by the Houthis, who said that they targeted Ben Gurion Airport.
- The IDF issued evacuation orders for two areas in Ain Qana, saying there are Hezbollah facilities in the area. A drone attack was later reported there.
- The Trump administration sanctioned four International Criminal Court judges for probing alleged Israeli war crimes in Gaza, the West Bank and East Jerusalem and alleged US war crimes in Afghanistan.
- Israeli forces detained seven journalists belonging to BBC News Arabic in the occupied Syrian town of Quneitra in the Golan Heights.

=== 6 June ===
- Al Jazeera reported that an Israeli strike hit northwest of Khan Yunis, killing a child.
- The IDF ordered some residents to evacuate north Gaza.
- The IDF said that movement toward Gaza Humanitarian Foundation sites is only allowed between 6 a.m. and 6 p.m. daily.
- The IDF said that four soldiers were killed and five were injured including one critically by a blast in a building in Khan Yunis, increasing the IDF death toll in Gaza to 429. Per an initial IDF investigation, the soldiers entered a booby-trapped building to clear it of possible militant infrastructure and the blast caused the building to collapse on the soldiers.
- The al-Qassam Brigades said that it, along with the al-Quds Brigades shelled Israeli forces south of Khan Yunis.
- AFP reported that an Israeli strike in Jabalia killed 11 people.

=== 7 June ===
- The Gaza Health Ministry reported that at least 95 people were killed in Israeli attacks throughout Gaza in the past 48 hours, increasing its count of the Palestinian death toll in Gaza to 54,772.
- The IDF said that a reservist from the 646th Paratroopers Brigade was moderately injured by a shell launched by militants in Shuja'iyya. It issued evacuation orders for a small area in Gaza City after the attack which was already covered in an earlier evacuation order.
- The body of Thai hostage Natthapong Pinta was recovered by Israel.
- Palestinian media reported that an Israeli strike hit a tent camp in Khan Yunis, killing 12 people and injuring almost 40 others.
- An Israeli strike hit a building in Sabra, Gaza, reportedly killing at least 16 people including children and women, injuring at least 50 others and trapping almost 85 under the rubble. Mujahideen Brigades chief As'ad Abu Shari'a, whom the IDF said that participated in the 7 October attacks, was killed in this strike.
- AP reported that an Israeli strike hit an apartment in north Gaza, killing seven people including five children and a woman.
- AP reported that at least six people were killed while on their way to obtain food assistance. The IDF said that despite earlier warnings that the area is an active combat zone between 6 p.m. and 6 a.m, several suspects tried to approach its forces operating in the Tel al-Sultan area overnight “in a manner that posed a threat to the troops”. The army also said that its forces called to drive them away but as they continued advancing they fired warning shots. It added that it is aware of reports of casualties. An unnamed IDF official said that warning shots were fired almost one kilometer from Gaza Humanitarian Foundation aid distribution site.
- The IDF ordered residents to evacuate Abd al-Rahman neighborhood of Gaza City and al-Nahda neighborhood of Jabalia refugee camp.
- The IDF, Shin Bet and Israeli police said that they detained a suspected prominent militant from a network in Burqin and thwarted an imminent attack.
- The al-Quds Brigades said that it targeted Israeli forces and vehicles in an area northeast of Khan Yunis and in Tal al-Zaatar area of Jabalia refugee camp.

=== 8 June ===
- The Gaza Health Ministry reported that at least 108 people were killed in Israeli attacks throughout Gaza in the past 24 hours, increasing its count of the Palestinian death toll in Gaza to 54,880.
- Al Jazeera reported that an Israeli strike hit tents in al-Mawasi area of Khan Yunis, killing five people including two girls.
- Al Jazeera reported that an Israeli strike in the Al-Atatra neighborhood of Beit Lahia injured an elderly man and a girl.
- The Syrian Observatory for Human Rights said that an Israeli attack hit a vehicle in Beit Jinn, killing one person and wounding two others. The IDF said that it targeted a Hamas militant.
- The IDF said that it killed a Hamas-run police station chief who participated in the Nova music festival massacre in an airstrike on 31 May, and targeted dozens of Hamas militants in airstrikes in Khan Yunis. It added that a killed several militants at a command center and struck dozens more targets, including weapon depots, tunnels, and militants in airstrikes in the last day.
- Reservists from the IDF's Hasmonean Brigade entered Gaza for the first time to participate in the offensive.
- At least 12 people were killed as they headed towards two Gaza Humanitarian Foundation aid distribution points. The IDF said that it fired warning shots towards those who approached it.
- NNA reported that an Israeli drone strike hit a motorcycle on a road between Chehabiyeh and Kfar Dounin, in the vicinity of Tyre, killing one person.
- The IDF said that it found leader of Hamas in the Gaza Strip Mohammed Sinwar's body in an "underground passageway beneath the European Hospital" in Khan Yunis.

=== 9 June ===
- The Gaza Health Ministry reported that at least 47 people were killed in Israeli attacks throughout Gaza in the past 24 hours, increasing its count of the Palestinian death toll in Gaza to 54,927.
- The IDF, Shin Bet and Israeli police said that they arrested 35 suspects from an explosives laboratory that it destroyed in Tulkarm and seized weapons and funds related to militant activity.
- The passengers of the Madleen were intercepted by Israeli forces on its way to the Gaza Strip while under a blockade with activists including Greta Thunberg detained. Israeli authorities stated that all of the activists would be returned to their home countries.
- The IDF said that it found and destroyed a tunnel measuring a mile in Khan Yunis. It also said that it destroyed a weapons depot and dozens of buildings which had been booby-trapped with five tonnes of explosives by Hamas.
- The IDF said that it killed 15 militants in clashes in Khan Yunis in the last day, and struck dozens more targets, including tunnels and militants throughout Gaza.
- Lebanese media reported that an Israel drone attack hit a car in Al-Numairiyah.
- Gaza's Health Ministry and local hospitals reported that 14 people were killed while heading towards a Gaza Humanitarian Foundation food distribution center.
- The IDF issued evacuation orders for north Gaza, including Jabalia to move to Gaza City.
- The IDF ordered to evacuate Hudaydah Port, Port of Salif and Ras Isa Port, saying that they are used by the Houthis for militant activities.
- Al Jazeera reported that an Israeli strike in Tuffah killed three paramedics and a journalist.

=== 10 June ===
- The Israeli Navy launched attacks on Houthi territory in Yemen for the first time, targeting the port of Hodeidah.
- Al Jazeera reported that an Israeli strike hit a tent in al-Mawasi, killing three people.
- The IDF said that air defences downed one rocket fired from both Gaza towards south Israel. It later issued evacuation order for four neighborhoods in north Gaza to move to Gaza City, saying that the rocket was launched from the area.
- The IDF said it destroyed more than 1,200 militant infrastructures in Khuza'a, Khan Yunis.
- Thirty-six people were reportedly killed and 207 others were wounded while waiting for aid in the vicinity of Netzarim Corridor. The IDF said that it fired warning shots towards "suspects who were advancing in the area of Wadi Gaza and posed a threat to the troops".
- The IDF said a drone attack targeted two Hamas militants disguised as women during recent operations in north Gaza. It also said that it found a rocket launcher and other weapons owned by Hamas.
- The IDF said that two Palestinians were killed and four soldiers were wounded while trying to snatch a soldier's gun in Nablus.
- Australia, Canada, New Zealand, Norway and the UK announced sanctions against Israeli far-right National Security Minister Itamar Ben Gvir and Israeli far-right Finance Minister Bezalel Smotrich for "inciting violence against Palestinians in the West Bank". In response, Smotrich ordered the cancellation of a waiver allowing bank ties between Israel and the Palestinian Authority.
- NNA reported that an Israeli drone strike in the vicinity of Shebaa, killed two people and injured another person. The IDF said that it killed a Hezbollah militant and a Lebanese Resistance Brigades militant and accused them of violating the ceasefire.
- The IDF said that it downed a ballistic missile fired towards Israel by the Houthis.

=== 11 June ===
- The Gaza Health Ministry reported that at least 120 people were killed in Israeli attacks throughout Gaza in the past 24 hours, increasing its count of the Palestinian death toll in Gaza to 55,104.
- Israeli forces opened fire in the vicinity of an aid distribution center near Netzarim Corridor, reportedly killing at least 25 people and injuring more than 100 others. The IDF said that it fired warning shots towards suspects who approached it and “posed a threat".
- One person was killed and at least 10 others including two teenage brothers were detained by Israeli forces from West Bank. PIJ said that the person killed in Tammun was one of its senior members. The IDF said that it also arrested two other militants from a local network in an operation jointly conducted with Shin Bet and Israeli police special operations unit in the same area.
- Al Jazeera reported that an Israeli strike hit near the Jordanian field hospital west of Khan Yunis, injuring a Jordanian doctor.
- The al-Quds Brigades said that it engaged in "fierce clashes" with Israeli forces in an area north of Khan Yunis.
- The al-Qassam Brigades claimed that it killed an IDF soldier in the vicinity of Abasan al-Kabira.
- The IDF said that two soldiers were moderately injured during a gun battle with a militant in Khan Yunis.
- An Israeli drone attack hit a car in Beit Lif, killing at least one person and injuring three others. The IDF said that it killed a Radwan Force militant.
- The bodies of Israeli hostages Yair Yaakov and Aviv Atzili were recovered by the IDF in a joint operation with Shin Bet.
- The IDF said that an officer and a soldier were moderately injured after an RGP hit a tank they were in during combat in Khan Yunis.

=== 12 June ===
- The Gaza Health Ministry reported that at least 29 people were killed in Israeli attacks throughout Gaza in the past 24 hours, increasing its count of the Palestinian death toll in Gaza to 55,207.
- The IDF said that it killed two militants and arrested 10 wanted Palestinians in a nearly 30-hour raid in central Nablus. It added that it located a number of weapons, including makeshift guns, and ammunition, and "much inciting material".
- Gaza Humanitarian Foundation accused Hamas of killing its eight employees and injuring multiple others in attack on a bus while traveling to a food distribution point west of Khan Yunis. However, International Red Cross and Red Crescent Movement denied GHF's claim that Red Cross was involved in evacuating its killed and injured employees. A Hamas-run police force unit claimed that it killed 12 Palestinian members of the Israeli-backed Popular Forces.
- The IDF said that it arrested suspected Hamas militants from Beit Jinn.
- The IDF said that it killed a cell of Hamas militants which injured two soldiers in an RPG attack in Khan Yunis one day prior and killed several militants moving weapons in a drone strike.
- CIA analyst Asif William Rahman was sentenced to three years' imprisonment in a US court for leaking classified documents about Israeli strike plans on Iran.
- The IDF released documents allegedly drawn up by Hamas, saying that it proves that Hamas maintained a policy of confiscating 15%-25% of aid.
- The IDF said that it hit Hamas militants operating in a weapons manufacturing plant in Al-Shati refugee camp.
- The IDF said that it "neutralized" a Palestinian militant who opened fire on its forces in the vicinity of Hermesh.
- Palestinian media reported that Israeli fire killed almost 32 people as they approached a Gaza Humanitarian Foundation aid site. The IDF said that it fired “warning shots” towards a crowd of Gazans which approached them and “posed a threat”.
- The IDF issued new evacuation orders for south Gaza to move west and slightly expanded a no-go zone, saying that it is operating in these areas to dismantle militant capabilities.
- Lebanese media reported Israeli strikes in the vicinity of Al-Baisariyah and Tebna, south of Sidon.
- An Israeli drone strike hit a motorcycle in Nabatieh al-Fawqa, killing one person. NNA also reported several Israeli airstrikes throughout south Lebanon.
- The IDF issued evacuation orders for several neighborhoods in central Gaza.

=== 13 June ===
- The IDF said that two soldiers from the 601st Combat Engineering Battalion were critically injured during a gun battle with militants during combat in north Gaza.
- The IDF reiterated its evacuation orders for a large part of Gaza.
- A ballistic missile was fired from Yemen to Israel. The IDF said that the missile landed in the vicinity of Sa'ir. Missile shrapnel wounded at least five Palestinians including three children.

=== 14 June ===
- The Gaza Health Ministry reported that at least 90 people were killed in Israeli attacks throughout Gaza in the past 48 hours, increasing its count of the Palestinian death toll in Gaza to 55,297.
- The IDF said that it intercepted three drones apparently fired from Yemen.
- The IDF said that two rockets fired from Gaza hit open areas in the vicinity of the border fence.
- The IDF issued evacuation orders for Khan Yunis, Abasan al-Kabira and Bani Suhaila to move west to humanitarian area, saying it would forcefully work against militant organisations in the area.
- The IDF said that two rockets fired from south Gaza towards south Israel hit open areas.
- Gaza health officials reported that Israeli strikes in Khan Yunis killed at least 16 people including five women.
- Local hospitals said that Israeli fire killed at least 15 people near a Gaza Humanitarian Foundation aid distribution point in the vicinity of Netzarim Corridor. The IDF said that it opened fire on an individual after he advanced towards its forces and ignored warning shots fired in the vicinity of a group.
- The IDF said that a Houthi leadership meeting in Yemen including Houthi forces's commander Muhammad Abd Al-Karim Al-Ghamari was targeted in a strike in Yemen.

=== 15 June ===
- The Gaza Health Ministry reported that at least 65 bodies of people killed in Israeli attacks arrived at hospitals throughout Gaza in the past 24 hours, increasing its count of the Palestinian death toll in Gaza to 55,362.
- The IDF said that a commander from the Kfir Brigade was killed during combat in south Gaza, increasing the IDF death toll in Gaza to 430. Another soldier was slightly wounded in the same incident.
- Al Jazeera reported that lands in Huwara were ignited by Israeli settlers before opening fire on civil defense personnel approaching to extinguish the fire, while the head of the village of Khirbet Ibziq, northeast of Tubas, said Israeli settlers stole a water tanker in the area at dawn. Israeli forces installed an iron gate at the entrance of Hizma, in the northeast of East Jerusalem, to restrict the movement of Palestinians in the area.
- Medics said that an Israeli strike hit a home in Nuseirat refugee camp, killing at least 11 people.
- The IDF said that one rocket fired from south Gaza struck an open area in south Israel.

=== 16 June ===
- The Gaza Health Ministry reported that at least 68 bodies of people killed in Israeli attacks arrived at hospitals throughout Gaza in the past 24 hours, increasing its count of the Palestinian death toll in Gaza to 55,432.
- Israel announced that a captain of the Golani Brigade who was also a Shin Bet combat commander was killed by an explosive device in Khan Yunis, increasing the IDF death toll in Gaza to 431.

=== 17 June ===
- The Gaza Health Ministry reported that at least 61 bodies of people killed in Israeli attacks arrived at hospitals throughout Gaza in the past 24 hours, increasing its count of the Palestinian death toll in Gaza to 55,493.
- The IDF said that a soldier from the Golani Brigade's 12th Battalion was killed during combat in south Gaza one day prior, increasing the IDF death toll in Gaza to 432. It also said that 10 others were injured, including four critically in the same incident. Per an initial IDF investigation, the soldiers were in an armored personnel carrier while operating in Khan Yunis, when a militant placed an explosive device on the outside of the vehicle.
- The Gaza Health Ministry reported that Israeli fire killed at least 51 people in Khan Yunis. The IDF said that it may have opened fire on Gazans who approached its forces.
- The IDF said that it demolished the house of a Palestinian militant who killed an Israeli boy in a gun attack on a bus in the West Bank in 2024.
- The IDF said that it advanced to Kafr Jabalia area of Jabalia for the first time in its ground offensive. It also said that it killed numerous militants and destroyed several tunnel shafts and rocket launchers.
- The IDF said that two rockets fired from south Gaza fell in open areas in south Israel.
- Middle East Eye reported that an Israeli strike hit a home in Bureij refugee camp, killing at least four people including children and women.
- The IDF issued a new evacuation order in south Gaza, expanding a large no-go zone slightly.
- Tunnel under the European hospital in Gaza, was sealed using concrete to avoid damage to the hospital.

=== 18 June ===
- The Gaza Health Ministry reported that at least 144 bodies of people killed in Israeli attacks arrived at hospitals throughout Gaza in the past 24 hours, increasing its count of the Palestinian death toll in Gaza to 55,637.
- The IDF said that it opened fire and "neutralized" a Palestinian man who tried to stab soldiers and snatch a gun in al-Walaja.
- Wafa reported that an Israeli strike hit a house in Maghazi refugee camp, killing 10 people including a woman and her children.
- Wafa reported that an Israeli strike hit a tent in al-Attar area of Khan Yunis, killing five people including a woman and two children and injured others.
- The IDF said that it launched an airstrike on three militants approaching its forces in Jabalia, targeted a building used by Hamas in the area, killed two “suspects who posed a threat”, directed a strike on Hamas tunnel infrastructure in central Gaza and destroyed a booby trapped building in Khan Yunis.
- IDF spokesperson Effie Defrin said the IAF struck more than 75 targets in Gaza in last day. He also said that “in the Gaza Strip, we are fighting according to a structured plan with four divisions".
- The IDF said that a soldier from the 603rd Combat Engineering Battalion was killed during combat in south Gaza, increasing the IDF death toll in Gaza to 433. Per an initial IDF investigation the soldier was killed by sniper fire in Khan Yunis.
- The IDF said that a rocket launched from Gaza fell in an open area in the vicinity of Nirim.
- The IDF said that a reservist from the 8105th Battalion of the 646th Reserve Paratroopers Brigade was critically injured in south Gaza.
- The IDF said that it killed a Hezbollah commander in a drone strike in Barish and accused him of trying to restore Hezbollah artillery.

=== 19 June ===
- The Gaza Health Ministry reported that at least 69 bodies of people killed in Israeli attacks arrived at hospitals throughout Gaza in the past 24 hours, increasing its count of the Palestinian death toll in Gaza to 55,706.
- The IDF said that it demolished the house of a militant who conducted a shooting at Gitti Avissar intersection on 29 November 2024.
- The IDF said that it killed the commander of Hezbollah's anti-tank unit in Shebaa in a drone strike in south Lebanon and accused him of violating the ceasefire.
- Lebanese media reported that an Israeli drone attack hit a car near Houla, killing one person. The IDF said that it killed a Hezbollah militant involved in efforts to restore Hezbollah infrastructure in the area.
- AFP reported that Israeli fire killed at least 15 people in the Netzarim Corridor. The IDF said that it fired "warning shots" towards "suspects" approaching it, however that it was "not aware of any injured individuals". Al Jazeera updated the casualties to 22.
- Medics said that an Israeli strike hit a tent in Al-Shati refugee camp, killing 19 people including children and women.
- Medics said that an Israeli strike hit Jabalia, killing 14 people.

=== 20 June ===
- Al Jazeera reported that an Israeli strike hit a house in al-Ma'askar area of Deir el-Balah, killing at least 12 people and injuring others.
- NNA reported that an Israeli drone targeted a car in the town of Al-Aabbassiyah in the Tyre District of Lebanon, killing one person.
- The IDF said that a rocket launched from Gaza hit an open area in the vicinity of Be'eri.
- The IDF said that it killed a senior Mujahideen Brigades commander in a strike in central Gaza in this week. It also said it struck approximately 300 militant targets in Gaza, including militants, buildings used by militant groups, weapon depots, and missile and sniper posts in the last week.
- The IDF said that it killed the commander of Hezbollah's firepower unit in the Litani river area, in a drone strike in Shabriha in the vicinity of Tyre and accused him of violating the ceasefire.
- The IDF said that it killed al-Qassam Brigades finance chief who was a former aide to former Brigade deputy chief Marwan Issa in an airstrike in central Gaza in this week.
- The IDF said that the IAF struck Hezbollah targets including rocket launchers and weapons caches in south Lebanon and accused the group of violating ceasefire.
- Gaza Health Ministry said that Israeli fire killed at least 25 people south of the Netzarim Corridor. The IDF said that it fired warning shots towards suspected militants who approached it. It also said that an Israeli aircraft then struck and killed the suspects. It added that it was aware of others being hurt in the incident.
- Al Jazeera reported that Israeli forces carried out operations in the towns of 'Arura and Abwein, as well as the Nubani farms in Ramallah. The Palestinian Information Center reported that Israeli forces turned some of the houses owned by Palestinians into military barracks.

=== 21 June ===
- The Gaza Health Ministry reported that at least 202 bodies of people killed in Israeli attacks arrived at hospitals throughout Gaza in the past 48 hours, increasing its count of the Palestinian death toll in Gaza to 55,908.
- NNA reported that an Israeli drone attack hit a motorcycle in Baraachit, killing one person. The IDF said that it killed a Hezbollah militant.
- The IDF said that its naval vessel targeted a facility belonging to the Radwan Force in Naqoura after gathering intelligence including from the interrogation of an arrested Hezbollah militant.
- Israeli settlers with protection from the IDF attacked the village of Deir Jarir, east of Ramallah, local residents confronted the settlers which prompted the soldiers to fire live round and stun grenades without any casualties reported.

=== 22 June ===
- The Gaza Health Ministry reported that at least 51 people were killed in Israeli attacks throughout Gaza in the past 24 hours, increasing its count of the Palestinian death toll in Gaza to 55,959.
- The remains of hostages Ofra Keidar, Yonatan Samerano, and Shay Levinson were recovered by Israel from Gaza.
- The IDF announced that it, Israel Border Police and Shin Bet expanded operations in the West Bank over the weekend.
- The New Arab reported that an Israeli strike hit a house in Nuseirat refugee camp, killing a Gaza Civil Defence member.

=== 23 June ===
- The Gaza Health Ministry reported that at least 39 bodies of people killed in Israeli attacks arrived at hospitals throughout Gaza in the past 24 hours, increasing its count of the Palestinian death toll in Gaza to 55,998.
- Wafa reported that an Israeli strike in Gaza City killed three people including a child.
- NNA reported that Israeli air strikes hit the outskirts of several areas in southern Lebanon including Zrariyeh, Kfrar Milki and Ansar.
- The IDF said that it destroyed 2.5 kilometers of Hamas tunnels while operating in Kafr Jabalia, north Gaza.
- The IDF said that it conducted strikes targeting Hezbollah military sites including rocket launchers and weapon depots north of the Litani River and accused the group of violating the ceasefire.
- A 13-year-old Palestinian teenager died from injuries sustained from shots fired by Israeli forces in Kafr Malik.

=== 24 June ===
- The Gaza Health Ministry reported that at least 79 bodies of people killed in Israeli attacks arrived at hospitals throughout Gaza in the past 24 hours, increasing its count of the Palestinian death toll in Gaza to 56,077.
- Lebanese media reported that an Israeli drone attack hit a car in the vicinity of Kfardajal, killing three people.
- Medics said that an Israeli strike in Sabra, Gaza killed 10 people.
- Medics said that Israeli gunfire in Khan Yunis killed 11 people.
- The IDF dropped leaflets over several parts of northern Gaza ordering residents to move south.
- al-Quds Brigades claimed that it inflicted casualties by shelling a gathering of Israeli forces in south Khan Yunis.
- al-Qassam Brigades claimed that it inflicted casualties by launching rocket-propelled grenades and opening fire at Israeli forces sheltering in a home in south Khan Yunis.

=== 25 June ===
- The Gaza Health Ministry reported that at least 74 people were killed in Israeli attacks throughout Gaza in the past 24 hours and bodies of five people killed in earlier attacks were recovered, increasing its count of the Palestinian death toll in Gaza to 56,156.
- Seven Israeli soldiers from the 605th Combat Engineering Battalion were killed during combat in south Gaza, increasing the IDF death toll in Gaza to 440. Per an initial IDF investigation, a militant planted an explosive device on a Puma armored combat engineering vehicle the soldiers were in while they were driving in Khan Yunis. Two soldiers were injured, one critically and one slightly by RPG fire in a separate incident in Khan Yunis.
- Palestinian media reported that shots fired by Israel Border Police killed an elderly woman during a raid in Shu'fat Camp.
- The IDF said that it downed a drone apparently fired from Yemen prior to entering Israeli airspace.
- Lebanese media reported that an Israeli drone attack targeted the vicinity of Al-Mansouri, injuring at least one person.
- The IDF said that it and Shin Bet detained 20 suspected militants during overnight operations in the West Bank. It also said that materials used for producing explosives, weapons, and tens of thousands of shekels were found and seized during the operation. It added that it arrested a weapons dealer from Jenin.
- Gaza health officials said that 33 people reportedly died while attempting to access food. The IDF said that it fired warning shots towards people it said approached its forces in a suspicious manner.

=== 26 June ===
- The Netanyahu government halted aid from entering north Gaza, saying that Hamas is taking control of humanitarian aid entering north Gaza. Gaza clans denied that Hamas is stealing it.
- NNA reported that an Israeli drone strike on a motorcycle in Beit Lif killed two people. It also reported that several people were injured in a drone strike in Bint Jbeil. The IDF said that the it killed a Radwan Force commander and a militant from Hezbollah's observation unit in two strikes in south Lebanon.
- The IDF said that it destroyed a house in Houla and accused Hezbollah of using it to observe its forces.
- An Israeli attack hit a street in Deir al-Balah where witnesses said a crowd of people was receiving bags of flour from a Palestinian police unit which had seized the goods from gangs seizing aid convoys, killing 18 people including at least seven members of the Sahmt unit of the Gaza Interior Ministry responsible for combating looters and merchants fencing stolen aid and a child.
- The IDF said that a missile fired by the Houthis towards Israel was believed to have crashed before entering the country.

=== 27 June ===
- The Gaza Health Ministry reported that at least 72 bodies of people killed in Israeli attacks arrived at hospitals throughout Gaza in the past 24 hours, increasing its count of the Palestinian death toll in Gaza to 56,331.
- Al Jazeera reported that an Israeli strike hit a tent in al-Mawasi, killing two people including a doctor.
- Al Jazeera reported that land was levelled and olive trees were demolished by settlers on the outskirts of Aqraba, Nablus.
- The IDF said that it destroyed a Hamas tunnel measuring one kilometer in Beit Hanoun used in a deadly attack against its forces during the 2014 Gaza War. It also said that it destroyed dozens of militant infrastructures and killed militants in the area.
- Al Jazeera reported that a Palestinian woman was assaulted in an attack by settlers on houses in Masafer Yatta that injured other residents.
- The IDF said that it struck a Hezbollah infrastructure in Beaufort Castle area and accused the group of violating the ceasefire.
- al-Quds Brigades claimed that it shelled a group of Israeli force and vehicles near entrance of Hamad City in an attack conducted in conjunction with al-Qassam Brigades.
- Lebanese media reported that an Israeli drone strike hit an apartment in Nabatieh. The Lebanese Health Ministry said that a woman was killed while 13 others were injured. Officials also said that seven others were injured in Nabatieh's outskirts. The IDF blamed the explosion on a rocket that was launched during strikes on a nearby Hezbollah infrastructure and released a video that it says confirmed it.
- Al Jazeera reported that an Israeli strike hit a group of people in Tuffah, killing 10 people including a journalist.
- Al Jazeera reported that an Israeli strike hit a school sheltering displaced people in as-Saftawi area, north of Gaza City, killing eight people including a woman and three children.
- al-Quds Brigades claimed that it shelled a group of Israeli soldiers and vehicles near the Halima Mosque in Jorat al-Lut, south of Khan Yunis in an attack conducted alongside al-Qassam Brigades.
- Palestinian media reported that farmers were expelled by armed Israeli settlers from their fields in Shuqba.
- The IDF said that it downed a rocket fired from central Gaza. It later issued evacuation order for several areas in northern Gaza, including the towns of Nuseirat, Zahraa, Mughraqa, al-Nuzha, al-Bawadi, al-Basma, al-Zahraa, al-Basatin, Badr, Abu Hureira, al-Rawda, and al-Safa. to move southward to al-Mawasi, saying that militant organisations fired rockets from these areas.
- al-Quds Brigades claimed that it targeted Israeli forces using rockets east of the Netzarim Corridor.
- Al Jazeera reported that an Israeli attack in Shaqra wounded four people.

=== 28 June ===
- The Gaza Health Ministry reported that at least 81 bodies of people killed in Israeli attacks arrived at hospitals throughout Gaza in the past 24 hours, increasing its count of the Palestinian death toll in Gaza to 56,412.
- The IDF said that it likely downed a missile fired by the Houthis from Yemen towards Israel.
- Al Jazeera reported that over 25 people including a journalist were detained by Israeli forces from the West Bank.
- al-Quds Brigades claimed that it detonated an explosive device on an Israeli vehicle in south Gaza.
- al-Quds Brigades claimed that it shelled a group of Israeli soldiers and vehicles in Gaza City.
- Al Jazeera reported that an Israeli strike in Tuffah killed 20 people including at least nine children.
- Health workers said that an Israeli strike hit a tent camp in al-Mawasi, killing three children and their parents.
- The IDF said that it killed a Hezbollah anti-tank commander in a strike in Kounin.
- Al-Ahli Hospital reported that an Israeli strike hit a gathering in eastern Gaza City, killing eight people including five children.
- The Lebanese Health Ministry said that an Israeli strike hit a motorcycle in Mahrouna, killing two people including a woman and injuring three others. The IDF said that it killed a Radwan Force intelligence operative involved in transferring weapons and accused him of violating the ceasefire.
- Al Jazeera reported that agricultural land was set to fire by settlers in a village east of Ramallah. Houses were also reportedly attacked by settlers under the protection of Israeli forces in Tell, Nablus.
- The IDF and Shin Bet said they killed a founding Hamas leader who participated in planning the 7 October attacks in a strike in Sabra, Gaza.
- Al Jazeera reported that Israeli drone fire on a tent west of Khan Yunis killed four people including two women and a child.

=== 29 June ===
- The Gaza Health Ministry reported that at least 88 bodies of people killed in Israeli attacks arrived at hospitals throughout Gaza in the past 24 hours, increasing its count of the Palestinian death toll in Gaza to 56,500.
- The IDF ordered to evacuate Jabalia and Gaza City.
- Al Jazeera reported that an Israeli strike hit a tent al-Mawasi, west of Khan Yunis, killing five people including a child and two women.
- Al Jazeera reported that an Israeli strike hit a home in Zaytun Quarter, killing two children and injuring more than 20 others.
- Al Jazeera reported that booby-trapped explosives were used to destroy entire residential neighbourhoods in Khan Yunis, as the IDF said that it is focusing operations in defeating Hamas battalions in the area.
- Al Jazeera reported that an Israeli strike in Daraj Quarter injured a woman.
- al-Qassam Brigades claimed that it targeted an Israeli bulldozer with an Al-Yassin 105 missile in Bani Suheila.
- An Israeli strike hit a house in Sabra, Gaza, killing four people including a child.
- Shin Bet said that it arrested more than 60 Hamas militants in the largest anti-militancy operation in the West Bank in a decade.
- The IDF said that a soldier from the 601st Combat Engineering Battalion was killed during combat in north Gaza. Per an initial IDF investigation, the soldier was killed by an explosive device in Kafr Jabalia, increasing the IDF death toll in Gaza to 441.
- al-Quds Brigades claimed that it destroyed an Israeli vehicle with a barrel bomb in Abasan al-Kabira. It also claimed that it in conjunction with the al-Qassam Brigades shelled Israeli forces and vehicles in multiple areas in south Khan Yunis.
- Gaza Civil Defence said that it treated two injured people and recovered the body of a woman killed in al-Shaer, Khan Yunis.
- Al Jazeera reported that a group of Israeli settlers opened fire at residents on the main street of Hizma, injuring three people including a boy. They also set fire to property of a resident under the protection of Israeli forces.
- An Israeli drone attack was reported in north Lebanon.
- An Israeli strike hit a home in Jabaliya al-Nazla, killing at least 15 people including children and women.

=== 30 June ===
- The Gaza Health Ministry reported that death toll from Israeli attacks since the beginning of the war increased to 56,531.
- An Israeli strike hit the Israeli-designated safe zone of al-Mawasi, killing one person and injuring others.
- An Israeli strike hit a beachfront cafe in Gaza City, killing at least 39 people including children, women and a local journalist.
- A 22-year-old detainee from Jenin being held under administrative detention in an Israeli jail died.
- The IDF said that it hit militant targets in north Gaza, including command and control centers.
- The IDF said that it thwarted militant attacks in West Bank and uncovered an explosive lab in Ramallah.
- al-Quds Brigades claimed that it attacked Israeli forces in Khan Yunis.
- The IDF admitted that civilians were harmed at aid distribution sites in Gaza, saying that new instructions were issued to its forces following "lessons learned".
- The Trump administration approved a $510-million weapons sale to Israel including over 7,000 bomb guidance kits.
- A 29-year-old man died from malnutrition due to Israel's blockade, according to the Kuwait Specialised Field Hospital in Rafah.

== July ==
=== 1 July ===
- The Gaza Health Ministry reported that at least 116 bodies of people killed in Israeli attacks arrived at hospitals throughout Gaza in the past 24 hours, increasing its count of the Palestinian death toll in Gaza to 56,647.
- The Lebanese Health Ministry said that an Israeli drone strike hit a home on the road leading to Jabal al-Ahmar in Nabatieh District, slightly injuring two people including a child.
- The IDF said that in the past day it struck over 140 militant targets throughout Gaza, targeting militants, anti-tank launch sites, weapons depots, military buildings, and underground infrastructure threatening Israeli forces. It also said that it killed two militants who tried to plant an explosive device and eight militants in an operational command center. The 36th Division reported that dozens of militants were killed and hundreds of targets were destroyed in recent days and its naval forces struck several targets in south Gaza under the direction of the 143rd Division.
- Al Jazeera reported that an Israeli strike hit a house in Khan Yunis, killing 10 people.
- The IDF said that it destroyed almost three kilometers of interconnected tunnels used by militants in Khan Yunis and killed dozens of militants in close-quarters fighting, that also included IAF strikes. It also said that it destroyed hundreds of above and under-ground militant sites, including tunnel shafts, command centers, and fortified hideouts designed for long-term use.
- al-Quds Brigades claimed that it launched mortar shells towards Israeli forces and vehicles north of Khan Yunis.
- Wafa reported that large areas of agricultural land were set on fire by Israeli settlers in Duma, Nablus.
- The IDF said that it started a new ground offensive in Gaza City. It also said that its forces are operating in Gaza City's eastern areas, targeting underground infrastructure and killing militants. It added that it struck almost 100 militant targets including weapons depots, command centers and observation posts.
- Shots fired by Israeli forces killed two people including a 15-year-old boy in the West Bank. The IDF said that it fired warning shots into the air after several suspects threw rocks towards Israeli forces in Ramallah. It also said that it shot a suspect trying to cross the West Bank barrier in the vicinity of al-Ramadin.
- Al Jazeera reported that Israeli strikes in Gaza City killed 70 people including 14 women and 12 children and injured over 200 others, some of them seriously.
- The IDF said that it downed two rockets launched from Gaza towards south Israel. It later ordered to evacuate some areas of Khan Yunis, saying that it is operating with extreme force to destroy militant groups in the area and will attack any area used to fire rockets.
- The IDF said that the IAF downed a missile launched towards Israel from Yemen. The Houthis said that they conducted four operations targeting an airport and other "sensitive" Israeli targets.

=== 2 July ===
- The Gaza Health Ministry reported that at least 142 bodies of people killed in Israeli attacks arrived at hospitals throughout Gaza in the past 24 hours, increasing its count of the Palestinian death toll in Gaza to 57,012.
- Al Jazeera reported that an Israeli strike hit tents in the Israeli-designated humanitarian zone of al-Mawasi, killing at least six people and injuring 10 others, mostly children.
- Al Jazeera reported that an Israeli strike hit a home in Tuffah, killing four people including two children.
- Al Jazeera reported that fourteen people including two 15-year-olds were detained by Israeli forces from Bethlehem Governorate.
- Al Jazeera reported that an Israeli strike hit a gathering in Deir el-Balah including two young girls.
- Gaza media outlets reported that an Israeli strike hit a residential building southwest of Gaza City, killing the director of the Indonesian Hospital, his wife and children.
- al-Quds Brigades said that it in cooperation with al-Qassam Brigades launched mortar shells targeting Israeli forces advancing into Khan Yunis.
- Al Jazeera reported that a house in Ni'lin was demolished by Israeli bulldozers, citing lack of building permits issued by Israeli authorities.
- Al Jazeera reported that an Israeli strike hit a building in Zaytun Quarter, killing at least 17 people, mostly children and women.
- The IDF and Israel police said they detained four Palestinians suspected of throwing Molotov cocktails at a civilian road in the vicinity of Efrat.
- The IDF said that a soldier from the 82nd Battalion of the 7th Armored Brigade was killed during combat in north Gaza, increasing the IDF death toll in Gaza to 442, while a tank commander and another soldier from the same battalion were critically injured in the same incident. A soldier from the Egoz Unit was also critically injured in a separate incident in north Gaza.
- The IDF said that it downed two rockets launched from Gaza. It later ordered to evacuate some areas of central Gaza.
- The IDF and Shin Bet announced that the IAF killed two Hamas militants who were involved in killing seven soldiers.
- The IDF said that it targeted a key Hamas militant in Gaza City.

=== 3 July ===
- The Gaza Health Ministry reported that at least 118 people were killed in Israeli attacks throughout Gaza in the past 24 hours, increasing its count of the Palestinian death toll in Gaza to 57,130.
- Al Jazeera reported that an Israeli attack hit a tent in al-Mawasi, killing 13 people including four children and their parents.
- Local medics said that an Israeli strike hit a school sheltering displaced people west of Gaza City, killing at least 17 people. The IDF said that it targeted a Hamas militant.
- The IDF said that it killed a militant cell in north Gaza that fired rockets at Sderot and Ibim one day prior in a drone strike. It also said that its ground forces targeted militants and underground infrastructure during ground in the north Gaza and uncovered pistols, magazines, and mortars in Khan Yunis. It also said that the IAF struck almost 150 militant targets throughout Gaza including underground routes, militant structures, sniper positions, and other militant infrastructure.
- Hamas said that an Israeli strike killed three of its militants.
- NNA reported that one person was killed while three others were injured in an IDF drone strike in Khalde.
- al-Qassam Brigades claimed that it targeted an Israeli personnel carrier using a missile in Khan Yunis one day prior. al-Quds Brigades claimed that it destroyed a Merkava tank with two unexploded munitions left behind by Israeli forces in central Khan Yunis.
- The IDF said it conducted strikes on Hezbollah targets and accused the group of violating the ceasefire.
- The IDF said that it arrested 10 wanted people and seized firearms during overnight operations throughout the West Bank.
- The IDF said that a missile launched from Yemen fell on its way to Israel.

=== 4 July ===
- The Gaza Health Ministry reported that at least 138 people were killed in Israeli attacks throughout Gaza in the past 24 hours, increasing its count of the Palestinian death toll in Gaza to 57,268.
- Agence France Presse reported that an Israeli strike hit tents in the vicinity of Khan Yunis, killing seven people including a child.
- Agence France Presse reported that Israeli strikes hit tent encampments on the Khan Yunis coast, killing eight people including two children.
- The IDF announced that a Combat Engineering soldier in the Northern Brigade was killed in a combat-related operational accident in north Gaza.
- The IDF said that the IAF struck 100 militant targets included rocket launchers, buildings used by militants, weapons depots and other infrastructure used by militants throughout Gaza in last 24 hours as its ground troops continue operations against Hamas and other militant groups. It also said that its ground forces from multiple divisions simultaneously continued operations in Gaza City, north Gaza, Khan Yunis and Rafah, and destroyed tunnels, weapons caches and explosives.
- The IDF said a soldier from the 53rd Armored Battalion of the 188th Brigade was killed during combat in Khan Yunis. A tank was hit by an improvised explosive device in the same incident, resulting in four soldiers injured including a company commander, two of them critically. Per the IDF, the IAF later struck and killed part of militant cell responsible for the attack.
- The IDF issued evacuation orders for some neighborhoods of Khan Yunis.
- al-Qassam Brigades claimed that it hit an Israeli Merkava tank using a Yassin 105 missile east of Tuffah and shelled an Israeli command centre in the same area.
- The IDF said that it gained control over almost 65% of territory in Gaza and killed more than 100 Hamas militants during the last week. It also said that the IAF struck more than 7,500 militant targets including weapons sites, tunnels and rocket launchers since the beginning of the war.
- Al Jazeera reported that an Israeli settler attack in Sinjil wounded three people.
- Al Jazeera reported that Israeli settlers protected by Israeli soldiers fired bullets and tear gas canisters in Beita and Osarin, and damaged an ambulance.

=== 5 July ===
- The Gaza Health Ministry reported that at least 70 bodies of people killed in Israeli attacks arrived at hospitals throughout Gaza in the past 24 hours, increasing its count of the Palestinian death toll in Gaza to 57,338.
- An Israeli strike hit a home in Shebaa, injuring one person.
- Lebanese state media reported that an Israeli strike hit a vehicle on a road leading to Bint Jbeil, killing one person and injuring two others.
- Lebanon's Health Ministry said that an Israeli strike hit a car in Bint Jbeil, injuring one person.
- AFP reported that an Israeli strike hit in the vicinity of a school sheltering displaced people in Gaza City, killing three people and injuring almost 10 people including children.
- al-Qassam Brigades claimed that it inflicted casualties on Israeli forces in the vicinity of the Education Directorate in central Khan Yunis by targeting two Merkava tanks with explosive devices and an armoured personnel carrier using an Al-Yassin 105 anti-armour rocket.
- Al Jazeera reported that an Israeli strike hit a tent in the Israeli-designated humanitarian zone of al-Mawasi, killing a doctor and several of his relatives including three children.
- An Israeli strike hit a vehicle in Shaqra, injuring two people.
- The IDF said that it killed a Radwan Force militant in Aynata.
- al-Qassam Brigades claimed that it targeted an Israeli infantry force using an RPG a week prior and targeted three Israeli Merkava tanks using two Shawaza bombs and a tandem missile east of Jabalia on 30 June.
- The IDF, Shin Bet and Israel police said that they arrested three wanted members of an Arab militant cell in Barta'a who plotted an imminent attack.
- al-Quds Brigades published footage claiming to show it targeting an Israeli tank in south Gaza. It also claimed that it captured several small Israeli drones.
- The IDF said that it downed two rockets launched from south Gaza.
- Al Jazeera reported that Israeli settlers tried to set fire to a house in Jiljilyya and attacked an area south of Sinjil. A young man was wounded by rubber bullets during a settler attack on Beita.
- al-Qassam Brigades released footage of it claiming to blow up an Israeli tank in south Gaza one day prior. It also claimed that it fired at Israeli forces in an armoured vehicle.
- The IDF said that it downed a missile fired from Yemen towards Israel.

=== 6 July ===
- The Gaza Health Ministry reported that at least 80 bodies of people killed in Israeli attacks arrived at hospitals throughout Gaza in the past 24 hours, increasing its count of the Palestinian death toll in Gaza to 57,418.
- An Israeli strike hit a home in Sheikh Radwan, killing at least 12 people, injuring several others and trapping several others under the rubble.
- Al Jazeera reported that Israeli strikes hit tents in al-Mawasi, killing three people including children.
- Al Jazeera reported that a 16-year-old boy was detained by Israeli forces from Beit Furik.
- The Israeli security cabinet decided to allow more aid distribution in north Gaza.
- Israeli-backed Popular Forces head Yasser Abu Shabab acknowledged cooperating with Israeli forces in Gaza.
- Al Jazeera reported that Israeli strikes hit two houses in western Gaza City, killing at least 20 people including children and women.
- Al Jazeera reported that three people including a 16 year old teenager were detained by Israeli forces from al-Mazraa al-Gharbiya, northwest of Ramallah.
- The IDF said that it struck more than 130 militant targets in the last 24 hours, including command centers, weapons depots, rocket launchers, and militant cells. It also said that it raided Hamas positions, finding and capturing combat equipment in Khan Yunis. It added that it uncovered tunnel shafts and destroyed militant infrastructure in Jenina neighborhood of Rafah, killed militants in Gaza City, struck militant compounds and destroyed surveillance equipment and additional infrastructure, destroyed surface and subterranean militant assets, including an explosives warehouse and struck several other militant structures and killed militants in Jabalia and the outskirts of Daraj Quarter and Tuffah.
- Al Jazeera reported that an Israeli strike hit a tent west of Khan Yunis, killing four people including three children.
- Al Jazeera reported that an agricultural facility was damaged by Israeli settlers in Kafr ad-Dik.
- Al Jazeera reported that an Israeli strike hit a school sheltering displaced people in Al-Shati refugee camp, killing six people including children and injuring many others.
- Al Jazeera reported that an Israeli strike in Tuffah killed members of a family including children.
- The IDF said that it killed Hamas's naval force commander in north Gaza in Gaza City. It also said that it killed other Hamas commanders including the deputy head of its mortar shell array.
- The IDF issued evacuation orders for several neighborhoods of Khan Yunis.
- The IDF said that one rocket fired from south Gaza fell in an open area in the vicinity of Nirim. It caused minor damage to several buildings in Eshkol Regional Council.
- Israeli strikes hit multiple areas throughout Lebanon. The IDF said that it conducted strikes against Hezbollah targets and accused the group of violating the ceasefire. At least 10 people were injured including a child.
- The IDF issued evacuation order for Ras Isa port, Hudaydah Port and Port of Salif. It also issued evacuation order for Ras Al-Katheeb power station in Hodeidah. It later said that it struck infrastructure used by Houthis for militant activity. The Houthis claimed that their air defences forced “a large portion” of Israeli warplanes to retreat.
- The Houthis attacked and claimed to have sunk the cargo vessel Magic Seas in the Red Sea.

=== 7 July ===
- The Gaza Health Ministry reported that at least 105 bodies of people killed in Israeli attacks arrived at hospitals throughout Gaza in the past 24 hours, increasing its count of the Palestinian death toll in Gaza to 57,523.
- The IDF said that two missiles were launched from Yemen towards Jerusalem.
- Al Jazeera reported that an Israeli strike hit a clinic in Rimal neighborhood of Gaza City, killing six people including women and children and injuring 15 others.
- Al Jazeera reported that an Israeli strike in Bureij killed three people and reportedly injuring children.
- The IDF said that the IAF struck dozens of targets in the Gaza in last day including dozens of militants, weapon depots, observation posts, and other buildings used by militant groups. It also said that it killed numerous militants and destroyed Hamas militant infrastructure, including tunnels, buildings used for militant activities, anti-tank launch posts, and observation posts during ground operations.
- al-Quds Brigades claimed that it blew up two Israeli vehicles using anti-tank explosives east of Shuja'iyya.
- The IDF said that it killed two militants in Salem.
- Israeli Defence Minister Israel Katz said that he ordered the ministry and the IDF to prepare a plan to establish a new “humanitarian city” on the ruins of Rafah. Plans included establishing more aid distribution at the zone, as well as relocating the entire population of Gaza to the zone, which they would not be permitted to leave.
- The IDF said that it shot down a drone fired from Yemen towards Israel.
- The IDF said that a ballistic missile fired towards Israel by the Houthis fell short outside Israel.
- Al Jazeera reported that an Israeli strike hit a tent in the Israeli-designated humanitarian zone of al-Mawasi, killing four people and injuring others.
- NNA reported that an Israeli strike hit a motorcycle in Bint Jbeil District, killing one person.
- Lebanese Health Ministry said that an Israeli attack killed another person.
- The Houthis attacked and sunk the cargo vessel Eternity C in the Red Sea. The Houthis said that they had rescued and treated some of the ship's crew. At least 4 people are presumed dead in the attack and 11 others went missing.
- al-Qassam Brigades and al-Quds Brigades said that they bombed and shelled three Israeli Merkava tanks in Shuja'iyya.

=== 8 July ===
- The Gaza Health Ministry reported that at least 49 people killed in Israeli attacks in the past 24 hours, increasing its count of the Palestinian death toll in Gaza to 57,575.
- The IDF announced that five soldiers from the Kfir Brigade were killed and 14 others were injured by three explosives remotely detonated during an operation in Beit Hanoun.
- Al Jazeera reported that an Israeli strike hit a home in Tel al-Hawa, killing four people including an infant.
- Al Jazeera reported that an Israeli strike hit makeshift tents in the Israeli designated safe zone in Khan Yunis, killing five people including two in the vicinity of Nasser Hospital.
- Al Jazeera reported that an Israeli strike hit a school sheltering displaced people in Bureij, killing at least four people.
- al-Quds Brigades claimed that it targeted Israeli forces sheltering inside a home in central Khan Yunis using a guided missile one day prior.
- The IDF announced that it killed two Hezbollah militants including a Radwan Force commander in its strikes in south Lebanon one day prior.
- The IDF ordered to evacuate nine neighborhoods in Khan Yunis, saying that those areas were used for militant activities.
- Al Jazeera reported that an Israeli strikes hit central and south Gaza, killing six al-Qassam Brigades militants.
- Al Jazeera reported that an Israeli strike hit tents in Khan Yunis, killing at least 10 people.
- al-Qassam Brigades claimed that it targeted an Israeli D9 military bulldozer using an Al-Yassin 105 missile in the vicinity of Islah Mosque on al-Muntar Street, east of Shuja'iyya.
- The IDF announced that it killed a Nukhba forces commander who participated in the 7 October attacks.
- Al Jazeera reported that farmland was vandalised by Israeli settlers protected by Israeli forces in Masafer Yatta.
- Al Jazeera reported that an Israeli strike hit the Israeli-designated humanitarian zone of al-Mawasi, killing seven people.
- An Israeli strike hit Gaza City, causing casualties including children.
- Al Jazeera reported that an Israeli strike hit a vehicle in Babliyah.
- Al Jazeera reported that two people were wounded while agricultural land was set on fire by Israeli settlers in Surif.
- Lebanon's health ministry said that an Israeli strike hit a car near Tripoli, killing three people. The IDF said it had killed Mehran Mustafa Ba'jur, a local Hamas commander.
- Al Jazeera reported that an Israeli strike in Al-Shati refugee camp killed at least 10 people including children and injuring 30 others.

=== 9 July ===
- The IDF announced that it killed Hezbollah's Badr Unit fire coordination head in the Zahrani sector in a strike in Babliyeh and accused him of violating the ceasefire.
- Gaza hospitals reported that Israeli strikes in Gaza killed at least 40 people including 10 children and 17 women.
- The IDF said that it struck over 100 Hamas targets across Gaza, claiming that it destroyed an explosives and mines cache hidden in civilian infrastructure. It also said that it killed a militant cell, destroyed militant structures and struck a Hamas weapons facility while operating in Shuja'iyya and Zaytun Quarter in recent days. It added that it killed another cell and destroyed militant infrastructure in al-Jnaina area of Rafah city.
- Al Jazeera reported that more than 30 people including two children were detained by Israeli forces from the West Bank.
- The IDF said that it and Israeli police arrested two suspects following a brigade-level operation in Surif in response to an incident of rock-throwing and arson attacks on vehicles in the vicinity of Bat Ayin.
- The IDF said that it raided and destroyed several Hezbollah infrastructure in southern Lebanon.
- The IDF said that it expanded its ground offensive in Beit Hanoun to destroy militant infrastructure, kill militants and destroy Hamas capabilities.
- The Trump administration imposed sanctions against UN Special Rapporteur Francesca Albanese.
- The IDF announced that a soldier who was a heavy engineering operator in the combat engineering unit of the Southern Command was killed during an abduction attempt by Hamas militants in south Gaza.

=== 10 July ===
- Gaza health authorities said that an Israeli strike in the vicinity of a medical centre in Deir el-Balah killed 14 people including 9 children and three women and wounded others. The IDF said that it targeted a Hamas militant who participated in 7 October attacks.
- The IDF said that a soldier from the 77th Battalion of the 7th Armored Brigade was critically injured during combat in north Gaza.
- The IDF said that it downed a missile launched towards Israel by Houthis.
- Al Jazeera reported that an Israeli strike hit a house in Zaytun Quarter, killing at least four people including a child.
- The IDF said that a soldier was stabbed and moderately wounded while operating in Rummanah in the vicinity of Jenin. It also said that it shot and killed the attacker.
- The IDF said that its Golani Brigade killed dozens of militants and demolished more than 130 militant infrastructures in Khan Yunis in the past week including a Hamas tunnel measuring 500 meters, weapons caches, booby-trapped buildings, observation posts, and mortar launching positions.
- The IDF said that it destroyed buildings used by militants in the West Bank to shoot at Israeli communities in the Hefer Valley.
- More than 50 people including children were detained by Israeli forces from West Bank.
- The IDF said that the IAF struck more than 180 targets including militants, booby-trapped buildings, weapon depots, anti-tank launch posts, tunnels, and other infrastructure. It also said that it found several weapons and tunnel shafts used by Hamas in north Gaza and launched two drone strikes at buildings housing Hamas and PIJ militant cells.
- The IDF said that it struck a Hezbollah militant compound in Yohmor that "operated under the guise of a civilian structure".
- NNA reported that an Israeli strike hit a motorcycle in Al-Mansouri, killing one person and injuring another. The IDF said that it killed the Hezbollah artillery forces commander in south Lebanon's coastal sector and accused him of violating the ceasefire.
- An Israeli man died from injuries sustained in a stabbing and shooting at a shopping complex at Gush Etzion Junction. The IDF said that it and other Israeli security forces shot and killed two militants who conducted the attack.
- al-Quds Brigades said that it fired explosive shells at a “newly established command and control headquarters” belonging to Israeli forces north of Khan Yunis, and attacked Israeli special forces fortified inside a home in the city centre.
- The IDF said that a missile fired from Yemen fell prior to reaching Israel.
- Israeli strikes in Khan Yunis and al-Mawasi killed 21 people including three women and three children.
- The IDF announced that it killed a Hamas weapons production headquarters commander in Gaza in Nuseirat camp.

=== 11 July ===
- The IDF reported that an officer of the Golani Brigade was killed a day prior by an apparent accidental explosion in Khan Yunis while operating in buildings suspected to be used by Hamas for militant activity, increasing the IDF death toll in Gaza to 451.
- Al Jazeera reported that an Israeli strike hit a school sheltering displaced people in Jabalia an-Nazla, killing at least 10 people and injuring several others.
- The IDF said that it destroyed a Hamas tunnel measuring a kilometer in Khan Yunis.
- The IDF announced that it killed the PIJ's commander in Shuja'iyya who participated in the 7 October attacks in coordination with Shin Bet, and killed another PIJ militant responsible for engineering and explosives in the Turukman Battalion in a separate strike.
- The IDF announced that two soldiers were injured by anti-tank fire on a tank in Jabalia.
- The IDF warned to evacuate an area of Gaza City, saying that Hamas militant organization is using civilian areas for militant activities.
- NNA reported that an Israeli strike hit a car in Nabatieh District, killing one person and injuring two others. The IDF and Shin Bet announced that it killed a militant involved in arms smuggling into Israel for militant attacks.
- The IDF and Shin Bet announced that they killed six senior militants from Hamas naval commando forces. They also said several of them participated in the 7 October attacks.
- Al Jazeera reported that an Israeli strike in Tuffah killed a child.
- The IDF announced that a tank commander from the 82nd Battalion of the 7th Armored Brigade was critically injured during combat in north Gaza.
- al-Quds Brigades claimed that it shelled Israeli forces in the western line area, north of Khan Yunis, and around Halima Mosque, south of Khan Yunis.
- Two people, including a Palestinian-American named Sayfollah Musaet, were killed in an Israeli settler attack in Khirbet al-Tal. The IDF said that the incident started after Palestinians threw rocks at Israelis in the vicinity of Sinjil, slightly injuring two civilians, while Palestinian accounts blamed settlers for the clash when Palestinians attempted to protest the establishment of a new illegal outpost.

=== 12 July ===
- The IDF said that it struck almost 250 targets in Gaza in last 48 hours including militants, booby-trapped structures, weapons depots, anti-tank missile launch posts, sniper posts, tunnels and other Hamas targets.
- The IDF announced that a soldier was moderately injured during combat in north Gaza, while three soldiers were wounded in a separate incident in south Gaza.
- Thirty-one people were killed in the vicinity of a Gaza Humanitarian Foundation facility in Rafah. The IDF said that it fired warning shots towards a group of people it believed were “posing a threat to the troops", but is not aware of casualties.
- The IDF said that it killed a militant from Hezbollah's anti-tank unit in Khiam.
- Nasser Hospital said that Israeli strikes in Deir al-Balah killed at least 13 people including two women and four children.
- Al-Aqsa Martyrs Hospital said that Israeli strikes in Khan Yunis killed 15 people.
- The IDF said that the IAF targeted almost 35 Hamas sites in Beit Hanoun in one hour, including tunnels.

=== 13 July ===
- The Gaza Health Ministry reported that at least 139 people killed in Israeli attacks in the past 24 hours, increasing its count of the Palestinian death toll in Gaza to 58,026.
- An Israeli strike hit a group of people when they went to collect water in central Gaza, killing at least 10 people including six children and injuring 17 others. The IDF said that the strike was a "technical malfunction" while targeting a PIJ militant.
- The IDF said it destroyed a tunnel used by militants in north Gaza that contained a weapons cache.
- Palestinian media outlets reported that an Israeli strike hit a market in central Gaza city, killing at least 12 people.
- The IDF said it struck over 150 targets in last 24 hours, including weapons depots, missile launchers and sniping posts.
- A stray bullet fired by Israeli forces from Gaza hit a soldier's car in Sha’ar Hanegev Junction, lightly injuring the soldier and causing minor damage to the car.
- The IDF and Shin Bet announced that they killed numerous militants involved in Hamas and PIJ efforts to regroup in a wave of strikes in Gaza in the last two weeks.
- An Israeli strike hit a house in Az-Zawayda, killing nine people including three children and two women.

=== 14 July ===
- The Gaza Health Ministry reported that at least 120 people killed in Israeli attacks in the past 24 hours, increasing its count of the Palestinian death toll in Gaza to 58,386.
- Al-Shifa Hospital's director said that Israeli strikes in north Gaza killed 12 people including two women and three children.
- The IDF and Shin Bet announced that 10 Hamas militants exiled to Gaza in the Gilad Shalit prisoner exchange were killed in a strike in Gaza in the last week.
- The IDF said that it killed a senior Hamas militant who participated in the 7 October attacks and held Israeli-British hostage Emily Damari in his house.
- The IDF said that it killed an armed militant who approached the Israeli outpost of Maoz Tzvi in the northern West Bank.
- The IDF announced that three soldiers from 52nd Battalion of the 401st Armored Brigade were killed and an officer was critically injured during combat in north Gaza, increasing the IDF death toll in Gaza to 454. Per an initial IDF investigation, the soldiers were in a tank that was hit by a blast in Jabalia. An IDF investigation later found that ammunition explosion inside the tank caused the casualties.
- The IDF said that it downed two rockets fired from central Gaza towards south Israel.

=== 15 July ===
- The Gaza Health Ministry reported that at least 93 bodies of people killed in Israeli attacks arrived at hospitals throughout Gaza in the past 24 hours, increasing its count of the Palestinian death toll in Gaza to 58,479.
- The IDF said that it shot and arrested a militant who attempted to ram soldiers in Jericho.
- The IDF ordered to evacuate Gaza City and Jabalia, saying that it is operating in the area with increased force to destroy militant organizations.
- The IDF said that it shot down a drone fired from Yemen. Houthis said that they fired three drones at south Israel.
- The IDF said that the IAF struck Redwan Force militant training camps in the Beqaa Valley, killing 12 people including seven Syrian nationals and five Hezbollah militants.
- The IDF said that it demolished several Hamas tunnels, including one measuring 3.5-kilometers, in Khan Yunis and Beit Hanoun.
- Lebanon banned transactions with the Hezbollah-affiliated Al-Qard Al-Hasan Association.
- Al-Shifa Hospital said that an Israeli strike hit a building in Shati refugee camp, killing a Hamas politician, and eight members of a single family sheltering in the same building.
- Al-Shifa Hospital said that an Israeli strike hit a home in Tel al-Hawa, killing 19 members of the same family including six children and eight women. Another strike on a tent in the same neighborhood killed five people including a woman and her two children.

=== 16 July ===
- The Gaza Health Ministry reported that at least 94 bodies of people killed in Israeli attacks arrived at hospitals throughout Gaza in the past 24 hours, increasing its count of the Palestinian death toll in Gaza to 58,573.
- The IDF said that it established a new corridor bisecting west and east Khan Yunis amid efforts to clear the area of militant infrastructure and militants.
- The IDF announced that a soldier from the 92 battalion of the Kfir Brigade was critically injured during combat in south Gaza.
- The IDF announced that it downed a ballistic missile launched from Yemen towards Israel.

=== 17 July ===
- The Gaza Health Ministry reported that at least 94 bodies of people killed in Israeli attacks arrived at hospitals throughout Gaza in the past 24 hours, increasing its count of the Palestinian death toll in Gaza to 58,667.
- The Latin Patriarch of Jerusalem said that an Israeli strike hit the Holy Family Church in Gaza, killing three people and injuring 10 others, including the priest. The IDF said that "fragments from a shell fired during operational activity in the area hit the church mistakenly."
- The IDF said that two soldiers from the 202nd Battalion of the Paratroopers Brigade were critically injured, and two officers were moderately and slightly wounded during combat in the north Gaza. Per an initial IDF investigation, the soldiers were shot by Hamas militants in Shuja'iyya.
- Lebanese media reported that an Israeli attack hit a vehicle between Kfour and Toul, killing one man and injuring two others. The IDF said that it killed a Radwan Force naval force commander and accused him of violating the ceasefire.
- Lebanese media reported that an Israeli attack hit a truck in Naqoura. The IDF said that it killed a Hezbollah militant involved in restoring the group's capabilities in the area and accused him of violating the ceasefire.
- The IDF said that it demolished houses of three militants in Qabatiya.
- The IDF said that the IAF struck more than 100 targets in Gaza, including militants, buildings used by militant groups, rocket-launching sites, weapons caches, tunnels, and other infrastructure. It also said that it killed several Hamas militants and destroyed militant infrastructure in Shuja'iyya, Daraj, Tuffah, Jabalia and Beit Hanoun.
- The IDF said that it intercepted two rockets fired from north Gaza towards Sderot.
- Slovenia said that it will ban Israeli far-right National Security Minister Itamar Ben Gvir and far-right Finance Minister Bezalel Smotrich from entering the country, accusing them of inciting "extreme violence and serious violations of the human rights of Palestinians" using "their genocidal statements".
- Local medics said that an Israeli strike in Jabalia killed seven people including a woman and her five children.
- Local medics said that an Israeli strike in north Gaza killed eight men responsible for protecting aid trucks.
- Israeli police said that a man wanted for militant activity was killed in Wadi al-Far'a when undercover police officers disguised as locals attempted to arrest him.

=== 18 July ===
- Al Jazeera reported that an Israeli strike hit tents in Israeli designated safe zone of al-Mawasi, killing at least five people including a child and three women.
- Al-Aqsa Martyrs hospital in Deir el-Balah reported that a one-year-old girl died from malnutrition in Deir el-Balah, increasing the count of the Gaza media office for children who died due to malnutrition in Gaza since the start of the war to 69.
- The IDF and Shin Bet announced that they killed three Hamas officials including one who assisted the al-Qassam Brigades in a strike in Gaza in this week and accused two of them of "employing methods of repression and violence against the civilians of the Gaza Strip” and "oppression of opponents to Hamas's rule".
- The IDF said that air defences downed one rocket fired from north Gaza towards southern Israel.
- The IDF and Shin Bet announced that it killed a prominent PIJ militant involved in transferring funds to advance militant attacks from the West Bank in a strike in Gaza earlier this week.
- Al Jazeera reported that dozens of sheep were stolen and killed by settlers in the north Jordan Valley.
- The IDF said Shin Bet announced that it killed Hamas' Daraj-Tuffah Battalion commander who participated in the 7 October attacks in a strike in the past week in the area of Daraj and Tuffah.
- Al Jazeera reported that an Israeli strike hit a house and a school sheltering displaced people in Gaza City, killing at least three people including a child.
- The IDF said that it downed a missile fired from Yemen.
- Al Jazeera reported that Israeli gunfire killed a 13-year-old teenager in Ya'bad.

=== 19 July ===
- The Gaza Health Ministry reported that at least 98 people were killed in Israeli attacks throughout Gaza in the past 48 hours, increasing its count of the Palestinian death toll in Gaza to 58,765.
- The Gaza Health Ministry and Nasser Hospital said that least 36 people were killed in the vicinity of Gaza Humanitarian Foundation food distribution sites. The IDF said that it fired “warning shots” in the vicinity of Rafah after a group of suspects approached its forces.
- The IDF said that it struck 90 targets across Gaza in the last day, killing militants and targeting militant infrastructure in north Gaza and Gaza City.
  - Al Jazeera reported that an Israeli strike hit an apartment in Nuseirat refugee camp, killing nine people including an infant and a child and injured others including children.
  - The Gaza Interior Ministry and a local hospital said that an Israeli strike hit a house in Az-Zawayda, killing the head of the Hamas-run police force in Nuseirat along with 11 of his relatives.
- NNA reported that an Israeli strike hit Khiam, killing one person. The IDF said that it killed a Radwan Force militant and accused him of trying to restore Hezbollah infrastructure and violating the ceasefire.
- Al Jazeera reported that two people died due to malnutrition in Gaza including a 35-day-old infant.
- The IDF said a reserve officer from the 710th Combat Engineering Battalion and a reservist from the 749th Combat Engineering Battalion were critically injured in south Gaza after were struck by an explosive device while driving in a Humvee.
- NNA reported that an Israeli strike hit a motorcycle in Yohmor al-Shaqif, killing one person. The IDF said that it killed a Hezbollah commander and accused him of involvement in efforts to restore Hezbollah infrastructure and violating the ceasefire.

=== 20 July ===
- The Gaza Health Ministry reported that at least 130 bodies of people killed in Israeli attacks arrived at hospitals throughout Gaza in the past 24 hours, increasing its count of the Palestinian death toll in Gaza to 58,895.
- The IDF issued evacuation orders for parts of central Gaza.
- Al Jazeera reported that a four-year-old girl died due to malnutrition in Gaza.
- The IDF said that it destroyed 2.7 kilometres of tunnels in Jabalia.
- The IDF said that it demolished Hamas infrastructure in Beit Hanoun.
- The IDF said that the IAF struck approximately 75 militant targets, including members and compounds in the last day.
- The IDF reiterated its evacuation order for north Gaza.
- The Mujahideen Brigades announced that two of its senior militants were killed in an Israeli strike in Khan Yunis one day prior along with several relatives.
- At least 85 people were reportedly killed while trying to access aid at locations throughout Gaza. The IDF said that it fired warning shots at a gathering of thousands in north Gaza to remove "an immediate threat".
- AP reported that an Israeli strike hit tents in Khan Yunis, killing seven people including a five-year-old boy.
- Al Jazeera reported that an Israeli strike hit a home in Deir el-Balah, killing a woman and injuring others.
- The al-Qassam Brigades said that its snipers shot an Israeli soldier who was atop a tank in Shuja'iyya.
- Al Jazeera reported that a disabled person died due to starvation in Gaza.
- al-Quds Brigades said that it targeted an Israeli command post in north Khan Yunis.
- The IDF said it downed a weapons smuggling drone that flew from Egypt to Gaza.

=== 21 July ===
- The Gaza Health Ministry reported that at least 134 bodies of people killed in Israeli attacks arrived at hospitals throughout Gaza in the past 24 hours, increasing its count of the Palestinian death toll in Gaza to 59,029.
- The IDF conducted strikes on Hudaydah Port, saying that it targeted Houthi infrastructure at the port used for militant activities.
- The IDF said that the IAF downed a drone fired towards Israel from the east. The Houthis said that they launched drones towards multiple sites in Israel, including Ben Gurion International Airport and IDF sites in Ashdod and Jaffa.
- NNA reported that an Israeli strike hit a motorcycle in at-Tiri, killing one person. The IDF said that it killed a Hezbollah militant involved in restoring the group's capabilities in Bint Jbeil.
- The IDF said that it arrested a militant cell planning an attack in Bethlehem.
- The IDF said that a soldier from the 13th Battalion of the Golani Brigade was killed while another was injured in an operational accident in Khan Yunis, which it blamed on an ammunition blast in a fortified position where they were staying.
- Al Jazeera reported that a man sustained injuries after Israeli settlers attacked houses in al-Rakeez village in Masafer Yatta.
- AP reported that Israeli strikes in Gaza killed at least 18 people including five children and three women.

=== 22 July ===
- The IDF said that a missile launched towards Israel from Yemen was downed. The Houthis said they launched a "hypersonic ballistic missile" towards Ben Gurion airport.
- Local health authorities said an Israeli strike hit tents in Gaza City, killing at least 16 people.
- The IDF said that a reservist from the 7020th Battalion of the 5th Brigade was killed during combat in Rafah after a suspected planted explosive triggered a building collapse.
- The IDF announced that a non-commissioned officer was critically injured by anti-tank fire in Deir al-Balah.
- The Trump administration withdrew from UNESCO, citing "anti-Israel rhetoric".
- An Israeli strike hit a home in Gaza City, killing at least 12 people including two women and six children. The IDF said that it targeted a PIJ militant.
- The IDF announced that two combat engineers, including a platoon commander, were critically injured and another soldier was moderately wounded by an explosive device while operating in Rafah.
- Shifa Hospital said that another Israeli strike in Gaza City killed three children.

=== 23 July ===
- The Gaza Health Ministry said that an Israeli strike hit an apartment in north Gaza, killing at least six people including two women and three children. The IDF said that it targeted a Hamas militant.
- The IDF said that it struck almost 120 targets across Gaza in the last day, including militant cells, tunnels and booby-trapped structures. It also said that it killed "a number of" Hamas militants in a strike in Jabalia.

=== 24 July ===
- The Gaza Health Ministry reported that at least 79 bodies of people killed in Israeli attacks arrived at hospitals throughout Gaza in the past 24 hours, increasing its count of the Palestinian death toll in Gaza to 59,587.
- The IDF said that a tank soldier from the 71st Battalion of the 188th Armored Brigade was critically injured in combat in south Gaza.
- The IDF said that eight of its soldiers were injured in a car-ramming at a bus stop at the Beit Lid junction near Kfar Yona.
- An Israeli strike east of Deir al-Balah killed two people including a woman.
- The IDF announced that eight soldiers were injured, including two moderately and six slightly in an "operational accident" in north Gaza.
- The IDF said that the IAF killed a Hezbollah militant and struck several facilities in south Lebanon.
- AP reported that five children died due to malnourishment in Gaza.
- The IDF said that it downed a UAV from Yemen.
- The IDF said that killed it Hamas's Sheikh Radwan Battalion deputy commander in a strike in the Gaza.

=== 25 July ===
- The Gaza Health Ministry reported that at least 80 bodies of people killed in Israeli attacks arrived at hospitals throughout Gaza in the past 24 hours, increasing its count of the Palestinian death toll in Gaza to 59,676.
- The IDF and Shin Bet said that they killed Hamas' chief of counterintelligence in a strike in north Gaza two days prior and accused him of "suppressing opposition to regime" in Gaza and building an intelligence assessment which assists executing militant attacks. The IDF also said that the IAF struck dozens of targets throughout Gaza in the last 24 hours including militant cells, buildings used by militant groups, tunnels, weapons caches and other related infrastructure.
- The IDF announced that it killed Hezbollah's chief of personnel for Bint Jbeil who it accused of involvement in efforts to restore the group's capabilities, recruit militants and violate the ceasefire.
- Shifa hospital officials said that an Israeli strike hit a school sheltering displaced people in Gaza City, killing at least five people including an 11-year-old boy.
- Israel announced that Jordan and the United Arab Emirates will be allowed to resume airdrops of humanitarian supplies into Gaza.
- The IDF announced that it downed a missile fired at Israel from Yemen.

=== 26 July ===
- The IDF said that a "projectile" launched from south Gaza towards Israel likely struck an open area.
- The IDF said that the IAF struck more than 100 militant targets in the Gaza in the last day, including cells, combat tunnels, infrastructure, anti-tank missile posts, and facilities used to store weapons. It also said that an Israeli aircraft attacked and killed a militant cell which planted an explosive device targeting its forces and a struck a launcher after an anti-tank missile was launched at forces in the area.
- The Lebanese Health Ministry said that one person was killed in a strike in south Lebanon.
- AP reported that a 5-month-old infant girl died due to malnutrition in Gaza.
- The IDF announced that a soldier died due to injuries sustained during combat in south Gaza on 19 July. Two IDF soldiers were also killed by an explosive device apparently planted by Hamas militants inside a Namer armored personnel carrier in Khan Yunis, increasing the IDF death toll to 459.
- The IDF said it delivered seven airdrop packages with humanitarian aid into Gaza, containing flour, sugar, and canned food.

=== 27 July ===
- The Gaza Health Ministry reported that at least 88 people were killed in Israeli attacks arrived at hospitals throughout Gaza in the past 24 hours, increasing its count of the Palestinian death toll in Gaza to 59,821.
- Al Jazeera reported that an Israeli strike hit a tent in the Israeli designated safe zone of al-Mawasi, killing at least five people.
- The IDF announced that it will pause combat for 10 hours a day in Gaza's three populated areas until further notice.
- Al Jazeera reported that six people including two children died due to malnutrition in Gaza.
- The IDF said that it demolished a Hamas tunnel measuring 500 metres in Beit Hanoun.
- The IDF said that four soldiers, including a commander from the 585th Battalion and a tracker from the Gaza Division of the Southern Brigade were injured by an explosive device in Rafah.
- The IDF announced that it killed two Radwan Force militants in a strike in Debaal one day prior and accused them of involvement in efforts to restore the Radwan Force's capabilities, planning attacks and violating the ceasefire.

=== 28 July ===
- The Gaza Health Ministry reported that at least 100 people were killed in Israeli attacks arrived at hospitals throughout Gaza in the past 24 hours, increasing its count of the Palestinian death toll in Gaza to 59,921.
- Nasser Hospital reported that an Israeli strike hit a home in al-Mawasi, killing 12 people including a child and a woman.
- Nasser Hospital reported that an Israeli strike hit a two-story home in Khan Yunis, killing at least 11 people including children and women.
- The IDF said that it uncovered weapons and a Hamas tunnel around a former school building and destroyed structures used by militant cells that were targeting its forces in Jabalia.
- The IDF announced that the IAF killed a militant from Hezbollah's artillery array in a strike in Bint Jbeil.
- Dunya News reported that 14 people died of malnutrition in Gaza, increasing its count of the death toll from malnutrition since the start of the war to 147.
- Palestinian activist and consultant on the 2024 documentary No Other Land, Awdah Hathaleen, was killed by an Israeli settler in Umm al-Khair, Hebron.

=== 29 July ===
- The Gaza Health Ministry reported that at least 113 people were killed in Israeli attacks in Gaza in the past 24 hours, increasing its count of the Palestinian death toll in Gaza to 60,034.
- Al Arabiya reported that Israeli strikes hit houses in Nuseirat refugee camp, killing at least 30 people including 12 children and 14 women.
- The IDF said that the IAF struck dozens of militant targets including militants, buildings used by militant groups, tunnels, and weapons caches in Gaza in the last day. It also released footage showing a strike on a Hamas weapons depot in Khan Yunis.
- The IDF said that it found a Hamas tunnel measuring one kilometer in Khan Yunis.

=== 30 July ===
- The Gaza Health Ministry reported that at least 104 people were killed in Israeli attacks in Gaza in the past 24 hours, increasing its count of the Palestinian death toll in Gaza to 60,138.
- The Gaza Health Ministry reported that seven people including a two-year-old child with an existing health condition died due to malnutrition, increasing its count of the death toll from malnutrition since the start of the war to 154.
- The IDF said that the IAF intercepted a drone fired towards Israel by the Houthis in the vicinity of the Egyptian border.
- At least 48 people were killed while waiting 3 kilometers away from the Zikim Crossing in north Gaza. The IDF said that dozens of Gazans gathered around aid trucks in close proximity to soldiers in the area, which prompted them to fire warning shots.
- Middle East Eye reported that an Israeli drone hit the minaret of the Abu Salim Mosque in Deir al-Balah, making it the second time the mosque was hit by an Israeli drone.
- Slovenia imposed a complete ban on the import, export, and transit of arms and military equipment to and from Israel over its actions in the war.

=== 31 July ===
- The Gaza Health Ministry reported that at least 111 people were killed in Israeli attacks in Gaza in the past 24 hours, increasing its count of the Palestinian death toll in Gaza to 60,249.
- The IDF said that its 98th Division ended its activities in north Gaza.
- The Trump administration imposed sanctions against officials of the Palestinian Authority and the Palestine Liberation Organization.
- Twelve people were killed around the Netzarim Corridor. The IDF said that it fired warning shots to disperse crowds.
- A US citizen was killed after an Israeli settler attack in Silwad due to suffocation, making him the second US citizen to be killed in the West Bank in July 2025.
- Israeli strikes were reported by Lebanese media in the Bekaa Valley. The IDF said that it struck Hezbollah "strategic weapons" sites and accused the group of attempting to restore them and violating the ceasefire. Four people were killed in the strikes.
- Local hospitals announced that two more Palestinians died from starvation, increasing the death toll to 159.
- Israel evacuated its diplomats from the United Arab Emirates after the Israeli National Security Council increased travel warnings for Israelis staying in the country.

== August ==
=== 1 August ===
- The Gaza Health Ministry reported that at least 82 people were killed in Israeli attacks in Gaza in the past 24 hours, increasing its count of the Palestinian death toll in Gaza to 60,332.
- The IDF said that it downed a missile fired from Yemen at Israel.
- France dropped 40 tonnes of humanitarian aid in Gaza.

=== 2 August ===
- The Gaza Health Ministry reported that at least 98 people were killed in Israeli attacks in Gaza in the past 24 hours, increasing its count of the Palestinian death toll in Gaza to 60,430.
- The IDF said that it defeated a Hamas battalion in Beit Hanoun. It also said that three Hamas militants surrendered in the same area.
- The IDF said that it downed a rocket launched from south Gaza towards Israel.
- A settler attack in Aqraba, Nablus killed one Palestinian and injured seven others.

=== 3 August ===
- The Gaza Health Ministry reported that at least 119 people were killed in Israeli attacks in Gaza in the past 24 hours, increasing its count of the Palestinian death toll in Gaza to 60,839.
- The Palestine Red Crescent Society announced that one of its staff members was killed and three others were injured in an Israeli attack which hit its headquarters in Khan Yunis.
- The Gaza Health Ministry reported that six people died due to malnutrition in Gaza, increasing its count of the death toll from malnutrition since the start of the war to 175.

=== 4 August ===
- The Gaza Health Ministry reported that at least 94 people were killed in Israeli attacks in Gaza in the past 24 hours, increasing its count of the Palestinian death toll in Gaza to 60,933.
- AP reported that eight people were killed in the vicinity of a Gaza Humanitarian Foundation site in Netzarim Corridor. The IDF said it fired warning shots towards people who approached “in a manner that posed a threat to the troops”.
- Agenzia Nova reported that a nurse from the Al-Aqsa Martyrs Hospital died after being hit by an aid package that was airdropped over Deir al-Balah.
- The Canadian Armed Forces dropped 9,800 kilograms of humanitarian aid in Gaza.

=== 5 August ===
- The Gaza Health Ministry reported that at least 87 people were killed in Israeli attacks in Gaza in the past 24 hours, increasing its count of the Palestinian death toll in Gaza to 61,020.
- The IDF said that it intercepted a missile fired from Yemen towards Israel.
- Israel's Coordinator of Government Activities in the Territories said that a limited number of merchants in Gaza approved by Israeli officials will be allowed to bring aid into Gaza for the first time since combat resumed.
- The IDF said that it found dozens of hidden weapons and destroyed a tunnel over a mile long while operating in Khan Yunis. It also accused militant organizations in Gaza of continuing to use civilian infrastructure for militant purposes.
- Lebanese Prime Minister Nawaf Salam ordered the Lebanese Army to formulate a plan to monopolize weapons in Lebanon by end of 2025.
- The Lebanese Health Ministry said that an Israeli drone attack hit a vehicle in Baalbek, killing one person.

=== 6 August ===
- The Gaza Health Ministry reported that at least 138 people were killed in Israeli attacks in Gaza in the past 24 hours, increasing its count of the Palestinian death toll in Gaza to 61,158.
- The IDF ordered to evacuate Zaytun Quarter of Gaza City, and the Nasser neighborhood of Khan Yunis.
- The IDF said that it killed a Hezbollah militant who operated from Lebanon to direct militant cells in Syria. It also said that these militant cells planned to launch rockets attacks towards the Golan Heights.
- Lebanese media reported that a series of Israeli strikes hit south Lebanon. The IDF said that it targeted Hezbollah militant infrastructure sites and accused the group of using Lebanese population as human shields and violating ceasefire.
- The Gaza Health Ministry reported that five more people died due to malnutrition in Gaza, increasing its count of the death toll from malnutrition since the start of the war to 193, including 96 children.

=== 7 August ===
- The Gaza Health Ministry reported that at least 100 people were killed in Israeli attacks in Gaza in the past 24 hours, increasing its count of the Palestinian death toll in Gaza to 61,258.
- The IDF ordered to evacuate four areas in the Daraj and Tuffah neighborhoods of Gaza City.
- Four people died due to malnutrition in Gaza, increasing death toll from malnutrition since the start of the war as counted by the Gaza health ministry to 197.
- Lebanon's National News Agency said that an Israeli airstrike near Masnaa killed six people, including Mohammed Wishah, a member of the central committee of the PFLP, and his bodyguard.

=== 8 August ===
- The Gaza Health Ministry reported that at least 72 people were killed in Israeli attacks in Gaza in the past 24 hours, increasing its count of the Palestinian death toll in Gaza to 61,330.
- The IDF said that it downed two drones fired towards Israel from the east.
- Netanyahu's plan to take control of Gaza City was approved by the Israeli security cabinet.
- Germany halted export to Israel of weapons which could be used in Gaza.
- The IDF and Shin Bet said that they killed PIJ's Beit Hanoun Battalion deputy commander and its anti-tank division deputy head in Gaza City who were involved in planning attacks against Israeli forces, including the 7 October attacks. It added it killed several Hamas and PIJ militants who were involved in rocket and mortar fire.
- The IDF said that it killed the intelligence chief of Hezbollah's Radwan force in the vicinity of Adloun.

=== 9 August ===
- The Gaza Health Ministry reported that at least 39 people were killed in Israeli attacks in Gaza in the past 24 hours, increasing its count of the Palestinian death toll in Gaza to 61,369.
- The Gaza Health Ministry reported that 11 more people died due to malnutrition in Gaza, increasing its count of the death toll from malnutrition since the start of the war to 212, including 98 children.
- Local media reported that an Israeli strike in Shuja'iyya killed two nephews of a senior Hamas leader.
- The Palestinian Islamic Jihad assumed responsibility for launching a rocket towards Israel.

=== 10 August ===
- The Gaza Health Ministry reported that at least 61 people were killed in Israeli attacks in Gaza in the past 24 hours, increasing its count of the Palestinian death toll in Gaza to 61,430.
- The IDF said that two projectiles fired from Gaza towards Israel fell in open areas.
- A 15-year-old boy was struck and killed by an airdropped aid pallet in Nuseirat.
- Al Jazeera reported that an Israeli strike hit a tent housing its journalists near the main gate of the Al-Shifa Hospital complex, killing seven people, including four of the broadcaster's staff. The IDF accused that those killed were militants.

=== 11 August ===
- The Gaza Health Ministry reported that at least 69 people were killed in Israeli attacks in Gaza in the past 24 hours, increasing its count of the Palestinian death toll in Gaza to 61,499.
- Gaza media reported that an Israeli strike hit a building in the Zeitoun neighborhood of eastern Gaza City, killing seven children. The IDF said that it targeted Hamas militants in their command center. The IDF said it was unaware of any civilian casualties, but accused militant organizations in Gaza of using human shields.
- The IDF announced that a soldier from 401st Armored Brigade was slightly wounded in a Hamas sniper attack in north Gaza one day prior. The IDF said that it killed Hamas militants and the sniper. It added that it destroyed several significant underground sites and killed militants in Khan Yunis, destroyed tunnel shafts in the vicinity of Gaza border communities and killed a militant cell trying to plant explosives in south Gaza through an airstrike.

=== 12 August ===
- The Gaza Health Ministry reported that at least 100 people were killed in Israeli attacks in Gaza in the past 24 hours, increasing its count of the Palestinian death toll in Gaza to 61,599.
- The IDF announced that it killed militants disguised as World Central Kitchen workers in an airstrike in Gaza in the past week.
- The IDF said that the IAF downed a drone which was fired from Yemen.
- NNA reported an Israeli drone attack in the port area of Naqoura.
- The Palestinian Islamic Jihad assumed responsibility for launching a rocket towards Israel.

=== 13 August ===
- The Gaza Health Ministry reported that at least 123 people were killed in Israeli attacks in Gaza in the past 24 hours, increasing its count of the Palestinian death toll in Gaza to 61,722.
- The Gaza Health Ministry reported that eight more people died due to malnutrition in Gaza, increasing its count of the death toll from malnutrition since the start of the war to 235, including 106 children.
- The IDF announced that it killed the Nukhba Force's deputy commander in the central Jabalya battalion following a joint operation by the IDF and Shin Bet. It also said that the militant participated in the 7 October attacks and the abduction of three Israeli soldiers.
- The IDF said that it intercepted a missile launched by the Houthis towards Israel.

=== 14 August ===
- The Gaza Health Ministry reported that at least 54 people were killed in Israeli attacks in Gaza in the past 24 hours, increasing its count of the Palestinian death toll in Gaza to 61,776.
- The IDF said that it struck Hezbollah underground infrastructure in south Lebanon and accused the group of violating the ceasefire.
- Israeli far-right Finance Minister Bezalel Smotrich announced outlines for more than 3,000 housing units in the West Bank E1 settlement between East Jerusalem and Ma'ale Adumim. The UN Human Rights Office called the actions as a war crime.

=== 15 August ===
- The Gaza Health Ministry reported that at least 51 people were killed in Israeli attacks in Gaza in the past 24 hours, increasing its count of the Palestinian death toll in Gaza to 61,827.
- The Gaza Health Ministry reported that a child died due to malnutrition in Gaza, increasing its count of the death toll from malnutrition since the start of the war to 240, including 107 children.
- The IDF said that it sealed a tunnel measuring more than four miles in Beit Hanoun.
- The IDF said that it attacked a Hezbollah site in Beaufort Ridge after identifying "military activity" and accused the group of violating the ceasefire.

=== 16 August ===
- The Gaza Health Ministry reported that at least 70 people were killed in Israeli attacks in Gaza in the past 24 hours, increasing its count of the Palestinian death toll in Gaza to 61,897.
- Nasser Hospital officials and witnesses said that an Israeli strike hit a tent in the designated safe area of al-Mawasi, killing three members of a family including a woman and a child.
- The Gaza Health Ministry said that eleven people died due to malnutrition in Gaza in the last 24 hours, including one child, increasing its count of the death toll from malnutrition since the start of the war to 251.
- The Trump administration stopped all visitor visas for Gazans.
- The IDF announced that it will allow to resume the supply of tents and other sheltering equipment in the Gaza, as part of its preparations for the southward "transfer of population".

=== 17 August ===
- The Gaza Health Ministry reported that at least 47 people were killed in Israeli attacks in Gaza, and seven people died due to malnutrition in the past 24 hours, increasing its count of the Palestinian death toll in Gaza to 61,944, and its count of the death toll from malnutrition since the start of the war to 258.
- The IDF said that the Israeli Navy struck "an energy infrastructure site" in the vicinity of Sanaa.
- The IDF intercepted a missile launched at Israel from Yemen.
- The IDF said that it downed a rocket fired at Israel from Gaza.

=== 18 August ===
- The Gaza Health Ministry reported that at least 60 people were killed in Israeli attacks in Gaza, increasing its count of the Palestinian death toll in Gaza to 62,004.
- The Gaza Health Ministry announced that five people died due to malnutrition in Gaza in the last 24 hours, including two children, increasing its count of the death toll from malnutrition since the start of the war to 263, including 112 children.
- The IDF said that it destroyed rocket launchers in south Gaza aimed towards Israel.
- The IDF said that a single projectile launched from south Gaza fell within Gaza.
- An IDF officer was moderately wounded by militants in the Zeitoun district of Gaza City, according to the IDF.
- The BBC reported witnessing masked Israeli settlers from an illegal outpost destroying farmland belonging to a Palestinian family in Turmus Ayya, destroying olive trees and setting fire to other vegetation, with settlers in quad bikes chasing out rescue teams trying to approach the area.

=== 19 August ===
- The Gaza Health Ministry reported that at least 60 people were killed in Israeli attacks in Gaza, increasing its count of the Palestinian death toll in Gaza to 62,064.
- The IDF reported that earlier in August it killed a Hamas militant who took part in the abduction of Yarden Bibas during the 7 October attacks.
- The Palestinian Islamic Jihad assumed responsibility for launching a rocket towards Israel.
