= Al-Yassin 105 =

Missile used by Hamas

- Type: Anti-tank rocket-propelled grenade
- Place of origin: Palestine

Service history
- In service: October 29, 2023
- Used by: (Hamas) Qassam Brigades (Palestinian Islamic Jihad) Saraya al-Quds
- Wars: Gaza war

Production history
- Designer: Izz ad-Din al-Qassam Brigades
- Designed: Believed to be in 2023
- Manufacturer: Qassam Brigades
- Produced: 2023–present

Specifications
- Mass: 4.5 kg
- Length: 95 cm (37")
- Crew: 1 or 2
- Caliber: 64/105 mm, rocket motor; Anti-armor head, 105 mm explosive shell
- Muzzle velocity: 300 m/s
- Effective firing range: 500 m
- Sights: Iron or telescopic sights.

The Al-Yassin 105 (Arabic: الياسين 105) is a rocket-propelled grenade developed by Hamas. It was first deployed in 2023. It was named after the spiritual leader of Hamas, Ahmed Yassin.

The shell is primarily used by the Izz al-Din al-Qassam Brigades, and was used for the first time in the Gaza war.

== History ==
Unveiled on October 29, 2023, the Yassin 105 was reportedly developed by Hamas engineers from the Research and Industry Unit with Hamas commander Izz al-Din al-Haddad overseeing its development. It was first used against Israeli armor and Merkava tanks during the Israeli invasion of the Gaza Strip. In June, 2024, it was used to target an Israeli armored vehicle. The vehicle was destroyed and 8 Israeli soldiers were killed.
