= Al-Atatra =

Neighborhood in Gaza, Palestine

Coordinates: 31°33′28″N 34°29′12″E

Al-Atatra العطاطرة
- Suburb
- Atatreh
- Interactive map of Al-Atatra العطاطرة
- Country: Palestine
- Governorate: North Gaza Governorate
- City: Beit Lahiya
- Time zone: UTC+2 (EET)
  - Summer (DST): +3

Al-Atatra (Arabic: العطاطرة) is a northwestern neighborhood in the city of Beit Lahiya in the northern Gaza Strip. Its residents, the majority of whom are farmers or landowners are not Palestinian refugees, unlike most of the population in the Gaza Strip, including Beit Lahiya. A major cash crop in al-Atatra are strawberries which were mainly exported to Israel and the West Bank before Israel's siege of the Gaza Strip following the territory's control by Hamas, a Palestinian paramilitary and political organization.

Al-Atatra was the target of assaults by the Israel Defense Forces (IDF) during the Gaza War in 2008–09. At least 16 civilians were reported killed, including five who belonged to the same family, during the first few days of the war. Between 40 and 50 houses were destroyed as well.

During the Gaza war, the neighborhood was almost entirely destroyed within three weeks of the first aerial bombardments on the Israel. An Israeli soldier was filmed waving a pride flag in the neighborhood on the backdrop of rubble in November 2023, drawing criticism from LGBTQ activists.
