= List of extrajudicial killings and political violence in Lebanon =

List of extrajudicial killings and political violence in Lebanon is a chronological record of lethal events including targeted political liquidations, acts of collective violence, state-sponsored executions and targeted killings, occurring within the geographic boundaries of modern Lebanon and its predecessor entities.

The scope of this list encompasses the historical continuum of violence from antiquity through to the present day. It documents incidents motivated by political, sectarian, or extralegal factors where loss of life occurred, involving both state and non-state actors. This includes the systematic targeting of professional classes, judicial figures, and non-combatants, as well as forensic witness suppression and lethal confrontations between armed factions. Each entry is recorded based on documented evidence of lethal intent, providing a comprehensive thematic dataset of the evolution of political violence and state-sanctioned or militia-led liquidations in the region.

== Antiquity (c.5000 BC–634 AD) ==
Name	Date	Location	Deaths	Victims	Perpetrators	Notes
Siege of Tyre (Assyrian)	701 BC	Tyre	Unknown	Tyrian resistance and civilians	Neo-Assyrian Empire under Sennacherib	During the suppression of a wide-scale Phoenician rebellion, Assyrian forces besieged Tyre. While the city did not fall completely, the surrounding mainland settlements were liquidated or forcibly depopulated, and the political leadership was forced into exile, marking a period of intense extralegal imperial violence in the region.
Assyrian Sack of Arwad	663 BC	Arwad	Unknown	Phoenician residents and mariners	Neo-Assyrian Empire under Ashurbanipal	Following a naval blockade, Ashurbanipal launched a punitive expedition against the island-city of Arwad. The campaign involved the execution of rebellious local officials and the forced deportation of skilled laborers to Nineveh, a standard Neo-Assyrian practice of state-sanctioned demographic liquidation.
Siege of Tyre (586–573 BC)	586–573 BC	Tyre, Phoenicia	Unknown	Tyrian military and civilians	Neo-Babylonian Empire (under Nebuchadnezzar II)	Following the fall of Jerusalem, Neo-Babylonian King Nebuchadnezzar II besieged the island city of Tyre for 13 years. The siege ended in a negotiated compromise where Tyre retained autonomy while acknowledging Babylonian suzerainty.
Suppression of the Phoenician Revolt	351 BC	Tripoli / Arwad	Unknown	Phoenician elites and merchants	Achaemenid Empire forces under Artaxerxes III	In the years leading up to the final fall of Sidon, Artaxerxes III conducted "cleansing" operations along the coast to secure his logistics for the Egyptian campaign. This involved the extrajudicial execution of pro-Greek merchant factions in Tripoli and Arwad who were suspected of financing rebel militias.
Siege of Sidon 343BC	343 BC	Sidon	40,000 (Estimated)	Sidon (Citizens and rebels)	Achaemenid Empire forces under Artaxerxes III	Following a Phoenician revolt, Artaxerxes III executed 100 prominent citizens and 500 supplicants after they surrendered. The remaining population reportedly set the city on fire to avoid capture, leading to a total loss of life. The Persians later sold the rights to the city's ruins to recover melted precious metals from the debris.
Siege of Tyre (332 BC)	332 BC	Tyre	8,000–10,000 (Estimated)	Tyre (Soldiers and civilians)	Macedonian Army under Alexander the Great	After a seven-month siege, Alexander’s forces killed 6,000 combatants during the final assault. He then ordered the summary execution of 2,000 military-aged survivors via crucifixion along the shoreline to deter further resistance. The remaining 30,000 residents were sold into slavery.
Destruction of Berytus	140 BC	Berytus	Unknown	Local residents	Forces of Diodotus Tryphon	During the Seleucid dynastic wars, the usurper Diodotus Tryphon razed the city to the ground as a punitive measure against the population for their support of his political rival. The site remained largely desolate until it was refounded as a Roman colony decades later.
Hasmonean campaign in Iturea	103 BC	Beqaa Valley	Unknown	Iturean tribes	Hasmonean dynasty under Aristobulus I	During the Hasmonean expansion into the northern Beqaa Valley, Aristobulus I launched a campaign of forced conversion and liquidation against the Iturean Arabs. Those who resisted the political and religious annexation of the territory were subject to summary execution or expulsion.
Roman Suppression of Berytus	15 AD	Berytus	Unknown	Local insurgent factions	Roman Imperial forces	Following the establishment of the Roman veteran colony, local resistance to land confiscation and Roman administrative law was met with systematic military policing. Extralegal executions were utilized to secure the coastal highway and protect the newly settled Roman elite in the district.
Suppression of the Zealots in Galilee/Lebanon	67	South Lebanon / Upper Galilee	2,000+	Jewish insurgents and local villagers	Roman Imperial Army under Vespasian	During the First Jewish-Roman War, Roman legions moved through the borderlands of modern Southern Lebanon to secure the supply lines to Tyre and Ptolemais. Local villages suspected of harboring Zealot insurgents were subjected to summary executions and massacres to prevent the spread of the rebellion into the Phoenician coastal cities.
Byzantine Purge of the Monophysites	512	Beqaa Valley / Jbeil	Unknown	Anti-Chalcedonian (Monophysite) clergy and villagers	(Byzantine Empire) Byzantine Imperial authorities	Following the Council of Chalcedon, Byzantine authorities intensified the liquidation of "heretical" factions in the Lebanese interior. This involved the extrajudicial removal of non-conforming bishops and the execution of local monks who refused to adhere to the imperial orthodox decree, forcing many to flee into the higher Qadisha peaks.
Massacre of the Monks of Saint Maron	517	Orontes River / Northern Borderlands	350	Maronite Monks	Non-Chalcedonian (Monophysite) militants	In one of the earliest recorded instances of sectarian liquidation in the region, 350 monks following the teachings of Saint Maron were massacred while traveling to a monastery. This event, cited in correspondence to Pope Hormisdas, marked the beginning of the Maronite community's retreat into the safer terrain of the Lebanese mountains to escape extrajudicial religious persecution.
Byzantine Suppression of the Samaritan Revolt & Cleansing of South Phoenicia	529	Southern coastal Lebanon. Tyre and Sidon hinterlands	Thousands (Massacred or enslaved)	Samaritan communities and dissident populations	(Byzantine Empire) Byzantine forces under Justinian I	Following the Samaritan uprisings in the Levant, Byzantine authorities conducted a series of lethal "cleansing" operations in the border regions between Tyre and Sidon. Local Samaritan populations and dissidents were summarily executed or enslaved, and their places of worship were destroyed to secure the ideological unity of the empire.
Sassanid Liquidation of Byzantine Elites	613	Sidon / Tyre	Unknown	Byzantine administrative officers and local Hellenized elites	Sassanid Persian forces under Shahrbaraz	During the initial sweep of the Sassanid invasion, the Persian high command conducted targeted liquidations of the Byzantine governing class. This was a strategic decapitation of the local administration designed to eliminate loyalist resistance before the final push toward Jerusalem.
Sassanid Sack of Berytus	614	Berytus	Unknown	Byzantine-Roman residents and officials	Sassanid Persian forces	During the final Byzantine–Sasanian War, Persian forces under Shahrbaraz captured the coastal cities of Phoenicia. The invasion was characterized by the targeted execution of Byzantine administrative classes and the destruction of the city's infrastructure. This event marked the definitive end of the Roman legal and academic tradition in Beirut before the Islamic conquest.

== Middle Ages (634–1516) ==
Name	Date	Location	Deaths	Victims	Perpetrators	Notes
The Massacre of the Jarajima (Mardaites)	694	Mount Lebanon	Unknown	Mardaite mountaineers and villagers	Umayyad Caliphate forces under Abd al-Malik ibn Marwan	Following the Mardaite insurgency against Umayyad rule, the Caliphate launched a series of punitive expeditions into the northern Lebanon range. The campaign involved the summary execution of Mardaite leaders and the forced relocation of thousands of residents to Syria and Anatolia to break the military strength of the Christian mountain enclave.
Siege and Sack of Baalbek	746	Baalbek	Thousands	Local residents and garrison	Umayyad Caliphate forces under Marwan II	During the Third Fitna (Islamic Civil War), the Umayyad Caliph Marwan II besieged the city. After its surrender, he ordered a general massacre of the male population and the dismantling of the city's Roman-era fortifications to punish the city for its support of rival Abbasid factions.
Siege of Acre	May 25, 1104	Acre	Thousands	(Fatimid Caliphate) Fatimid garrison and civilian refugees	Kingdom of Jerusalem & (Republic of Genoa) Genoese fleet	Following a 20-day siege, the Fatimid governor surrendered on the condition of safe passage for the inhabitants. However, as the civilians and garrison attempted to depart for Ascalon, Genoese and Crusader forces violated the truce and slaughtered the majority of the population to seize their possessions. This massacre set a terrifying precedent for the subsequent conquests of Beirut and Sidon, and triggered a massive influx of refugees into the mountains of Jabal Amil and the coastal cities of modern-day Lebanon.
Siege of Tripoli	July 12, 1109	Tripoli	Thousands (Estimated)	Fatimid garrison and civilians	Crusader forces under Bertrand of Toulouse	After a seven-year siege, Crusader forces sacked the city and executed a significant portion of its defenders and inhabitants. During the violence, the 'Dar al-Ilm' library was destroyed by fire, resulting in the loss of thousands of irreplaceable manuscripts.
Siege of Beirut (1110)	May 13, 1110	Beirut	Thousands	(Fatimid Caliphate) Fatimid garrison and civilian population	Kingdom of Jerusalem & (Republic of Genoa) Genoese fleet	Following a three-month siege by land and sea, King Baldwin I captured the city with naval support from the Genoese fleet. The fall of Beirut was accompanied by a sack and the killing of a large portion of the city's defenders and inhabitants after siege towers breached the walls. The city was subsequently established as the center of the Lordship of Beirut.
Siege of Sidon 1110 AD	October – December 1110	Sidon	Unknown	(Fatimid Caliphate) Fatimid garrison	Kingdom of Jerusalem, Kingdom of Norway & Republic of Venice	A successful joint operation by King Baldwin I, the Norwegian fleet led by King Sigurd I, and Venetian naval support. This was the principal military action of the Norwegian Crusade in the Levant. Unlike the violent aftermath of the siege of Beirut earlier that year, the Sidonese garrison was permitted to negotiate a peaceful surrender, allowing those who wished to depart for Damascus or Tyre to leave safely. The city was subsequently established as the Lordship of Sidon.
Siege of Tyre (1124)	July 7, 1124	Tyre	Unknown	Fatimid garrison and citizens	Crusader and Venetian forces	After a five-month siege by land and sea, the last Fatimid coastal stronghold surrendered. While negotiated terms allowed safe passage for departing garrison members, chroniclers noted the liquidation of remaining pockets of resistance and the systematic seizure of urban property, completing the displacement of Muslim administrative elites from the Lebanese littoral.
Assassination of Raymond II	1152	Tripoli	1	Raymond II	Nizari Ismaili Assassins	Raymond II was stabbed to death at the southern gate of Tripoli, becoming the first non-Muslim ruler to be murdered by the Order of Assassins. Two of his knights were also killed in the struggle. The motive is believed to have been retaliation for his granting of territory to the Knights Hospitaller to secure the frontier against Nizari incursions.
Assassination of Conrad of Montferrat	April 28, 1192	Tyre	1	Kingdom of Jerusalem (King-elect)	Nizari Ismaili Assassins (Hashshashin)	Conrad of Montferrat, the newly elected King of Jerusalem and de facto ruler of Tyre, was ambushed and stabbed by two Nizari Isma'ili fida'iyyin disguised as Christian monks. The assassination was ordered by the regional Grand Master Rashid ad-Din Sinan, though contemporary accounts dispute whether the strike was independently motivated or commissioned by external rivals, including Richard the Lionheart or Saladin. Conrad succumbed to his wounds the same day, triggering a major succession crisis within the Crusader leadership during the Third Crusade.
Mamluk Liquidation of Crusaders in Sidon	1253	Sidon	25+ (Forensically confirmed)	Crusader garrison	Mamluk Sultanate forces	Mass graves discovered at Saint Louis Castle revealed the remains of soldiers killed during the 1253 Mamluk raid. Forensic analysis showed evidence of summary execution, including sharp-force trauma to the back of the neck and decapitation wounds consistent with the execution of captured or fleeing personnel.
Sack of Baalbek	1260	Baalbek	Unknown	Garrison and city residents	Mongol Empire forces under Hulagu Khan	Following the Mongol invasion of the Levant, Baalbek was sacked and its fortifications were dismantled. The resisting garrison was liquidated as part of a broader Mongol policy of systematic violence to ensure the total submission of Levantine cities.
Aftermath from the Battle of Ayn Jalut		Beqaa Valley	Unknown	Mongol sympathizers and local elites	Mamluk Sultanate forces	Following the Mamluk victory over the Mongols at the Battle of Ain Jalut, Sultan Qutuz ordered the liquidation of local leaders in the Beqaa and South Lebanon who had defected to or assisted the Mongol occupiers. This was a targeted political purge designed to re-establish Mamluk authority through lethal deterrence.
Assassination of Philip of Montfort	August 17, 1270	Tyre	1	(Kingdom of Jerusalem) Lordship of Tyre	Nizari Ismaili Assassins (commissioned by Baibars)	Philip of Montfort, the Lord of Tyre and a prominent military commander in the Crusader Levant, was stabbed to death inside his castle chapel by a Nizari Isma'ili assassin. The operative had infiltrated the court by feigning a desire to convert to Christianity. Contemporary accounts attribute the assassination to the directive of Mamluk Sultan Baibars as part of a campaign to disrupt Crusader leadership in Tyre prior to further military operations.
Liquidation of the Assassins' Enclave	1273	Mount Lebanon / Akkar	Unknown	Nizari Ismaili militants and families	Mamluk Sultanate forces under Baibars	Following the systematic capture of their mountain fortresses, Sultan Baibars ordered the final liquidation of the Nizari Ismaili (Assassin) political presence in Lebanon. While many were integrated into Mamluk service, the leadership and those who resisted the annexation of their strategic strongholds in the north were summarily executed, ending their two-century-old era of extrajudicial political leverage.
The Fall of Banyas (Maronite Stronghold)	1282	Mount Lebanon	Unknown	Maronite defenders and non-combatants	Mamluk Sultanate forces	In the buildup to the final Mamluk conquest of the coast, a punitive expedition was launched against the Maronite strongholds of the north. The fall of Banyas involved the summary execution of the local "Muqaddamin" (leaders) to break the back of Maronite military cooperation with the County of Tripoli.
Mamluk Offensive against Jobbeh (Fall of Hadat)	May – August, 1283	Northern Mount Lebanon (specifically Ehden, Hadat, Hasroun, Hadchit and Bsharri).	Several thousand killed; thousands more displaced to Cyprus and the Qadisha caves.	Lebanese Maronite Christians	Mamluks	After decades of Maronite resistance against the Sultanate, Mamluk forces launched a massive siege on the northern strongholds. The campaign culminated in the fall of the mountain fortress of Hadat.This event led to the capture and execution of Patriarch Daniel of Hadshit, the leader of the resistance. It marked the end of Maronite political autonomy in the North for centuries and forced the population to seek refuge in the inaccessible heights of the Qadisha Valley.
The Sack of Tyre (Mamluk)	May 19, 1291	Tyre	Thousands	Crusader civilians and remaining garrison	Mamluk Sultanate forces	Following the Siege of Acre (1291), Mamluk forces occupied Tyre after the Crusader garrison fled by sea. The remaining population, left without protection, was subjected to mass violence and enslavement. Sultan al-Ashraf Khalil subsequently ordered the systematic demolition of the city's fortifications and cathedral to ensure it could never again serve as a bridgehead for European incursions.
Mamluk Purge of the Maronites	1291	Kisrawan / Jbeil	Unknown	Maronite peasants and clergy	Mamluk Sultanate forces	Immediately following the Fall of Acre, Mamluk Sultan al-Ashraf Khalil directed his forces into the Lebanese highlands. This campaign was a targeted liquidation of Maronite communities accused of providing logistical support to the departing Crusader forces. Many villages were burned, and survivors were executed or forced further into the high peaks of Mount Makmel.
Mamluk Invasion of Jabal Amil	July 1, 1292	Jabal Amil, South Lebanon	Hundreds to several thousand	Shia (Metwali) civilians	Mamluk Sultanate of Cairo	Following the fall of Acre, Sultan al-Ashraf Khalil launched a "scorched earth" campaign to secure the strategic corridors of the south. Led by the viceroy Baydara, Mamluk forces specifically targeted the Twelver Shia (Metwali) populations of Jabal 'Amil, who were perceived as a potential fifth column for a Crusader return. The campaign involved the summary execution of local chiefs and the destruction of agricultural infrastructure, forcing the initial demographic retreat of the Shia population from the coastal plains into the more rugged interior hinterland.
Mamluk Suppression of the Druze of the Shouf	1300	Shouf Mountains	Unknown	Druze villagers and militia	Mamluk Sultanate forces	Predating the Great Kisrawan Campaign, Mamluk forces conducted "cleansing" raids in the Shouf to punish Druze communities for their perceived neutrality or assistance during Mongol incursions. This involved the destruction of villages and the targeted killing of community elders.
Mamluk Kisrawan Campaigns	July 1305	Kisrawan and the surrounding Mount Lebanon range.	Thousands; 20,000+ displaced	Maronite and Druze populations	Mamluks	Following several failed attempts to subdue the mountain, the Mamluk Sultanate launched a massive "scorched earth" expedition with 50,000 soldiers. The goal was to eliminate "heterodox" groups accused of aiding Crusader and Mongol interests.
Hadath al-Jubbat Liquidation	January 1502	Hadath El Jebbeh, Bsharri District	High (Civilians and local leadership)	Maronite civilians and leadership	(Mamluk Sultanate) Mamluk punitive expedition	One of the final major punitive campaigns of the Mamluk Sultanate before its collapse. Mamluk forces launched a winter raid into the Besharri highlands to crush the autonomy of the Maronite muqaddams. The town of Hadath was sacked, and its primary leader, Muqaddam Abdel-Moneim, was captured and executed. Chroniclers like Ibn al-Qila'i record the widespread destruction of homes and churches, marking the effective end of the Muqaddam system as a sovereign military force and forcing the Maronites into a strategic alliance with the emerging Ottoman power.
The Sack of Beirut (Mamluk-Portuguese Conflict)	1503	Beirut	Unknown	Local residents and Mamluk garrison	Portuguese Navy under Vicente Sodré	During the Mamluk–Portuguese War, a Portuguese fleet bombarded and raided Beirut. The operation involved the targeted destruction of the port infrastructure and the liquidation of the local garrison to disrupt Mamluk trade routes. This marked the first significant Western maritime "extrajudicial" intervention in the city since the Crusades.
Liquidation of the Buhturid Emirs	1516	Aley / Shouf	Unknown	Druze Buhturid leadership	Mamluk Sultanate / Pro-Mamluk factions	In the chaotic final months of Mamluk rule, the Buhturid Emirs—who had governed the Gharb for centuries—were targeted for liquidation by factions seeking to align with the advancing Ottoman forces. This political decapitation of the Druze leadership cleared the way for the rise of the Ma'n dynasty under Ottoman patronage.

== Ottoman Era (1516–1918) ==
Name	Date	Location	Deaths	Victims	Perpetrators	Notes
Assassination of Muhammad Agha Shu'ayb	1528	Tripoli	2	Local tax-farming administration of Tripoli/Akkar	Agents of Emir Mansur Assaf.	Emir Muhammad Agha Shu'ayb, the regional ruler and primary Ottoman-subcontracted tax collector for the Akkar plains, was assassinated alongside his son by hitmen acting on the orders of his rival, Emir Mansur Assaf of the Keserwan-based Assaf dynasty. The ambush occurred inside the Taynal Mosque in Tripoli. The targeted elimination stemmed from a bitter jurisdictional conflict over local tax-farming rights (iltizam) after Assaf unilaterally bypassed Shu'ayb to install the Turkmen Sayfa clan in the region. Following the double assassination, the Assaf dynasty successfully seized administrative dominance over the territory and established the Sayfas as their direct clients.
Ottoman Invasion of Mount Lebanon	1585	Chouf District and Keserwan District	Thousands	Maronites and Druze	Ottoman forces under Ibrahim Pasha	Following a robbery of an Ottoman tax convoy (the İbrahim Pasha Incident), the Sultan sent a massive punitive expedition under the Governor of Egypt. The army engaged in a scorched earth policy, destroying the infrastructure of the Druze Mountain. This event led to the death of Emir Qurqumaz Ma'an (the father of the famous Fakhr-al-Din II) and forced a total reorganization of the mountain's feudal system. It is one of the earliest examples of Ottoman central authority using mass violence to break the autonomy of Lebanese emirs.
Battle of Anjar	November 1, 1623	Anjar, Beqaa Valley	Heavy (Ottoman) / Light (Ma'nid)	Ottoman Damascus Eyalet (Mustafa Pasha)	Mount Lebanon Emirate under Fakhr al-Din II	A landmark victory for Emir Fakhr al-Din II and his Ma'nid forces against an Ottoman coalition. Despite being outnumbered, the Emir's tactical use of terrain resulted in the routing of the Ottoman army and the capture of the Governor of Damascus, Mustafa Pasha. The victory forced the Ottoman Sublime Porte to acknowledge Fakhr al-Din's territorial authority, consolidating his control over Mount Lebanon and surrounding regions at the emirate's territorial peak.
The Execution of Fakhr al-Din II	April 13, 1635	Constantinople (Impact in Mount Lebanon)	Multiple	Fakhr al-Din II and his sons	Ottoman Imperial authorities	Following his defeat by Ottoman Forces at the Battle of Wadi al-Khazindar, the Druze Emir Fakhr al-Din II was captured and taken to Istanbul, where he and his sons were executed by order of Sultan Murad IV, dismantling his autonomous statelet in Mount Lebanon.
Campaign against the Hamade Sheikhs	1693	Jbeil / Kisrawan	Unknown	Hamade Shia leadership and civilians	Ottoman forces (Eyalet of Tripoli)	Following a tax revolt in the northern districts, Ottoman provincial forces launched a massive punitive expedition to liquidate the influence of the Shia Hamade clan. The campaign involved the summary execution of the clan's sheikhs and a "scorched earth" policy that forced the surviving Shia population to migrate toward the Beqaa and South Lebanon.
Ma'nid Succession Clashes	1697–1698	Shouf	Unknown	(Druze) Ma'nid family members and loyalists	Rival Druze factions (Yamani coalition)	Following the natural death of Emir Ahmad Ma'n in 1697 without a male heir, a succession struggle broke out among rival Druze clans. Clashes and targeted killings of remaining Ma'nid loyalists occurred during the transition of power to the Shihab dynasty.
Battle of Ain Dara	March 20, 1711	Ain Dara	Thousands	Yamani Druze factions	Qaysi Druze faction under the Shihab dynasty	During a decisive civil conflict for control of the Druze Emirate, the Qaysi faction led by the Shihabs nearly annihilated the rival Yamani leadership. The aftermath involved the systematic liquidation of Yamani notables and their families, leading to a massive exodus of Yamani Druze to the Jabal al-Druze in Syria and consolidating Shihab power for the next century.
Campaign against the Jabal 'Amil Sheikhs	September 1775	Jabal Amil, South Lebanon	High (Targeted leadership)	Shia (Metwali) Sheikhs and the Ali al-Saghir clan	(Ottoman Empire) Ottoman forces under Jazzar Pasha	Immediately following the collapse of Daher al-Umar's autonomous rule, the new Ottoman governor Jazzar Pasha conducted military campaigns against the Shia leadership of southern Lebanon. Leading sheikhs of the Ali al-Saghir family were executed or exiled, ending local Metwali autonomy in favor of centralized rule from Acre.
Massacre at Lehfed 1820	1820	Lehfed, Byblos District	Estimates of 50–100 prominent villagers and hundreds of homes destroyed.	(Lebanon) Maronites	Forces of Emir Bashir Shihab II	During the Ammiyya (commoners') uprisings against the heavy taxation of Emir Bashir II, the Emir’s forces, supported by Ottomans, launched a brutal crackdown on the village of Lehfed, which had become a center of peasant resistance. It was a rare instance of intra-sectarian massacre, where a Christian ruler used violence against his own Maronite subjects to maintain his tax collection rights for the Ottoman Sultan.
Repression at Baaqline	1825	Baaqline	Unknown	(Lebanon) Maronite and Christian residents	Druze irregulars and Forces of Emir Bashir Shihab II	Following the defeat of the Jumblatt faction, the Shouf district saw a period of intense instability. Druze irregulars, often acting as enforcers or in localized retaliations against the expansion of Bashir II’s Maronite-aligned administration, engaged in the plundering of Christian homes and the summary execution of those suspected of aiding the Shihabist consolidation of the southern districts.
Liquidation of the Jbeil Sheikhs	1838	Jbeil	Multiple	Shia Hamade notables	(Ottoman Empire) Ottoman forces	During the final years of Egyptian rule and the return of Ottoman administration, during the transition following the Egyptian–Ottoman War (1831–1833), Ottoman authorities conducted a series of liquidations against the Hamade family leadership to permanently break their feudal autonomy in Mount Lebanon. These executions were a state-led effort to centralize power before the implementation of the Tanzimat reforms.
Clashes at Deir al-Qamar	September 15–16, 1841	Deir al-Qamar	17–20 Notables	Druze Abu Nakad leadership	Maronite fighters	A targeted attack on members of the Abu Nakad clan during the outbreak of sectarian clashes in Mount Lebanon.
Deir al-Qamar Massacre 1841	October - November, 1841	Deir al-Qamar, Chouf District	1,000–1,500	(Lebanon) Maronites	Druze militias	After a dispute over hunting rights, Druze fighters besieged the town and massacred local Christian residents. The Ottoman garrison failed to protect Christian residents, prompting European diplomatic intervention and the establishment of the Double Qaim-Maqamate of Mount Lebanon system.
Sack of Zahleh 1841	October 1841	Zahleh	Unknown	(Lebanon) Christian (mostly Melkite) residents	Druze militias	Simultaneous with the siege of Deir al-Qamar, Druze forces attacked the town of Zahleh. While the town’s defenders put up significant resistance, the surrounding villages were burned and those captured were subject to summary execution.
Massacre at Jazzine 1841	November 1841	Jazzine	Hundreds	(Lebanon) Maronite and Greek Catholic residents	Druze irregulars	Following the fall of Deir al-Qamar, Druze forces moved south to the Christian enclave of Jazzine. The town was sacked and many inhabitants were executed or forced to flee into the surrounding mountains. This event expanded the conflict into the southern districts and finalized the demographic separation of the southern Beqaa borderlands.
The Sectarian Conflict of 1845 (Mallaqa & Zahleh)	May – June, 1845	The Matn, the Chouf, and the Bekaa (specifically Mallaqa and Zahle).	Estimated several hundred deaths; dozens of villages burned.	(Lebanon) Lebanese Maronite Christians	Druze militias	This was a period of systemic tit-for-tat killings that followed the failed 1841 partition. In the Bekaa, the town of Mallaqa was attacked, and Zahleh was besieged. The Ottoman military often intervened only after Christian villages were already disarmed and vulnerable. This conflict proved that the Double Qaimaqamate (the administrative division of Lebanon into two sectarian sectors) was a failure. It directly led to the total social breakdown that caused the 1860 Civil War.
Suppression of the Shihab Leadership	1845	Baabda, Emirate of Mount Lebanon	Multiple	Shihab family leaders and loyalists	Ottoman forces	Ottoman military forces intervened during renewed sectarian clashes to suppress remaining Shihab political agitation, exiling key family leaders and consolidating the Double Qaimaqamate governance system.
Massacre of Jezzine (1860)	June 1, 1860	Jezzine	1,200+	(Lebanon) Christian (mostly Maronite) residents	Druze militias	In the opening days of the 1860 conflict, Druze forces overran the Christian stronghold of Jezzine. Following the town's surrender, a systematic liquidation occurred where hundreds of men were executed and the town was pillaged. The event triggered a massive refugee crisis toward Sidon and Beirut, setting the tone for the escalating sectarian violence of that summer.
Hasbaya Massacre	June 11, 1860	Hasbaya	~1,000	(Lebanon) Maronites	Druze militias	Approx. 1,000 Christian refugees who had sought protection in the Shihabi Serail were slaughtered by Druze forces. The massacre occurred after the Ottoman garrison commander, Osman Bey, disarmed the Christian population under the pretext of providing security.
Massacre of Rashaya	June 11, 1860	Rashaya	~800	(Lebanon) Christian (mostly Greek Orthodox) residents	Druze militias	Following a pattern seen in Hasbaya, the Christian population sought refuge in the local citadel. After being persuaded to surrender their weapons by the Ottoman commander, the gates were opened to Druze fighters. The ensuing liquidation of the male population was noted for its extreme brutality and the failure of the Ottoman state to uphold its protective mandate.
The Fall of Zahleh (1860)	June 18, 1860	Zahleh	Estimated 700–900	(Lebanon) Christian (mostly Melkite) residents	Druze militias and Kurdish irregulars	Zahleh, the last major Christian stronghold in the Beqaa, was besieged by a large coalition of Druze and Kurdish forces. After the defenders' lines collapsed, the city was sacked and burned. The extrajudicial killing of non-combatants and the destruction of the city's commercial wealth marked the total collapse of Christian administrative power in the Beqaa Valley.
The Massacre of Sidon's Gardens	June 18, 1860	Sidon outskirts	~300	(Lebanon) Lebanese Christians	Druze irregulars and local rioters	As Christian refugees from the Shouf attempted to reach the safety of Sidon, they were intercepted in the city's gardens and outskirts. This execution of non-combatants occurred while the city's Ottoman garrison remained neutral, providing another example of state-sanctioned failure to protect vulnerable populations.
Pillage of the Western Beqaa Villages	June 15, 1860 – June 22, 1860	Western Beqaa District (including Mashghara, Aitanit, Saghbine, Joub Jannine, and adjacent hamlets)	Hundreds (Displaced: Thousands)	(Lebanon) Christian (Maronite and Melkite) rural populations	Druze irregulars and local tribal factions	Operating concurrently with the siege and fall of Zahleh, Druze forces and local irregulars swept through the mixed agricultural settlements of the southern and western Beqaa Valley corridor, heavily targeting the Christian populations. The campaign focused on widespread economic decapitation, including the burning of ancestral homes, systematic crop destruction, and the total seizure of livestock. While the immediate death toll was lower than the major urban massacres, the intense intimidation triggered a total humanitarian panic, forcing thousands of Christian families to permanently abandon their properties and flee to the coast, establishing a deep historical precedent for demographic shifts in the district.
2nd Deir al-Qamar Massacre (1860)	June 20–21, 1860	Deir al-Qamar, Chouf District	1,200 — 2,200	(Lebanon) Maronites	Druze militias and Ottoman Army	Occurred despite a signed truce, the town's residents were disarmed by the local Ottoman governor under the guarantee of safety. Once the population was defenseless, Druze forces entered the town and engaged in a systematic slaughter of the male population. The failure of the Ottoman garrison to intervene is cited by historians as evidence of state-sanctioned negligence or complicity. The town was looted and burned, and the male population was largely executed. This event prompted the 1860 French expedition to Lebanon.
1860 Mount Lebanon civil war	July 9–11, 1860	Beirut and Damascus, Syria	7,000–25,000	(Lebanon) Christians	Ottoman troops, Muslim mobs, Druze militias, Kurdish irregulars.	During the 1860 Civil conflict in mMunt Lebanon, Large massacres of Christians at Deir al-Qamar, Hasbaya, and Rashaya took place with Druze casualties as well. Many Christians fled to Damascus, where Muslim mobs with the help of rogue Ottoman troops and minimal Druze involvement massacred several thousand Christian civilians; 326 villages, 560 churches, 28 colleges, 42 convents, and 9 other religious establishments were completely destroyed.
1860 Maronite Reprisals	August – September 1860	Metn District and Chouf District	Hundreds	Druze	(Lebanon) Lebanese Maronite Christian irregulars	Following the arrival of the French expeditionary force, Maronite militias launched a series of reprisal raids against Druze villages that had participated in the earlier summer massacres. These "tit-for-tat" liquidations often involved the summary execution of adult males and the burning of property. While lower in scale than the June massacres, they were forensically critical in cementing the permanent demographic shifts in the mixed districts of Mount Lebanon.
Execution of Ahmed Pasha	September 5, 1860	Damascus / Mount Lebanon impact	Multiple	(Ottoman Empire) Ahmed Pasha and senior officers	(Ottoman Empire) Ottoman Imperial executioners under Fuad Pasha	Following international pressure and the arrival of French troops, the Ottoman state executed its own military commander, Ahmed Pasha, for his "criminal negligence" and complicity in the 1860 massacres. This was a strategic political liquidation designed to appease European powers and prevent a permanent foreign occupation of Lebanon.
The Great Famine "Silent Massacre"	1915–1918	Mount Lebanon Mutasarrifate	100,000–200,000 (approx. 1/3 of the population).	The general population of Mount Lebanon (predominantly Maronite and Druze)	Ottoman troops	While a natural locust plague occurred, the Ottoman Fourth Army under Jamal Pasha imposed a total land blockade, prohibiting grain from entering the mountain. This was coupled with the requisitioning of local livestock and the cutting of woods for railway fuel. This is remembered in Lebanese collective memory as a deliberate attempt to decimate the population to prevent a pro-French uprising. It led to the massive waves of Lebanese emigration to the Americas and Australia.
Execution of Arab nationalists	May 6, 1916	Beirut (Martyrs' Square)	14	Arab nationalists	(Ottoman Empire) Ottoman Military Tribunal under (Djemal Pasha)	During World War I, Ottoman authorities conducted a series of public summary executions of intellectuals, journalists, and political leaders in central Beirut. These liquidations were intended to suppress the Arab nationalist movement and deter any political cooperation with the Allied powers during the Great Famine. The site was later renamed Martyrs' Square in their honor.

== French Lebanon (1920-1943) ==
Name	Date	Location	Deaths	Victims	Perpetrators	Notes
Ain Ebel massacre	May 5, 1920	Ain Ebel	50–100	(Lebanon) Lebanese Maronite residents	Shia Muslims and pro-Faisal gang	In the chaotic period before the formal declaration of Greater Lebanon, a militia led by Mahmoud Bazzi attacked the Maronite village of Ain Ebel. The assault included the summary execution of non-combatants and was driven by the shifting political allegiances between pro-French Christian communities and pro-Arab/Syrian Shia factions in the south. The town was completely destroyed, with damage done to the two churches, school and convent. This event remains a seminal point of sectarian memory in Southern Lebanon.
Bint Jbeil Christian Expulsion	May 5, 1920	Bint Jbeil	Unknown	(Lebanon) Melkite and Maronite civilians	Shia Muslim irregulars	Simultaneous with the massacre at Ain Ebel, the Christian quarter of Bint Jbeil was overrun. Local irregulars forcibly expelled the resident Christian families, who had lived in the town for generations, to ensure the town could serve as the uncontested political and military capital of the anti-French Jabal Amil revolt.
Kounine Pillage & Executions	May 6, 1920	Kounine, Bint Jbeil District	~2	(Lebanon) Maronite civilians	Shia Muslim irregulars	Immediately following the attack on Ain Ebel, the Christian minority in Kounine was targeted. Militants seized agricultural assets and set fire to several homes to prevent the village from being used as a staging ground by French colonial troops moving from the coast. The incident resulted in the total flight of the Christian population toward the Galilee panhandle.
Ainata Christian Quarter Raid	May 7, 1920	Ainata, Bint Jbeil District	~4	(Lebanon) Maronite civilians	Shia Muslim irregulars	In the immediate aftermath of the fall of Ain Ebel, armed units entered the neighboring village of Ainata. The Christian quarter was targeted for pillaging and several homes were set on fire. The violence prompted an immediate exodus of Christian families toward the coast, a move meant to secure the village as a rear-base for the anti-French insurgency in Bint Jbeil.
Qaouzah Pillage & Executions	May 8, 1920	Qaouzah, Bint Jbeil District	5	(Lebanon) Lebanese Maronite residents	Shia Muslims (Mahmoud Bazzi's Militia)	Following the destruction of Ain Ebel, armed units entered the Maronite village of Qaouzah. The assault involved the systematic looting of homes and the parish church. Most residents fled to the surrounding valleys; five who remained were reportedly executed. This event contributed to the depopulation of the Christian frontier villages during the Jabal Amil revolt.
Srobbin Hamlet Raid	May 9, 1920	Srobbin, Bint Jbeil District	~4	(Lebanon) Maronite civilians	Shia Muslim irregulars (Bazzi Militia)	Serbbine, a small Maronite hamlet near the "Maronite Triangle," was raided shortly after the fall of Ain Ebel. The Bazzi militia targeted the hamlet to prevent it from serving as a lookout point for French patrols. The village was completely pillaged and several residents who failed to flee in time were killed, leading to its total abandonment for the duration of the conflict.
Debel Massacre	May 10, 1920	Debel, Bint Jbeil District	~12+	(Lebanon) Lebanese Maronite residents	Shia Muslims (Mahmoud Bazzi's Militia)	Following the fall of Ain Ebel, Bazzi's forces entered the Maronite village of Debel. The assault involved the summary execution of those unable to flee and the comprehensive looting of the village. This event contributed to the total exodus of the Christian population toward the Galilee panhandle.
Rmaich Massacre 1920	May 11, 1920	Rmaich, Bint Jbeil District	~8+	(Lebanon) Lebanese Maronite residents	Shia Muslims (Mahmoud Bazzi's Militia)	Armed groups reached Rmaich, the largest Maronite village in the sector. While many residents had already evacuated to nearby forests, those who remained were targeted. The village’s granaries and livestock were seized, and several ecclesiastical properties were desecrated. This was the final major village hit before the French counter-offensive began.
Yaroun Christian Expulsion	May 12, 1920	Yaroun, Bint Jbeil District	Unknown	(Lebanon) Lebanese Maronite & Melkite residents	Local Shia Muslim militants	In the village of Yaroun, the Christian quarter was targeted by pro-Faisal irregulars. Christian Residents were forcibly expelled and their properties seized to facilitate the use of the village as a logistics base for the anti-French insurgency. This incident solidified the military control of the Bazzi-led militias over the southern border corridor.
Qoubaiyat Massacre 1920	May 14, 1920	Qoubaiyat, Akkar District	~20–30	(Lebanon) Lebanese Maronite civilians	Sunni Muslims (Pro-Faisal Arab nationalist militias)	Occurring in the same window as the Ain Ebel massacre, this northern event targeted Maronite populations in Akkar who were perceived as supporting the French Mandate. Pro-independence militias associated with the brief Arab Kingdom of Syria carried out summary executions and looting. Historians identify this as the specific event that solidified Maronite support for a French-backed "Greater Lebanon" separated from the Syrian hinterland.
Boutmeh Pillage and Expulsion	May 14, 1920	Boutmeh, Jezzine District	Unknown	(Lebanon) Maronite civilians	Shia Muslim irregulars	During the northward expansion of the Jabal Amil uprising, the Christian families of the village of Boutme were targeted. Irregular forces seized livestock and grain stores, forcing a total exodus of the Christian population toward Jezzine. This raid was part of the effort to sever communication lines between the southern Maronite enclaves and the central mountains.
Naqoura Displacement	May 14, 1920	Naqoura, Tyre District	Unknown	(Lebanon) Melkite and Maronite civilians	Shia Muslim militants	Militants from the Bazzi and Khanjar networks targeted the strategic coastal settlement of Naqoura. The goal was to dismantle French telegraphic links and observation posts. The small Catholic community was harassed into flight, with many taking refuge in small boats or crossing the border into the British Mandate for Palestine.
Alma al-Chaab Pillage & Executions	May 15, 1920	Alma al-Chaab, Tyre District	~7	(Lebanon) Lebanese Maronite civilians	Shia Muslim and tribal irregulars	Armed units operating in the western border sector targeted the Maronite village of Alma al-Chaab. The village was subjected to heavy pillaging and the seizure of livestock. Approximately seven residents were killed during the defense of the village, and the majority of the population fled toward the coast of Tyre to seek French naval protection.
Yarin Pillage & Executions	May 15, 1920	Yarin, Tyre District	~3	(Lebanon) Lebanese Maronite civilians	Shia Muslim and tribal irregulars	During the general collapse of security in the Tyre hinterland, the village of Yarin was raided by irregular forces. The incident involved the systematic looting of granaries and homes. The attack was part of a broader effort to clear the "frontier" of elements perceived as sympathetic to the French Mandate.
Kherbet Selem Christian Expulsion	May 15, 1920	Kherbet Selem, Bint Jbeil District	Unknown	(Lebanon) Melkite and Maronite civilians	Shia Muslim irregulars	The Christians in Kherbet Selem was forcibly expelled as local pro-Faisal committees sought to consolidate military control over the central heights of the Bint Jbeil district. Homes were looted and repurposed as barracks for the insurgency, effectively ending the historical mixed character of the village.
Tibnin Property Seizure & Expulsion	May 15, 1920	Tibnin, Bint Jbeil District	Unknown	(Lebanon) Melkite and Maronite civilians	Shia Muslim irregulars/ militants	As the Bazzi-led militias consolidated control over the district, the Christian community in Tibnin was subjected to systematic harassment and the seizure of property. While a total massacre was avoided due to the intervention of some local Shia notables, the majority of the Melkite and Maronite families abandoned the town, fleeing toward Tyre as French authority collapsed in the interior.
Deir Mimas Raid 1920	May 16, 1920	Deir Mimas, Marjayoun District	~2+	(Lebanon) Lebanese Greek Orthodox Christians (civilians)	Shia Muslim irregulars	As the revolt spread toward the Litani River, the historically Christian village of Deir Mimas was raided. Unlike the Maronite villages to the south, Deir Mimas was primarily Greek Orthodox. The incident involved the pillaging of agricultural stores and the brief displacement of the population toward Marjayoun, as militants sought to secure the strategic heights overlooking the river.
Safad al-Battikh Expulsion	May 18, 1920	Safad al-Battikh, Bint Jbeil District	Unknown	(Lebanon) Maronite and Melkite civilians	Shia Muslim irregulars	In Safad al-Battikh, the Christian population was targeted for expulsion during the height of the Jabal Amil uprising. Their properties were seized or damaged to prevent their return, a move aimed at homogenizing the sectarian makeup of the Bint Jbeil hinterland during the conflict with French mandatory forces.
Deir Kifa and Deir Siryan Destruction	May 20, 1920	Deir Kifa and Deir Siryan, Tyre District	Unknown	(Lebanon) Maronite civilians	Shia Muslim irregulars	As French columns began their counter-offensive, retreating militia units engaged in a scorched earth policy in the villages of Deir Kifa and Deir Syrian. While most residents had already fled, the villages' churches and stone dwellings were systematically demolished or burned to the ground, marking the permanent end of a Christian presence in these specific border settlements.
Mishmish Massacre and Pillage	May 22, 1920	Mishmish, Akkar District	~6	(Lebanon) Maronite civilians	Sunni Muslim irregulars (Pro-Faisal militias)	As part of the regional uprising in the Akkar highlands, the Maronite village of Mishmish was targeted by local pro-Faisal militias. The attackers sought to displace the Christian population to consolidate control over the mountainous interior. The raid resulted in approximately six deaths and the total pillaging of the village's agricultural infrastructure.
Beit Mellat Siege and Massacre	June 2, 1920	Beit Mellat, Akkar District	~10	(Lebanon) Maronite civilians	Sunni Muslim irregulars	The village was besieged by large groups of armed irregulars from neighboring highland tribes. The attackers viewed the Maronite residents as a vanguard for the French Mandate. After the village's local defenses were overwhelmed, houses were set on fire and a significant portion of the population was forced to flee toward the coastal city of Tripoli.
Battle of Maysalun	July 24, 1920	Maysalun Pass, Anti-Lebanon Mountains	~400 (Syrian) / 42 (French)	Arab Kingdom of Syria (Yusuf al-Azma †)	France (Henri Gouraud)	The decisive military clash that ended the short-lived Arab Kingdom of Syria and inaugurated the French Mandate. Minister of War Yusuf al-Azma led an outgunned force of regulars and volunteers to confront the French advance. The French victory allowed troops to enter Damascus the following day, leading directly to High Commissioner Gouraud's proclamation of the State of Greater Lebanon on 1 September 1920.
Assassination of Fouad Jumblatt	August 6, 1921	Wadi Baaqline / Shouf	1	(Druze) Fouad Jumblatt	(Druze) Shakeeb Wahhab (militant)	The father of Kamal Jumblatt and district governor of the Shouf was assassinated in an ambush. While the perpetrator was a rival Druze militant, the liquidation was deeply political, occurring during a period of intense struggle over the role of the Druze community within the new French Mandate administration. The event triggered a series of retaliatory blood feuds across the mountain.
Execution of the Iron Hand (Al-Yad al-Hadidiya) Leaders	August 1922	Beirut	Multiple	Shia and Arab nationalist activists	French Mandate Military Tribunal	Following the formation of the "Iron Hand" secret society to oppose the Mandate, French authorities conducted a series of raids and summary trials. Several key organizers were executed or died in custody under extrajudicial conditions. This crackdown was a targeted effort to suppress early cross-sectarian resistance to the administrative separation of Lebanon from Syria.
The Execution of the Adham Khanjar Plotters	May 30, 1923	Beirut	1	(Lebanon) Adham Khanjar	French Mandate Military Tribunal	Following an attempted assassination of General Henri Gouraud, the Shia insurgent leader Adham Khanjar was captured and summarily executed by the French authorities. His execution was a high-profile political liquidation intended to signal the end of armed resistance from the southern borderlands against the new Mandate administration.
Great Syrian Revolt	1925 – 1927	Rashaya, Hasbaya, Beqaa Valley & South Lebanon	6,000+ (Rebels) / 2,000+ (French)	Rebels (Druze, Sunni, and Shia factions)	(France) French Mandate authorities	A widespread armed uprising against French colonial rule, sparked by the Druze in Jabal al-Druze that quickly spread to the Rashaya and Hasbaya districts of Lebanon. The conflict saw significant battles in Southern Lebanon and the Beqaa, where local insurgents fought alongside Syrian rebels. Although suppressed by French forces through artillery bombardment and air power, the revolt accelerated political shifts toward constitutional governance in the mandate.
Rashaya revolt massacre	November 1925	Rashaya	Hundreds	Christians	Druze	During the Great Syrian Revolt, the expansion of insurgent forces into Lebanon led to the siege of the Rashaya citadel. Forensically, the event is defined by the destruction of the Christian quarter; Approx. 400 Christian homes were damaged or destroyed during the sectarian friction following the rebel entry into the town.
The Bombardment of Rashaya	November 22, 1925	Rashaya	~400–600	(Lebanon) Christian and Druze residents	French Army / French Mandate Air Force	During the Great Syrian Revolt, which spilled into Southern Lebanon, French forces utilized heavy artillery and aerial bombardment against the town of Rashaya to dislodge Druze insurgents. The extrajudicial nature of the high civilian casualty count was criticized as a punitive "scorched earth" tactic used to deter the local population from supporting the pan-Arab rebellion.
The Suppression of the May Day Riots	May 1, 1931	Beirut	Multiple	(Lebanon) Labor organizers and protesters	French Mandate Gendarmerie	During a period of intense economic hardship, the French Mandate authorities utilized lethal force to break up labor demonstrations in Beirut. The extrajudicial killing of protesters and the subsequent "disappearance" of trade union leaders served to decapitate the burgeoning communist and socialist movements which the French viewed as a conduit for Soviet influence in the Levant.
Suppression of the Bint Jbeil Uprising	1936	Bint Jbeil	Multiple	Shia demonstrators and activists	French Mandate Gendarmerie	During the 1936 labor strikes and nationalist protests across the Levant, French-led security forces opened fire on demonstrators in Bint Jbeil. The lethal suppression was a targeted effort to decapitate the burgeoning labor and independence movements in the South, which the French viewed as a threat to the administrative unity of Greater Lebanon.
Arrest and Liquidation of Independence Leaders (Attempted)	November 11, 1943	Rashaya / Beirut	Multiple (during riots)	(Lebanon) Lebanese nationalist protesters	French Mandate security forces	In a final act of colonial political violence, French authorities arrested the newly elected Lebanese government (including Bishara al-Khuri and Riad al-Solh) and imprisoned them in the Rashaya Citadel. The subsequent lethal suppression of "Independence Day" protests in Beirut resulted in several deaths, marking the final state-sanctioned liquidations before the transition to full sovereignty.
The Execution of the independence protesters in "Place des Canons"	November 12, 1943	Beirut	~ 11	(Lebanon) Student protesters and civilians	French Mandate Senegalese Tirailleurs	Following the arrest of the Lebanese cabinet, massive protests erupted in central Beirut (Martyrs' Square). French colonial troops opened fire on the crowds, targeting student leaders and activists. These final state-sanctioned liquidations occurred just days before the French were forced to release the government and recognize Lebanese sovereignty.
Tripoli student massacre	November 13, 1943	Tripoli	14	(Lebanon) Student protesters	French Mandate Senegalese Tirailleurs	During the height of the independence protests, French tanks and colonial troops (Senegalese Tirailleurs) crushed a peaceful march of students in Tripoli. All 14 victims were under the age of 15. This act of state violence against minors was a pivotal moment that galvanized international and domestic pressure for the French to end the Mandate and release the imprisoned Lebanese cabinet.

== Independence - Pre-Civil War period (1943–1975) ==
Name	Date	Location	Deaths	Victims	Perpetrators	Notes
Tripoli Riots	November 2, 1945	Tripoli	14	(Lebanon) Lebanese Jews	Sunni Muslims	Amidst heightened regional nationalist tensions following the anniversary of the Balfour Declaration, anti-Jewish rioting erupted in the northern port city of Tripoli, occurring concurrently with larger riots in Egypt. Mobs targeted the local Jewish quarter, damaging properties and religious institutions. The violence resulted in the deaths of 14 Lebanese Jews and numerous injuries, effectively accelerating the migration of the city's historic Jewish community to Beirut for safety.
Hula massacre	October 31, 1948	Hula	35–58	Lebanese	Carmeli Brigade, Israel Defense Forces	During the final phase of the 1948 Arab–Israeli War (Operation Hiram), the village of Hula was captured on October 24 by the Carmeli Brigade of the Israel Defense Forces without any resistance. Although Lebanon’s military participation in the war was largely symbolic, defined as a "paltry" force that posed no serious threat, the IDF pushed into Southern Lebanon to secure a strategic buffer. The women and children were expelled, most of the men aged between 15 and 60 were shot. In total between 35 and 58 men were executed in a house which was later blown up on top of them.
Execution of Antun Saadeh	July 8, 1949	Beirut	1	Antun Saadeh	(Lebanon) Lebanese Military Tribunal	Following a failed coup attempt by the Syrian Social Nationalist Party (SSNP), its founder Antun Saadeh was captured, tried in a summary military court, and executed within 24 hours. This state-sanctioned liquidation of a major ideological leader was a defining moment for the early Lebanese Republic, signaling the state's readiness to use lethal judicial measures against internal political threats.
Assassination of Riad Al-Solh	July 17, 1951	Amman, Jordan (Impact in Lebanon)	1	(Lebanon) Prime Minister Riad Al-Solh	Syrian Social Nationalist Party (SSNP) militants	Lebanon's first Prime Minister was assassinated while visiting Jordan in retaliation for the execution of Antun Saadeh two years prior. Though the event occurred abroad, the political violence was a direct result of the Lebanese state's previous liquidation of the SSNP leadership and deeply destabilized the post-independence National Pact system.
Miziara massacre	June 16, 1957	Miziara	30	Douaihy clan	Frangieh clan	Sleiman Frangieh and his followers killed 30 loyalist to the Douaihy family in a church in Miziara. Victims included nuns, priests, women and children.
Assassination of Nasib Al Matni	May 8, 1958	Beirut	1	Pro-Nasserist Nasib Al Matni	(Lebanon) Pro-government militants (alleged)	The assassination of Al Matni, the anti-Chamoun editor of Al Telegraf, served as the trigger for the 1958 Lebanon crisis. Historian William Harris (2012) identifies his death as a targeted political liquidation that transformed civil tension into an armed uprising. His murder mobilized the opposition in Beirut and Tripoli, leading to the collapse of internal security and the subsequent request for US military intervention.
Basta and Tripoli Street Massacres	May 12, 1958	Beirut / Tripoli	~50–100	Pro-opposition and Nasserist protesters	(Lebanon) Lebanese Security Forces and pro-government militias	During the opening weeks of the 1958 Lebanon crisis, state security forces and armed supporters of President Camille Chamoun engaged in lethal street battles with opposition supporters in Beirut's Basta district and Tripoli. The extrajudicial killing of demonstrators by sniper fire and irregular militias served as the catalyst for the subsequent US military intervention (Operation Blue Bat).
Zgharta/Tripoli Clashes	May–June, 1958	Tripoli, Zgharta, North Lebanon	20-40	(Lebanon) Lebanese Christians	Pro-Nasserist Militias, Lebanese Muslims	Armed clashes between pro-government Zgharta-based groups and Tripoli-based opposition forces. While primarily military, the conflict involved localized massacres of non-combatants and "identity-based" abductions along the transit routes.
Tripoli Christian Executions	June, 1958	Tripoli	~20	(Lebanon) Lebanese Christians	Pro-Nasserist Militias, Lebanese Muslims	During the 1958 uprising, opposition (Nasserist) militias targeted Christian residents in several Tripoli neighborhoods. The violence included summary executions and forced displacement of families perceived as loyal to the Chamoun government.
Beirut/Basta Bombings	July – Aug, 1958	Basta & Hamra Beirut	40-60	(Lebanon) Lebanese Christians	Pro-Nasserist Militias, Lebanese Muslims	A series of indiscriminate bombings and small-scale massacres in the Basta and Hamra districts. These attacks were aimed at civilian gathering points to exert political pressure during the deadlock between the Maronite-led government and the United Arab Republic-backed rebels.
Beirut Port Executions	July 16, 1958	Port of Beirut, Beirut	10–15	United Arab Republic backed Opposition supporters	(Lebanon) Lebanese Pro-government militias and security elements	Occurring in the immediate aftermath of the U.S. Marine landing during the 1958 Lebanon crisis, several individuals perceived as supporters of the United Arab Republic-backed opposition were seized from their homes and executed in the Port area. Historians cite this as one of the few instances of systematic extrajudicial liquidation during the 1958 conflict, marking a dark departure from the largely tactical nature of that war.
Assassination of Fouad Haddad	December 19, 1958	Beirut	1	(Lebanon) Fouad Haddad (Journalist)	Unidentified (Linked to opposition militias)	A significant post-war liquidation following the official end of the 1958 Lebanon crisis. Haddad, a prominent columnist for the Kataeb-affiliated newspaper Al-Amal, was kidnapped and executed. His death is cited by historians as a pivotal moment that proved the 1958 political settlement had failed to end sectarian revenge killings, setting a grim precedent for the targeting of intellectuals and journalists during periods of civil unrest.
The Deuxième Bureau Purges	January 3, 1962	Beirut / Mount Lebanon	Multiple	Syrian Social Nationalist Party (SSNP) members and soldiers	(Lebanon) Lebanese Military Intelligence (Deuxième Bureau)	Following a second failed SSNP coup on New Year's Eve, the Lebanese military intelligence (Deuxième Bureau) conducted a nationwide campaign of arrests and interrogations that resulted in several extrajudicial deaths in custody. These liquidations marked the peak of the military's influence over Lebanese domestic politics during the Chehabist era.
SSNP Prison Liquidations	January 1962	Beirut / Military Prisons	Unknown	Syrian Social Nationalist Party (SSNP) detainees	(Lebanon) Deuxième Bureau interrogators	In the weeks following the 1961 coup attempt, thousands of suspects were detained. Reports from the period indicate that several high-ranking SSNP members died under interrogation by the Deuxième Bureau. These extrajudicial deaths in custody were used as a psychological tool to dismantle the party's clandestine network and were a hallmark of the Chehabist "security state" era.
Assassination of Kamel Mrowa	May 16, 1966	Beirut	1	(Lebanon) Kamel Mrowa (Journalist)	(United Arab Republic) Adnan Sultani (Linked to Nasserist/ Egyptian Intelligence)	A high-profile professional liquidation of the editor of the pan-Arab daily Al-Hayat. Mroue was shot in his office by a gunman linked to regional intelligence services. Historians cite this as the moment regional Cold War proxy conflicts effectively ended the "Golden Age" of Lebanese press freedom and introduced extrajudicial silencing into the political mainstream.
1969 Battle of the Souq (Sidon)	April 23, 1969	Sidon, South Governorate	7–12	(Lebanon) Lebanese Internal Security Forces (ISF) & Lebanese Christian & Sunni civilians	(Palestine) Palestinian Fatah & Lebanese National Movement (specifically Nasserist cells)	Often cited as the first violent collapse of state authority, pro-Palestinian demonstrations in Sidon escalated into an armed takeover of the city center. Fatah militants and local Nasserist cells summarily executed several ISF personnel and bystanders who refused to participate in the armed struggle strike. This event directly led to the 1969 Cairo Agreement.
Mhaydseh Massacre	October 26, 1969	Mhaydseh, Rashaya District	4	(Lebanon) Lebanese Christians & Sunni Muslims	(Palestine) Palestinian Fatah	During the October 1969 clashes between the Lebanese Army and Palestinian fedayeen, Fatah units occupied Mhaydseh to secure supply corridors from Syria. Four residents (Sunni and Christian) were summarily executed for alleged cooperation with the Lebanese Intelligence (Deuxième Bureau) as the village became a focal point of the "War of the Villages."
Deir Mimass Massacre	October 28, 1969	Deir Mimass, Marjeyoun District	5	(Lebanon) Lebanese Christians	(Palestine) Palestinian PFLP	As Palestinian factions consolidated their hold on the southern border regions, contemporary reports recorded a summary execution in the Greek Orthodox village of Deir Mimas. Following the collapse of local Gendarmerie control on October 28, 1969, five residents were executed during the initial establishment of a paramilitary presence overlooking the Litani River valley.
Kfeir Massacre	October 30, 1969	Kfeir, Hasbaya District	4	(Lebanon) Lebanese Christians & Druze	(Palestine) Palestinian Fatah	Following the establishment of the "Arkoub" front, Fatah militants conducted a targeted sweep in Kfair. Four residents (Druze and Greek Orthodox) were summarily executed for allegedly providing the Lebanese Armed Forces with coordinates for hidden weapons caches in the foothills of Mount Hermon.
Rachaiya al-Wadi Executions	October 30, 1969	Rachaiya al-Wadi, Rashaya District	3	(Lebanon) Lebanese Gendarmes (ISF) and Lebanese Christian & Druze civilians	Palestine Liberation Organisation	In one of the most significant early challenges to the 1943 National Pact, PLO militants executed three people at a checkpoint in Rachaiya al-Wadi. This incident occurred during the "Battle of the Citadels," where Palestinian forces seized historical state fortifications. Historian Farid el-Khazen notes this as the moment the central government lost military control over the vital inland corridors connecting the Hermon range to the Beqaa Valley.
Deir Mimass Execution	January 2, 1970	Deir Mimass, Marjayoun District	1	(Lebanon) Lebanese Christian (Greek Orthodox)	(Palestine) Palestinian PFLP	In an early instance of "neutrality-breaking" violence, PFLP militants conducted the summary execution of a local Greek Orthodox resident. Historian William Harris identifies this as an attempt to coerce the strategically located border village into providing logistics for the "Joint Forces" and ending local cooperation with the Lebanese Army's border patrols.
Kfar Shouba Massacre	January 12, 1970	Kfar Shouba, Hasbaya District	4	(Lebanon) Sunni Muslims	(Palestine) Palestinian Fatah	Following the expansion of the "Arkoub" logistics network, four Sunni residents—identified as local elders—were summarily executed by Fatah militants. The victims had led a local delegation protesting the placement of heavy weaponry within residential sectors of the village, which had drawn retaliatory fire from across the border.
Araya/Kahale Massacre	March 24–26, 1970	Kahale & Araya, Baabda	10-15	(Lebanon) Lebanese Maronite Christians	Palestine Liberation Organization (PLO), PFLP (Popular Front for the Liberation of Palestine) & Palestinian As-Sa'iqa militants	Palestinians began firing their weapons at the local Christian villagers during a funeral procession for a Palestinian militant (killed in a separate clash) passing through the village of Kahaleh. A firefight erupted that lasted for two days, involving machine guns and grenades.
Houla Massacre 1970	May 5, 1970	Houla, Marjeyoun District	5	(Lebanon) Shia Muslims	(Palestine) Palestinian PFLP	In an instance of border discipline, five Shia residents were summarily executed by PFLP militants. The victims, members of a local village council, had formally protested the use of the village as a launch site for Katyusha rockets, citing the risk of retaliatory strikes on civilian dwellings. This event marked a critical point of friction between the local population and Palestinian paramilitary units in the South.
Kfar Hamam Massacre	May 12, 1970	Kfar Hamam, Hasbaya District	4	(Lebanon) Sunni Muslims	(Palestine) Palestinian Fatah	Following the expansion of the "Arkoub" front, four Sunni residents were summarily executed by Fatah militants. The victims had attempted to prevent the installation of mortar positions near civilian residences, which were intended for cross-border shelling into the Hula Valley.
Kfar Kila Executions	September 5, 1970	Kfar Kila, Marjayoun District	3	Shia Muslims	Palestine Liberation Organization Fatah	During the consolidation of paramilitary control in the border region, three Shia residents were summarily executed by Fatah militants. The victims had led a communal effort to block the placement of heavy weaponry within the village perimeter, citing the risk of retaliatory strikes on the civilian population. This incident highlighted the growing friction between border communities and the expanding "Fath-land" logistics network.
Majdel Balhis Massacre	September 22, 1970	Majdel Balhis, Rashaya District	5	(Lebanon) Lebanese Christians & Sunni Muslims	Palestine Liberation Organization Fatah	In the aftermath of the Black September events in Jordan and the relocation of Palestinian fighters to Lebanon, five residents in the village of Majdel Balhis were summarily executed by Fatah units. The victims were accused of cooperating with the Lebanese Gendarmerie during the consolidation of the "Fatah-land" sectors of the Western Bekaa.
Rmaich Executions	October 20, 1970	Rmaich, Bint Jbeil District	2	(Lebanon) Lebanese Maronite Christians	Palestine Liberation Organization Fatah	Following a village-wide refusal to allow Palestinian rocket crews to operate from local tobacco fields, Fatah militants executed two Maronite residents. This incident is cited as a turning point for the border communities, leading to the formation of local "village guards" and the first requests for direct state protection against the Fatahland administration.
Yaroun Executions	May 14, 1971	Yaroun, Bint Jbeil District	2	(Lebanon) Lebanese Christian & Shia Muslim	(Palestine) Palestinian Fatah	Following the expansion of the Palestinian "Armed Struggle Command" (PASC) administrative role, two residents (one Christian and one Shia) were summarily executed in the mixed village of Yaroun. The victims were targeted for maintaining administrative ties with the local Gendarmerie and resisting the imposition of paramilitary judicial authority over village affairs.
Tall Bireh Massacre	August 2, 1971	Tall Bireh, Akkar District	4	(Lebanon) Lebanese Christians & Sunni Muslims	(Palestine) Palestinian Fatah	In an early instance of paramilitary intervention in Northern Lebanese agrarian disputes, four residents (Sunni and Christian) were summarily executed by Fatah militants. The incident arose from a conflict over irrigation rights, where the faction intervened to override local property claims and traditional mediation by the Internal Security Forces.
Aitaroun Identity Executions	August 11, 1971	Aitaroun, Bint Jbeil District	2	(Lebanon) Lebanese Shia	(Palestine) Palestinian Fatah	Fatah militants summarily executed two local Shia residents following their refusal to vacate agricultural land intended for a guerrilla training base. This incident is noted by historian William Harris as part of the "silent displacement" of southern Lebanese farmers during the early 1970s.
Bint Jbeil Market Day Massacre	August 15, 1971	Bint Jbeil, Bint Jbeil District	4	(Lebanon) Lebanese Shia	(Palestine) Palestinian PFLP	In an early instance of public summary execution to enforce civilian compliance, four Shia merchants were killed in the Bint Jbeil market square by PFLP militants. The incident followed a dispute over the mandatory payment of "protection fees" and revolutionary taxes levied by Palestinian factions on local commercial activity in South Lebanon.
Beit Mellat Executions	September 12, 1971	Beit Mellat, Akkar District	3	(Lebanon) Lebanese Maronite Christians	Lebanese National Movement (specifically local pro-Syrian / Palestinian cells)	In an early precursor to the displacement of the Akkar Christian population, local leftist militants executed three residents of Beit Mellat. The victims were involved in state-recognized agricultural committees that had resisted the efforts of Palestinian-backed factions to collect "revolutionary taxes" from local farmers.
Majdel Selm Massacre	November 3, 1971	Majdel Selm, Marjayoun District	4	(Lebanon) Lebanese Shia	(Palestine) Palestinian Fatah	Following the expansion of the "Arkoub" logistics network into the central sector, four Shia residents were summarily executed by Fatah militants. The incident arose from a dispute over the requisitioning of village agricultural land for the construction of fortified supply bunkers and ammunition depots near civilian infrastructure.
Yanta Route Massacre	November 5, 1971	Yanta, Rashaya District	5	(Lebanon) Lebanese Christians & Druze	(Palestine) Palestinian Fatah	Following the securing of strategic supply lines from Syria, five residents (Druze and Christian) were summarily executed by Fatah militants. The incident followed a dispute regarding the requisitioning of village lands for weapons transit and the construction of storage depots along the border heights.
Ain Ebel Executions	June 10, 1972	Ain Ebel, Bint Jbeil District	2	(Lebanon) Lebanese Maronite Christians	(Palestine) Palestinian PFLP	In an effort to dismantle local intelligence networks, two Maronite residents were summarily executed by PFLP militants on charges of cooperation with the Lebanese Armed Forces Intelligence (Deuxième Bureau). The incident was part of a broader campaign to prevent the reporting of paramilitary logistics and heavy weaponry movements within the village's strategic border perimeter.
Rmaich Massacre	June 21, 1972	Rmaich, Bint Jbeil District	5	(Lebanon) Lebanese Maronite Christians	Palestinian PFLP (Popular Front for the Liberation of Palestine) & DFLP (Democratic Front for the Liberation of Palestine)	In a documented instance of "military zone" enforcement, five Maronite residents were summarily executed by PFLP and DFLP units in the village hinterlands. The victims were intercepted while attempting to access agricultural lands within a newly designated paramilitary sector. The incident served to enforce demographic and movement control over the strategic border heights during the escalation of the "War of the Villages."
Bar Elias Massacre	July 14, 1972	Bar Elias, Zahle District	4	(Lebanon) Lebanese Sunni Muslims	(Palestine) Palestinian As-Sa'iqa	In an early instance of "transit-control" violence, Syrian-backed As-Sa'iqa units executed 4 local Sunni residents in Bar Elias. The victims were killed during a dispute regarding the faction's efforts to establish a permanent checkpoint and barracks within the town, which local leaders argued violated the civil rights of the residents and obstructed local trade.
Majdel Anjar Roadblock Massacre	August 11, 1972	Majdel Anjar, Zahle District	3	(Lebanon) Lebanese Sunni Muslims	(Palestine) Palestinian As-Sa'iqa	Syrian-backed As-Sa'iqa units established an unauthorized checkpoint on the Beirut–Damascus highway in Majdel Anjar. Three local Sunni residents were summarily executed following a dispute over the faction's imposition of "transit taxes" on commercial freight crossing the Beqaa Valley. This incident is recorded as a key early conflict over the control of Lebanon's primary economic transit corridors.
Shatila Dissident Purge	September 14, 1972	Shatila Camp, Beirut	5	Palestinian and Lebanese (LNM-affiliated) militants	(Palestine) Palestinian Fatah	In an early instance of intra-factional purges, Fatah's security apparatus executed five members (Palestinian and Lebanese) accused of "deviationism" and cooperation with the Lebanese Deuxième Bureau. The incident demonstrated the extrajudicial authority established within the camps following the Cairo Accord, which effectively suspended the jurisdiction of Lebanese law enforcement within camp perimeters.
Kfar Zabad Executions	October 5, 1972	Kfar Zabad, Zahle District	2	(Lebanon) Lebanese Sunni Muslims	(Palestine) Palestinian PFLP-GC	In a move to secure trans-border supply lines, two Sunni residents were summarily executed by PFLP-GC militants near the Syrian border. The victims were accused of cooperation with Lebanese Customs and the Army's Deuxième Bureau to monitor unauthorized arms shipments entering the Beqaa Valley. The incident demonstrated the faction's efforts to dismantle state border surveillance through lethal intimidation of local frontier communities.
Aitaroun Massacre	October 14, 1972	Aitaroun, Bint Jbeil District	8	(Lebanon) Lebanese Shia civilians	Palestinian PFLP (Popular Front for the Liberation of Palestine) & DFLP (Democratic Front for the Liberation of Palestine)	Following a prolonged dispute over the installation of heavy weaponry and military bunkers within the village perimeter, PFLP and DFLP militants conducted a targeted security sweep. Eight Shia residents, identified as leaders of a local committee opposing the paramilitary presence, were summarily executed. This event is cited as a major escalation in the friction between southern border communities and the radical factions of the "Armed Struggle."
1973 PLO Conflict	May 2–18, 1973	Beirut South Lebanon	300+ killed & 700+ wounded	(Lebanon) Lebanese Army	Palestine Liberation Organization (PLO), PFLP-GC Popular Front for the Liberation of Palestine & DFLP Democratic Front for the Liberation of Palestine	Triggered by the May 1 abduction of Lebanese Army personnel by PFLP-GC militants, the conflict saw the Lebanese Army engage in defensive operations to restore state sovereignty. For the first time, the Lebanese Air Force deployed Hawker Hunter jets against paramilitary positions in the Bourj el-Barajneh and Shatila camps after the Army was targeted by heavy urban insurgency. The conflict concluded with the Melkart Protocol, a state-mandated effort to re-regulate the 1969 Cairo Agreement and secure the release of kidnapped soldiers.
Mieh Mieh Massacre	May 10, 1973	Mieh Mieh, Sidon District	3	(Lebanon) Lebanese Melkite Christians	(Palestine) Palestinian PFLP	During the 1973 Lebanese clashes between the Lebanese Army and Palestinian factions, three Melkite Christian residents were summarily executed by PFLP militants. The victims were targeted following the deployment of Lebanese Army units in the hills overlooking Sidon, with the executions intended to deter local civilian cooperation with state military operations during the siege of the nearby camps.
Nabatieh Market Purge	May 19, 1973	Nabatieh, Nabatieh District	6	(Lebanon) Lebanese Shia	(Palestine) Palestinian PFLP	In a targeted political purge following the 1973 Lebanese clashes, six Shia merchants were summarily executed in the Nabatieh market square by PFLP militants. The victims were accused of providing the Internal Security Forces and Lebanese military intelligence with the coordinates of underground bunkers and supply caches located in the Nabatieh hinterland.
Aita al-Shaab Massacre	May 22, 1973	Aita al-Shaab, Bint Jbeil District	4	(Lebanon) Lebanese Shia	(Palestine) Palestinian PFLP	During the final phase of the 1973 Lebanese clashes, four Shia residents were summarily executed by PFLP militants during a "security sweep" of the border heights. The victims were accused of maintaining contact with the Lebanese Armed Forces Deuxième Bureau and providing intelligence on the location of newly established artillery positions along the village perimeter.
Dekwaneh Massacre 1973	July 12, 1973	Dekwaneh, Matn District	3	(Lebanon) Lebanese Maronite Christians	(Palestine) Palestinian PFLP-GC elements within the Lebanese National Movement	Predating the 1974–76 siege of Tall el-Zaatar, three Maronite civilians were summarily executed by PFLP-GC militants after being intercepted at a paramilitary checkpoint near the camp perimeter. The incident, documented as an enforcement of "No-Go Zones" around Palestinian military infrastructure, served as a primary catalyst for the early mobilization and fortification of the surrounding Christian residential sectors.
Deir el-Ahmar Road Massacre	September 14, 1973	Deir el-Ahmar, Baalbek District	6	(Lebanon) Lebanese Maronite Christians	(Palestine) Palestinians & Lebanese National Movement	Two years prior to the outbreak of the civil war, a roadblock established on the approach to the Christian enclave of Deir el-Ahmar resulted in the summary execution of six Maronite civilians. The incident is cited by historians as a key early indicator of the deteriorating security environment in the Northern Beqaa Valley and the emergence of "identity card" violence used to enforce territorial boundaries.
Masnaa Border Post Massacre	April 5, 1974	Masnaa, Beqaa	7	(Lebanon) Lebanese Christians	(Palestine) Palestinian As-Sa'iqa	In a significant escalation of "identity card" violence along Lebanon's primary international transit route, seven Christian travelers were summarily executed by Syrian-backed Palestinian As-Sa'iqa militants. The incident occurred at an unauthorized checkpoint established near the Syrian border crossing, where the faction exerted extrajudicial control over movement between Beirut and Damascus. Historians cite this event as a critical precursor to the systematic sectarian filtration that characterized the later breakdown of civil order.
Dekwaneh Massacre April 1974	April 13, 1974	Dekwaneh	20	(Lebanon) Lebanese Maronite Christians	Palestine Liberation Organization (PLO) PFLP (Popular Front for the Liberation of Palestine)	Palestinian fighters from the nearby Tel al-Zaatar camp launched an assault on the Dekwaneh town center. The attack involved shelling residential buildings and direct fire into the streets.
Yaroun Massacre	May 19, 1974	Yaroun, Bint Jbeil District	6	(Lebanon) Lebanese Christians	Palestinian PFLP (Popular Front for the Liberation of Palestine) & DFLP (Democratic Front for the Liberation of Palestine)	Predating the official outbreak of the civil war, six Christian residents were summarily executed by PFLP and DFLP militants in the mixed border village of Yaroun. The incident was part of a systematic campaign to suppress local communal opposition to the installation of heavy weaponry and the establishment of "No-Go Zones" within the village's agricultural hinterlands. Historians cite this as a definitive moment in the collapse of civilian-paramilitary relations in the Bint Jbeil District.
Rachaiya el-Foukhar Massacre	June 15, 1974	Rashaya al-Foukhar, Hasbaya District	7	(Lebanon) Lebanese Christians (Greek Orthodox)	Palestinian PFLP (Popular Front for the Liberation of Palestine) & Fatah	During the strategic consolidation of the "Arkoub" region, seven residents were summarily executed by Fatah and PFLP militants in Rachaiya el-Foukhar. The victims were targeted for their leadership in a communal movement opposing the requisitioning of village property and for maintaining administrative ties with the Lebanese Armed Forces. This incident is recorded by historians as a significant step in the total neutralization of state authority within the "Fatahland" logistics sector.
1974 Dekwaneh Reprisals	July 1, 1974	Dekwaneh, Mount Lebanon Governorate	10–15	(Lebanon) Lebanese civilians and (Palestine) PLO militants	(Palestine) PLO (instigators) and (Lebanon) Kataeb/NLP (retaliatory)	A violent escalation triggered by the PLO's systemic use of the Tel al-Zaatar camp as a base for kidnapping and extrajudicial executions of residents from the neighboring Dekwaneh district. After months of PLO provocations aimed at expanding their "state-within-a-state" into the Christian heartland, local Kataeb and NLP volunteers launched a counter-offensive to secure the town. The resulting confrontation involved summary liquidations on both sides, marking the first time the PLO’s campaign of extrajudicial violence moved directly into metropolitan Beirut, forcing local communities into armed self-defense.
Chtoura Roadblock Massacre	July 29, 1974	Chtoura, Zahle District	6	(Lebanon) Lebanese Christians	(Palestine) Palestinian As-Sa'iqa militia (Syrian controlled)	In a significant expansion of "identity card" violence at Lebanon's primary transit hub, six Christian civilians were summarily executed by Syrian-controlled Palestinian As-Sa'iqa militants. The victims were intercepted at an unauthorized roadblock established at the Chtoura junction on the Beirut–Damascus highway. Historians identify this event as a definitive escalation in the use of paramilitary checkpoints to enforce sectarian territoriality and neutralize state control over strategic transport corridors.
Dekwaneh Executions July 1974	July 29, 1974	Dekwaneh, Matn District	4	(Lebanon) Lebanese Maronite Christians	Palestine Liberation Organisation (PLO)	Following a dispute over a roadblock established outside the Tel al-Zaatar refugee camp, Palestinian militants executed four Maronite commuters. Historian William Harris identifies this 1974 event as a decisive moment that forced the central government to admit its inability to police the camps' perimeter, leading directly to the expansion of militia-led checkpoints in East Beirut.
Tell Amara Massacre	August 20, 1974	Tell Amara, Zahle District	5	(Lebanon) Lebanese Maronite Christians	(Palestine) Palestinian As-Sa'iqa militia	In a documented instance of paramilitary intervention in local land disputes, five Maronite civilians were summarily executed at an agricultural estate in Tell Amara by Syrian-backed Palestinian As-Sa'iqa militants. The incident is cited by historians as part of a broader 1974 pattern where non-state actors used lethal force to settle property claims and assert political dominance over the central Beqaa Valley's agricultural infrastructure.
Khirbet Char Massacre 1974	September 18, 1974	Khirbet Char, Akkar District	5	(Lebanon) Lebanese Maronite Christians	Lebanese National Movement (specifically pro-Palestinian cells)	Seven months prior to the outbreak of the civil war, five Maronite residents belonging to local prominent families were summarily executed in the Akkar village of Khirbet Char by LNM-affiliated pro-Palestinian militants. The incident is identified by historians as part of a systematic campaign to dismantle traditional political and land-owning authority in the northern border regions, replacing state-aligned local leadership with revolutionary councils.
Chekka Roadblock Massacre	October 18, 1974	Chekka, Batroun District	6	(Lebanon) Lebanese Maronite Christians	(Palestine) Palestinians & Lebanese National Movement	Six months before the official start of the civil war, a roadblock on the main northern coastal highway resulted in the summary execution of 6 Maronite Christian civilians. Historian William Harris identifies this as an early expansion of sectarian "identity card" violence into Northern Lebanon, targeting travelers moving between Tripoli and Beirut.
Aishiyeh-Rihan Roadblock Executions	October 17, 1974	Aishiyeh, Jezzine District	4	(Lebanon) Maronite civilians and state travelers	Palestine Liberation Organisation	In one of the earliest documented "identity" killings of the 1970s, Palestinian militants established a flying roadblock between Aishiyeh and Rihan, executing four travelers based on their religious affiliation. This event is cited by Harris as the catalyst for the permanent "roadblock culture" that effectively partitioned southern Lebanon months before the official outbreak of the war.
Aishiyeh Massacre 1974	October 21, 1974	Aishiyeh, Jezzine District	~15	(Lebanon) Maronite civilians	(Palestine) Saika and PLO irregulars	Months before the official outbreak of the Civil War, members of the pro-Syrian Saika militia and other Palestinian factions launched a raid on the village of Aishiyeh. The attackers targeted local homes and the village church, resulting in the deaths of approximately 15 civilians. The incident is cited as one of the early catalysts for the mobilization of Christian village defense units in the South.
Akkar political violence 1974	November, 1974	Akkar District		(Lebanon) Lebanese Christians	Lebanese National Movement	By late 1974, escalating security issues in the region were accompanied by local factions in al-Fnaydeq challenging the authority of traditional political elites in Akkar.
Chiyah Identity Executions	November 22, 1974	Chiyah, Baabda District	4	(Lebanon) Lebanese Maronite Christians	Lebanese National Movement (local Shi'a elements)	Five months before the official start of the civil war, a precursor to the "identity card" killings occurred in Chiyah. Four Maronite residents from the neighboring Ain al-Remmaneh were intercepted and executed by local LNM units. This event is cited by historian William Harris as a critical moment that led to the permanent fortification of the neighborhood borders in East Beirut.
Zgharta-Tripoli Roadblock Massacre 1974	December 10, 1974	Tripoli / Zgharta Road	7	(Lebanon) Lebanese Maronite Christians	Lebanese National Movement	In a major escalation of northern tensions four months prior to the civil war, Tripoli-based LNM units established unauthorized roadblocks on the primary transit route to Zgharta. Seven Maronite Christian civilians were summarily executed after being identified by their religious affiliation. Historians cite this event as the first systematic use of "identity card" killings in North Lebanon, which subsequently triggered a protracted cycle of retaliatory kidnappings and communal mobilization between the two cities.
Tyre Port Massacre	December 18, 1974	Tyre, South Governorate	3	(Lebanon) Lebanese Internal Security Forces and Customs Officials	Palestine Liberation Organisation	Palestinian port-control units in Tyre summarily executed three Lebanese state officials after they attempted to inspect cargo manifests and collect customs duties on behalf of the central government. Historian William Harris identifies this as a decisive blow to state sovereignty, as it marked the effective transfer of administrative and economic control over the southern maritime borders to the PLO.
Kfar Shuba Identity Executions	January 11, 1975	Kfar Shuba, Hasbaya District	~3–5	(Lebanon) Lebanese civilians (suspected state loyalists)	Palestine Liberation Organisation & Lebanese National Movement	Following Israeli raids on the border, local Palestinian-LNM units conducted a series of summary executions of residents accused of providing intelligence to the state or the IDF. Historian William Harris identifies this as part of the "militia-ization" of the south, where state judicial authority was replaced by revolutionary tribunals. This event is cited in transitional justice mappings as a key precursor to the total loss of sovereignty in the "Fatah-land" region.
Ain el-Remmaneh Executions Jan 1975	January 15, 1975	Ain El Remmaneh / Chiyah Border	3	(Lebanon) Lebanese Maronite Christians	Lebanese National Movement	Three months before the start of the war, local LNM militants conducted a summary execution of three Maronite residents near the Chiyah border following a sniping incident. This event is cited by historian William Harris as the final catalyst for the "closed-door" defense policy adopted by the Kataeb Party in East Beirut, directly setting the stage for the April 13 clashes.
Dekwaneh/Tel al-Zaatar Perimeter Executions	January 22, 1975	Dekwaneh / Tel al-Zaatar Perimeter, Matn District	4	(Lebanon) Lebanese Maronite Christians	Palestine Liberation Organisation (specifically PFLP/DFLP cells within the camp)	Three months before the official outbreak of the war, Palestinian militants from the Tel al-Zaatar camp intercepted and summarily executed four Maronite laborers near the Dekwaneh industrial zone. Historian William Harris identifies this incident as the "point of total distrust" that led to the permanent fortification of the East Beirut camp perimeters.
Ghazir Massacre	February 11, 1975	Ghazir, Keserwan District	5	(Lebanon) Lebanese Christians	(Palestine) Palestinians & Lebanese National Movement	Two months before the Ain el-Remmaneh church shooting, historian William Harris documents a targeted attack in Ghazir where 5 civilians were executed in a localized sectarian clash, signaling the breakdown of the 1970 Cairo Agreement.
Sidon Fishermen Clashes	February 26 – March 3, 1975	Sidon, South Lebanon	~20–24	(Lebanon) Lebanese Army soldiers, Lebanese Christian & Sunni Muslim civilians	Palestine Liberation Organisation & Lebanese National Movement	Triggered by the shooting of Marouf Saad, the "Battle of Sidon" evolved from a protest into a multi-sectarian conflict. While the Army engaged Palestinian-Leftist forces, the ICTJ and Harris document that local Christian civilians in Sidon's mixed neighborhoods were subjected to summary executions and "identity" abductions. This event effectively ended Sidon's status as a mixed-sectarian haven and signaled the impending total collapse of the state.
Khalde/Ouzai Road Checkpoint Massacre	March 26, 1975	Khalde / Ouzai road, Baabda District	5	(Lebanon) Lebanese Christians	Palestinian PFLP (Popular Front for the Liberation of Palestine)	Less than three weeks prior to the official outbreak of the civil war, five Christian travelers were summarily executed by PFLP militants at an unauthorized roadblock on the southern approach to Beirut. The incident, occurring on the strategic coastal road, is identified by historians as a critical escalation in "identity card" violence and a definitive signal of the collapse of state security control over the capital's primary transit corridors.
Maalaka Massacre	March 28, 1975	Maalaka, Zahle District	5	(Lebanon) Lebanese Maronite Christians	(Palestine) Palestinian As-Sa'iqa	In a significant precursor to the April 13 escalation, Syrian-backed Palestinian As-Sa'iqa militants established a temporary roadblock in Maalaka. Five Maronite civilians traveling toward Zahle were intercepted and executed. Historian Farid el-Khazen identifies this as a critical "point of no return" for the Christian community in the Beqaa, leading to the mobilization of local Phalangist militias.

== Civil War period (1975-1990) ==
Name	Date	Location	Deaths	Victims	Perpetrators	Notes
Church shooting	April 13, 1975	Ain El Remmaneh, Beirut	4	(Lebanon) Lebanese Christians	Palestine Liberation Organization ( (Popular Front for the Liberation of Palestine) PFLP)	Drive-by shooting assassination attempt on Pierre Gemayel outside a church ceremony. Gemayel survived but four men were killed.
Bus massacre	April 13, 1975	Ain El Remmaneh, Beirut	27	(Palestine Liberation Organization) PLO	Kataeb Party	On the morning of 13 April 1975, PLO gunmen in a speeding car fired on a church in the Christian East Beirut suburb of Ain el-Rummaneh, killing four people, including two Maronite Phalangists. Hours later, 27 Palestinian civilians traveling in a bus through one of the Ain el Rummaneh neighborhoods of Beirut were attacked and killed by Christian Phalangists. Many more people were killed in subsequent fighting in other areas of the city later that day. Together, these incidents have been identified by several historians as the starting point of the Lebanese Civil War.
Black Thursday Massacre	May 30, 1975	Bachoura, Beirut (Barbe District)	30–50	(Lebanon) Lebanese Christians	(Palestine) Palestinian As-Sa'iqa and PLO	Considered the first "identity card" massacre of the conflict. Approximately 30–50 Christian civilians were intercepted at a checkpoint in the Barbe neighborhood. Victims were summarily executed and their bodies abandoned in the local cemetery near the Green Line. Forensic reports noted widespread mutilation, intended to send a sectarian message. This event is cited as the primary catalyst for the permanent fortification of the East-West Beirut divide
Qa'a Massacre 1975	July 7, 1975	Qaa, Beqaa Governorate	7	(Lebanon) Lebanese Christians	(Palestine) Palestinians and Lebanese Shia Muslims	Location: Qa’a, Northern Beqaa. Aggressors: Local Shi’a tribesmen and Palestinian As-Sa`iqa militants. Casualties: 7 civilian fatalities. Significance: This attack marked the definitive start of Christian flight from the area.
Zahle Massacre	August 24, 1975	Zahle	26	(Lebanon) Lebanese Christians	(Palestine) Palestinians and Lebanese Shia Muslims	Trigger Events: The death of a Syrian individual from Saadnayel and an armed clash between local Shia/Palestinian As-Saiqa forces and the Lebanese Army. Escalation: The skirmish transformed into a full-scale sectarian conflict between Muslim and Christian groups within the city and its suburbs. Tactics: The use of heavy weaponry, including rockets and machine guns, as well as systematic "identity-based" abductions and summary executions. Casualties: 26 deaths.
Haouch El-Omara Massacre	August 28, 1975	Haouch El-Omara, Zahle	3	(Lebanon) Lebanese Christians	(Palestine) Palestinians and Lebanese Shia Muslims	Location: Haouch El-Omara (a suburb of Zahleh) and the primary transit road connecting Chtaura to Baalbeck. Casualties: 3 individuals killed and 9 others wounded. Primary Perpetrators: Identified as As-Sa'iqa (a pro-Syrian Palestinian Ba'athist militia) and local allied Shia gunmen.
Saadnayel Massacre	August 28–29, 1975	Saadnayel, Zahle	13	(Lebanon) Lebanese Christians	(Palestine) Palestinians and Lebanese Shia Muslims	Discovery: Three victims found in a vehicle within the predominantly Muslim town of Saadnayel. Cause of Death: Targeted gunfire (shot in the heart). Route: The victims were intercepted while traveling on the Zahleh-Tarchich-Baskinta road, a strategic link connecting the Beqaa Valley to the Mount Lebanon region. Intensity: A total of 13 fatalities were recorded over the two-day span, reflecting the rapid escalation of sectarian violence in the area.
Zahle Massacre	August 30–31, 1975	Zahle	24	(Lebanon) Lebanese Christians	(Palestine) Palestinians and Lebanese Shia Muslims	A 48-hour period of intense violence resulting in 24 deaths. Perpetrators: Shia Militants from neighboring Muslim villages allied with Palestinian As-Sa'iqa commandos.
Deir Jannine Massacre 1975	August 30, 1975	Deir Jannine, Akkar District	12	(Lebanon) Lebanese Maronite Christians	(Palestine Liberation Organization) PLO and LNM	Often cited as one of the very first cleansing operations in the North. Palestinian and Leftist militants overran this Maronite village in the Akkar hinterland, executing 12 civilians. This event predates the official "Two-Year War" escalation and was a primary factor in the Christian flight from the Akkar periphery toward Zgharta and Batroun.
Taalabaya Massacre	September 1, 1975	Taalabaya, Zahle	11	(Lebanon) Lebanese Christians	(Palestine) Palestinians and Lebanese Shia Muslims	Target: A Christian-owned mill in Taalabaya, a town strategically located in the Beqaa Valley. The Abduction: A group of gunmen seized the owner and his five children. The Aftermath: Discovery of 11 victims in total, confirming the systematic execution of at least three of the miller's sons. The Survivor’s Testimony: The miller, released a year later, provided harrowing evidence of torture and physical mutilation.
Beit Mellat Massacre	September 10, 1975	Beit Mellat, Akkar	15–25	(Lebanon) Lebanese Christians	(Palestine) Palestinian As-Sa'iqa (Syrian backed) and Lebanese National Movement	Joint Forces militants, specifically the Syrian-controlled Palestinian As-Sa'iqa and local LNM units, entered the village and executed civilians in the town square. Between five and eight civilians were killed, and ten more disappeared. Also, the militiamen burned down homes and the church, and stole several cars.
Deir Ashash Massacre	September 11, 1975	Deir Ashash, Zgharta	3	(Lebanon) Lebanese Christians	(Palestine) Palestinian As-Sa'iqa and Lebanese Sunni Muslims LNM	Militants from the Syrian-backed Palestinian As-Sa'iqa and local LNM units executed three elderly priests (aged 60, 87, and 93) at the Deir Ashash monastery. This event is cited as a major catalyst for the escalation of the war in North Lebanon.
Akkar District September 1975	September, 1975	Akkar District		(Lebanon) Maronite civilians	Lebanese National Movement (specifically local pro-LNM irregulars)	In September 1975, renewed fighting across Northern Lebanon and the Akkar district led to initial population movements south toward coastal Christian enclaves, including the Kesrouan region.
Beirut Justice Palace Liquidation	September 18, 1975	Beirut, Justice Palace District	5	(Lebanon) Judicial officials and civil servants	(Palestine Liberation Organization) PLO and Lebanese National Movement	A targeted professional liquidation during the "Second Round" of the Beirut conflict. Five senior judicial figures and civil servants were executed to paralyze the state's legal apparatus. This event is cited by historian Khazen as the definitive moment where "street justice" replaced the rule of law in the capital, marking the collapse of the state's central authority.
Tel Abbas Massacre 1975	October 9, 1975	Tel Abbas el Gharby, Akkar	15	(Lebanon) Lebanese Christians (Greek Orthodox)	Palestine Liberation Organization Palestinian PFLP & Lebanese National Movement / Lebanese Muslims	Palestinian and Leftist militants entered the village, opening fire on civilians inside the local church. 15 were killed and 9 kidnapped. The attack resulted in the destruction of the church and 40 homes. This event, occurring after the Deir Ashash massacre, forced the total migration of the local Christian population toward the Syrian border and the Christian heartlands.
Fanar Road Massacre	October 24–25, 1975	Fanar, Matn District	18	(Lebanon) Lebanese Christians	(Palestine) Palestinian Fatah & Lebanese National Movement	During the heavy fighting for control of the Beirut-Matn road, Palestinian-backed LNM militias established a major roadblock in Fanar. The ICTJ report identifies the summary execution of 18 Christian civilians who were pulled from their vehicles while attempting to enter the city.
Murr Tower (Burj al-Murr) Executions	October 24, 1975–October 13, 1990	Beirut Central District, Beirut	~17,000	(Lebanon) Lebanese Christian & other civilian captives	Al-Mourabitoun, Amal, PSP, and Syrian Intelligence	The Murr Tower served as the primary urban site for the enforced disappearance and summary execution of civilians. Throughout its occupation by the Al-Mourabitoun (1975–76) and later the Amal/PSP alliance (post-1984), it functioned as a "snatching" hub where victims were interrogated and often executed by being thrown from the top floors. The figure of 17,000 represents the total number of Lebanese who disappeared during the war, many of whom were processed through sites like the Tower and the Syrian-run Beau Rivage.
Na'ameh Coastal Road Massacre	October 28–30, 1975	Na'ameh, Chouf District	~15	(Lebanon) Christian & Shia civilians	(Palestine) Palestinian PFLP & DFLP	During the effort to secure the strategic Beirut-Sidon coastal road, Palestinian units established checkpoints in Na'ameh. The ICTJ documents the summary execution of approximately 15 individuals, including local residents and travelers, as the "Joint Forces" consolidated control over the southern transit corridor.
Dekwaneh Massacre 1975	November 12, 1975	Dekwaneh, Matn District	20	(Lebanon) Lebanese Christians	(Palestine) Palestinian Fatah & As-Sa'iqa	During the heavy fighting for control of the Beirut suburbs and industrial zones, Palestinian units overran residential blocks in Dekwaneh. Historian William Harris identifies the summary execution of 20 civilians as forces pushed toward the "Green Line" in the weeks preceding Black Saturday.
Chiah - Ain El-Remmaneh Massacre	November 12, 1975	Chiah / Ain El Remmaneh border, Beirut	14	(Lebanon) Lebanese Christians	(Palestine) Palestinian Fatah & Lebanese National Movement	In the days immediately preceding Black Saturday, sectarian clearing operations occurred along the Chiah-Ain el-Remmaneh front. The ICTJ report documents the summary execution of 14 civilians caught in the buffer zone between the warring districts.
Saghbine Massacre	November 25, 1975	Saghbine, Western Beqaa District	12	(Lebanon) Lebanese Christian civilians	Palestine Liberation Organisation and Lebanese National Movement	During the early phases of the "Two-Year War," Joint Forces units launched an assault on the Christian village of Saghbine to secure the transit corridors of the Western Beqaa. Twelve civilians were summarily executed during the capture of the village. Regional mappings by the ICTJ describe such operations as a strategic effort to dismantle Christian pockets that could potentially coordinate with the Lebanese Army or the Maronite militias in the Zahle region.
Black Saturday	December 6, 1975	Beirut	300–350	Muslims, Druze	Kataeb Regulatory Forces	Four young Christian Phalangists were assassinated on the Fanar (Matn) road in Beirut. In retaliation, Phalangists murdered hundreds of non-Christians. It is estimated that more than 300 civilians were murdered in what was the first ethnic cleansing of the Lebanese Civil War.
Taalabaya Massacre	December 31, 1975	Taalabaya, Zahle	35	(Lebanon) Lebanese Christians	(Palestine) Palestinians and Lebanese Shia Muslims	Location: Taalabaya, a strategic Christian-inhabited town on the periphery of Zahleh in the Beqaa Valley. Casualties: 35 residents killed. Perpetrators: The attack was carried out by a coalition of As-Sa'iqa commandos (a pro-Syrian Palestinian faction), elements of the Palestinian Liberation Army (PLA), and local allied gunmen from neighboring villages.
Akkar District December 1975	December 31, 1975	Akkar, Akkar District	numerous unspecified	(Lebanon) Lebanese Christians	(Palestine) Palestinian As-Sa'iqa & Lebanese National Movement	Regional security across the Akkar plain deteriorated further on December 31, 1975, when Fnaydeq militants and As-Sa'iqa commandos launched a broader offensive across Christian villages in the Akkar district, resulting in additional civilian casualties, looting, and widespread property destruction, driving further displacement from regional villages.
Aaysha Massacre	January 5, 1976	Aaysha, North Lebanon	28	(Lebanon) Lebanese Christians	(Palestine) Palestinians Fatah & PFLP	Occurred during the lead-up to the siege of Damour. Palestinian militias entered the village of Aaysha and executed 28 Maronite civilians. The massacre was part of a coordinated effort to clear Christian "pockets" in the northern hinterland to secure supply lines for the LNM.
Siege of Zahle (1976)	January–June 1976	Zahle, Beqaa Governorate	300+	(Lebanon) Lebanese Christians (civilians & internally displaced)	Palestine Liberation Organization, LNM, and As-Sa'iqa	Following the fall of surrounding villages like Taalabaya and Saadnayel, the city of Zahle was subjected to a total military blockade. Forensic documentation notes that the "siege" phase was characterized by the deliberate shelling of residential quarters, hospitals, and bakeries to force a surrender. Hundreds of non-combatants were killed by indiscriminate artillery fire and sniper activity at the city's entrances. This period is classified by humanitarian historians as a systematic effort to break the largest Christian enclave in the Beqaa through the denial of food, medicine, and the summary execution of those attempting to bypass the blockade.
Saadnayel Checkpoint Liquidations	January–June, 1976	Saadnayel, Zahle District	30+ (Estimated)	(Lebanon) Lebanese Christian civilians and transit travelers	(Palestine) PLO and LNM militias	During the prolonged blockade and subsequent Siege of Zahle, Saadnayel functioned as a primary "choke point" on the Beirut–Damascus highway. Forensic reports from the ICTJ and contemporary accounts document a series of "identity card" massacres where civilians attempting to bypass the front lines were intercepted and summarily executed. These liquidations were tactically linked to the isolation of the Zahle enclave and the enforcement of a sectarian frontier in the central Beqaa.
Jiyeh massacre 1976	January 16–17, 1976	Jiyeh	50-100	(Lebanon) Lebanese Christians	Palestine Liberation Organisation & Lebanese National Movement	Perpetrators: A coalition of the PLO and LNM. Casualties: Between 50 and 100 civilians killed. Victims: Mostly women and children. Strategy: The assault on Jiyeh was a strategic maneuver to secure the coastal highway and isolate Damour from the south. This attack served as a precursor to the larger siege of Damour, which occurred several days later. While often overshadowed by the subsequent events in Damour, the violence in Jiyeh resulted in the summary execution of residents and the total displacement of the town's population.
Haouch Barada massacre	January 18, 1976	Haouch Barada Baalbek	3	(Lebanon) Lebanese Christians	Palestine Liberation Organisation & Lebanese National Movement	The Christian town of Haouch-Barada, located in the vicinity of Baalbeck in the Beqaa Valley, was subjected to a targeted attack. The assault resulted in three civilian fatalities and significant structural damage to the town. Faced with this direct threat, the entire population of approximately 800 residents was forced to abandon their homes, seeking refuge in the relative safety of Zahleh and East Beirut.
Deir Al-Ahmar & Zahle siege	January 18–25, 1976	Deir Al-Ahmar Zahle	dozens	(Lebanon) Lebanese Christians	Palestine Liberation Organisation & Lebanese National Movement	Between January 18 and 25, 1976, the Beqaa Valley experienced a decisive escalation as 4,000 Palestine Liberation Army (PLA) troops backed by Syria, alongside the LNM, besieged the Christian strongholds of Zahleh and Deir al-Ahmar. The offensive utilized heavy artillery, tanks, and coordinated infantry maneuvers to shell residential areas and isolate these towns from external reinforcements, which resulted in significant civilian casualties and sparked a mass exodus of the local population.
Haret Hreik Massacre	January 18–19, 1976	Haret Hreik	~40	(Lebanon) Lebanese Christians	(Palestine) Palestinian Liberation Organisation, (Palestine) Fatah & (Palestine) As-Sa'iqa	Occurred during the expansion of the Joint Forces in the southern suburbs of Beirut. The ICTJ documents the summary execution of approximately 40 Christian residents following the collapse of local security.
Karantina massacre	January 18, 1976	Beirut	300–1,500	Palestinians and Lebanese Muslims	Kataeb Regulatory Forces	Karantina was an impoverished predominantly Muslim district — housing Lebanese and Palestine refugees, as well as others — in northeastern Beirut, and was overrun by the Lebanese Christian militias.
Deir Jannine massacre Jan 1976	January 19, 1976	Deir Jannine Akkar	9	(Lebanon) Lebanese Christians	Palestine Liberation Organisation & Lebanese National Movement	Muslim militants aligned with the Lebanese National Movement and pro-Syrian Palestinian factions attacked the village of Deir Janine in North Lebanon. The assault resulted in the execution of nine civilians, including two priests.
Bqerzala massacre	January 19, 1976	Bqerzla Akkar	2	(Lebanon) Lebanese Christians	Palestine Liberation Organisation & Lebanese National Movement	Two civilians were killed in the village of Bqerzala in Northern Lebanon. This targeted attack was carried out by local militias allied with the Lebanese National Movement and pro-Syrian Palestinian factions, as part of a wider campaign to establish territorial control and displace Christian residents across the Akkar district.
Rahbeh massacre	January 20, 1976	Rahbeh Akkar	50	(Lebanon) Lebanese Christians	Palestine Liberation Organisation, SSNP & Lebanese National Movement	On January 20, 1976, the village of Rahbeh in the Akkar region of North Lebanon was the site of a brutal massacre, resulting in the deaths of 50 civilians.
West Beirut checkpoint Massacre	January 20, 1976	West Beirut	30	(Lebanon) Lebanese Christians	Palestine Liberation Organization and Lebanese National Movement	In response to the Karantina massacre, gunmen established checkpoints across West Beirut to intercept civilians. During these operations, approximately 30 Christians were identified and summarily executed.
Damour massacre	January 20, 1976	Damour	582	(Lebanon) Lebanese Christians	A coalition of Palestine Liberation Organisation and Lebanese National Movement factions, including: (Palestine) Fatah (Commanding role) (Palestine) As-Sa'iqa (Commanding role) DFLP (Democratic Front for the Liberation of Palestine) LCP (Lebanese Communist Party) OCAL (Organization of Communist Action in Lebanon) Al-Murabitun	Following the Jiyeh Massacre several days earlier where the Damour entry point had been strategically penetrated in preparation, PLO and LNM militia forces launched a brutal assault on the town of Damour. The operation, which aimed to "empty the city" of its estimated 35,000 residents, resulted in a humanitarian catastrophe. Militants systematically killed entire families—including women, children, and the elderly—within their homes and in places of refuge, such as the local church. Survivors and historical accounts document widespread atrocities, including gang rapes, looting, arson, and the desecration of cemeteries. Casualty estimates: 582 civilian deaths. Among those killed were the family members of Christian militia leader Elie Hobeika, and his fiancée. Hobeika later led the Phalangists in the Sabra and Shatila massacre.
Occupation of Damour	January 1976 – June 1982	Damour, Chouf District	Numerous	(Lebanon) Lebanese Christians	Palestine Liberation Organization and PFLP	Following the January massacre, Palestinian factions established a military administration over the town of Damour, converting it into a strategic base. Any attempts by original Christian residents to return or reclaim property were met with summary execution or abduction. The town was forcibly repopulated with Palestinian refugees and militants, effectively liquidating the local Lebanese political and social presence for six years until the 1982 Israeli invasion.
Sidon Massacre	January 21–23, 1976	Sidon, South Lebanon	~20	Political rivals and Christians	Palestine Liberation Organisation Fatah & As-Sa'iqa	Following the withdrawal of the Lebanese internal security forces from Sidon, Palestinian units (As-Sa'iqa and Fatah) conducted a series of "cleaning" operations. The ICTJ documents the summary execution of approximately 20 individuals, including local political figures and Christian residents, during the establishment of the "Joint Forces" administration in the city.
Coastal Road Bus Massacre	January 22–24, 1976	Damour–Sidon Highway	~30	(Lebanon) Lebanese Christians	Palestine Liberation Organisation PFLP & DFLP	In the days following the fall of Damour, Palestinian PFLP and DFLP units established checkpoints along the coastal road between Sidon and Beirut. The ICTJ reports that approximately 30 Christian civilians fleeing the southern fighting were pulled from vehicles and executed. These "checkpoint massacres" are documented as a systematic effort to prevent the transit of displaced persons.
Nabatieh Massacre	January 22–24, 1976	Nabatieh, South Lebanon	~25	(Lebanon) Lebanese Christians	Palestine Liberation Organisation Fatah & PFLP	Following the withdrawal of the Lebanese Gendarmerie from Nabatieh, Palestinian units (Fatah and PFLP) conducted a series of house-to-house searches. The ICTJ documents the summary execution of approximately 25 individuals, including local civil servants and Christian residents, during the consolidation of the "Joint Forces" control over the city.
El-Qiddam massacre	January 23, 1976	El-Qiddam Baalbek	7	(Lebanon) Lebanese Christians	Palestine Liberation Organisation & Lebanese National Movement	On January 23, 1976, the village of al-Qiddam, located in the Baalbek district of the Beqaa Valley, was targeted in a deadly assault that resulted in the deaths of seven civilians. The assault was conducted by a coalition of forces including local militias affiliated with the Lebanese National Movement (LNM) and various pro-Syrian Palestinian factions (notably As-Sa'iqa).
Qabb Elias massacre	January 24, 1976	Qabb Ilyas Beqaa Valley	16	(Lebanon) Lebanese Christians	Palestine Liberation Organisation & Lebanese National Movement	On January 24, 1976, the Christian neighborhood of Qabb-Elias, located south of Zahleh in the Beqaa Valley, was targeted in a violent offensive that resulted in the deaths of 16 residents. The attack triggered a mass exodus, forcing approximately 300 families to flee their homes and seek refuge in Beirut and the Shuf Mountain village of Ain Dara. The assault was conducted by a coalition of forces including local militias affiliated with the Lebanese National Movement (LNM) and various pro-Syrian Palestinian factions such as As-Sa'iqa.
Beirut Newspapers Massacre	January 31, 1976	Beirut	7	Newspapers: Al-Muharrir and Beyrouth	Palestine Liberation Organization As-Sa'iqa	Palestinian As-Sa'iqa militants attacked the offices of two newspapers, killing the editor and six staff members.The victims were journalists and staff associated with the pro-Palestinian/Leftist camp.
Kharayeb Massacre	February 2, 1976	Kharayeb, Akkar District	11	(Lebanon) Lebanese Christians	(Palestine) Palestinian Fatah & Lebanese National Movement	Following the collapse of the northern front in the Akkar, Palestinian and LNM units entered Kharayeb. The ICTJ report identifies the summary execution of 11 civilians who were intercepted while attempting to flee toward the coast.
Mansourieh-Bhamdoun Massacre	March 1 to May 30, 1976.	Bhamdoun, Mansourieh Aley	9	(Lebanon) Lebanese Christians	Druze, LNM, PSP	In the spring of 1976 (March–May), sectarian tensions in the Aley district escalated into a series of targeted killings. Druze militants originating from the town of Btater abducted nine Christian residents from the nearby Mansourieh-Bhamdoun area. The victims were subsequently executed, and their bodies were left exposed on public roads to serve as a visual deterrent and a provocation to the local community.
Deir Qanoun el-Nahr Massacre	March 5, 1976	Deir Qanoun el-Nahr, Tyre District	12	(Lebanon) Lebanese Christian & Shia civilians	(Palestine) Palestinian PFLP-GC	During the 1976 "Spring Offensive" in the South, units of the PFLP-GC entered Deir Qanoun el-Nahr. The ICTJ report identifies the summary execution of 12 individuals suspected of opposing the Palestinian-led administration in the Tyre hinterland.
Qana Massacre 1976	March 10, 1976	Qana, Tyre District	10	(Lebanon) Lebanese Christian & Shia Civilians	(Palestine) Palestinian PFLP & As-Sa'iqa	During the establishment of the "Joint Forces" administration in the Tyre hinterland, Palestinian units conducted a series of house-to-house searches. The ICTJ documents the summary execution of 10 individuals suspected of political dissidence.
First Mardiyeh Massacre 1976	March 10–11, 1976	Mardiyeh Akkar	22	(Lebanon) Lebanese Christians	(Palestine) Palestinians PFLP	During a night raid intended to cut off supply lines to Christian enclaves in the North, militiamen executed 22 residents, including several women and elderly villagers.
Kaukaba Massacre Spring 1976	March 10–12, 1976	Kaukaba Hasbaya District South Lebanon	~20-30	(Lebanon) Lebanese Christians	Palestine Liberation Organisation & Lebanese Arab Army	During the 1976 spring offensive in South Lebanon, Palestinian militias and the Palestinian-aligned Lebanese Arab Army (LAA) overran the village. The takeover resulted in the summary execution of approximately 25 Christian residents and the total displacement of the civilian population.
Deir Dughiya Massacre	March 11, 1976	Deir Dughiya, Tyre District	15	(Lebanon) Lebanese Christians	(Palestine) Palestinian PFLP & (Palestine) DFLP	Following the capture of the village by PFLP and DFLP units, 15 Christian residents were executed in their homes. The ICTJ documents this as part of the systematic effort to clear the Tyre hinterland of populations perceived as hostile to the Palestinian military presence.
Miniara Massacre	March 12, 1976	Miniara Akkar District	10-12	(Lebanon) Lebanese Christians	Palestine Liberation Organisation Fatah & LNM allies	As part of the coordinated effort to secure the northern border regions, Palestinian Fatah units and allied local militias conducted a raid on Miniara. The ICTJ reports the execution of 10–12 civilians in the village as forces moved toward the Zgharta district line.
Khirbet Char Massacre	March 14, 1976	Khirbet Char, Akkar District	11	(Lebanon) Lebanese Christians	(Palestine) Palestinian Liberation Organisation & Lebanese Arab Army	During the Palestinian-led offensive in the Akkar district, units of the LAA and Palestinian militias entered Khirbet Char. The ICTJ mapping report identifies the summary execution of 11 Christian residents found in their homes.
Qoubaiyat Massacre 1976	March 15, 1976	Al-Qoubaiyat Akkar	significant	(Lebanon) Lebanese Christians	Palestine Liberation Organisation & Lebanese National Movement	On March 15, 1976, the Christian village of Qobayat in North Lebanon was subjected to a coordinated assault. The attack was carried out by members of the "Joint Forces" (a coalition of the Lebanese National Movement and Palestinian factions) with the direct military support of Fatah forces operating out of the Beqaa Valley. While specific casualty figures for the assault remain unverified, the attack resulted in significant civilian loss and local destabilization.
Tel Touraine Massacre	March 15, 1976	Tall Touraine, Akkar District	14	(Lebanon) Lebanese Christians	Palestine Liberation Organisation As-Sa'iqa	During the Palestinian-led push through the Akkar plain, As-Sa'iqa units overran the hamlet of Tall Touraine. 14 Christian residents were executed in their homes. This event is cited by the ICTJ as part of the systematic depopulation of the Akkar border region.
Rahbeh Executions Spring 1976	March 15–18, 1976	Rahbeh Akkar	~12-15	(Lebanon) Lebanese Christians	Palestine Liberation Organisation & Lebanese Arab Army	Following the initial massacre in January, the village was fully overran between March 15–18, 1976, during the Palestinian-led Spring Offensive in the Akkar district. Units of the Lebanese Arab Army (LAA) and Palestinian militias entered the village and conducted a series of summary executions. The ICTJ mapping identifies between 12 and 15 civilian deaths during this consolidation phase, leading to the final displacement of the local Christian population.
Khirbet Silm Massacre	March 18, 1976	Khirbet Silm, Bint Jbeil District	12	(Lebanon) Lebanese Christian & Shia civilians	Palestine Liberation Organisation Fatah & PFLP-GC	During the 1976 Spring Offensive in the South, Palestinian units entered Khirbet Silm. The ICTJ report identifies the summary execution of 12 residents suspected of opposing the Joint Forces' administration in the Bint Jbeil hinterland.
El-Abadieh Massacre	March 19, 1976	El-Abadieh	8	(Lebanon) Lebanese Christians	Druze Lebanese National Movement	On March 19, 1976, in the village of al-Abadieh (located in the Baabda district), a group of armed Druze men executed an entire Christian family of eight. Despite the family’s documented political loyalty to Kamal Jumblatt—a key leader within the Lebanese National Movement—they were not spared.
Salima Spring 1976 Massacre	March 20–31, 1976	Salima	~70	(Lebanon) Lebanese Christians	Palestine Liberation Organisation & Lebanese National Movement	Occurred during the Spring 1976 offensive by the PLO and Lebanese National Movement (LNM) against Christian enclaves in the Matn District. Historian William Harris identifies this period as a major phase of sectarian displacement, with approximately 70 Christian fatalities recorded in Salima.
Second Mardiyeh Massacre 1976	March 20–25, 1976	Mardiyeh Akkar North Lebanon	17	(Lebanon) Lebanese Christians	Palestine Liberation Organisation	Occurred during the "Two-Year War" phase as a retaliatory strike following the escalations in the Matn and the siege of Tel al-Zaatar. Units from the PLO (specifically As-Sa'iqa and Fatah elements) entered the Maronite village and executed 17 Christian civilians in their homes. The event is cited as part of the broader sectarian displacement occurring in North Lebanon during the spring of 1976.
Deir Jannine Massacre Spring 1976	March 22, 1976	Deir Jannine, Akkar	~10	(Lebanon) Lebanese Christians	(Palestine) Palestinian Liberation Army	Distinguished from the initial January raids, this March 22 event occurred as the Palestinian Liberation Army (PLA) fully occupied the village. The ICTJ mapping identifies the summary execution of the remaining 10 Christian residents who had stayed behind after the initial January clashes.
Nabatieh Hospital Massacre	March 22, 1976	Nabatieh, Nabatieh Governorate	6	(Lebanon) Lebanese Christian medical personnel and civilians	Palestine Liberation Organisation / Fatah and Lebanese National Movement	During the Joint Forces takeover of state infrastructure in Nabatieh, militants summarily executed six individuals at the local hospital. The victims included Christian nurses and civilians who had sought refuge in the facility. The ICTJ documents this as part of a broader campaign to purge state institutions of "unreliable" sectarian elements during the collapse of the Lebanese Army.
Mtein Massacre	March 25, 1976	Mtein	53	(Lebanon) Lebanese Christians	Palestine Liberation Organisation & Lebanese National Movement	On March 25, 1976, a brutal attack occurred in the village of Mtein in the Upper Metn district, resulting in the death of 53 Christian civilians, including a nun. Several of the victims were affiliated with the Syrian Social Nationalist Party (SSNP). Beyond the killings, the village suffered systematic destruction: residential homes were looted and set on fire, local churches were destroyed, and cemeteries were desecrated in an effort to erase the community's presence.
Ras el-Matn Massacre	March 25, 1976	Ras el-Matn, Baabda District	15	(Lebanon) Lebanese Christians	Palestine Liberation Organisation As-Sa'iqa & Lebanese National Movement	Distinguished from the general combat in the Metn, the takeover of Ras el-Matn by As-Sa'iqa and LNM militias resulted in the summary execution of 15 Christian residents who had stayed behind. The ICTJ mapping report cites this as a specific instance of sectarian cleansing during the fall of the mountain fronts.
Kfar Selouane Massacre	March 26, 1976	Kfar Selouane, Baabda District	18	(Lebanon) Lebanese Christians	Palestine Liberation Organisation PFLP & Lebanese National Movement	Following the collapse of the mountain fronts in late March, PFLP-led units overran the village of Kfar Selouane. The ICTJ documents the summary execution of 18 civilians. This massacre preceded the fall of Mtein and Salima and was a major factor in the displacement of the Upper Metn population.
Bireh Massacre Spring 1976	March 28–30, 1976	Bireh Chouf District	~35-40	(Lebanon) Lebanese Christians	Palestine Liberation Organization Fatah & Lebanese Arab Army	Following the collapse of the mountain fronts in late March, Palestinian Fatah units and the LAA overran the village. The ICTJ documents the summary execution of approximately 35 Christian residents who were unable to flee. This event was a major factor in the total displacement of the Christian population from the upper Chouf during the "Two-Year War."
Ouyoun el-Simaan Massacre	March 28, 1976	Ouyoun el-Simaan, Keserwan	~20	(Lebanon) Lebanese Christians	Palestine Liberation Organisation Fatah & Lebanese Arab Army	Following the capture of the Ouyoun el-Simaan heights by Palestinian Fatah units and the LAA, approximately 20 individuals, including non-combatant support staff, were executed.
Chrine Massacre	March 29, 1976	Chrine, Baabda District	7	(Lebanon) Lebanese Christians	(Palestine) Palestinian PFLP & Lebanese National Movement	During the consolidation of the Upper Metn, PFLP-led units overran the hamlet of Chrine. The ICTJ documents the summary execution of 7 residents found in their homes following the collapse of local defenses.
Mtein Farmhouse Massacre	March 29, 1976	Rural outskirts of Mtein, Baabda District	5	(Lebanon) Lebanese Christians	(Palestine) Palestinian PFLP & Lebanese National Movement	Distinguished from the primary urban battle, historian William Harris identifies a secondary execution of 5 residents who had sought refuge in remote farmhouses on the outskirts of Mtein.
Afka (Aqoura) Massacre	March 30–31, 1976	Afka/Aqoura Pass, Jbeil District	12-15	(Lebanon) Lebanese Christians	Palestine Liberation Organisation PFLP & Lebanese National Movement	During the 1976 Spring Offensive, PFLP units and local LNM allies seized the mountain passes in the Jbeil district. The ICTJ documents the execution of 12–15 Christian civilians, primarily travelers and local residents, who were intercepted while attempting to reach the safety of the Keserwan.
Mount Lebanon Massacre	April 1 to June 30, 1976.	Aley, Baabda, Matn District, Chouf District, Mount Lebanon	69+	(Lebanon) Lebanese Christians	Druze, Lebanese National Movement, Lebanese Arab Army, Palestine Liberation Organisation	Between April and June 1976, Druze militias, supported by the LAA, LNM & PLO conducted a systematic campaign of violence against Christian villages across Mount Lebanon. This offensive, marked by looting, targeted executions, and widespread property destruction, forced a mass exodus of the Christian population toward the Beqaa and Metn regions. 69 civilian fatalities were documented, broken up per district as follows: Aley - 37 (High density of attacks; frequent mutilations). Baabda & Upper Metn - 20 (Organized village raids and destruction). Chouf & Coastal - 12 (Targeted kidnappings and summary executions).
East Beirut Sniping Campaigns (Sodeco/Museum)	April - June, 1976	Green Line, Beirut	150+	(Lebanon) Lebanese Christians	(Palestine) Palestinian PFLP & (Palestine) DFLP snipers	During the height of the "Two-Year War," Palestinian PFLP and DFLP sniper units positioned in West Beirut systematically targeted Christian civilians attempting to cross the Museum and Sodeco checkpoints. The ICTJ reports that these "massacres of opportunity" resulted in over 150 civilian deaths during the spring of 1976, targeting commuters and residents near the Green Line.
Deir el-Aachayer Massacre	April 2, 1976	Deir al-Ashayer, Rashaya District	14	(Lebanon) Christians & Druze	Palestine Liberation Army & As-Sa'iqa	Documented by the ICTJ as part of a campaign to secure the strategic border region with Syria. 14 residents were summarily executed to facilitate the movement of pro-Syrian Palestinian units and the Syrian military's initial covert entry into the Beqaa Valley. This event is forensically significant for showing early Syrian-coordinated "cleansing" of border populations.
Hawch el-Oumara Spring 1976 Massacre	April 17–18, 1976	Hawch el-Oumara, Beqaa	~20	(Lebanon) Lebanese Christians	Palestine Liberation Organisation & Lebanese National Movement	During the initial siege of Zahle, Palestinian-led Joint Forces overran the suburb of Hawch el-Oumara. Approximately 20 civilians were executed in a series of house-to-house searches. This massacre marked the beginning of the protracted battle for control over the Beqaa's primary Christian center.
Rayak-Ablah Road Massacre	April 20–22, 1976	Rayak–Ablah Road, Beqaa Valley	15-20	(Lebanon) Lebanese Christians	Palestine Liberation Organisation Fatah & Lebanese Arab Army	During the siege of Zahle and the takeover of the Rayak airbase, Palestinian Fatah units and the LAA established checkpoints along the Rayak-Ablah road. Approximately 15–20 Christian civilians were pulled from vehicles and executed. The ICTJ identifies these as "massacres of opportunity" to prevent the reinforcement of Zahle.
Jezzine-Sidon Road Ambushes	April 21–25, 1976	Jezzine–Sidon Highway	~45	(Lebanon) Lebanese Christians	Palestine Liberation Organisation Fatah & PFLP	Following the collapse of the southern front, Palestinian units (Fatah and PFLP) established "death checkpoints" along the mountain road between Jezzine and Sidon. The ICTJ documents the summary execution of approximately 45 Christian civilians who were pulled from their cars while attempting to flee toward the Maronite heartland.
Qaa el-Rim Massacre	April 22, 1976	Qâa er Rîm, Beqaa Valley	10-12	(Lebanon) Lebanese Christians	(Palestine) Palestinian PFLP & (Palestine) As-Sa'iqa	During the coordinated assault on the outskirts of Zahle, PFLP and As-Sa'iqa units seized the village of Qaa el-Rim. The ICTJ mapping report identifies the summary execution of 10–12 Christian residents found in the village. This action was part of the strategic isolation of the Zahle enclave.
Kfar Houna Massacre 1976	May 10, 1976	Kfar Hounah, Jezzine District	14	(Lebanon) Lebanese Christians	Palestine Liberation Organisation Fatah & Lebanese National Movement	Following the fall of the mountain defenses in the Jezzine district, Palestinian Fatah units and LNM militias entered Kfar Houne. The ICTJ documents the summary execution of 14 Christian residents found in their homes. This event contributed to the total displacement of the Christian population from the Jezzine hinterland.
Kfar Melki Massacre	May 12, 1976	Kfar Melki, Sidon District	14	(Lebanon) Lebanese Christians	Palestine Liberation Organisation Fatah & Lebanese National Movement	Following the fall of local defenses during the "Mountain War" phase in the South, Palestinian Fatah units and LNM militias entered Kfar Milki. The ICTJ documents the summary execution of 14 Christian residents found in their homes.
Bint Jbeil Identity Executions	May 15, 1976	Bint Jbeil, Nabatieh Governorate	8	Shia Muslim civilians	Palestine Liberation Organisation / Fatah and Lebanese National Movement	During the "Spring Offensive" of the Joint Forces, eight residents of Bint Jbeil were summarily executed for attempting to organize a local "neutrality committee." Historian William Harris notes that the PLO-commanded Joint Forces viewed such committees as a threat to their staging grounds for cross-border operations. The executions were intended to intimidate the local population into providing total logistical support for the guerrilla front.
Bombing of Jounieh and Bkerke	May 18, 1976	Jounieh and Bkerke	Multiple (un- documented total)	(Lebanon) Lebanese Christians	Palestine Liberation Organisation & Lebanese National Movement	Location: Jounieh and Bkerke (Maronite Patriarchate), Lebanon. Victims: Maronite residents of Jounieh and the Maronite clergy at Bkerke. In response to the Syrian-mediated election of Elias Sarkis, forces belonging to the Lebanese National Movement and Joint Forces heavily shelled the Christian stronghold of Jounieh and the seat of the Maronite Patriarchate in Bkerke.
East Beirut Retaliatory Shelling	June 1976 – August 1976	East Beirut, Beirut	150–300+ killed (thousands wounded)	(Lebanon) Lebanese Christians	(Palestine) PLO	During the siege of Palestinian camps in East Beirut, PLO artillery units in West Beirut and the surrounding hills launched daily retaliatory shelling campaigns against Christian residential neighborhoods like Ashrafieh and Dekwaneh. These attacks, which targeted non-combatants, resulted in hundreds of deaths and massive property destruction, serving as a desperate counter-pressure to the Maronite militia advances.
Kaukaba Massacre June 1976	June 14, 1976	Kaukaba South Lebanon	15-20	(Lebanon) Lebanese Christians	(Palestine) Palestinians, Fatah, Lebanese Arab Army	Occurred as Palestinian forces attempted to expand their control in the south. Armed groups entered the village and executed a group of civilians who had refused to leave their homes.
Qa'a massacre 1976	July 1, 1976	Qaa, Baalbek District	12	(Lebanon) Lebanese Christians	Palestine Liberation Organisation Fatah & Lebanese National Movement	During the effort to secure the Hermel-Qaa corridor in the Northern Beqaa, Palestinian and local LNM militias entered the village. The ICTJ report documents the summary execution of 12 residents as the "Joint Forces" established an administrative presence in the region.
Chekka massacre	July 5, 1976	Chekka and Hamat	200	(Lebanon) Lebanese Christians	Palestine Liberation Organisation & Lebanese National Movement	The attack was launched from Tripoli by Palestinian militants and members of a left-wing group called Jund Allah. The group stormed the Christian pro-Syrian Social Nationalist Party settlement of Chekka as well as Hamat. An estimated 200 people were killed in the ensuing 24 hours. Residents tried to flee through a tunnel to Batroun but the attackers blocked the exit. Many were killed as their cars caught fire, and they suffocated to death.
Kousba Massacre	July 5–6, 1976	Kousba, Koura District	12–15	(Lebanon) Lebanese Christian civilians (Greek Orthodox)	Palestine Liberation Organisation and Lebanese National Movement	Concurrent with the assault on Chekka and Hamat, Joint Forces militants overran the town of Kousba. Twelve to fifteen Lebanese Greek Orthodox civilians were summarily executed as the militias attempted to block the main road to the Bsharri highlands. The ICTJ documents this as a strategic blocking massacre intended to isolate the northern Christian strongholds.
Amioun massacre	July 10–12, 1976	Amioun, Koura District	~30-40	(Lebanon) Lebanese Christians	Palestine Liberation Organisation Fatah & As-Sa'iqa	Following the Syrian intervention, Palestinian forces (Fatah and As-Sa'iqa) launched a punitive expedition into the Koura District. In Amioun, approximately 30–40 residents were executed or killed during the shelling of civilian areas. The ICTJ notes this as a significant event of sectarian violence in the North during the summer of 1976.
Bourj Hammoud Blockade Massacre	July 10–12, 1976	Bourj Hammoud, East Beirut	~25	(Lebanon) Lebanese Christians	Palestine Liberation Organisation & PFLP	During the height of the siege of Tel al-Zaatar, Palestinian militias launched retaliatory raids and sniper attacks into the neighboring civilian district of Bourj Hammoud. The ICTJ reports the summary execution of approximately 25 civilians, primarily Armenians and Maronites, during a 48-hour window of intense urban combat.
Kfar Nabrakh Massacre	August 5, 1976	Kfar Nabrakh, Chouf District	11	(Lebanon) Lebanese Christians	(Palestine) Palestinian PFLP & Lebanese National Movement	During the height of the 1976 "Mountain War," PFLP units and local LNM militias overran the village of Kfar Nabrakh. The ICTJ documents the summary execution of 11 Christian residents who were found in their homes after the village defense collapsed.
Maaser el-Chouf Massacre (1976)	August 9, 1976	Maaser el-Chouf, Chouf District	~20	(Lebanon) Lebanese Maronite Christians	Palestine Liberation Organization and Lebanese National Movement	A significant liquidation during the "Two-Year War." Following a PLO-LNM offensive in the Chouf, approximately 20 Christian civilians were executed. This event is forensically distinct from the 1977 & 1983 massacres in the same village. Historians cite this earlier massacre as the catalyst for the first wave of Christian displacement from the Chouf, effectively ending the period of "cautious coexistence" that had persisted during the war's first year.
Tel al-Zaatar massacre	August 12, 1976	Beirut	1,500–5,000	(Palestine) Palestinians	Kataeb Regulatory Forces	Christian Phalangists and other rightwing Christian militias besieged Tel Al-Zaatar with help from Syrian Army units; after heavy fighting, they killed Palestinian civilian refugees and PLO fedayeen or fighters. 4,000 injured.
Aley-Bhamdoun Road Massacre	August 13, 1976	Aley / Bhamdoun Highway	11-20	(Lebanon) Lebanese Christian civilians (mostly elderly and women)	Palestine Liberation Organisation and Lebanese National Movement	In the immediate aftermath of the fall of Tel al-Zaatar, Joint Forces units operating in the Aley district intercepted a civilian convoy. At least eleven passengers were pulled from their vehicles and summarily executed by the roadside, with others kidnapped and later found deceased. This incident is cited by historians as a primary example of "reprisal killing" that fueled the permanent sectarian partition of the Mount Lebanon transit corridors.
Deir el-Qamar Road Massacre	August 15, 1976	Deir el-Qamar, Chouf District	9	(Lebanon) Maronite Christian civilians	Palestine Liberation Organisation and Lebanese National Movement (Jumblatt-aligned militias)	Following the fall of Tel al-Zaatar, LNM-affiliated militias intercepted a civilian convoy departing Deir el-Qamar. Nine passengers were summarily executed at a roadblock. The ICTJ notes this as a retaliatory killing for the events in East Beirut, further entrenching the sectarian divide in the Chouf mountains.
Salha Massacre	August 17, 1976	Salha, South Lebanon	~80	(Lebanon) Lebanese Christians	(Palestine) Palestinians & Lebanese National Movement	During the "Two-Year War" phase, Palestinian-led forces overran the village. Christian civilians were reportedly gathered in a central location and executed. The village was subsequently destroyed and its population displaced.
Rahbe Massacre Aug 1976	August 19, 1976	Rahbe, Akkar District	12	(Lebanon) Lebanese Greek Orthodox civilians	(Palestine) Palestinian As-Sa'iqa and Syrian Social Nationalist Party SSNP	Following the fall of Tel al-Zaatar in Beirut, Syrian-backed as-Sa'iqa and SSNP units conducted a "mopping up" operation in Rahbe to finalize control of the border. Twelve residents—primarily elderly men who had returned to tend to their land—were summarily executed. Regional historians cite this as a strategic "border-cleansing" to secure Syrian supply lines into the North.
Beit Mellat Church Execution	September 5, 1976	Beit Mellat, Akkar	12	(Lebanon) Lebanese Christians	(Palestine) Palestinians Fatah	Following the escalation of the "Mountain War" in the North, Fatah units entered the village of Beit Mellat. The ICTJ documents the execution of 12 civilians who had sought refuge in a local church. This event was part of the final push by Palestinian forces to isolate the Zgharta district.
Salima massacre	September 28–30, 1976	Salima	29	Druze	Kataeb Regulatory Forces	Christian fighters from Damour killed 29 Druze civilians in Salima.
Lebaa Massacre	October 12, 1976	Lebaa, Jezzine District	11	(Lebanon) Lebanese Christians	(Palestine) Palestinian As-Sa'iqa & Lebanese National Movement	During the final cleaning operations in the Sidon hinterland before the ADF intervention, Syrian-backed Palestinian As-Sa'iqa and local LNM militias overran the village of Labaa. The ICTJ documents the summary execution of 11 Christian residents found in their homes.
Kfar Jarra Massacre	October 13–14, 1976	Kfar Jarra, Sidon District	7	(Lebanon) Lebanese Christians	(Palestine) Palestinian As-Sa'iqa & Lebanese National Movement	Following the fall of Labaa, As-Sa'iqa and allied LNM units moved into the adjacent village of Kfar Jarra. Reports identify the summary execution of 7 civilians, primarily elderly residents who had been unable to flee toward Jezzine.
Kfar Kila Massacre 1976	October 16, 1976	Kfar Kila, Nabatieh Governorate	7	Shia Muslim civilians	Palestine Liberation Organisation and Lebanese National Movement	During the initial rollout of the "Good Fence" policy on the southern border, Joint Forces units summarily executed seven Shia residents of Kfar Kila. The victims were accused of collaboration for seeking medical assistance and work across the border in Israel. Historian William Harris identifies this incident as a pivotal moment that accelerated the formation of local Shia self-defense units and deepened the rift between the southern population and the Palestinian-Leftist command.
Aishiyeh massacre 1976	October 19–21, 1976	Aishiyeh	70+	(Lebanon) Lebanese Christians	(Palestine) Fatah, As-Sa'iqa, Lebanese National Movement	The Lebanese National Movement (LNM) and Palestinian militias Fatah and As-Sa'iqa captured the Christian village of Aychiye in South Lebanon. The assault resulted in a massacre of the civilian population, with documented fatalities estimated at over 70 individuals, including women and children, and over 100 injured.
Maasser Beit Eddine executions	October 28, 1976	Maasser Beit Eddine	16	(Lebanon) Lebanese Christians	Druze PSP	16 Christian civilians, including a family of eight, were killed by PSP members in Maasser Beit ed-Dine.
Accaoui Car Bombing	January 3, 1977	Achrafieh	30+	(Lebanon) Lebanese Christians	Syrian Armed Forces, Arab Deterrent Force	This was the first major car bombing of its kind in the Lebanese Civil War. The explosion caused catastrophic damage to several apartment buildings and storefronts in the Accaoui district. The sheer scale of the civilian carnage shocked the city, as car bombs had not yet become a "standard" tactic of the conflict. Casualties: 30+ deaths; 100+ wounded.
Aishiyeh Massacre 1977	January 5, 1977	Aishiyeh, Jezzine District	12	(Lebanon) Lebanese Christian civilians	Palestine Liberation Organisation and Lebanese National Movement	During the redeployment of Palestinian and LNM forces ahead of the Syrian-led Arab Deterrent Force (ADF) entry into the Jezzine area, militants conducted a final clearing operation in Aishiya. Twelve residents, many of whom had survived the October 1976 massacre, were summarily executed. The ICTJ documents this as an effort to ensure no hostile civilian presence remained in the strategic corridor connecting the Chouf to the South.
Salima Massacre 1977	March 16, 1977	Salima, Matn District	14	(Lebanon) Lebanese Christian civilians	Druze PSP and Lebanese National Movement	Part of the "Black March" reprisals following the assassination of Kamal Jumblatt. While most reprisals occurred in the Chouf, this specific massacre targeted the Christian population of Salima in the Metn district.
Brieh Massacre 1977	March 16–17, 1977	Brieh, Chouf District	13	(Lebanon) Lebanese Christians	Lebanese National Movement (specifically PLA units and local (Palestine) Palestinian backed militias	In the immediate aftermath of the assassination of Kamal Jumblatt, Palestinian-backed LNM militias entered the village of Brieh. Summary execution of 13 Christian residents was reported as part of a wider wave of violence across the Chouf district. This event preceded the larger displacement and 1983 massacre in the same village.
Chouf massacres (1977)	March 16, 1977 – March 30, 1977	Chouf	177-250	(Lebanon) Lebanese Christians	Druze PSP	Series of massacres and forced displacements on Christian civilians following Kamal Jumblatt's death.
Mazraat el-Chouf Massacre	March 17, 1977	Mazraat el-Chouf	52	(Lebanon) Lebanese Christians	Druze	A series of retaliatory killings of Christian civilians in the Shouf district following the assassination of Druze leader Kamal Jumblatt.
Maaser el-Chouf Massacre 1977	March 17, 1977	Maaser el-Chouf	25+	(Lebanon) Lebanese Christians	Druze	Part of the wave of sectarian violence following Jumblatt's death. Civilians were targeted in their homes and during attempts to flee the Shouf region toward East Beirut.
Moukhtara Massacre	March 17, 1977	Moukhtara Chouf District	144	(Lebanon) Lebanese Christians	Druze PSP militias	Following the assassination of Druze leader Kamal Jumblatt, armed groups targeted the Christian population in Moukhtara. Syrian Arab Deterrent Forces (ADF) eventually intervened to stop the sectarian killings.
Barouk Massacre	March 17, 1977	Barouk Chouf District	33	(Lebanon) Lebanese Christians	Druze PSP militias	Part of the wave of "revenge killings" in the Shouf. Civilian residents were reportedly executed in their homes or while attempting to flee the village during the chaos following Jumblatt's death.
Hermel Massacre	May 22, 1977	Hermel, Beqaa Governorate	14	(Lebanon) Lebanese Christian civilians	Syrian Armed Forces & Syrian Social Nationalist Party (SSNP)	During the consolidation of the Arab Deterrent Force (ADF) control in the northern Beqaa, Syrian units and SSNP militants intercepted fourteen Christian residents attempting to evacuate the Hermel district. The victims were summarily executed at a makeshift checkpoint. Historian William Harris identifies this incident as a key factor in the total demographic "cleansing" of the northern Beqaa panhandle by pro-Syrian forces.
Tripoli Port Massacre	July 11, 1977	Tripoli, North Governorate	9	(Lebanon) Lebanese Internal Security Forces and Customs Officials	Palestine Liberation Organisation and Lebanese National Movement	In a final act of defiance against the entry of the Arab Deterrent Force (ADF) into the northern ports, Joint Forces militants executed nine state officials at the Tripoli port. The victims, primarily Christian and Sunni state loyalists, were targeted to prevent the transfer of administrative control to the Syrian-led command. The ICTJ documents this as a critical moment in the permanent loss of state maritime revenue.
St George's Church attack	August 21, 1977	Brih, Chouf	13	(Lebanon) Lebanese Christians	Druze	Druze leftist gunmen attacked St George's Church during prayers on Sunday with automatic gunfire inside and around the church killing 13 people.
Martyrs’ Square Bombing	February 1, 1978	Beirut	20	Lebanese Civilians	Syrian Armed Forces or proxies.	A powerful bomb was detonated in the heart of Beirut’s historic city center. Martyrs’ Square was the functional hub of the capital, serving as a transit point and commercial crossroads. The blast targeted the dense midday crowd, causing high fatalities and significant structural damage to the surrounding Ottoman-era architecture. Casualties: 20 deaths; dozens wounded.
Maarad Street Explosion	February 3, 1978	Beirut	Undetermined	Lebanese Civilians	Syrian Armed Forces or proxies.	Only 48 hours after the Martyrs’ Square massacre, a second explosion rocked the nearby Maarad Street, a famous thoroughfare known for its arcaded buildings and administrative offices.
Fayadieh Incident and East Beirut Shelling (Feb 1978)	February 7–9, 1978	Fayadieh, Ain El Remmaneh, Karm al-Zeitoun, Badaro, East Beirut	100+	(Lebanon) Lebanese Christians	Syrian Armed Forces, Arab Deterrent Force	Following a military clash between the Lebanese Army and Syrian ADF units at the Fayadieh barracks on February 7, 1978, Syrian forces initiated a heavy artillery bombardment of the Christian-populated neighborhoods of Ain al-Remmaneh, Karm al-Zeitoun, and Badaro. The shelling resulted in at least 100 civilian deaths and 200 injuries, signaling the start of open hostilities between the Syrian military and the Lebanese Front.
April 1978 Shelling of East Beirut	April 12, 1978	Ain El Remmaneh, Badaro, East Beirut	60	(Lebanon) Lebanese Christians	Syrian Armed Forces, Arab Deterrent Force	Following three days of street fighting between the Tigers Militia (PNL) and Syrian forces along the Chiyah–Ain al-Remmaneh axis, the Syrian military launched a massive artillery bombardment on the residential sectors of Ain al-Remmaneh and Badaro. The density of the neighborhoods led to a high civilian casualty rate in a single day of shelling. 60 deaths; 250 injured.
May 1978 Bombardment of Ain al-Remmaneh	May 6, 1978	Ain El Remmaneh, East Beirut	3	(Lebanon) Lebanese Christians	Syrian Armed Forces, Arab Deterrent Force	Renewed clashes between Christian militias and Syrian units led to a targeted bombardment of Ain al-Remmaneh. While the death toll was lower than the April 12 event, it is recorded in human rights mapping as a continued pattern of targeting civilian-populated militia strongholds.
Ehden massacre	June 13, 1978	Ehden	40	Marada Movement	Kataeb Regulatory Forces	It was an inter-Christian attack that occurred between the Maronite clans. Following the kidnapping and assassination of Jude al-Bayeh, a Kataeb leader in Zgharta (Marada heartland) by members of Marada, a Phalangist squad attacked the mansion of Frangieh family in an attempt to capture Ehden, killing nearly 40 people including Tony Frangieh, his spouse and his three-year-old daughter, Jihane. After the retaliatory massacre, the power of the Frangiehs is reported to have declined.
Sebhel Massacre	June 14, 1978	Sebhel, Zgharta District	14	(Lebanon) Lebanese Christians	Palestine Liberation Organisation & Lebanese National Movement	During the height of the clashes in the Zgharta district in June 1978, Palestinian-led units launched a raid on the village of Sebhel. 14 Christian civilians were executed.
Qaa, Ras Baalbek, Jdeidet al-Fekha & Fakiha Massacres	June 28, 1978	Qaa, Ras Baalbek, Jdeidet al-Fekha & Fakiha	26-40	Kataeb Party and NLP members and (Lebanon) Lebanese Christian civilians	Syrian Defense Companies and Syrian Special Mission Forces (coordinated with Marada Brigade)	A series of coordinated retaliatory executions following the Ehden massacre of Tony Frangieh. According to contemporary reports, gunmen entered the four villages with pre-prepared lists of names, targeting local supporters of the Lebanese Front. Phalangist radio reported that 40 individuals were kidnapped, with at least 26 confirmed killed. The event is forensically categorized as part of the June 28 "Black Day" reprisals, highlighting the use of state-level Syrian military assets to execute local clan-based revenge across the Beqaa and Northern districts.
Kfar Zaina Massacre	June 28, 1978	Kfar Zaina, Zgharta District	12	(Lebanon) Lebanese Maronite Christians	Syrian Intelligence and Syrian Special Mission Forces (coordinated with Marada Brigade)	Part of the same June 28 "Black Day" as Sebhel and Al-Qaa. Syrian troops entered the village and executed 12 civilians in a targeted strike against Maronite enclaves. Forensic analysis of these three concurrent massacres points to a high-level Syrian command decision to use mass execution as a political tool to break the Lebanese Front's influence in the northern districts.
Sebhel Massacre (Syrian Reprisal)	June 28, 1978	Sebhel, Zgharta District	14	(Lebanon) Lebanese Maronite Christians	Syrian Intelligence (coordinated with Marada Brigade)	A professional execution carried out by the Syrian military and GID. Two weeks after the Ehden Massacre, Syrian forces entered Sebhel and executed 14 Maronite civilians. Occurring the same day as the massacres in Al-Qaa and Kfar Zaina, this event confirms a coordinated Syrian "Black Day" operation aimed at liquidating Christian resistance influence across North Lebanon and the Beqaa.
Hundred Days' War	July 1 – October 7, 1978	East Beirut and the Northern Enclave.	300+	(Lebanon) Lebanese Christians	Syrian Armed Forces, Arab Deterrent Force	Syrian forces utilized "scorched earth" tactics, firing at a rate that sometimes reached one bomb per minute. The campaign resulted in the total or partial destruction of 60,000 buildings and the temporary displacement of nearly half of Beirut's population (approx. 250,000 people). Casualties: Several hundred civilians killed; 1,000+ injured.
Shelling of Hotel-Dieu Hospital and East Beirut (1978)	July 2, 1978	Achrafieh, Hadath, Ain El Remmaneh, and Furn El-Chebbak (East Beirut)	60	(Lebanon) Lebanese Christians + hospital patients	Syrian Armed Forces, Arab Deterrent Force	On the second day of the Hundred-Day War, Syrian forces launched a massive artillery barrage using 240mm heavy mortars. The shelling famously struck the Hotel-Dieu de France hospital with 130 shells, destroying 20 rooms. Saint Georges and Geitawi hospitals were also hit. Casualties: 60 deaths; 300 wounded.
Hadath Bombardment	July 23, 1978	Hadath	10	(Lebanon) Lebanese Christians	Syrian Armed Forces, Arab Deterrent Force	A concentrated artillery strike targeted the town of Hadath, a strategic Christian-dominated area. The high ratio of injuries to deaths was attributed to the use of heavy caliber weapons in a residential setting, forcing the local population to remain in underground shelters for weeks. Casualties: 10 deaths; 100+ wounded.
Achrafieh Perimeter Massacre	August 1, 1978	Achrafieh, East Beirut	10–15	(Lebanon) Lebanese Christian civilians	Syrian Army	Syrian units briefly penetrated the residential perimeters of Achrafieh. Between 10 and 15 civilians were pulled from shelters or building entrances and executed. This incident is historically noted as a psychological tactic used by the Syrian command to force a civilian exodus from the East Beirut enclave.
Museum Crossing Massacre	August 10, 1978	Beirut Museum, Beirut	14	(Lebanon) Lebanese Red Cross volunteers and Christian civilians	Syrian Armed Forces	Syrian units stationed at the Museum crossing executed fourteen individuals, including three identified Red Cross volunteers. The victims, primarily Christians from East Beirut, were summarily executed at the checkpoint. The ICTJ documents this as a systematic effort to enforce a total blockade and terrorize the civilian population attempting to navigate the Green Line.
Fakhani Building Bombing	August 13, 1978	Fakhani district West Beirut	148	Palestine Liberation Organization Fatah	(Palestine) Palestinian Arab Liberation Front	A massive explosion completely leveled an eight-story apartment building that served as a headquarters for the PLO. It remains one of the deadliest single-building bombings of the civil war era, occurring amidst the fierce rivalry between pro-Iraqi and pro-Syrian factions within the Palestinian movement.
North Lebanon and Beqaa Offensive (Aug 1978)	August 24–26, 1978	Koura, Batroun, North Lebanon, Ainata, Mshatiyyeh, Deir Al-Ahmar, Beqaa Valley	37	(Lebanon) Lebanese Christians	Syrian Armed Forces, Arab Deterrent Force	Between August 24 and 26, 1978, Syrian ADF troops conducted a wide-scale military operation targeting Christian-populated areas. Forces attacked positions in the Koura and Batroun districts of North Lebanon while simultaneously entering the villages of Ainata, Mshatiyyeh, and Deir al-Ahmar in the Beqaa Valley. The offensive resulted in 37 deaths, consisting primarily of local civilians caught in the crossfire or targeted during the military occupation.
Bcharre Kidnappings and Executions	August 27–28, 1978	Bcharre, North Lebanon	6	(Lebanon) Lebanese Christians	Syrian Armed Forces, Arab Deterrent Force	On August 27 and 28, 1978, soldiers from the Syrian-led Arab Deterrent Force (ADF) kidnapped six Lebanese citizens from the town of Bcharre. The victims were summarily executed and their bodies burned before the remains were returned to local authorities. This incident occurred during a broader Syrian military offensive in North Lebanon and the Beqaa Valley aimed at dismantling the influence of the Lebanese Front.
Black Saturday Shelling	September 30, 1978	East Beirut, Jounieh, Eastern Metn	70	(Lebanon) Lebanese Christians	Syrian Armed Forces, Arab Deterrent Force	Occurring near the end of the Hundred-Day War, this was one of the most widespread single-day bombardments of the conflict. Syrian artillery expanded its range beyond Beirut to strike the port city of Jounieh and the mountain villages of the Metn. The use of Grad missiles and incendiary phosphorus bombs during this period led to massive civilian displacement. 70 deaths; 300 wounded.
Baalchmay Family Massacre	November 1978	Baalchmay	9	(Lebanon) Lebanese Christians	Druze	In a particularly brutal sectarian attack, a gunman entered the village and executed an entire family of nine. This event contributed significantly to the atmosphere of fear that preceded the wider "Mountain War."
Alali and Rasha Raid	November 15, 1978	Alali and Rasha, North Lebanon	2	(Lebanon) Lebanese Christians	Marada Movement	In a retaliatory atmosphere following the Ehden Massacre, Marada gunmen raided the villages of Alali and Rasha. Fifteen civilians were abducted and subjected to physical abuse before two were executed. This was part of a pattern of "tit-for-tat" kidnappings in the Batroun and Koura districts.
Amchit Massacre	December 15, 1978	Amchit, Jbeil District	~10	(Lebanon) Lebanese Armed Forces (Commandos) and civilians	Syrian Armed Forces	Following the Syrian military's consolidation of the North, Syrian special forces and GID units moved against the Lebanese Army's commando barracks and local administrative hubs in Amchit. Approximately 10 individuals, including high-ranking officers and civilian officials perceived as resistant to Syrian oversight, were summarily executed. This is cited as the final strategic move of 1978 to neutralize the independent capabilities of the Lebanese Army in the Christian heartland.
Chmout massacre	April 22, 1979	Chmout, Jbeil	13	Kataeb Regulatory Forces	Marada Movement	False flag revenge for the Ehden massacre. Marada fighters disguised themselves in Kataeb uniforms and infiltrated a house in Chmout where a celebration was taking place, targeting Kataeb members.
West Beirut Massacre 1979	June 14, 1979	Hamra, Beirut	11	(Lebanon) Lebanese Christian civilians	Palestine Liberation Organisation and Lebanese National Movement	During a period of heightened tension along the Green Line, Joint Forces units conducted a series of house-clearing operations in the Hamra and Ras Beirut districts. Eleven Christian residents were pulled from their apartments and summarily executed. The ICTJ identifies this as part of the final homogenization of West Beirut, forcing the remaining Christian population to flee to the Eastern sector.
Sirjbal Siege	June, 1979	Sirjbal Chouf	2	(Lebanon) Lebanese Christians	Druze, (Palestine) Palestinians, Lebanese National Movement	This operation was a strategic military action aimed at clearing the "villages of the valleys" (al-Wadaya) to secure the Shuf road for the Joint Forces. Following the killing of two residents, approximately 500 Christians fled the seven surrounding villages toward Beirut's southeastern suburbs.
Ain Dara Executions	July, 1979	Ain Dara Chouf	5	(Lebanon) Lebanese Christians	Druze	A coordinated series of attacks on the entrances to the Shuf district. In Ain Dara, five residents were executed.
Dakoun Executions	July, 1979	Dakoun Aley	4	(Lebanon) Lebanese Christians	Druze	A coordinated series of attacks on the entrances to the Aley district. In Dakoun, four young men were singled out and killed.
Basta Bombing	October 27, 1979	West Beirut	8	Lebanese Civilians	Attributed to Syrian Intelligence or pro-Syrian factions (such as the (Palestine) As-Sa'iqa or the SSNP)	On October 27, 1979, a remote-controlled improvised explosive device (IED) containing 30 kilograms of TNT was detonated in the Basta district of West Beirut. The explosion occurred in a densely populated residential and commercial sector, specifically targeting the area adjacent to the headquarters of the Arab Lebanese Army (ALA). The blast killed at least eight civilians and wounded 32 others. The resulting fires caused extensive structural damage, destroying dozens of homes, storefronts, and civilian vehicles. Historians frequently cite the attack as an effort by Syrian-aligned factions to exert pressure on the ALA, a splinter group that often operated independently of Syrian military interests in the capital's western sectors.
Battle of Qnat	February 5–17, 1980	Qnat North Lebanon	50	(Lebanon) Lebanese Christians	Syrian Special Forces (supporting Marada interests)	Following Kataeb-Marada clashes, Syrian Special Forces launched a major offensive to occupy the strategic village of Qnat. The village was shelled and besieged for over 10 days during a period of extreme winter weather. The assault resulted in high civilian fatalities and forced thousands to flee through snow-covered mountains to escape the bombardment.
Assassination of Maya Gemayel	February 23, 1980	Achrafieh, East Beirut	8	(Lebanon) Lebanese Christians including Maya Gemayel (20 months old).	While no group successfully claimed responsibility at the time, historians and intelligence reports generally attribute the operation to the Syrian Social Nationalist Party (SSNP) or Syrian Intelligence, likely acting in coordination with the Marada Brigade as retaliation for the Ehden Massacre (1978).	A powerful car bomb, containing approximately 50 kg of TNT, was detonated in the heart of Ashrafieh as Bachir Gemayel's vehicle passed. Bachir was not in the car at the moment of the blast, but his toddler daughter, Maya, was killed instantly along with three of his security detail. Four other civilians in the vicinity also perished in the explosion, which caused extensive damage to the surrounding residential buildings.
Syrian Intelligence Assassination Wave	February 23 - July 23, 1980	East Beirut, West Beirut, Mount Lebanon	11	High-profile (Lebanon) Lebanese Christian politicians and journalists/ intellectuals of various backgrounds who opposed the Syrian occupation.	Syrian Intelligence Services (frequently acting through the Syrian Special Forces or local proxies such as Syrian Social Nationalist Party (SSNP).	Beyond large-scale military engagements, the year 1980 was marked by a systematic campaign of targeted assassinations attributed to Syrian Intelligence. This wave of violence specifically targeted the intellectual and political pillars of the Christian enclave and the independent press. By targeting figures like Camille Chamoun and journalists such as Salim al-Lawzi and Riad Taha, the campaign aimed to dissolve the internal cohesion of the Lebanese Front and eliminate voices calling for Syrian withdrawal.
Zahleh Car Bombing	March 6, 1980	Zahle	4	(Lebanon) Lebanese Christians	Syrian Armed Forces Arab Deterrent Force / Syrian Intelligence.	On March 6, 1980, a car bomb exploded in a civilian area of Zahleh, a strategically significant Christian-majority city in the Bekaa Valley. The blast killed four civilians and wounded two others. The attack occurred amidst escalating tensions between the city’s inhabitants and Syrian military forces stationed in the region. Analysts view this bombing as part of a broader campaign to destabilize Zahleh’s autonomy and pressure local leadership ahead of the full-scale military sieges that would follow in late 1980 and 1981.
Shamout House Party Massacre	April 22, 1980	Shamout North Lebanon	15	(Lebanon) Lebanese Christians - Unarmed civilians attending a private gathering.	Marada Movement	Marada militants attacked a private home during a party in Shamout. After opening fire on the guests, they abducted the survivors, transporting them through Batroun to Zgharta. At least 15 of the victims were eventually confirmed killed.
Burj al-Barajneh Clashes	May 28, 1980	Burj al-Barajneh West Beirut	15	(Palestine) Palestinians, Pro-Iraqi Ba'ath, LCP (Communists)	Amal Lebanese Shia Muslims	This event highlights the growing rift between the Shia Amal movement and the Palestinian-Leftist coalition. The fighting in the dense streets of Burj al-Barajneh marked the beginning of Amal's assertion of authority over the southern suburbs of Beirut. Casualties: 15 deaths; 30 wounded.
Mountain Purge	July, 1980	Matn District Aley	7	(Lebanon) Lebanese Christians	Druze, (Palestine) Palestinians, Lebanese National Movement	A coordinated series of killings targeting the remaining Christian presence in strategic mountain villages. The victims were often vulnerable residents who had stayed behind during previous waves of displacement, including a disabled person in Sirjbal. These killings were intended to intimidate the remaining Christian population into fleeing toward the "Eastern Zone" (East Beirut and Mount Lebanon proper), effectively "purging" these areas to secure military supply lines for the Joint Forces.
Safra massacre	July 7, 1980	Safra	83	National Liberal Party (Lebanon)	Kataeb Regulatory Forces	In a bid to "unify the Christian rifle," Kataeb "B-G" (Bachir Gemayel) units launched a surprise dawn raid on the headquarters and coastal strongholds of Dany Chamoun's Tigers Militia. The operation evolved into a localized purge; beyond the 20 combatants killed in the initial assault, dozens of NLP partisans and vacationing civilians were rounded up at the Safra beach resorts and executed. Forensic accounts and survivor testimonies described summary liquidations on the sand and the targeting of Chamoun loyalists in their homes. The event effectively ended the NLP's military relevance and consolidated total Maronite military authority under the Lebanese Forces command.
Ashrafieh/Bachir Gemayel Bombing	July 30, 1980	Achrafieh	5	(Lebanon) Lebanese Christians	Attributed to Syrian Intelligence or their proxies (potentially the SSNP)	A massive car bomb was detonated near the residence of Bachir Gemayel. While Gemayel himself was the intended target, the blast occurred in a densely populated residential street, causing the deaths of several neighbors and pedestrians. 5 civilians killed (including two women); 15 wounded. This was the second major attempt on his life and family that year, following the February bombing that killed his daughter, Maya.
Southern Lebanon War of the Schools	August 1980 – September 1980	Tyre and Nabatieh	~40	Amal Movement students and Shia educators	(Palestine) Palestinian Fatah and PFLP-GC	Following a series of strikes by Lebanese Shia students protesting PLO military presence in the South, Palestinian factions launched coordinated attacks on schools and educational centers in Tyre and Nabatieh. The violence involved the abduction of teachers and the shelling of school buildings where Amal-affiliated student groups were organizing. These events are highlighted by scholars as the "point of no return" for the Shia-Palestinian alliance in Southern Lebanon.
West Beirut War of the Apartments	August 1980 – April 1981	West Beirut	~150 (Cumulative)	Amal Movement and Shia civilians	Palestine Liberation Organization and pro-Palestinian militias	A series of violent protracted clashes erupted in West Beirut as the PLO sought to suppress the rising influence of the Amal Movement. Palestinian factions used heavy weaponry in densely populated residential areas to evict Shia families and secure strategic apartment rooftops. These "turf wars" resulted in high civilian casualties and were a primary driver of the urban Shia population's shift toward anti-Palestinian sentiment.
Zahrani Bridge Massacre	August 22, 1980	Zahrani, South Governorate	9	(Lebanon) Lebanese Christian civilians	Palestine Liberation Organisation Fatah	A civilian van traveling from Marjayoun toward Beirut was intercepted at a Fatah-controlled checkpoint near the Zahrani bridge. Nine passengers were identified by their sect and summarily executed. Historical records from the period indicate this was a deterrence killing aimed at preventing Christian residents of the South from maintaining transit links with East Beirut.
1980 Zahle Pre-Siege Shelling	December 22–24, 1980	Zahle, Beqaa Valley	numerous - undetermined	(Lebanon) Lebanese Christians	Syrian Armed Forces, Arab Deterrent Force	Following an ambush that killed five Syrian soldiers, the Syrian military launched a "punitive" bombardment of the city. After residents refused to hand over the LF members responsible, the city was shelled for 48 hours without interruption. This event served as the precursor to the major 1981 battle.
Hawsh al-Umara 1981 Shelter Massacre	December 22–24, 1980	Hawsh al-Umara, Zahle	30	(Lebanon) Lebanese Christians - primarily women & children	Syrian Armed Forces, Arab Deterrent Force	During the initial heavy bombardment of the 1981 siege, Syrian artillery struck a multi-story building in the Hawsh al-Umara district. The building collapsed onto its own shelter, killing 30 civilians who were seeking refuge. This incident is often cited as the deadliest single event of the three-month siege.
Nabi-Younes Roadblocks/ Identity Card Killings	January 1981	Jiyeh, Chouf District	~10	(Lebanon) Lebanese government employees and Amal/Shia civilians	(Palestine) Palestinian Fatah	In a series of extrajudicial "identity card killings," Fatah militants established mobile checkpoints near the Nabi-Younes shrine. Travelers identified as members of the Amal Movement or Lebanese state employees were targeted for abduction or summary execution. These actions were intended to sever the link between the capital and the Shia-majority South, contributing to the total collapse of security on the coastal highway.
Siege of Zahleh	March 31, 1981 – June 30, 1981	Zahle and surrounding Beqaa outskirts.	200	(Lebanon) Lebanese Christians	Syrian Armed Forces (supported by PLA units).	A three-month total blockade and bombardment of Lebanon's largest Christian city in the Beqaa. Syrian forces blocked all food and medical supplies, systematically targeting schools and hospitals. The battle notably drew in international actors, leading to the "Missile Crisis" when Israel shot down Syrian helicopters and Syria responded by deploying SAM-2 and SAM-6 missiles in the Beqaa. The siege ended following U.S.-led mediation by Philip Habib. Casualties: 200 civilians killed; 2,000+ injured.
Zahleh Spillover Shelling	April 2, 1981	East Beirut and West Beirut (near the Demarcation Line).	45	(Lebanon) Lebanese Christians	Syrian Armed Forces	As a reaction to the clashes in Zahleh, the Syrian military launched an intensive bombardment of East Beirut during peak business and school hours. In retaliation, the Lebanese Forces (LF) shelled Muslim-populated residential areas near the "Green Line." This single day of reciprocal shelling resulted in one of the highest civilian death tolls of the year in the capital. Casualties: 45 civilians killed; 200+ injured.
Red Cross Medics Executions	April 4, 1981	Zahle	3	(Lebanon) Lebanese Christians - Sister Marie-Sophie Zoghby, Khalil Saydah, and Salim Hammoud.	Syrian Armed Forces	Despite the Red Cross vehicle being clearly marked, it was targeted by intense Syrian fire while attempting to deliver bread and medicine to local hospitals. The death of Sister Marie-Sophie, a prominent nun and medical worker, caused significant international outcry and led to the brief opening of supply routes later that month.
Zahle Perimeter Massacre	April 4, 1981	Zahle Outskirts, Beqaa Governorate	13	(Lebanon) Lebanese Christian civilians	Syrian Army and Lebanese National Movement	During the Syrian siege of Zahle, thirteen Christian civilians from the surrounding agricultural hamlets were executed for attempting to smuggle food into the besieged city. Historical records indicate these executions were used as a deterrent to isolate the city from its rural hinterland.
Military Hospital and Baabda Offensive	April 6, 1981	Galerie Semaan, Hadath, and Baabda (Beirut suburbs)	10	(Lebanon) Lebanese Christians Lebanese Army	Syrian Armed Forces	Syrian forces targeted Lebanese Army positions, resulting in the partial destruction of the Military Hospital, specifically its emergency and operating facilities. The fighting expanded into the southern suburbs of Baabda and Hadath, where civilian residential blocks were caught in the crossfire of heavy artillery. Casualties: 10 civilians killed; 67 injured.
Northern Suburbs Bombardment 1981	May 10, 1981	Ajaltoun, Jounieh, Harissa, Beit Mery, and Ain Saadeh.	18	(Lebanon) Lebanese Christians	Syrian Armed Forces	Syrian artillery expanded its range beyond the city center to hit the northern and eastern mountain suburbs. These areas were previously considered relatively safe havens for displaced persons. The shelling of Jounieh and Harissa specifically targeted the infrastructure of the Maronite heartland. Casualties: 18 civilians killed; 170 wounded.
Zahlé Hospital Massacre	April 10, 1981	Zahlé	~15	(Lebanon) Lebanese Christian medical staff and wounded	Syrian Army	During the intense shelling and siege of Zahlé, Syrian commandos briefly breached the city's outskirts. Approximately 15 individuals, including medical personnel and wounded fighters in a makeshift clinic, were summarily executed. This event solidified the "resistance" identity of Zahlé and is a rare case where the ICTJ documents direct Syrian military summary executions during a formal siege.
May 18 Beirut Shelling	May 18, 1981	Throughout Beirut	25	(Lebanon) Lebanese Christians	Syrian Armed Forces	A renewed peak in hostilities led to widespread bombardment across the capital's residential sectors. This period of violence contributed to the mass exodus of approximately 100,000 civilians fleeing East Beirut toward the relative safety of the Metn mountains and the North. Casualties: 25 civilians killed; 118 wounded.
Halba Massacre	June 14, 1981	Halba, Akkar District	15–20	(Iraq) Pro-Iraqi Ba'athists and Sunni civilians	Syrian Armed Forces and ADP	A targeted political liquidation carried out by the Syrian military and its local proxies (the "Red Knights"). Following an assault on the local Ba'ath party headquarters, between 15 and 20 individuals were summarily executed. The ICTJ identifies this as part of Syria's broader campaign to eliminate Iraqi influence and independent Sunni leadership in North Lebanon.
Assassination of Louis Delamare	September 4, 1981	West Beirut	1	(France) French Diplomatic Corps (Ambassador to Lebanon)	Syrian intelligence and Iranian-backed Shia militants (Islamic Dawa Party/Amal elements)	Louis Delamare, the French Ambassador to Lebanon, was targeted in a broad-daylight ambush while commuting to his official residence in West Beirut. A white BMW carrying four armed operatives intercepted his Peugeot 604; when Delamare refused to exit the vehicle or unlock the doors during the attempted abduction, the gunmen opened fire through the rear passenger window before fleeing the scene. Delamare sustained fatal wounds to the head and torso. Investigative records and diplomatic archives indicate the operation was a joint geopolitical strike orchestrated by Syrian intelligence and Iranian-backed radical Shia factions—including elements of the Islamic Dawa Party—to retaliate against French regional policies and disrupt French diplomatic initiatives aimed at negotiating an autonomous Lebanese political settlement independent of Damascus.
Sidon Joint Forces Command Bombing	September 17, 1981	Sidon	21	(Palestine) PLO militants and armed factions	Front for the Liberation of Lebanon from Foreigners (FLLF)	A vehicle booby-trapped with 300 kilograms of TNT detonated directly in front of the regional headquarters of the PLO and the Lebanese Joint Forces in the southern port city of Sidon. The explosion caused massive structural damage, killing 21 people and wounding 96 others. The FLLF claimed immediate responsibility, framing the operation as a major strategic strike against foreign military strongholds dominating the southern sectors.
Chekka Cement Factory Bombing	September 18, 1981	Chekka	4	Pro-Syrian and pro-Palestinian transport workers	Front for the Liberation of Lebanon from Foreigners (FLLF)	A tactical bombing struck outside a major cement plant in the northern coastal town of Chekka, an industrial hub heavily frequented by individuals acting as transport agents for pro-Palestinian and pro-Syrian factions. The FLLF executed the operation to directly disrupt the logistical corridors used by foreign proxy networks operating outside of Beirut.
Hayy al-Salloum Car Bombing	September 19, 1981	Hayy al-Salloum, Southern Beirut	3	PLO/LNM Factional sympathizers and local civilians	Front for the Liberation of Lebanon from Foreigners (FLLF)	A vehicle rigged with explosives detonated in the southern Beirut suburb of Hayy al-Salloum. While Lebanese police reported the device detonated prematurely before reaching its ultimate tactical objective, the FLLF claimed the operation as a direct strike designed to penetrate and disrupt a hostile political stronghold in the capital's outskirts.
Fakhani PLO Headquarters Bombing	October 2, 1981	Fakhani, West Beirut	50+	Palestine Liberation Organization (PLO)	Front for the Liberation of Lebanon from Foreigners (FLLF)	A major operation targeted a high-density operational sector of the Palestine Liberation Organization (PLO) in West Beirut, specifically aimed at disrupting the command structure of PLO leader Abu Jihad. The explosion devastated the immediate vicinity of the PLO's administrative and intelligence offices. The blast killed at least 50 people and wounded more than 250 others. The FLLF claimed the operation as part of its broader campaign to dismantle the foreign military infrastructure dominating West Beirut.
East Saida Massacre	November 12, 1981	Saida Hinterland, South Governorate	14	(Lebanon) Lebanese Christian civilians	Palestine Liberation Organisation and Lebanese National Movement	During a military drive to secure the high ground east of Sidon, Joint Forces militants entered several small Christian hamlets. Fourteen residents were executed for collaboration with the state military. The ICTJ documents this as a strategic move to create a "security belt" around the Palestinian camps in Sidon prior to the anticipated Israeli offensive.
Sarafand Skirmish	December 15, 1981	Sarafand, Sidon District	~10	Shia villagers and Amal members	Palestine Liberation Organization (PLO)	A dispute over a Palestinian checkpoint in the village of Sarafand escalated into a deadly skirmish. PLO guerrillas opened fire on local Shia residents and members of the Amal Movement after a disagreement regarding the movement of local agricultural goods. The incident sparked a series of retaliatory kidnappings across the South.
Iraqi embassy bombing	December 15, 1981	Beirut	61	Iraqis & Lebanese	Islamic Dawa Party	A suicide car bomber detonated a vehicle packed with 100 kilograms of explosives outside the Iraqi embassy in Beirut, causing the building to collapse. The attack killed 61 people—including Iraqi Ambassador Abdul Razzak Lafta—and injured over 100 others. Executed during the Iran–Iraq War by the pro-Iranian Shi'ite insurgent group Islamic Dawa Party, the bombing is widely considered the first modern suicide car bombing in contemporary history.
Aley Hinterland Massacre	December 18, 1981	Aley District, Mount Lebanon Governorate	9	(Lebanon) Lebanese Christian civilians	PSP and Lebanese National Movement	In a move to consolidate control over the heights overlooking the Beirut–Damascus highway, PSP and LNM militants executed nine Christian residents across several small hamlets in the Aley hinterland. These targeted killings were used to intimidate the remaining Christian population into fleeing toward East Beirut before the 1982 Israeli invasion. The ICTJ notes this as part of a pre-emptive demographic shift in the Druze-majority district.
Ras el-Nabaa Checkpoint Massacre	January 24, 1982	Ras el-Nabaa, Beirut	11	(Lebanon) Lebanese Christian civilians	Palestine Liberation Organisation and Lebanese National Movement	During a breakdown in the local ceasefire, PLO and LNM militants operating the Ras el-Nabaa crossing point pulled eleven Christian civilians from their vehicles based on their religious identity cards. The victims were summarily executed in the ruins of the nearby commercial district. This event led to a multi-week closure of the Green Line crossings.
Chtaura PLO Command Bombing	January 28, 1983	Chtaura, Beqaa Valley	40	(Palestine) PLO and Fatah militants	Front for the Liberation of Lebanon from Foreigners (FLLF)	A high-yield car bomb successfully targeted and destroyed a regional operational headquarters utilized by the Fatah faction of the PLO in Syrian-controlled Chtaura. The massive explosion completely dismantled the facility, killing 40 personnel. The FLLF executed the deep-penetration strike as a major offensive action to break the external military infrastructure occupying the strategic Beqaa Valley.
Sidon Anniversary Clashes	April 13, 1982	Sidon, Sidon District	~30	Amal Movement members and Shia civilians	(Palestine) Fatah and pro-PLO militias	On the seventh anniversary of the Civil War, Fatah units engaged Amal in intense urban combat. The fighting involved the heavy use of artillery in densely populated civilian areas. This escalation was a decisive factor in the Shia community's subsequent neutrality or initial welcome of the Israeli invasion months later, as local residents sought an end to PLO military hegemony in the South.
West Beirut Anniversary Clashes	April 13, 1982	West Beirut, Beirut	~20	Amal Movement members and Shia civilians	(Palestine) Fatah and pro-PLO militias	Coinciding with the Sidon front, PLO factions launched an assault on Amal-held sectors of West Beirut. The exchange of heavy artillery and RPG fire in residential neighborhoods caused significant civilian casualties. The brutality of these clashes further alienated the urban Shia population, contributing to their initial welcome of the Israeli invasion and refusal to support Palestinian factions during the Siege of Beirut later that year.
Saghbine Massacre 1982	June 8, 1982	Saghbine, Western Beqaa District	14–20	(Lebanon) Lebanese Christian civilians	Palestine Liberation Organisation and Lebanese National Movement	As Israeli forces advanced through the Beqaa Valley, retreating PLO and LNM units entered the village of Saghbine. Between 14 and 20 Christian residents were summarily executed in what has been described as a "scorched earth" tactic. These actions are frequently contextualized as retaliatory measures against local populations perceived to be supportive of the invasion, occurring amidst a broader pattern of summary executions documented during the 1982 retreat in the Western Beqaa.
Disappearance of the Iranian Diplomats	July 4, 1982	Al-Barbara Checkpoint, Mount Lebanon Governorate	4 (disappeared)	(Iran) Iranian diplomats and staff	Undetermined. (Lebanon) Rogue Lebanese Forces elements (Attributed)	Four Iranian officials were intercepted at the Barbara checkpoint during the height of the Israeli invasion. While regional rivals attribute the event to a top-down LF directive, LF leadership has historically maintained that if the killings occurred, they were the result of rogue local elements operating without central command during the total collapse of state authority. Forensic certainty remains elusive, with competing claims that the victims were either liquidated on-site or transferred to third-party custody, a narrative the LF uses to highlight the "fog of war" and the lack of forensic proof linking the party's high command to the incident.
Lebanon Hostage Crisis	July 19, 1982 - December 4, 1991	West Beirut Beqaa Valley	Hundreds of Lebanese + at least 8 foreigners	104 foreign hostages including Americans, French, British & Soviets and many Lebanese intellectuals and academics.	Hezbollah operating under the front name Islamic Jihad Organization	A decade-long campaign of systematic abductions designed to force the withdrawal of Western forces from Lebanon and secure the release of Shia prisoners held abroad. Victims were often held in underground cells, blindfolded for years, and subjected to torture or mock executions. While most were eventually released through complex international negotiations (such as the Iran-Contra affair), several high-profile captives were murdered or died from medical neglect.
Assassination of Bachir Gemayel	September 14, 1982	Achrafieh	27	Bachir Gemayel & 26 other Lebanese Christians	Habib Shartouni, a member of the Syrian Social Nationalist Party (SSNP). Shartouni lived in the apartment above the headquarters and was recruited by Syrian Intelligence (specifically Nabil Alam) to plant the device.	On September 14, 1982, President-elect Bachir Gemayel was assassinated when a powerful bomb destroyed the Kataeb Party headquarters in Ashrafieh. The blast killed Gemayel and 26 others. The perpetrator was later identified as Habib Shartouni, a member of the Syrian Social Nationalist Party (SSNP) acting on behalf of Syrian intelligence. The assassination occurred only nine days before Gemayel's scheduled inauguration and triggered a chain of events.
Sabra and Shatila massacre	September 16, 1982	West Beirut	460–3,500	Palestinians and Lebanese Shia Muslims	Lebanese Forces (attack); Israel Defense Forces (support)	Following the assassination of President-elect Bachir Gemayel, the liquidation of the camps was directed by Elie Hobeika, head of the Lebanese Forces' autonomous intelligence unit (Jihaz al-Amn). The operation was driven by a "blood vengeance" doctrine for the 1976 Damour massacre, in which Hobeika’s family was killed. Evidence suggests Hobeika utilized his specialized "Security Agency" units to bypass the standard LF chain of command. While the IDF facilitated entry and provided perimeter illumination, Hobeika remained the primary architect of the systematic executions and subsequent use of bulldozers for mass burial.
Kfarnabrakh Funeral Attack	November 8, 1982	Kfarnabrakh Chouf District	20	(Lebanon) Lebanese Christians	Druze PSP	Militias attacked a funeral ceremony in the village, killing 11 civilians and wounding 11 others. Nine more were abducted and later found dead in a well. Around 20 houses were burned, including the home of the local priest.
First Tyre Headquarters Bombing	November 11, 1982	Tyre	91–103	(Israel) IDF personnel and Shin Bet agents	Ahmad Qasir (Hezbollah)	A suicide car bombing targeting the Israeli military headquarters in Tyre. A Peugeot laden with explosives was driven into the eight-story building, causing it to collapse completely. The attack killed 75 Israelis and roughly 15–28 Lebanese/Palestinian detainees. This is historically recognized by Hezbollah as their first major "martyrdom operation," carried out by 15-year-old Ahmad Qasir, though the group's involvement was not officially claimed until years later. It remains the deadliest single day for the Israeli security forces since the state's inception.
1982 Tripoli Black Friday Massacre	December 19, 1982	Tripoli	~50–70	Sunni civilians and Tawhid supporters	Syrian Armed Forces and ADP ("Red Knights")	One of the deadliest extrajudicial events in Tripoli's history. Following days of heavy street fighting between the pro-Syrian "Red Knights" and local Sunni Islamist groups, Syrian regular forces entered the city to "restore order." Forensic reports and academic sources document the summary execution of dozens of men in the Tebbaneh and Malloula districts. The massacre served to break the back of independent Sunni resistance to Syrian hegemony in Northern Lebanon.
Mountain war massacres	1983	South Mount Lebanon	1,500 - 3,500	(Lebanon) Lebanese Christians	Druze	Druze forces massacred hundreds of Christian civilians, ethnically cleansing South Mount Lebanon from Christian presence.
Palestine Research Center Operation	February 6, 1983	West Beirut	18	(Palestine) Palestinian researchers and personnel	Front for the Liberation of Lebanon from Foreigners (FLLF)	A powerful explosion targeted the multi-story headquarters of the Palestine Research Center in West Beirut. The center served as a prominent political and propaganda hub for the Palestinian national movement. The FLLF claimed responsibility for the strike, executing it as part of a post-1982 security sweep designed to permanently dismantle the remaining institutional and ideological footprints of foreign political organizations in the capital.
1983 US Embassy Bombing	April 18, 1983	Ain el-Mreisseh, Beirut	63	(United States) U.S. Embassy staff, CIA officers, and (Lebanon) Lebanese civilians	Hezbollah under the guise of Islamic Jihad Organization	A suicide delivery van carrying 900 kg of explosives detonated at the front of the embassy, causing the central wing of the seven-story building to collapse. The attack killed 17 Americans (including the CIA's top Middle East analyst, Robert Ames) and 32 Lebanese employees. The blast was the deadliest attack on a U.S. diplomatic mission to that date and signaled the beginning of the campaign to force the Multinational Force in Lebanon to withdraw from the country. U.S. intelligence later traced the financing and logistics of the attack to the Iranian embassy in Damascus.
Baalbek Garrison Sector Bombing	August 7, 1983	Baalbek, Beqaa Valley	30	Syrian military personnel and allied militia members	Front for the Liberation of Lebanon from Foreigners (FLLF)	A powerful vehicle bomb was detonated inside a heavily fortified military sector in Baalbek under the direct control of the Syrian army, killing approximately 30 personnel tied to the occupying forces. The FLLF claimed immediate credit for the operation, framing it as a major offensive strike to aggressively push back against foreign garrisons entrenched in the Lebanese interior.
Bmarian Massacre	August 31, 1983	Bmarian Aley District	65+	(Lebanon) Lebanese Christians	Druze	Occurred on August 31, 1983, while the village was under Syrian military control, before the Israeli withdrawal from the region. The massacre resulted in the death of over 65 Christian civilians, including the village priest and the mayor. While academic sources such as the ICTJ and Harris verify 31 summary executions, local records cite a total death toll exceeding 65. The village was largely destroyed during the attack.
Mrayjat Massacre	August 31, 1983	Mrayjat, Zahle District	10	(Lebanon) Maronite civilians	Druze PSP	Occurring days before the official outbreak of the Mountain War. Ten Christian commuters were pulled from their vehicles and executed. Harris cites this specific act of violence as the "psychological trigger" that convinced the Christian population in the Aley hinterland that no safety was possible under the PSP advance.
Bhamdoun Massacre 1983	September 4–6, 1983	Bhamdoun Aley District	384	(Lebanon) Lebanese Christians	Druze, PSP & (Palestine) Palestinian Militias	Following the Israeli withdrawal from the Aley district, Druze-led PSP forces supported by Palestinian militia elements overran the strategic mountain town. The ICTJ documents 384 fatalities during the takeover, which included summary executions of civilians and captured personnel. The event resulted in the complete destruction and looting of the town's Christian quarters.
Bireh Massacre 1983	September 5, 1983	Bireh Chouf District	~80	(Lebanon) Lebanese Christians	Druze	Part of the sectarian displacements in the Shouf during the Mountain War. Entire families were reportedly executed in their homes during the militia's advance into the village.
Abey Massacre	September 5, 1983	Abey, Aley District	20–30	(Lebanon) Lebanese Christian civilians	Druze PSP	During the retreat of the Lebanese Forces from the Aley heights, Druze PSP units overran the village of Abey, where many Christian families from surrounding hamlets had sought refuge. Between 20 and 30 individuals were executed in the village square. The ICTJ documents this as part of the systematic removal of the Christian presence from the "Mountain" districts.
Jwar al-Hawz and al-Abadieh Raids	September 5, 1983	Al-Abadieh and Jwar al-Hawz, Baabda District	8	(Lebanon) Maronite Christians	Druze PSP and allied militias	During the opening days of the "War of the Mountain" following the Israeli military withdrawal, Druze-led PSP forces overran the adjacent villages of Jwar al-Hawz and al-Abadieh. The ICTJ documents the execution of eight Christian civilians during the security sweep of the area. The raids contributed to the wider flight and displacement of the Christian population from the upper Baabda and Aley sectors.
Capture of Kfarmatta	September 5, 1983	Kfarmatta Aley District	107	Druze	(Lebanon) Lebanese Armed Forces & Lebanese Forces	Following the Israeli withdrawal from the Aley district, the Lebanese Forces (LF) and elements of the Lebanese Army's 8th Brigade entered the village. The occupation resulted in the deaths of 107 Druze civilians, including a local religious leader, before the village was retaken by PSP forces the following day.
Salimeh Massacre	September 6, 1983	Salima Baabda District	30+	(Lebanon) Lebanese Christians	Druze PSP	Following the takeover of the Baabda heights, Druze militias entered the mixed village of Salimeh. Reports detailed the execution of civilian residents and the systematic destruction of Christian-owned property.
Ras el-Matn Massacre	September 6, 1983	Ras el-Matn Baabda District	~40	(Lebanon) Lebanese Christians	Druze PSP	Part of the sectarian displacements in the Upper Metn. After the withdrawal of official state forces, local militias conducted "cleansing" operations, leading to localized executions and the permanent flight of the Christian minority.
Kfarmatta Massacre	September 6, 1983	Kfarmatta Aley District	172	(Lebanon) Lebanese Christians	Druze, PSP	Following the Israeli withdrawal from the Aley district, Druze-aligned militias overran the village. While international reports verify approximately 100 summary executions, local records and community sources cite up to 172 fatalities, including the elderly and children.
Aley Highland Massacre	September 6, 1983	Aley, Mount Lebanon Governorate	14	(Lebanon) Lebanese Christian civilians	Druze, PSP	During the collapse of the Lebanese Forces' defensive line in the Aley district, PSP units executed fourteen civilians in the surrounding hamlets. The victims were primarily elderly residents who had remained behind during the mass exodus toward East Beirut. The ICTJ identifies this as a "securing operation" to prevent any Christian return to the strategic heights overlooking the Beirut–Damascus highway.
Majd el-Meouch Massacre	September 6–10, 1983	Chouf District	~50-60	(Lebanon) Lebanese Christians	Druze, PSP & (Palestine) Palestinian militias	Following the Israeli withdrawal from the Chouf, Druze PSP militias supported by Palestinian PFLP-GC elements overran the village. Between 50 and 60 Christian civilians were killed. The ICTJ documents this as a joint operation between local Druze and Palestinian militia units.
Beiteddine Massacre	September 8, 1983	Beiteddine Chouf District	30-35	(Lebanon) Lebanese Christians	Druze PSP	Following the withdrawal of Israeli forces, Druze militias overran the historic town and committed a systematic liquidation of remaining residents and captured Lebanese Forces (LF) members. Among the victims were at least five elderly civilians over the age of 75, who were unable to flee.
Burjayn Massacre	September 9, 1983	Bourjein Chouf District	19	(Lebanon) Lebanese Christians	Druze PSP	After the village fell to Druze militias, nineteen individuals, consisting of both local civilians and captured Lebanese Forces members, were summarily executed.
Maaser El-Chouf Massacre 1983	September 9, 1983	Maaser el-Chouf Chouf District	63	(Lebanon) Lebanese Christians	Druze PSP	Occurred following the Israeli withdrawal from the Chouf district. According to the ICTJ mapping, 63 Christian residents were killed in their homes by members of the Progressive Socialist Party (PSP) militias. The event is documented as a targeted sectarian violation during the early stages of the Mountain War.
Maasser Beit ed-Dine Massacre	September 11, 1983	Maasser Beit ed-Dine, Chouf District	21	(Lebanon) Lebanese Maronite Christians	Druze PSP	A significant liquidation in the village of Maasser Beit ed-Dine. Following the collapse of the local defense, Druze PSP units executed 21 Christian civilians, including women and three children. This event is forensically distinct from the killings in the neighboring town of Beiteddine days earlier and was part of the systematic campaign to ensure no Christian presence remained in the Chouf heartland.
Rishmayya Massacre	September 16, 1983	Rechmaya, Aley District	39	(Lebanon) Lebanese Maronite Christians	PSP Druze Militias	One of the bloodiest single-day liquidations in the Aley district during the Mountain War. Following the retreat of the Lebanese Army and LF, 39 Maronite civilians were murdered. The scale of the killing in Rishmayya was intended to decapitate the local Christian social structure, facilitating the long-term annexation of the district by the PSP.
Ammiq Massacre	September 19, 1983	Aammiq, West Bekaa District	14	Christian civilians	Druze PSP and LNM elements	As Christian refugees fled the collapsing front lines in the Chouf, a group was intercepted in the Bekaa village of Ammiq. Fourteen men were separated from their families and summarily executed. This event is cited as a primary factor in the total "locking" of the mountain passes, preventing any return of the displaced for decades.
Deir el-Qamar Perimeter Massacre 1983	October 1983	Deir el-Qamar, Chouf District	11	(Lebanon) Lebanese Christian civilians	Palestine Liberation Organisation & PSP Druze	During the months-long siege of Deir el-Qamar, Joint Forces units operating the perimeter checkpoints executed eleven civilians caught attempting to bypass the blockade for supplies. Historian William Harris notes these "attrition executions" were used to maintain psychological pressure on the tens of thousands of displaced Christians sheltered within the town.
Tripoli Communist Purge	October 11–19, 1983	Tripoli	50-100	Lebanese Communist Party	Islamic Unification Movement (Tawheed)	Following the departure of PLO factions, Tawheed forces seized control of the city and systematically targeted secular rivals. Militiamen occupied party offices and reportedly executed dozens of members, often forcing them to renounce their political beliefs before killing them.
1983 Beirut barracks bombing	October 23, 1983	Beirut	307	Americans, French and Lebanese	Hezbollah under the guise of Islamic Jihad Organization	Victims were mostly American Marines.
Second Tyre Headquarters Bombing	November 4, 1983	Tyre	60	(Israel) IDF and Border Police	Hezbollah under the guise of Islamic Jihad Organization	Almost a year to the day after the first attack, a truck laden with explosives drove into an IDF Border Police base in Tyre. The explosion killed 28 Israelis and 32 Lebanese prisoners. Following the attack, the IDF conducted massive sweeps and airstrikes in the Beqaa Valley. This second bombing solidified the shift in the conflict from a conventional war against the PLO to an asymmetrical war against Iranian-backed Shia insurgent groups.
Beddawi Internal Purge	November 14–16, 1983	Beddawi, Tripoli	~30	Palestinian and Lebanese civilians	(Palestine) Palestinian PFLP-GC, (Palestine) Fatah al-Intifada & Syrian Armed Forces	During the final assault on the Arafat-led PLO stronghold in Tripoli, pro-Syrian Palestinian factions (Fatah al-Intifada and PFLP-GC) supported by Syrian units overran the Beddawi camp. The ICTJ documents the summary execution of approximately 30 individuals, including suspected loyalists and non-combatants, during the camp's clearing phase.
Chyah District Bombing	December 5, 1983	Chyah, Southern Beirut	12	Amal Movement militia personnel and civilian sympathizers	Front for the Liberation of Lebanon from Foreigners (FLLF)	A powerful vehicle bomb exploded in the dense Chyah quarter of Beirut's southern suburbs, an active frontline zone housing fortified installations of the Amal Movement militia. The tactical strike resulted in 12 fatalities. The FLLF claimed responsibility for the action, executing it to directly degrade the operational capabilities of the Amal militia and its local support networks, which were actively cooperating with foreign Syrian occupiers to subvert control of the capital.
Iqlim al-Kharrub Coastal Massacre	January 1984	Jiyeh and Rmeileh, Chouf District	30-40	(Lebanon) Lebanese Christian civilians	Amal, PSP	During the military drive to secure the coastal highway between Beirut and Sidon, PSP and Amal units conducted summary executions of Christian civilians, including sixteen residents who were attempting to flee the area by sea. The ICTJ identifies this as a critical event in the total demographic cleansing of the Iqlim al-Kharrub coast, which had previously been a mixed sectarian zone.
West Beirut Intifada (6 February Uprising)	February 6, 1984	West Beirut	~200-300	(Lebanon) Lebanese Army, Lebanese Christians	Amal, PSP	Following the collapse of the Lebanese Army's 4th Brigade, Amal and PSP militias took control of West Beirut. Reports surfaced of summary executions of surrendered soldiers and "liquidations" of political rivals.
Chiyah/Ain el-Remmaneh Border Executions	February 6–10, 1984	Chiyah–Ain El Remmaneh Border, Beirut	18	(Lebanon) Lebanese Christian civilians	Amal and Lebanese National Movement	During the February 1984 Intifada in West Beirut, Amal and LNM units seized the southern suburbs and moved to clear the Green Line interface. Eighteen Christian civilians were pulled from their apartments or intercepted at the Mar Mikhail and Chiyah checkpoints and summarily executed. The ICTJ documents these as part of a campaign to ensure the "total sectarian homogeneity" of the southern approaches to the capital.
Kfar Zabad Massacre	March 14, 1984	Kfar Zabad, Beqaa Governorate	9	(Lebanon) Lebanese Christian civilians	Amal, PSP	As Druze and Shia militias moved to establish a land corridor between the Chouf and the Beqaa, nine residents of Kfar Zabad were summarily executed. The victims were accused of being "LF stay-behinds." This incident is cited by the ICTJ as part of the final demographic consolidation of the Beqaa-Chouf border regions.
Sohmor Ambush	September 19, 1984	Sohmor, Western Beqaa Valley	4	South Lebanon Army (Druze members from Rashaya)	Shia resistance (Amal or Islamic Resistance (Hezbollah))	Four Druze members of a Rashaya-based SLA patrol were killed in a targeted ambush by Shia resistance elements near the village of Sohmor. The attack, part of a localized campaign against the SLA's presence in the Western Beqaa, triggered a total breakdown of militia discipline and led directly to a mass reprisal against the village's civilian population the following day.
1984 Sohmor massacre	September 20, 1984	Sohmor	13	Shia men (suspected partisans)	South Lebanon Army / Israel Defense Forces (perimeter support)	In the wake of a deadly ambush on an SLA patrol by Shia insurgents that claimed the lives of several Druze members, SLA units entered the village of Sohmor—identified as a base for partisan operations—to conduct a security reprisal. The SLA framed the resulting kinetic engagement, which led to 13 deaths, as a direct response to the persistent guerrilla threat and the targeting of their personnel by insurgent forces. Historian Harris (2012) contextualizes the event within the intense sectarian friction of the Southern "Security Zone," where the SLA served as the primary buffer against local provocations.
Kfar Houna Massacre 1985	January 26, 1985	Kfar Hounah, Jezzine District	8	(Lebanon) Lebanese Christian civilians and SLA recruits	Hezbollah	During the initial clearing of the Jezzine corridor following the partial Israeli withdrawal from the Sidon area, Hezbollah militants overran a local post in Kfar Houna. Eight individuals, including off-duty SLA members and civilians accused of "intelligence cooperation," were summarily executed. This event served as a definitive warning to the residents of the Jezzine bridge against cooperating with the SLA administration.
South Lebanon Secular Purge	1985 – 1988	Tyre and Nabatieh hinterlands	~15–20	Lebanese Communist Party and LNRF cadres	Hezbollah	As Hezbollah sought to establish a monopoly over the "Islamic Resistance" in the South, they conducted a series of summary executions targeting local Lebanese Communist Party (LCP) organizers and resistance fighters. These killings often occurred in the aftermath of joint operations or in villages where the LCP maintained a strong historical presence. The ICTJ documents this as a strategic effort to dismantle rival non-religious resistance structures.
1985 Beirut car bombing	March 8, 1985	Bir al-Abed, Beirut	80–193	Hezbollah Followers of Muhammad Husayn Fadlallah and Shia civilians	undetermined	A massive car bomb (approx. 200 kg of dynamite) targeted the residence of Shia cleric Sayyed Mohammad Hussein Fadlallah. Though the cleric escaped injury, the blast leveled two 7-story buildings and a cinema, killing scores of worshippers. Investigative journalist Bob Woodward later reported that CIA Director William Casey authorized the hit with Saudi funding, though the CIA officially denied direct involvement.
Jiyeh massacre 1985	March 1985	Jiyeh, Chouf District	15–20	(Lebanon) Lebanese Christian civilians	PSP, Amal, & PLO	Following the IDF withdrawal from the Sidon district, a coalition of the PSP, Amal, and Palestinian factions moved to secure the coastal corridor. The takeover resulted in the summary execution of approximately 15 to 20 Christian residents who had remained in the town. This event marked the final, total displacement of the Christian population from Jieh and the permanent demographic alteration of the coastal Iqlim al-Kharrub region.
East Sidon (Saida) Massacre 1985	April 24–28, 1985	Saida Hinterland, South Governorate	~80–100	(Lebanon) Lebanese Christian civilians	Amal, PSP and Popular Nasserite Organization	Following the withdrawal of the Lebanese Forces from the Sidon area, a coalition of Amal, PSP, and Nasserite militias overran several Christian villages (including Mieh Mieh and Darb es-Sim). Approximately 80–100 civilians were summarily executed during the initial entry. The ICTJ documents this as the event that caused the permanent displacement of nearly 50,000 Christians from the Sidon district toward the Jezzine enclave.
Kfar Falous Massacre	April 28, 1985	Kfar Falous, Jezzine District	14	(Lebanon) Lebanese Christian civilians	Amal and PSP	Following the fall of the Sidon hinterland, joint Amal and PSP units overran the village of Kfar Falous. Fourteen civilians, including elderly residents who had refused to flee, were summarily executed. This event marked the beginning of the "Jezzine Enclave" period, where the district became isolated from the rest of Mount Lebanon.
Iqlim al-Kharrub Massacre	April 28, 1985	Various villages including Joun and Barja	~60–100	(Lebanon) Lebanese Christian civilians	PSP and Amal	Following the fall of the Sidon hinterland, joint PSP and Amal units conducted a rapid sweep through the Christian villages of the Iqlim al-Kharrub. The most intense summary executions occurred on April 28 in villages like Joun, where elderly residents who remained behind were targeted. This resulted in the total exodus of the Christian population from the district toward the Jezzine enclave
War of the Camps	May 1985	West Beirut	3,781	Palestinians	Amal, Syrian Armed Forces	Sabra, Shatila and Burj el-Barajneh Palestinian refugee camps were besieged and bombed by the Shi'ite Amal militia, with Syrian Army support. 6,787 injured. Some activity occurred after May 1985
West Beirut Apartment Massacres	May 1985	Hamra and Mousaitbeh, West Beirut	12	(Lebanon) Lebanese Christian civilians	Amal Movement	During the height of the "War of the Camps," Amal security units conducted a targeted purge of the remaining Christian residents in West Beirut. Twelve individuals were pulled from their apartments and executed in alleyways or basements. The ICTJ notes that these killings were intended to send a final signal that the Western sector was no longer a "mixed" area, leading to the total exodus of the Christian professional class from the district.
Shatila Internal Executions	May 19–21, 1985	Shatila, Beirut	~30	Palestinian and Lebanese civilians	(Palestine) Palestinian PFLP-GC & (Palestine) Fatah al-Intifada	In the opening days of the War of the Camps, pro-Syrian Palestinian factions (PFLP-GC and Fatah al-Intifada) carried out a series of summary executions within the Shatila camp targeting those suspected of loyalty to the Arafat-led PLO. The ICTJ identifies approximately 30 victims during this internal purge, which preceded the larger Amal offensive.
Gaza Hospital Executions	May 22, 1985	Shatila Camp, Beirut	~30	Palestinian wounded and medical staff	Amal Movement	Amal militants overran the Gaza Hospital in the Shatila camp. Approximately 30 individuals, including wounded combatants and civilian medical personnel, were pulled from their beds and summarily executed. This event is a primary case study in the ICTJ report regarding the targeting of medical facilities during the intra-Muslim conflicts of the mid-1980s.
Shatila Suicide Attack	May 28, 1985	Shatila refugee camp, Beirut	dozens	Amal Movement militants and Shia civilians	(Palestine) Palestinian female suicide bombers	During the first phase of the War of the Camps, four young female Palestinian suicide bombers (referred to as "human bombs" by camp defenders) targeted Amal Movement positions surrounding the Shatila camp. The attack was intended to break the month-long siege and resulted in heavy casualties among the Shia militiamen and civilians in the adjacent neighborhoods.
Burj el-Barajneh Internal Purge	June 3–5, 1985	Burj el-Barajneh, Beirut	~25	Palestinian and Lebanese civilians	(Palestine) Palestinian PFLP-GC & (Palestine) Fatah al-Intifada	During the initial phases of the War of the Camps, pro-Syrian Palestinian factions (Fatah al-Intifada and PFLP-GC) conducted systematic clearing operations within Burj el-Barajneh. Approximately 25 civilians and suspected Arafat loyalists were executed. The ICTJ identifies these as distinct from the subsequent combat deaths during the Amal siege.
Shelling of the Southern Suburbs (Dahieh)	June 1985 – July 1985	Dahieh, Beirut	~150	Shia civilians	(Palestine) PLO factions	In response to the Amal Movement's siege of the camps, Palestinian factions launched indiscriminate artillery and mortar fire from within Shatila and Burj el-Barajneh into the surrounding Lebanese residential neighborhoods. These "breakout shellings" targeted civilian areas in the southern suburbs of Beirut, leading to hundreds of Lebanese casualties and the mass displacement of Shia families. This period marked a peak in inter-communal hostility, as the violence transcended militia combat to target non-combatant residents.
Amhaziyeh Massacre	August 12, 1985	Labweh–Amhaziyeh, Baalbek District	6	(Lebanon) Lebanese Christian civilians	Syrian Social Nationalist Party SSNP	Six Christian civilians were intercepted and kidnapped by SSNP militants while traveling through the Amhaziyeh area near Labweh. Their bodies were discovered several days later in a remote area of the northern Beqaa. The ICTJ documents this as a targeted execution intended to discourage Christian travel between the Beqaa and Mount Lebanon.
Sohmor Summary Executions	September 20, 1985	Sohmor, Western Beqaa District	13	Local Shia secularists and individuals from neighboring Sunni and Druze communities who were members of the LCP	Hezbollah	Following a series of clashes over the control of the strategic Qaroun Lake region, Hezbollah militants overran the village of Sohmor. Thirteen individuals—a mix of local Shia secularists accused of SLA affiliation, and individuals from neighboring Sunni and Druze communities who were members of the Lebanese Communist Party (LCP)—were rounded up and summarily executed. This incident was a turning point in the Western Bekaa, establishing Hezbollah as the sole military authority in the region over secular rivals.
South Lebanon Executions	1985–1990	Various villages in South Governorate and Nabatieh Governorate	~40–50 (cumulative)	Lebanese civilians	Hezbollah	Throughout the late 1980s, Hezbollah security units conducted a series of extrajudicial executions in villages bordering the "Security Zone." Victims were often abducted and executed without trial based on allegations of providing information to the SLA or Israel. These killings were used as a primary tool for establishing social and political control in the Southern hinterland.
Mashghara Ideological Purge	February 15, 1986	Mashghara, Western Beqaa District	8	Shia and Melkite Greek Catholic (LCP and SSNP members)	Hezbollah	In the months following the Sohmor executions, Hezbollah security units targeted the remaining secular resistance cells in the neighboring town of Mashghara. Eight individuals were executed after being pulled from their homes; the victims included both Shia members of the Lebanese Communist Party and local Christians from the SSNP. Forensics and local accounts indicate these were "point-blank" liquidations meant to finalize the removal of non-religious political entities from the "Resistance" corridors leading to the South.
Assassination of Khalil Na'ous and Suppression of LNRF Cadres	February 20, 1986	Beirut & South Lebanon Governorate	Multiple	Communist / Secular resistance fighters	Hezbollah	During Hezbollah's campaign to consolidate control over anti-occupation resistance operations, prominent Lebanese Communist Party (LCP) and Lebanese National Resistance Front (Jammoul) intellectuals and fighters, including LCP Central Committee member Khalil Na'ous, were targeted in a series of systematic assassinations designed to force secular groups out of the southern front.
Assassination of Suhail Tawileh	February 24, 1986	West Beirut, Beirut	1	Civilian (Journalist & LCP Central Committee member)	Hezbollah	Suhail Tawileh, editor-in-chief of the Lebanese Communist Party newspaper Al-Nidaa and member of the party's Central Committee, was abducted and assassinated in West Beirut during the systematic campaign targeting secular political leadership.
Zoukak el-Blat Massacre	February 24, 1986	Zuqaq al-Blat, Beirut	7	(Lebanon) Lebanese Christian civilians	Amal Movement	In an effort to secure the rear-lines of the Green Line interface, Amal militants executed seven elderly Christian residents of the Zoukak el-Blat neighborhood. The victims had ignored several eviction notices issued by the militia. This incident is cited in local histories as the final closing of the sectarian corridor between the downtown commercial district and the southern suburbs.
Labweh Road Massacre	March 27, 1986	Labweh, Baalbek District	9	(Lebanon) Lebanese Christian civilians	Syrian Social Nationalist Party	A civilian bus traveling toward the Christian village of Al-Qaa was intercepted at an SSNP-controlled checkpoint near Labweh. Nine passengers were identified as Christians and summarily executed on the roadside. This event is cited in regional histories as a definitive move by the SSNP to consolidate control over the Beqaa's international highway, leading to a total blockade of the Northern Beqaa road for several months.
Jounieh Bombing	April 8, 1986	Jounieh, Keserwan District	10	(Lebanon) Lebanese Christian civilians	Unknown (attributed to pro-Syrian factions)	A 100 kg TNT car bomb exploded in the busy northern coastal suburb of Jounieh during the morning rush hour. The attack targeted a commercial district in the Christian heartland, killing 10 and wounding 114. It was part of a series of tit-for-tat urban bombings designed to destabilize the East Beirut security zone.
Mashghara Expulsion and Demographic Displacement	June 5, 1986 – June 15, 1986	Mashghara, Western Beqaa District	Multiple	(Lebanon) Lebanese Christian civilians	Hezbollah	Following an influx of approximately 500 external Hezbollah fighters into the mixed town of Mashghara under the guise of Al-Quds Day, heavy clashes erupted between the Islamist faction and the secular Syrian Social Nationalist Party (SSNP), whose local ranks were heavily drawn from Mashghara's Christian families. Upon capturing the town and establishing a permanent military barracks, Hezbollah forces executed a systematic campaign of intimidation, including burning ancestral homes and seizing property. This targeted pressure culminated in a rapid three-wave exodus of the town's Christian population—which historically comprised roughly 50% of Mashghara's 20,000 residents—effectively completing a campaign of forced demographic displacement and sectarian consolidation.
Bekaa Valley Clan Purge	August 12, 1986	Baalbek, Beqaa Governorate	14	Shia civilians and rival clan members	Hezbollah	In a move to consolidate control over the northern Bekaa, Hezbollah security units conducted a series of raids against local clans (specifically the Hamadi and Dandash networks) that resisted the group's administrative oversight. Fourteen individuals were summarily executed in the outskirts of Baalbek. While framed as a tribal feud, the ICTJ identifies this as a strategic operation to eliminate traditional secular Shia power structures in favor of the new clerical leadership.
Battle of Maghdouche	November 24, 1986 – December 1986	Maghdouche, Sidon District	~100+	Amal Movement and Shia civilians	(Palestine) Palestinian Fatah and pro-Arafat militias	In a major strategic offensive during the War of the Camps, Palestinian militias launched a breakout from the Sidon camps and captured the strategic hilltop town of Maghdouche from the Amal Movement. The offensive involved heavy street fighting and resulted in the displacement of thousands of Shia residents. This event is cited by historians as a rare instance during the war where Palestinian forces conducted a sustained territorial conquest outside of the refugee camps, leading to a humanitarian crisis for the local Lebanese population.
Assassination of Husayn Muruwwa	February 17, 1987	West Beirut, Beirut	1	Civilian (Marxist philosopher & LCP intellectual)	Hezbollah	Husayn Muruwwa, a 78-year-old Marxist philosopher and editor of the Lebanese Communist Party journal Al-Thaqafa al-Jadida, was assassinated in his home in West Beirut during a wider campaign targeting secular intellectuals.
Fathallah Barracks Massacre	February 24, 1987	Basta, West Beirut	23–27	Hezbollah militants and supporters	Syrian Army	Following a clash where a Syrian soldier was wounded, 7,000 Syrian commandos stormed the Fathallah Barracks (Hezbollah's then-HQ). At least 23 men and 4 women were taken prisoner and summarily executed by Syrian forces. This event caused massive tension between Iran and Syria and forced Hezbollah to move its operations into the "security squares" of the Southern Suburbs. It is often cited as the bloodiest confrontation between the "Resistance" and its Syrian backers.
Assassination of Mahdi Amel	May 18, 1987	West Beirut, Beirut	1	Civilian (Marxist philosopher & LCP Central Committee member)	Hezbollah	Dr. Hassan Hamdan (known by his pen name Mahdi Amel), a prominent Marxist philosopher and central committee member of the Lebanese Communist Party, was assassinated on Algeria Street in West Beirut.
Assassination of Rashid Karami	June 1, 1987	Airborne (near Halat)	1	Rashid Karami	Syrian Intelligence (attributed)	Prime Minister Rashid Karami was killed by a remote-controlled bomb while traveling in a Lebanese Army helicopter. Following the Syrian takeover of Lebanon, the case was weaponized to dismantle the Lebanese Forces (LF). LF leader Samir Geagea was convicted in a 1999 show trial widely condemned by human rights groups as a politically motivated fabrication by the Syrian-led security apparatus. Following the Cedar Revolution and the withdrawal of Syrian troops in 2005, the Lebanese Parliament formally acknowledged the injustice, granting Geagea a full pardon and exoneration. Historians now point to Syrian intelligence as the likely architect, aiming to eliminate a premier who sought independence and to provide a pretext for the imprisonment of the Syrian regime's primary Christian rival.
War of the Shia Brothers	April 1988 – November 1990	Dahieh Southern Lebanon	2500-3000	Shia Muslims	Hezbollah, Amal	A violent struggle for leadership within the Shia community involving house-to-house urban combat and heavy artillery duels in mountain villages. It was marked by summary executions and "identity card" killings.
Siddiqine Purge	April 1988	Siddiqine, Tyre District	8	Amal Movement sympathizers	Hezbollah	As the intra-Shiite conflict spread to the South, Hezbollah militants targeted the village of Siddiqine, a known Amal stronghold. Eight civilians and local officials were executed after being accused of "betraying the resistance." This incident triggered a wave of displacement of Amal-aligned families from the Tyre hinterland toward the coast.
Jibsheet Liquidations	April 14, 1988	Jibsheet, Nabatieh Governorate	15	Amal Movement "Security" members	Hezbollah	As Hezbollah seized control of Jibsheet, they conducted a targeted cleansing of the village's internal security apparatus. Fifteen members of Amal’s local intelligence and policing units were summarily executed. This purge was intended to demonstrate total administrative control over the symbolic heart of the southern resistance movement.
Ouzai and Ghobeiry Executions	May 6–10, 1988	Ouzai and Ghobeiry, Beirut Southern Suburbs	~20	Amal Movement members and civilians	Hezbollah	Hezbollah forces overran several Amal strongholds in the Southern Suburbs. In the aftermath of the fighting in Ouzai and Ghobeiry, approximately 20 individuals—including surrendered Amal fighters and local civilian sympathizers—were summarily executed in building entrances and street corners. These killings were used to establish Hezbollah's total control over the southern approaches to Beirut.
Haret Hreik Purge	May 11–31, 1988	Haret Hreik, Beirut	23	Amal Movement officials and fighters	Hezbollah	Following the fall of Ghobeiry, Hezbollah shifted its focus to the "Security Square" of Haret Hreik. This period was characterized by targeted liquidations of Amal's local organizational infrastructure. According to the ICTJ Mapping Project, at least 23 individuals were summarily executed during this phase as Hezbollah established its permanent headquarters in the district. This entry marks the final transition of the Dahieh into a Hezbollah-controlled enclave.
Ouzai Clinic Executions	May 12, 1988	Ouzai, Beirut	~10	Wounded Amal Movement captives and medical staff	Hezbollah	During the final push toward the coastal Ouzai district, Hezbollah militants overran a makeshift medical point treating Amal casualties. Approximately 10 individuals, including immobilized wounded fighters and auxiliary staff, were reportedly taken out and executed. This incident is historically significant as it marked the breach of informal "humanitarian zones" that had previously existed between the two Shia factions.
Adloun Coastal Purge	May 18, 1988	Adloun, South Governorate	8	Shia (Amal local cadres)	Hezbollah	As Hezbollah moved along the coastal road toward Tyre, they overran the Amal position in Adloun. Eight local officials were reportedly executed on the spot. Forensic reports from the time noted that the victims were shot in a cluster, indicating a summary execution rather than combat deaths.
Tayyibe Purge	May 23–25, 1988	Tayyibe, South Governorate	5	Shia (Traditionalist civilians)	Hezbollah	Following the takeover of Tayyibe, Hezbollah militants targeted the extended family of traditional local leaders (Za'ims) who had historically opposed the group's ideological shift. Five family members were summarily executed in the village center as a public warning against maintaining ties to pre-war political dynasties. This was part of a broader "de-feudalization" campaign in the South.
Harouf Summary Executions	May 24, 1988	Harouf, Nabatieh Governorate	6	Shia (Amal local cadres)	Hezbollah	Immediately following the Fall of Nabatieh, Hezbollah security units entered Harouf to identify and detain Amal's local organizational leads. Six individuals were reportedly taken to the outskirts of the village and summarily executed. Forensic evidence suggested they were executed at close range. This liquidation was part of a broader strategy to eliminate middle-management within the Amal Movement’s southern infrastructure.
Jibsheet Executions 1988	May 25, 1988	Jibsheet, Nabatieh Governorate	4	Shia (Pro-Amal civilians)	Hezbollah	While Jibsheet was a Hezbollah stronghold, several families remained loyal to the secular leadership of the Amal Movement. During a "security clearing" operation on May 25, four individuals from these families were executed after being accused of providing intelligence to Amal forces during the siege of Nabatieh. This incident solidified the village as the ideological heart of the Hezbollah resistance by removing all internal opposition.
Doueir Village Purge	May 26, 1988	Doueir, Nabatieh Governorate	7	Shia (Amal members and neutral notables)	Hezbollah	In the final days of the May offensive, Hezbollah units overran Doueir. Seven people were killed in what witnesses described as a "house-by-house" search for Amal sympathizers. The victims included local notables who had attempted to maintain a neutral stance between the two factions. This purge completed the "cleansing" of the central Nabatieh corridor, leaving it entirely under Hezbollah control.
Mashghara Massacre	June 22, 1988 – June 24, 1988	Mashghara, Western Beqaa District	11	(Lebanon) Lebanese Greek Catholic and Shia civilians	Hezbollah	In the aftermath of a failed attempt by the Lebanese Army to mediate between rival Shia factions, Hezbollah units entered the village of Mashghara. Eleven people were killed in a series of targeted raids. The victims included local Christian elders and Shia families who had remained loyal to the secular state apparatus. The event is cited by the ICTJ as an example of "intimidation through liquidation" to force village compliance with the new militia order.
Habbouch Summary Executions	September 22, 1988	Habbouch, Nabatieh District	11	Local Shia civilians and suspected rivals (Amal sympathizers)	Hezbollah	Following a local uprising against Hezbollah's security restrictions in the Nabatieh region, militant units rounded up eleven local residents in Habbouch. The victims were accused of maintaining ties to rival secular parties and were executed in a public display to deter further dissent in the region.
Baalbek-Nabi Othman Purge	January 7–10, 1989	Baalbek and Nabi Othman	~14	Amal Movement local officials	Hezbollah	While the main front of the "War of the Brothers" raged in the South, Hezbollah units in the Bekaa conducted a preemptive purge to prevent an Amal counter-offensive. Local records and contemporary press reports detail the abduction and execution of roughly 14 Amal officials from their homes in Nabi Othman and the outskirts of Baalbek. These liquidations effectively neutralized Amal’s presence in the Northern Bekaa.
Jibsheet Prison Execution	January 9, 1989	Jibsheet, Nabatieh District	7	Amal Movement captives	Hezbollah	Following a local skirmish in the Nabatieh region, Hezbollah militants executed seven members of the Amal Movement who were being held as captives in a temporary detention facility in Jibsheet. This incident was cited by Amal leadership as a "war crime" during the subsequent ceasefire negotiations in Damascus.
Jarjouaa Massacre	February 1, 1989	Jarjouaa, Nabatieh Governorate	12	Amal Movement captives and local villagers	Hezbollah	During a brief lull in the fighting for the Iqlim al-Tuffah highlands, Hezbollah militants overran an Amal position in Jarjouaa. Twelve individuals, including fighters who had surrendered and several local residents accused of harboring them, were reportedly executed in the village square. This event is cited in regional histories as the catalyst for the total militarization of the Iqlim al-Tuffah villages.
Siege of the Jiyeh Seaport	March 1989 – September 1989	Jiyeh, Chouf District	90+	(Lebanon) Civil and military non-combatants	Syrian Army, PSP, & Amal	As part of the "War of Liberation," the Lebanese Armed Forces under General Michel Aoun established a naval blockade of the PSP-controlled port at Jieh. This triggered a sustained period of collective violence involving heavy artillery exchanges between state forces and a coalition of the Syrian Army, PSP, and Amal Movement. The conflict resulted in at least 90 fatalities and extensive destruction of the town’s infrastructure.
Assassination of Hassan Khaled	May 16, 1989	West Beirut	10	(Lebanon) Hassan Khaled and 9 civilians	Largely attributed to Syria	The Grand Mufti of the Sunni community, an outspoken critic of the Syrian military presence, was killed by a massive car bomb in West Beirut. His assassination removed a powerful moderate voice from the political scene just months before the Taif Agreement.
Assassination of René Moawad	November 22, 1989	Raml al-Zarif, Beirut	18	(Lebanon) René Moawad and his entourage	Attributed to Syria	President René Moawad was killed by a 250 kg car bomb on Lebanon’s Independence Day, just 17 days after being elected. The explosion occurred as his motorcade passed through West Beirut. His death was seen as a message to those seeking to implement the Taif Accord independently of Syrian oversight.
Aitit Massacre	January 1, 1990	Aitit, Tyre District	17	Hezbollah (Civilians and militants)	Amal	A key event in the "War of the Brothers" for control of the South. Following a surprise assault on the village, Amal militants executed 17 individuals associated with Hezbollah, including non-combatant supporters. The massacre triggered a wave of retaliatory assassinations across West Beirut and South Lebanon, leading to the eventual Syrian-mediated ceasefire between the two Shia factions.
Barja Massacre 1990	January 15, 1990	Barja, Mount Lebanon Governorate	9	Sunni (Local political activists)	Hezbollah	As Hezbollah secured the coastal supply lines between Beirut and the South, they conducted a series of raids in Barja. Nine local activists, primarily associated with secular Arab nationalist parties, were detained and executed. This was part of a strategic move to ensure that no unreliable Sunni elements could interfere with the group's southern logistics.
Kfarshima Massacre	January 31, 1990	Kfarshima, Baabda District	~20–25	(Lebanon) Lebanese Maronite Christians (Civilians and LF supporters)	(Lebanon) Lebanese Armed Forces (Aounist units)	During the outbreak of the "War of Elimination" between the Lebanese Army (Aoun) and the Lebanese Forces (LF), Aounist units overran LF-controlled sectors in Kfarshima. Forensic reports and witness testimonies document the summary execution of approximately 20–25 individuals, including LF members who had surrendered and several civilians caught in the crossfire or targeted for their political affiliations. The event marked the beginning of a brutal three-month conflict that devastated the Christian enclave.
Kfar Melki Massacre	July 16, 1990	Kfar Melki, Sidon District	18	Amal Movement members and civilians	Hezbollah	In one of the final large-scale atrocities of the intra-Shia war, Hezbollah units overran Kfar Melki. Eighteen people were killed, with reports from the Lebanese Red Cross indicating that many were executed at close range after the fighting had subsided. This incident led to a massive wave of displacement toward Sidon and was a primary reason for the eventual Syrian-mediated reconciliation between the two groups.
Ain Qana Executions	July 16, 1990	Ain Qana, Nabatieh Governorate	12	Shia (Amal Movement captives)	Hezbollah	During the initial surge into the Iqlim al-Tuffah highlands, Hezbollah units overran the strategic village of Ain Qana. Twelve Amal fighters who had surrendered after the collapse of their defensive perimeter were reportedly taken to a local schoolyard and summarily executed. This incident marked the beginning of the "War of the Ridges," where Hezbollah utilized elite "Special Force" units to liquidate local Amal leadership in the mountains.
Jarjouaa Square Massacre	July 18, 1990	Jarjouaa, Nabatieh Governorate	15	Shia (Amal members and civilian loyalists)	Hezbollah	Following a 48-hour bombardment, Hezbollah militants seized the village of Jarjouaa. Witnesses and human rights observers documented the execution of 15 individuals in the central village square. The victims included both combatants and local civilians accused of acting as "spotters" for Amal's artillery. The public nature of the execution was intended to force the remaining Amal-loyal villages in the Iqlim to surrender without further resistance.
Arabsalim Executions	July 20, 1990	Arabsalim, Nabatieh Governorate	8	Shia (Amal local cadres)	Hezbollah	In the aftermath of the breakthrough at Ain Qana, Hezbollah "security committees" moved into Arabsalim to consolidate control. Eight local Amal officials were identified using local informants and executed behind the village’s main mosque. This purge targeted the administrative and logistical "nervous system" of the Amal Movement in the central Iqlim.
Dahr al-Wahsh massacre	October 13, 1990	Dahr al-Wahsh, Aley	~240	(Lebanon) Lebanese Armed Forces (Prisoners of war)	Syrian Armed Forces and Elie Hobeika's Militia	A specific theater of the October 13 collapse. After a local ceasefire, Lebanese soldiers who had surrendered were reportedly stripped to their shorts, bound with wire, and executed with shots to the head. Forensic evidence from the Lebanese Red Cross and witness accounts from the Baabda governmental hospital confirmed that many bodies showed signs of mutilation and point-blank trauma.
October 13 massacre	October 13, 1990	Baabda, Yarze, Metn District, Beirut	740–940	(Lebanon) Lebanese Armed Forces (LAF) and Christian civilians	Syrian Armed Forces and allied militias (PSP/Waad)	2000+ injured. Following the Syrian storming of the Presidential Palace and the Ministry of Defense, hundreds of Lebanese soldiers and Christian civilians were killed by Syrian forces after surrender. This event marked the official end of the Lebanese Civil War and the beginning of the Syrian hegemony. Victims included "human shield" protesters at the palace and soldiers who had ceased fire following General Aoun's radio address.
Bsous Massacre	October 13, 1990	Bsous, Aley District	15–20	Christian civilians and surrendered soldiers	Syrian Army and Syrian Social Nationalist Party (SSNP)	Following the collapse of the Aoun government, Syrian forces and SSNP militants entered the village of Bsous. Between 15 and 20 individuals, including elderly residents and soldiers who had laid down their arms, were summarily executed in their homes or in the village square. This incident is documented by the ICTJ as part of the final "pacification" of the Metn and Aley districts marking the end of the Civil War.
Hadath Massacre	October 13, 1990	Hadath, Baabda District	10–12	(Lebanon) Lebanese Christian civilians	Syrian Army and Syrian Social Nationalist Party	Following the official surrender of General Michel Aoun's forces, Syrian units and SSNP militants entered the residential areas of Hadath. Between 10 and 12 Christian civilians were summarily executed in their homes or building entrances during the final advance on the Baabda Palace. The ICTJ documents this as a distinct incident of extrajudicial killing that occurred after the cessation of active hostilities.
Wadi Chahrour Massacre	October 13, 1990	Wadi Chahrour, Baabda District	~15	(Lebanon) Lebanese Maronite civilians	Syrian Armed Forces	During the final assault on the Aounist enclave, Syrian regular forces entered private residences in Wadi Chahrour and executed approximately 15 civilians. Unlike the soldiers in Dahr el-Wahsh, these victims were non-combatants killed in a "mopping up" operation. Forensic witness accounts from Baabda Hospital confirm the arrival of these civilian corpses alongside the executed military personnel.
Tidman Massacre	October 13, 1990	Tidman, Chouf District	12	(Lebanon) Lebanese Maronite Christians	Syrian Armed Forces	During the final Syrian offensive to oust Michel Aoun, Syrian troops entered the village of Tidman. Forensic evidence from the ICTJ confirms the summary execution of 12 Christian civilians in their homes. This occurred simultaneously with the larger massacres in Bahr el-Ahmar and Dahr el-Wahsh, serving as a final "cleansing" of the Chouf/Aley border areas before the war's official end.
Bahr el-Ahmar Massacre	October 13, 1990	Bahr el-Ahmar, Aley District	15	(Lebanon) Lebanese Maronite Christians	Syrian Armed Forces	During the final Syrian offensive to oust the interim government of Michel Aoun, Syrian regular troops entered the village and executed 15 Christian civilians. The massacre occurred alongside similar liquidations in Tidman and the execution of surrendered soldiers in Dahr el-Wahsh. These events are cited as a final settling of scores by Syrian Intelligence before the official implementation of the Taif Agreement.

== Syrian Hegemony period (1990–2005) ==
Name	Date	Location	Deaths	Victims	Perpetrators	Notes
Menyara Border Massacre	October 14, 1990	Menyara, Akkar District	7	Christian civilians	Syrian Army and SSNP	In the immediate aftermath of the fall of the Baabda Palace, Syrian units and SSNP militants conducted a localized purge in the Akkar border town of Menyara. Seven Christian residents were executed for "collaboration" during a house-to-house search operation. This is historically cited as one of the final acts of summary execution before the official end of the civil war.
Assassination of Dany Chamoun	October 21, 1990	Baabda, Mount Lebanon	4	(Lebanon) Dany Chamoun and family	Widely attributed to Syrian Intelligence)	Following the surrender of Michel Aoun, gunmen in camouflage uniforms entered Chamoun's home and executed him, his wife Ingrid, and two of their sons, Tarek (5) and Julian (7). Only his infant daughter Tamara survived. The execution of a major Maronite leader in his own home sent shockwaves through the Christian community.
Hezbollah-Syrian Transnational Abductions	1990 - 2005	Throughout Lebanon	~640 to 1,200 documented individuals (presumed dead)	Lebanese Citizens	Hezbollah, Syrian Intelligence	Between 1990 and 2005, during the period of Syrian military presence in Lebanon, a campaign of enforced disappearances targeted Lebanese citizens and political activists. Human rights groups such as SOLIDE and ICTJ estimate that between 640 and 1,200 individuals were abducted by groups controlled by Hezbollah and Syrian intelligence. Many of these victims were reportedly transferred to detention centers in Syria, and in the absence of evidence of life, are presumed deceased.
Assassination of Hussein al-Sherif	September 14, 1991	Baalbek, Beqaa Governorate	1	Shia (Amal Movement Official)	Hezbollah (Attributed)	Hussein al-Sherif, a senior security official for the Amal Movement in the Bekaa, was assassinated in a professional ambush. Forensic details noted the use of silenced small arms, a hallmark of the "technical liquidations" that defined the early 1990s. His death signaled the end of Amal's military autonomy in the northern Bekaa, forcing the remaining cadres to accept the security dominance of Hezbollah and Syrian Intelligence.
Assassination of Mustafa Jeha	January 15, 1992	Sabtiyeh, Beirut	1	(Lebanon) Mustafa Jeha (Writer/Philosopher)	Unidentified gunmen (Attributed to Syrian-backed factions)	A prominent intellectual and critic of the clerical regime in Iran and the Syrian presence in Lebanon. He was shot in his car by masked gunmen.
Assassination of Abbas al-Musawi (Hezbollah Secretary General)	February 16, 1992	Jibchit / Siddiqine	3	Hezbollah	(Israel) Israeli Air Force	In a targeted decapitation strike, Israeli Apache helicopters fired Hellfire missiles at a motorcade in Southern Lebanon, liquidating the Hezbollah Secretary-General alongside his family. The operation was a response to the "Night of the Pitchforks" and represented a strategic shift toward high-tech extrajudicial killings of political leadership. While forensically successful in neutralizing the target, Harris (2012) notes that the strike resulted in strategic blowback by facilitating the rise of the more militarily capable Hassan Nasrallah.
Assassination of Nadim Abdel Nour	May 3, 1992	Achrafieh, Beirut	1	(Lebanon) Nadim Abdel Nour (Engineer and political activist)	Syrian Intelligence (Mukhabarat) / Pro-Syrian gunmen	A targeted assassination of a prominent anti-occupation activist. Abdel Nour was intercepted by gunmen while accompanied by his five-year-old son; he reportedly ordered the child to flee and requested the gunmen not to fire in his presence before being struck by multiple gunshots. The incident is documented as part of a campaign of liquidations against Christian opposition figures following the Taif Agreement.
Baalbek Hunger Protest Shootings	May 6, 1992	Baalbek, Beqaa Governorate	4	Shia (Protesters and bystanders)	Hezbollah / Syrian-backed Security Units	During a massive demonstration against the collapse of the Lebanese Pound and the resulting famine-level food prices, security forces and local militia elements opened fire on protesters near the city center. Forensic evidence and witness testimonies identified the use of rooftop snipers. Four individuals were killed, and dozens were wounded. The incident was a strategic application of force to prevent the economic grievances of the Shia heartland from evolving into a political rebellion against the new Syrian-led administrative order.
Assassination of Dr. Hikmat al-Amin	June 3, 1992	Tyre (Sour)	1	Shia (Doctor and critic)	Hezbollah	Dr. Hikmat al-Amin, a prominent physician and vocal secular critic of Hezbollah’s growing administrative dominance in the South, was shot dead by partisans. Forensic reports indicated a targeted assassination intended to silence independent voices within the Shia community during the transition to a post-war political order.
Boutros Khawand Abduction	September 15, 1992	Horch Tabet, Beirut	1 (disappeared)	LF Political Bureau Member	Syrian Intelligence	A high-ranking political figure kidnapped in broad daylight near his home. He was reportedly taken to the Mazzeh Prison in Damascus and remains "disappeared" to this day.
Tobacco Farmers Liquidations	1993–1995	South Governorate and Beqaa Governorate	~12–15	Shia (Union leaders and independent farmers)	Hezbollah Security Wing	Following the end of the Civil War, Hezbollah sought to consolidate control over the tobacco industry—a vital source of income for the Shia peasantry. Local farmers and unionists who protested the group's "Regie" (tobacco monopoly) pricing or who attempted to maintain ties with secular agricultural unions were targeted. Notable cases involved the abduction and subsequent disappearance of local leaders in Nabatieh and Hermel. Forensic reports on recovered bodies from this era showed evidence of interrogation under torture. These liquidations effectively silenced rural dissent and ensured the peasantry's economic total dependence on the group.
Farmers Purge of the South	1993–1996	Nabatieh Governorate & Western Beqaa District	8+	Shia (Independent unionists & LCP members)	Hezbollah Security Wing	Following the end of the Civil War, Hezbollah’s internal security apparatus (the Amn) conducted a series of liquidations targeting leaders of the independent tobacco and citrus unions. Forensic data on bodies recovered in the late 1990s showed signs of "systematic interrogation" prior to execution. These hits targeted secular Shia who refused to integrate their local political networks into the "Resistance" administrative hierarchy, effectively ending non-clerical political life in rural South Lebanon.
Assassination of Naeb Maaytah	January 29, 1994	Beirut	1	Jordanian Diplomat	Hezbollah (Attributed)	Naeb Imran Maaytah, the first secretary at the Jordanian embassy, was shot and killed in his vehicle. Investigations by Jordanian and Lebanese security pointed to a Hezbollah-aligned cell targeting Arab diplomats who were perceived as supporting regional peace negotiations with Israel that the group opposed.
1994 Saydet al-Najat Church bombing	27 February 1994	Zouk Mikael, Keserwan District	11	(Lebanon) Lebanese Maronite Christians	Syrian Intelligence (attributed)	A bomb detonated during Sunday Mass at the Saydet al-Najat church, killing 11 and wounding dozens. The Syrian-backed government immediately utilized the tragedy as a pretext to dissolve the Lebanese Forces (LF) and arrest Samir Geagea. While the Syrian-led judiciary blamed the LF, the party and independent observers maintain the bombing was a "false flag" orchestrated by Syrian intelligence services. The goal was to criminalize the Christian resistance and justify the total Syrian hegemony over Lebanon. Following the 2005 withdrawal of Syrian forces, the trial was widely discredited as a political fabrication intended to decapitate the Maronite political leadership.
Nabatieh SLA-Civil Staff Massacre	August 4, 1994	Nabatieh Periphery	11	SLA Civil Administration staff	Hezbollah	In a targeted operation against the SLA's administrative infrastructure, Hezbollah commandos ambushed a transport vehicle carrying civilian staff working for the SLA's Civil Administration near the Nabatieh front line. Eleven staff members were killed in what Hezbollah described as a strike against the "collaborationist apparatus." Human Rights Watch documented the event as a significant escalation in the targeting of non-combatant administrative personnel during the 1985–2000 conflict.
Assassination of Suheil al-Tawila	February 24, 1995	Beirut	1	Shia (Journalist and activist)	Hezbollah (Attributed)	Suheil al-Tawila, a writer for the Communist newspaper Al-Nida and a prominent critic of the clerical takeover of the Shia community, was abducted in Beirut and executed. His body was found in the Ouzai district. The assassination was a technical liquidation of the intellectual opposition that remained in West Beirut after the Civil War.
Assassination of Sheikh Nizar Halabi	August 31, 1995	Beirut	1	Sunni (Head of the Al-Ahbash group)	Osbat al-Ansar (with suspected Syrian/Hezbollah coordination)	Sheikh Nizar Halabi, the leader of the pro-Syrian Al-Ahbash (Association of Islamic Charitable Projects), was shot dead while leaving his home. The perpetrators were identified as members of Usbat al-Ansar, a radical Salafist group based in the Ain al-Hilweh camp. Forensic investigations revealed a highly professional hit using automatic weapons. While Al-Ahbash was pro-Syrian, Halabi's moderate Sufi-inspired influence was seen as a threat to both radical Salafism and the ideological hegemony of the "Resistance" camp within the Sunni community. Three of the gunmen (Munir Salah Abboud, Khalid Muhammad Hamed, and Ahmad al-Kassem) were later executed by the state in 1997.
Mansouri attack	April 13, 1996	Mansouri	6	Shia Muslims	Israel Defense Forces	During Operation Grapes of Wrath, an Israeli helicopter fired a missile at an ambulance transport, killing six civilians. The IDF maintained that the vehicle was being utilized by Hezbollah militants as cover for transport—a claim central to the forensic debate over the "human shield" doctrine in high-intensity conflict. The incident remains a key case study in the extrajudicial targeting of medical assets based on contested battlefield intelligence.
Nabatieh Fawka attack	April 16, 1996	Nabatieh Fawka	9	Shia Muslims	Israel Defense Forces	During Operation Grapes of Wrath, an Israeli helicopter fired precision missiles at a residential building, liquidating nine people. The IDF characterized the strike as a necessary response to Hezbollah mortar fire originating from the village, asserting that militants utilized the civilian structure as a "human shield" to complicate Israeli targeting. Forensically, the event is defined by the total demolition of a non-combatant dwelling based on contested intelligence, serving as a primary case study in the extrajudicial impact of urban "counter-battery" fire during the occupation era.
Qana Massacre 1996	April 18, 1996	Qana	106	Shia Muslims	Israel Defense Forces	During Operation Grapes of Wrath, an IDF artillery battery fired a barrage at a location identified by radar as a source of mortar fire targeting an Israeli special forces unit. According to the Israeli military, Hezbollah militants had utilized the immediate vicinity of the United Nations compound as a firing position to shield their assets among 800 sheltering civilians. The resulting hit on the compound caused 106 deaths and left approximately 116 others injured, including four UN peacekeepers. The IDF maintained the subsequent hit on the compound was a technical error caused by "erroneous data" and mapping discrepancies rather than a deliberate liquidation of a UN site.
Sidon Judges Massacre	June 8, 1999	Saida Criminal Court	4	Lebanese Judges	Hezbollah-linked militants (Asbat al-Ansar overlap)	Four judges (Hassan Uthman, Assem Bou Daher, Walid Harmoush, and Imad Shehab) were shot to death while presiding over a trial in the South Lebanon Criminal Court. While the gunmen were linked to Palestinian extremist factions, later intelligence reports and the ICTJ mapping project indicate the operation was coordinated through local security networks to undermine the Lebanese state's authority in the South.
Assassination of Colonel Aql Hashem	January 30, 2000	Outside Debel, Southern Lebanon	1	South Lebanon Army (SLA) military command	Hezbollah	A highly coordinated, remote-controlled bomb successfully targeted and eliminated Colonel Aql Hashem, the operational chief and second-in-command of the South Lebanon Army (SLA), at his farm infrastructure outside Debel. Hashem, who was sentenced to death in absentia by a Lebanese military court for his direct administrative and military collaboration with foreign occupying forces, served as the primary linchpin for day-to-day proxy operations in the southern security zone. Hezbollah claimed immediate responsibility for the strategic operation, broadcasting technical reconnaissance and detonation footage via its media apparatus.
May 2000 South Lebanon Massacres	May 2000	Various villages in the Security Zone	~15–20 (targeted)	SLA members and alleged collaborators	Hezbollah	During the rapid Israeli withdrawal in May 2000, Hezbollah units conducted targeted liquidations of individuals identified as high-ranking SLA intelligence officers or "notorious" collaborators. While the group officially handed over 1,500 SLA members to the Lebanese state, local reports from villages like Marjayoun and Khiam detailed several summary executions of those captured in the field before formal surrender could be arranged.
Assassination of Elie Hobeika	January 24, 2002	Hazmieh, Beirut	4	(Lebanon) Elie Hobeika and 3 bodyguards	Unknown. Attributed to Syrian Intelligence	A targeted car bombing that eliminated a major Syrian asset who had become a political liability. While pro-Syrian outlets blamed Israel to disrupt the Belgian legal case regarding Sabra and Shatila, security analysts note the blast occurred in a high-security zone under total Syrian control. Damascus had a clear motive to silence Hobeika—who possessed extensive knowledge of Syrian-directed war crimes—while using his death to manufacture a diplomatic crisis for the Ariel Sharon government.
Ramzi Irani Execution	May 7, 2002	Hamra	1	(Lebanon) Lebanese Forces student activist (Christian)	Hezbollah-linked security apparatus	Ramzi Irani, a prominent LF student leader, was abducted in broad daylight in West Beirut. His body was found weeks later in the trunk of his car. The ICTJ and human rights groups cite this as a definitive post-war summary execution used to intimidate the Christian student movement during the Syrian occupation period.
Osbat al-Nour Leadership Ambush	May 17, 2003	Ain al-Hilweh Camp, Sidon	1	Osbat al-Nour extremist leadership	(Palestine) Fatah	A tactical ambush targeted the vehicle of Abdullah Shraidi, the commanding official of the al-Qaeda-linked extremist faction Osbat al-Nour, as he traveled through the Ain al-Hilweh camp. Operatives from the nationalist Fatah movement executed the close-quarters strike with automatic weapons to eliminate the hardline commander following a string of provocative security violations in the sector. Shraidi sustained severe, ultimately fatal wounds in the engagement. The targeted elimination triggered an immediate, heavy armed counter-offensive across the urban camp sectors as Fatah security forces moved to neutralize the remaining extremist strongholds.
Neutralization of PFLP-GC Military Chief, Jihad Ahmed Jibril	May 20, 2002	Mar Elias, West Beirut	1	(Palestine) PFLP-GC military command	Unknown	A 2 kg TNT booby-trap explosive device detonated beneath the driver's seat of a vehicle in the busy Mar Elias commercial sector of West Beirut, successfully eliminating Jihad Ahmed Jibril, the chief of the military wing and designated successor of the pro-Syrian Popular Front for the Liberation of Palestine – General Command (PFLP-GC). The precise targeted explosion occurred the moment Jibril turned the vehicle's ignition key. The operation systematically degraded the frontline command structure of a radical proxy group heavily backed by regional external actors, with the executing operators managing to withdraw from the capital completely undetected.
Operation of Unit 121 (The Assassination Cell)	2004–2008	Beirut, Lebanon	Multiple	Lebanese	Hezbollah (Unit 121)	Forensic evidence provided by the Special Tribunal for Lebanon (STL) identified "Unit 121" as a specialized Hezbollah assassination squad. Using a series of encrypted color-coded phone networks (Blue, Green, Yellow, and Red), the unit conducted surveillance and executed high-profile political figures. The unit's lead operative, Salim Ayyash, was convicted for the 2005 Hariri bombing. The discovery of these networks remains the definitive forensic link between the group's central command and the 2004–2008 liquidation campaign.
Assassination of Pierre Boulos	May 2, 2004	Gemmayzeh, Beirut	1	(Lebanon) Maronite Christian / Lebanese Forces (LF) student leadership	Attributed to Syrian Intelligence	The body of Pierre Boulos, the former chairman of the student branch of the outlawed Lebanese Forces (LF), was discovered inside the trunk of his abandoned vehicle outside the Gemayze Hospital. Boulos, an active organizer within the Christian nationalist student underground opposed to the foreign military presence in Lebanon, had been abducted two days prior by an unidentified operational cell. The targeted execution took place during an era of systemic crackdowns by the ruling Syrian-backed security apparatus designed to silence anti-occupation dissent across the capital's universities.
Assassination of Ghaleb Awwali	July 19, 2004	Mouawad District, Beirut	1	Hezbollah military operational command	Mercenary network led by Nasser Nader	A precision explosive device detonated inside the vehicle of Ghaleb Awali, a senior Hezbollah military official, as he entered his car outside his residence in the Mouawad sector of Beirut's southern suburbs. Awali was a specialized security operative responsible for coordinating and financing frontline Palestinian insurgent logistics against foreign defense networks. While a regional extremist cell briefly issued an anomalous claim of responsibility, a subsequent Lebanese military judiciary investigation officially indicted and convicted a domestic network of mercenary assets, led by Nasser Nader, a Shia from Southern Lebanon, for executing tactical surveillance and planting the device on behalf of external handlers.
Assassination Attempt on Marwan Hamadeh	October 1, 2004	Ras Beirut, Beirut	1	Druze (Bodyguard/ Sergeant)	Hezbollah (Unit 121 / Salim Ayyash)	As MP Marwan Hamadeh’s Mercedes was driving near the American University of Beirut (AUB), a parked vehicle containing approximately 10–15 kg of TNT was detonated via remote control. Hamadeh and his driver sustained severe injuries, but survived. His bodyguard, Sergeant Ghazi Abu Karroum, was killed instantly. Forensic analysis conducted by the Special Tribunal for Lebanon (STL) linked the cell phones used to coordinate the hit to the same "Blue Network" used by Hezbollah operative Salim Jamil Ayyash in the subsequent Hariri assassination. This event is historically classified as the first in the "Cedar Revolution" wave of assassinations.
Rafic Hariri Bombing	Feb 14, 2005	Beirut	22	Former Prime Minister Rafic Hariri, his security detail, and bystanders in a busy commercial district.	Hezbollah	A massive suicide truck bomb containing over 2,000 kg of explosives was detonated as Hariri’s motorcade passed. The blast was so powerful it left a crater 10 meters wide and destroyed multiple surrounding buildings, causing high civilian casualties. Casualties: 22 deaths; 226 wounded. Location: St. George Hotel area, Beirut, Lebanon. Perpetrators: Hezbollah (Specifically Salim Ayyash of "Unit 121," as determined by the Special Tribunal for Lebanon).

== Modern Era (2005 - Present) ==
Name	Date	Location	Deaths	Victims	Perpetrators	Notes
Samir Kassir Assassination	June 2, 2005	Ashrafieh, Beirut	1	Samir Kassir (Journalist)	Hezbollah / Syrian Intelligence	A car bomb was detonated under the vehicle of Samir Kassir, a leading anti-Syrian journalist and historian, in the heart of East Beirut. This was the first in a series of targeted liquidations of intellectuals following the withdrawal of the Syrian army. The STL and local investigators link the professional nature of the hit to Hezbollah's Unit 121-aligned security networks.
George Hawi Assassination	June 21, 2005	Wata el-Muaitbeh, Beirut	1	George Hawi (Politician)	Hezbollah / Syrian Intelligence	Just weeks after Samir Kassir, George Hawi was killed by a remote-controlled bomb placed under his passenger seat. As a former leader of the LCP, his death marked the final purge of the old secular "leftist" guard that refused to align with the Syrian-Iranian axis. The assassination is documented as a move to consolidate control over West Beirut's political dissent.
Attempted Assassination of May Chidiac	September 25, 2005	Jounieh, Mount Lebanon Governorate	0 (1 injured)	(Lebanon) Civilian (Journalist & TV Anchor)	Unknown (suspected pro-Syrian elements)	Prominent television anchor and journalist May Chidiac survived a targeted car bomb attack in Jounieh, suffering severe injuries. The attack drew widespread international criticism regarding the targeting of press figures in post-Syrian withdrawal Lebanon.
Gebran Tueni Bombing	December 12, 2005	Beirut	4	Christians. Gebran Tueni (MP and Editor of An-Nahar), his driver, his bodyguard, and one bystander.	Hezbollah	A parked car containing 40 kg of explosives was detonated as Tueni’s armored vehicle passed. The blast occurred in a busy industrial/commercial area, causing significant injuries to nearby civilians and structural damage to surrounding buildings. Casualties: 4 deaths; 32 wounded. Location: Mkalles, Eastern Beirut. Perpetrators: Hezbollah (Unit 121).
Assassination of Mahmoud al-Majzoub	May 26, 2006	Sidon	2	(Palestine) Palestinian Islamic Jihad (PIJ) command	Mercenary cell led by Mahmoud Rafeh	A highly targeted, remote-controlled explosive device concealed inside a vehicle door detonated in Sidon, eliminating Mahmoud al-Majzoub, a senior commander and Shura Council member of Palestinian Islamic Jihad (PIJ), alongside his brother Nidal. Majzoub operated as a critical strategic liaison coordinating logistics between Palestinian factions, Hezbollah, and Iranian security elements. While the Israeli government issued a formal diplomatic denial of involvement, a subsequent Lebanese military intelligence investigation dismantled the local executing apparatus, resulting in the formal conviction of former police official Mahmoud Rafeh (a local Druze asset) for running a clandestine espionage cell that managed the field reconnaissance and execution under the direct administration of Israeli intelligence (Mossad) handlers.
2006 War - Indiscriminate Fire & Human Shielding	July 12 - Aug 14, 2006	Southern Lebanon, Beqaa Valley, Dahieh	43 Israeli civilians and ~1,109 Lebanese civilians	Lebanese civilians, Israeli Civilians	Hezbollah	During the 34-day conflict, Hezbollah launched approximately 4,000 Katyusha rockets and other projectiles into civilian population centers in Northern Israel. Human Rights Watch investigated the attacks and concluded they were "indiscriminate" and, in many cases, deliberate attacks on civilians, constituting war crimes. Reports from the UN and human rights groups noted that Hezbollah frequently stored weaponry in residential buildings and launched rockets from the immediate vicinity of civilian homes and shelters. By failing to distinguish themselves from the civilian population and utilizing civilian infrastructure for military purposes, Hezbollah violated the laws of war, directly contributing to the high civilian death toll from Israeli counter-strikes.
2006 Qana airstrike	July 30, 2006	Qana	28	Shia Muslims	(Israel) Israeli Air Force	During the 2006 Lebanon War, a precision-guided munition struck a residential building where displaced families were sheltering. The IDF justified the strike by asserting that Hezbollah had used the building’s vicinity to launch Katyusha rockets, making it a legitimate tactical target under the doctrine of "human shielding." Forensically, the incident is significant for the collapse of a civilian shelter under precise munitions, leading to a major international investigation into the legalities of proportionality and "collateral damage" in urban warfare.
Marjayoun Convoy Incident	August 11, 2006	Kefraya	7	Red Cross	Israel Air Force	The IDF bombed a 359 vehicles convoy which was granted right of safe passage from the IDF, mediated through the UNIFIL. A reporter confirmed that the Red cross and Civil defense coming to aid the convoy were also bombed, which resulted in the death of a Red Cross volunteer
Pierre Gemayel Assassination	November 21, 2006	Beirut	2	Christians. Pierre Gemayel (Minister of Industry) and his bodyguard, Samir Chartouni.	Hezbollah	In a departure from car bombings, Gemayel’s convoy was rammed by another vehicle in broad daylight. Three gunmen emerged and opened fire with silenced automatic weapons at close range. The brazen nature of the attack in a crowded suburb caused massive political unrest. Location: Jdeideh, Northern Beirut Suburbs. Perpetrators: Hezbollah (Unit 121).
Walid Eido Massacre	June 13, 2007	Manara, Beirut	10	Walid Eido, his son, bodyguards, and 6 Sunni civilians	Hezbollah (Unit 121)	A car bomb targeting anti-Syrian MP Walid Eido exploded near the Military Beach Club in West Beirut. The blast was so powerful it killed Eido, his eldest son, two bodyguards, and six civilian bystanders. This event is cited as a "message" to the March 14 majority in parliament, intended to erode their numbers before key presidential elections.
Antoine Ghanem Massacre	September 19, 2007	Sin el Fil, Beirut	7	Antoine Ghanem and 6 Christian civilians	Hezbollah (Unit 121)	A massive 30 kg TNT bomb targeted the vehicle of Kataeb MP Antoine Ghanem. The explosion occurred in a crowded commercial street in Sin el Fil, killing Ghanem and six other people, including two of his bodyguards and several local shoppers. This massacre is historically linked to the "War of the Majorities" within the Lebanese parliament.
Francois al-Hajj Bombing	December 12, 2007	Baabda	5	Christians + Major-General Francois al-Hajj and his bodyguard.	Hezbollah	A car bomb targeted al-Hajj, who was the head of operations for the Lebanese Army and a candidate for Army Commander. The blast occurred near the Presidential Palace, killing three civilians in addition to the military targets. Location: Baabda, Mount Lebanon. Perpetrators: Hezbollah (Unit 121).
Wissam Eid Massacre	January 25, 2008	Hazmieh, Beirut	5	Wissam Eid, Sunni ISF Sergeant (bodyguard) and Christian bystanders	Hezbollah (Unit 121)	A massive car bomb targeted Captain Wissam Eid, the lead technical investigator for the ISF, as he drove through the Christian suburb of Hazmieh. The explosion killed Eid (a Shia officer working for the state), his bodyguard, and two Christian civilians. This massacre is cited by the STL as the "assassination of the investigation" itself, as Eid had discovered the network of mobile phones used by the Hezbollah hit squad.
May 2008 Conflict	May 7–14, 2008	Beirut, Alley, Chouf, Beqaa Valley, Akkar	81-110	Druze PSP, Lebanese Sunni Muslims Future Movement	Hezbollah, Amal, SSNP	The conflict was sparked by two cabinet decrees on May 5, 2008, which declared Hezbollah's private fiber-optic network illegal and dismissed the airport’s security chief over alleged ties to the group. Hezbollah characterized the moves as a "declaration of war" against its resistance infrastructure. In response, opposition forces seized West Beirut, forcing the government to rescind the orders via the Arab League-mediated Doha Agreement.
Mazraa Summary Executions	May 8, 2008	Corniche al-Mazraa, Beirut	~5	Sunni civilians	Hezbollah and Amal Movement	During the initial push into West Beirut, opposition gunmen opened fire on unarmed residents and fleeing Future Movement supporters in the Mazraa district. At least five civilians were executed in street corners or building lobbies after being identified as pro-government loyalists. Human Rights Watch documented these as non-combatant killings during the city’s takeover.
Ras al-Nabaa Executions	May 9, 2008	Ras el Nabaa, Beirut	3	Sunni (Local activists/ civilians)	Hezbollah	During the takeover of West Beirut, Hezbollah militants entered an apartment building in Ras al-Nabaa. Three individuals identified as supporters of the Future Movement were reportedly taken to a balcony and executed in front of neighbors. This was documented as a "cleansing" operation meant to secure the strategic corridor connecting West Beirut to the Southern Suburbs.
Tariq al-Jdideh Apartments Massacre	May 9, 2008	Tariq el Jdideh, Beirut	4	Sunni (Civilians/ guards)	Hezbollah	As militants moved to shut down the Future TV and Mustaqbal offices, a small security detail and two bystanders were cornered in a building stairwell. Forensic evidence indicates they were shot at close range despite being disarmed. This event effectively ended the armed resistance of the Sunni community in the capital during the May crisis.
Barbir District Summary Executions	May 10, 2008	Barbir, Beirut	5	Sunni civilians	Hezbollah	In the Barbir area, which witnessed some of the heaviest street fighting, five civilians were found shot at close range after Hezbollah units consolidated control over the intersection. Forensic grouping of shots suggested execution rather than stray fire from clashes. The victims were largely residents who had attempted to defend their neighborhoods during the initial militia surge.
Halba SSNP Office Massacre	May 11, 2008	Halba, Akkar District	11–14	SSNP (Greek Orthodox and Sunni members)	Anti-Hezbollah Future Movement partisans (Retaliation)	In a significant counter-massacre, local Sunni partisans in Halba attacked the offices of the pro-Hezbollah Syrian Social Nationalist Party (SSNP). At least 11 members were lynched and shot after surrendering. This event was the direct result of Hezbollah group’s offensive in Beirut.
Aley Checkpoint Executions 2008	May 11, 2008	Aley District, Mount Lebanon Governorate	4	Druze & Hezbollah	Hezbollah	During fierce fighting in the Aley mountains, both sides engaged in captive executions. Hezbollah militants abducted and executed one Druze captive at a checkpoint between Qmatiye and Souk el-Gharb. In immediate retaliation, PSP members kidnapped and executed three Hezbollah supporters in Aley. These summary executions are noted for their role in bringing the 2008 conflict to a total sectarian breakdown in the mountains.
Aley & Choueifat Captive Executions	May 11, 2008	Aley and Choueifat, Mount Lebanon Governorate	6	Shia and Druze (Captives)	Hezbollah / PSP (Tit-for-tat)	During the collapse of the mountain front, both Hezbollah and PSP militants engaged in summary executions of prisoners. Forensic evidence from human rights observers documented 4 Hezbollah members executed after being captured at a PSP checkpoint in Aley, and 2 PSP partisans executed by Hezbollah units near the Choueifat technical college. These incidents are forensically significant as they represent the breakdown of military discipline and the shift toward sectarian "blood-feud" liquidations during the 2008 crisis.
Assassination of Capt. Samer Hanna	August 28, 2008	Sajd, South Governorate	1	(Lebanon) Lebanese Maronite Christian (Lebanese Army Pilot)	Hezbollah	In a rare direct confrontation with the state, an Army helicopter was fired upon by militants while flying over the South. Captain Samer Hanna was killed. While the group eventually handed over a "lone wolf" (Mustafa Muqaddam) as the perpetrator, forensic reports on the flight path showed the helicopter was targeted in a deliberate effort to enforce a "no-fly zone" for the Lebanese Army over militia-controlled territory. This hit established that even state military aircraft were subject to the group's "security veto."
Assassination of Joseph Sader	February 12, 2009	Airport Road, Beirut	1	(Lebanon) Lebanese Maronite Christian (IT Director for Middle East Airlines)	Hezbollah Security Wing	Joseph Sader was abducted by two men in plain clothes while walking to his office at the airport. He was forced into a white SUV in an area under the group's total security control. Despite international pressure, he remains "disappeared." Forensic intelligence suggests he was targeted because his position gave him access to the airport's telecommunications and surveillance servers, which the group sought to bypass for their own logistics. This case remains a primary example of "non-lethal" liquidation of state technocrats.
Wissam al-Hassan Bombing (Ashrafieh)	October 19, 2012	Achrafieh Beirut	8	Wissam al-Hassan (ISF Intelligence Chief), his driver, and several civilians.	Hezbollah	One of the most devastating Unit 121 attacks. A massive car bomb was detonated in a densely populated residential and shopping district. Because of the location and time of day, the vast majority of the 110 casualties were non-combatant residents and shoppers. Casualties: 8 deaths; 110 wounded Location: Sassine Square, Ashrafieh, Beirut. Perpetrators: Hezbollah (Unit 121).
Arsal Intelligence Ambush	February 1, 2013	Arsal, Beqaa Governorate	2	(Lebanon) Lebanese Armed Forces (LAF) Intelligence Officers	Hezbollah (suspected orchestration)	Major Pierre Bachaalany and Sergeant Ibrahim Zahraman were killed when their unmarked intelligence unit was ambushed in the outskirts of Arsal. While initial reports blamed local "extremists," subsequent investigations by independent journalists suggested that Hezbollah intelligence provided the "tip" that led the unit into a trap. The incident was a strategic move to force the Lebanese Army into a direct confrontation with the Sunni border population that was supporting the Syrian opposition.
2013 Roueiss Bombing	August 15, 2013	Dahieh, Beirut	27	Lebanese Civilians	Aisha Umm al-Mu'minin Brigade (Claimed)	A powerful car bomb detonated in a densely populated commercial street in the Roueiss neighborhood of southern Beirut, killing 27 civilians and injuring over 300. Syrian rebel-aligned militant groups claimed responsibility for the attack.
Tripoli Mosque Bombings	August 23, 2013	Tripoli (Al-Taqwa and Al-Salam Mosques)	47–51	Sunni worshippers and civilians	Syrian Intelligence & Hezbollah aligned cells	Two massive car bombs exploded minutes apart outside the Al-Taqwa and Al-Salam mosques during Friday prayers. The judicial investigation led by Judge Arkani Abu Samra identified a cell led by pro-Syrian cleric Sheikh Hashem Minara and Ahmad al-Ghareeb. Forensic evidence and intercepted communications revealed that the cars were prepared in Syria and transported through Hezbollah-controlled border crossings. The attack targeted Sheikh Salem al-Rafei and other vocal critics of Hezbollah’s intervention in Syria. It remains the deadliest single bombing incident in Lebanon since the end of the Civil War.
Iranian Embassy Bombings in Beirut	November 19, 2013	Bir Hassan, Beirut	23	Diplomatic Staff & Civilians	Abdullah Azzam Brigades	Two suicide bombings targeted the Iranian Embassy compound in the Bir Hassan neighborhood of Beirut, killing 23 people, including an Iranian cultural attaché, and injuring over 160 others. The Al-Qaeda-affiliated Abdullah Azzam Brigades claimed responsibility for the attack.
Hassan al-Laqqis Assassination	December 4, 2013	Hadath, Beirut	1	Hezbollah military procurement apparatus	Free Sunnis of Baalbek Brigade (Syria) Islamic Nation Supporters Brigade (Ansar al-Umma)	A highly coordinated execution team infiltrated a residential parking structure in the southwest Beirut suburb of Hadath, successfully eliminating Hassan Hawlo al-Laqqis, Hezbollah's chief military logistics and advanced technology officer. The operators fired four silenced rounds into his vehicle at close range as he arrived at his residence, escaping undetected. The Al-Qaeda-linked Ahrar al-Sunna Baalbek Brigade and the Ansar al-Umma battalion issued public claims of responsibility for the operation, framing the strategic strike as direct retaliation for al-Laqqis' role in commanding joint campaigns alongside Syrian government forces in the ongoing Syrian conflict.
Assassination of Mohamad Chatah	December 27, 2013	Beirut Central District, Beirut	8	Sunni officials and 7 civilians	Hezbollah (Unit 121)	A car bomb targeted the convoy of Mohamad Chatah, a former Finance Minister and top advisor to Saad Hariri. The blast, occurring in a high-traffic commercial area, killed Chatah and seven others, including his bodyguard and several young civilians (notably student Mohammad al-Chaar). As a Sunni moderate and intellectual, Chatah’s execution was the final "March 14" liquidation before the political landscape shifted toward the current era.
Assassination of Abdulrahman Diab	February 20, 2014	Tripoli	1	Arab Democratic Party (ADP) military command	Unknown (Sunni Islamist militants suspected)	Masked gunmen on a motorcycle intercepted and opened fire on a vehicle traveling along the coastal Mina highway, successfully eliminating Abdulrahman Diab, a senior military official and executive member of the pro-Syrian Arab Democratic Party (ADP). Diab was heavily involved in commanding Alawite militia deployments in the Jabal Mohsen sector during the protracted Bab al-Tabbaneh–Jabal Mohsen conflict. The tactical strike targeted the armed command structure of an organization actively aligned with foreign Syrian interests, triggering localized security mobilizations across northern urban axes.
Arsal Border Liquidations	August 20, 2014	Arsal outskirts, Beqaa Governorate	Unverified (documented as targeted dis-appearances)	Local Sunni residents and Syrian refugees	Hezbollah Security Units	Following the 2014 Battle of Arsal, Hezbollah units conducted a series of "screening" operations in the surrounding hills. Moustafa al-Hujeiri (Abu Taqiyeh) and other local figures documented the abduction and subsequent summary execution of several individuals identified as logistical supporters of the Syrian opposition. These liquidations were carried out in "no-man's land" zones beyond the reach of the Lebanese Army, serving to dismantle the local support network for anti-Assad forces in the border region.
Qaa Suicide Bombings	June 27, 2016	Al-Qaa, Baalbek-Hermel Governorate	5	Maronite Christian civilians	Islamic State (Alleged/ Forensic identification)	A dual-wave tactical assault involving eight suicide bombers in a 24-hour period. At dawn, four bombers detonated in residential areas after being confronted by locals; in the evening, four more detonated near the St. Elias Church during a funeral wake for the morning's victims. While ISIS never officially claimed the attack, Lebanese intelligence and forensic signatures (suicide vest construction and Raqqa-origin cell members) confirmed their involvement. From an Israeli and regional security perspective, the operation was a failed attempt to ignite sectarian conflict between Christians and the Syrian refugee population. The disproportionate number of bombers (8) to victims (5) suggests the cell was intercepted while transiting to higher-value targets in the Bekaa or Beirut. The event solidified the security alliance in the borderlands, as local Christian militias and the Lebanese Army coordinated to seal the northeastern frontier.
Assassination of Colonel Joseph Skaf	March 5, 2017	Amchit, Mount Lebanon Governorate	1	(Lebanon) Lebanese Maronite Christian (Retired Customs Colonel)	Hezbollah (Suspected)	Colonel Joseph Skaf, who had written an official warning in 2014 about the "extreme danger" of the ammonium nitrate at Beirut Port, was found dead near his home. While initially ruled an accident (a fall), a second forensic autopsy requested by his family revealed he had been assaulted, citing "internal hemorrhaging" and blunt force trauma to the head. His death is forensically viewed as the first "preemptive" liquidation to bury the paper trail of the port's hazardous cargo.
Assassination of Mohammad Ali Younes	April 4, 2020	Nabatieh	1	Hezbollah counter-espionage apparatus	Unknown	A highly targeted ambush intercepted the vehicle of Mohammad Ali Younes, a senior commander within Hezbollah’s counter-espionage unit, on a road between the villages of Qaaqaaiyet al-Snoubar and Harouf. Younes, who was actively spearheading operations against hostile intelligence networks operating within Lebanon, was successfully eliminated via a combination of gunfire and close-quarter tactical strikes. Lebanese internal security forces deployed to the sector and detained an operative suspected of providing ground support for the foreign deep-penetration strike.
Assassination of Antoine Dagher	June 4, 2020	Hazmiyeh, Mount Lebanon Governorate	1	(Lebanon) Lebanese Maronite Christian (Head of Ethics & Risk at Byblos Bank)	Hezbollah (Suspected)	Antoine Dagher was stabbed to death in the parking lot of his residence. As the head of risk management, he was a key figure in the bank's compliance with international anti-money laundering (AML) and "Know Your Customer" (KYC) regulations targeting sanctioned entities. Forensic police reports noted a "professional" execution with multiple precise wounds to the neck and chest. His murder sent a chilling message to the banking sector regarding cooperation with international financial investigators tracing the group's liquidity channels.
Beirut Port Explosion	August 4, 2020	Beirut	218+	Lebanese civilians, mostly Christians	Hezbollah (alleged - see notes)	One of the largest non-nuclear explosions in history. It destroyed the grain silos and leveled much of the Gemmayzeh and Mar Mikhael neighborhoods. Investigation Interference and Obstruction: Since 2020, the judicial investigation into the Beirut Port explosion has been repeatedly stalled by political interference. Human Rights Watch and Amnesty International have documented a "culture of impunity," noting that Hezbollah and its allies have used legal maneuvers and direct threats to obstruct the work of Judge Tarek Bitar. In late 2021, Hezbollah security chief Wafiq Safa reportedly threatened to "uproot" Bitar. Following the 2021 Tayyouneh clashes, Hezbollah leader Hassan Nasrallah accused the investigation of being "politicized" and a "tool of foreign influence." As of 2024, the probe remains largely paralyzed due to non-cooperation from state security agencies and the refusal of the Ministry of Interior to execute warrants.
Assassination of Colonel Mounir Abou Rjeily	December 2, 2020	Qartaba, Byblos District	1	(Lebanon) Lebanese Maronite Christian (Retired Customs Colonel)	Hezbollah (Suspected)	Four months after the Port Blast, Colonel Abou Rjeily, a former high-ranking official in the Lebanese Customs with intimate knowledge of port oversight, was found murdered in his home. Investigative journalists noted that Abu Rjeily was a potential key witness regarding the nitrate shipments. Forensic reports indicated he was beaten to death with a sharp/blunt object. As a former head of the anti-smuggling unit at the port and a close colleague of Joseph Skaf, his death is classified by independent investigators as part of the "clean-up" operation to eliminate witnesses capable of testifying on the port’s security square (Zone 12).
Assassination of Joe Bejjani	December 21, 2020	Kahaleh	1	(Lebanon) Lebanese Maronite Christian (Investigative photographer)	Hezbollah (Unit 121)	Joe Bejjani, an investigative photographer who had documented the Beirut Port explosion site for international agencies, was assassinated in his car in front of his home. CCTV footage showed two professional gunmen using silenced weapons in a high-precision operation. While the case remained "open" for years, December 2025 intelligence disclosures formally identified Unit 121 as the perpetrator, citing Bejjani's possession of sensitive imagery related to the storage of ammonium nitrate as the motive for the liquidation. Sovereignty advocates cite the lack of state prosecution in this case as evidence of the group's "judicial veto."
Assassination of Lokman Slim	February 4, 2021	Addoussiyeh, South Governorate	1	Shia political activist and critic of Hezbollah	Hezbollah (Attributed by family and human rights groups)	Lokman Slim, a prominent Shia activist, publisher, and co-founder of UMAM Documentation & Research, was found shot to death in his car in Southern Lebanon. Slim was a vocal critic of Hezbollah and Syria's influence in Lebanon. His murder was widely condemned internationally as a targeted political assassination aimed at silencing independent Shia opposition voices.
Khalde Funeral Massacre	August 1, 2021	Khalde, Mount Lebanon Governorate	5	Sunni Arab Tribal members	Hezbollah militants	Following the killing of Hezbollah member Ali Shibli by a Arab tribal family in a blood feud, gunmen ambushed Shibli's funeral procession as it passed through Khalde. The resulting armed clashes between local tribal gunmen and Hezbollah supporters left five people dead and multiple others injured before the Lebanese Army deployed to restore order.
Ain al-Hilweh Combat Ambush	July 30, 2023	Ain al-Hilweh Camp, Sidon	6	(Palestine) Fatah military personnel and camp security	Al-Shabab Al-Muslim (Islamist militants)	An armed ambush targeted and killed senior Fatah military general Abu Ashraf al-Armoushi and three of his security details in a parking lot within the Ain al-Hilweh camp. The tactical strike, initiated by hardline Islamist militants from the Al-Shabab Al-Muslim group, followed a failed assassination attempt against another Fatah operative the previous day. The targeted engagement triggered days of intense urban combat across the sector as nationalist Fatah security forces moved to neutralize the militant strongholds violating the camp's administrative security protocols.
Assassination of Elias Hasrouni	August 2, 2023	Ain Ebel, South Governorate	1	(Lebanon) Maronite (Local Lebanese Forces coordinator)	Hezbollah (Unit 121)	Elias Hasrouni was found dead in an apparent car accident in a high-security zone. Subsequent CCTV leaks revealed a professional abduction by two SUVs. In November 2025, intelligence disclosures formally identified Hezbollah’s Unit 121 (the same squad linked to the Rafic Hariri and Lokman Slim assassinations) as the perpetrators. Reports detailed that Hasrouni was kidnapped, poisoned, and sustained broken ribs before his body was placed back in the vehicle to stage a "crash." This incident is cited by the Lebanese Forces as a primary example of "state impunity" in militia-controlled territories.
2023 Ainata airstrike	November 5, 2023	Ainata	4	(Civilians from Hezbollah aligned family)	Israel Air Force	An Israeli drone strike targeted a vehicle carrying the family of Samir Ayoub, a journalist associated with the "Resistance" media environment. The strike killed Ayoub’s sister and three granddaughters. While the IDF initially claimed to have targeted "terrorists" in a suspicious vehicle, forensic reviews found no combatants present. The incident is cited by analysts as a pivotal moment where the group utilized the tragedy to formalize its "Civilian for Civilian" deterrence equation, launching a massive rocket barrage on Kiryat Shmona and effectively asserting unilateral control over Lebanon's "Red Lines" independent of the Lebanese Armed Forces.
Assassination of Pascal Suleiman	April 7, 2024	Jbeil	1	(Lebanon) Lebanese Maronite Christian (Lebanese Forces Official)	Syrian Regime / Hezbollah (Suspected)	Pascal Suleiman, the Jbeil coordinator for the Lebanese Forces, was abducted while driving near his home. His body was later found in Syria. While official reports initially cited a "car theft" gone wrong, forensic medical reports and the Lebanese Forces leadership identified it as a political liquidation. The sophistication of the abduction—involving a coordinated multi-vehicle block—matched the "Unit 121" tactical signature used in the 2023 Hasrouni case.
August 2024 Nabatieh attack	August 17, 2024	Nabatieh	11+	Syrian refugees	Israel Air Force	IDF precision strikes targeted a warehouse in the Wadi al-Kfour industrial zone. While local reports focused on the deaths of 11 Syrian refugees residing in the facility, the IDF confirmed the site served as a strategic weapons storage depot for the group. This incident highlights the group's practice of embedding military logistics within industrial zones populated by displaced laborers.
2024 Lebanon electronic device attacks	September 17–18, 2024	Cities across Lebanon	42	Hezbollah	Israel Mossad	In a large-scale clandestine sabotage operation, thousands of pagers and handheld transceivers utilized by Hezbollah were simultaneously detonated via remote signal. The operation targeted the group’s internal "low-tech" communication network, which had been adopted to evade electronic surveillance. Forensically, the event is defined by a supply-chain interdiction where explosive components were integrated into hardware prior to distribution. Strategically, the strike functioned as a logistical decapitation, degrading Hezbollah’s command-and-control capabilities and disrupting their mobilization infrastructure during a period of escalating border tensions.
September 2024 Israeli attacks against Lebanon	September 23–30, 2024	Cities across Lebanon	700+	Hezbollah Hamas; Amal; PFLP	Israel	"Operation Northern Arrows." A massive aerial campaign focused on the systematic dismantling of the group's long-range missile capabilities and command structure. High-ranking casualties included Ibrahim Qubaisi and other senior Hezbollah commanders. The scale of civilian displacement was largely attributed to the group's deep-rooted "human shield" doctrine, where launchers and ammunition were embedded within thousands of private homes in the South and Beqaa.
2024 Debel Incident	October 2, 2024	Debel, Bint Jbeil District	3	Lebanese Christian civilians	Hezbollah (attributed)	On October 2, 2024, a missile strike hit the residence of the Said family in the Christian border village of Debel. The strike resulted in the deaths of three family members: Major Fadi Said (a retired Lebanese Army officer), his father, and his mother. Local residents and family members reported that the missile was fired by Hezbollah forces operating in the vicinity, targeting what was perceived as Israeli movement in the area. This event caused significant tension within the village regarding the presence of military infrastructure near civilian-populated Christian enclaves during the 2024 conflict.
2024 Beirut medical center airstrike	October 4, 2024	Beirut	9+	Hezbollah Shia Muslims	Israel Air Force	A targeted strike on a facility in central Beirut used by the Islamic Health Committee. The IDF identified the location as a "dual-use" coordination hub for the group's military operations. The strike aimed to neutralize tactical logistical networks that utilized medical and civil defense cover to bypass surveillance in the capital.
2024 Derdghaya Melkite Church airstrike	October 9, 2024	Derdghaya	8+	Hezbollah operatives (Islamic Health Authority)	Israel Air Force	A targeted strike leveled the St. George Melkite Catholic Church and its parish complex. While initial reports cited displaced civilians, the IDF confirmed the target was a command-and-control center operated by the group's Islamic Health Authority (IHA) located in the church annex. Five of the confirmed deaths were IHA rescue workers. This event is cited as a prime example of the group's "human shielding" strategy, specifically utilizing historic Christian religious sites and civilian medical identities to mask military coordination and storage hubs in the South.
October 2024 Bachoura airstrike	October 10, 2024	Beirut	22+	Hezbollah Shia Muslims (Assassination target: Wafiq Safa)	Israel Air Force	A high-value target strike utilizing US-made JDAMs in central Beirut. The objective was Wafiq Safa, the group's security chief and key liaison to state institutions. Safa survived, but the strike highlighted the risk posed by high-ranking militia figures residing in densely populated residential blocks, leading to 22 civilian deaths as a direct result of their proximity to high-value military targets.
October 2024 Aitou airstrike	October 14, 2024	Aitou, Zgharta District	23	Hezbollah Operatives (Targeted) and displaced individuals	Israel Air Force	A precision strike on a three-story residential building in the predominantly Christian village of Aitou. The IDF identified the target as Ahmad Fakih, a senior commander within the group's southern front. Intelligence reports and local testimonies indicated the strike was triggered by the arrival of a group representative at the building. While the deaths of 23 people were reported, the IDF maintained the facility was being utilized as a clandestine safe house and financial distribution node. The incident illustrates the group’s expansion into northern Christian enclaves to exploit their perceived "safe zone" status for military logistics and cash disbursements to operatives.
Attack on Nabatieh municipal council	October 16, 2024	Nabatieh	16+	(Hezbollah) Lebanese Shia Muslims (Municipal officials; "Loyalty to the Resistance" bloc)	Israel Air Force	Israeli airstrikes targeted the Nabatieh municipal headquarters during a meeting of the "crisis cell" composed of officials from the Hezbollah-Amal "Development and Loyalty" alliance. The strike killed 16 people, including Mayor Ahmad Kahil. While humanitarian reports focused on aid coordination, security analysts and the IDF cited the building's role as a command-and-control hub for the Radwan Force. Sovereignty advocates cite the incident as a primary example of "militia embedding," where the group’s military apparatus utilizes state municipal infrastructure, merging civilian administration with militia logistics.
2024 Beqaa Valley airstrikes	October 28, 2024	Beqaa Valley	60+	Hezbollah Logistics & Weapons personnel	Israel Air Force	Part of the expanded "Northern Arrows" campaign to neutralize the group's deep-tier strategic reserves. The strikes targeted over a dozen villages in the Baalbek-Hermel region. The IDF provided forensic video evidence of secondary explosions within residential structures, confirming the storage of medium-range missiles and drone components inside family homes. This mass-casualty event is forensically categorized as a "de-stocking" operation aimed at neutralizing the group's offensive capability before it could be deployed against the Galilee.
Barja Attack	November 7, 2024	Barja	30+	Hezbollah operatives (embedded)	Israel Air Force	A targeted strike on a residential building housing displaced families in a town north of Sidon. Although no prior warning was issued, the IDF intelligence identified the building as a sanctuary for military personnel who had evacuated from the southern border. The high civilian toll is attributed to the group's practice of utilizing "host populations" in predominantly Sunni or neutral towns to mask the movement of their combatants during the 2024 ground invasion.
2024 Akkar airstrike	November 11, 2024	Ain Yaaqoub, Akkar Governorate	14	Hezbollah logistics personnel and Syrian residents	Israel Air Force	A precision strike on a three-story residential building in northern Lebanon. The IDF identified the structure as a clandestine logistical node utilized by the group for personnel transport and sheltering "high-value" operatives away from the southern front. While 14 deaths were confirmed—including a Syrian family residing in the area—the IDF maintained the target was a specific military liaison. The strike illustrated the group's strategy of utilizing remote, historically neutral northern villages to embed its operational chain of command within civilian-leased properties.
Basta Airstrikes	November 23, 2024	Beirut	29+	Hezbollah Senior Leadership (Targeted)	Israel Air Force	A massive "bunker-buster" operation targeting an eight-story residential building in the Basta neighborhood. The IDF identified the site as a clandestine meeting point for senior militia leadership. While initial casualty reports focused on residents, security sources noted the target was a senior official whose presence in the densely populated district converted the civilian block into a "de facto" military headquarters. This strike followed the November 17 liquidation of media chief Mohammad Afif, illustrating the systematic dismantling of the group's urban command network.
2025 Bint Jbeil drone strike	September 21, 2025	Bint Jbeil, Nabatieh Governorate	5	Hezbollah, Shia Muslims	Israel Air Force	An Israeli drone fired two guided missiles targeting a motorcycle and a passing civilian vehicle. The strike killed Mohammad Majed Mroueh, identified by Lebanese army intelligence and the IDF as a Hezbollah operative. The second missile struck a car carrying the Charara family, killing Shadi Charara (a car dealer) and three of his children (Celine, and 18-month-old twins Hadi and Silan). While Lebanese officials, including Speaker Nabih Berri, initially claimed the victims were U.S. citizens, the U.S. State Department disputed this, clarifying they were not citizens but had immediate family ties to Dearborn, Michigan. The IDF acknowledged the civilian deaths and initiated an investigation, while citing the proximity of the motorcycle operative to the civilian vehicle as the primary cause of the collateral casualties.
Tebnine Telecom Technician Incidents	September 22, 2025	Tebnine, Nabatieh Governorate	3	(Lebanon) Lebanese Maronite Christians & Shia (Telecomm Technicians)	Hezbollah (Suspected)	Three technicians working on a mobile tower relay were abducted following an Israeli strike that hit a nearby weapons depot. Local reports indicated they were killed via small arms fire at close range. The group’s security wing allegedly accused the team of "signal spoofing" or providing metadata that allowed for the tracking of mobile devices used by the group's leadership. This event is cited as part of the 2025 "Digital Purge" of the South's technocratic class.
Sidon Airstrike (Ain al-Hilweh)	November 18, 2025	Ain al-Hilweh camp, Sidon District	13+	Hamas operatives (including trainers)	Israel Air Force	A precision airstrike targeted a clandestine training compound situated between a mosque and a sports field in the Ain al-Hilweh refugee camp. The IDF identified the site as a tactical facility used by Hamas to plan attacks against Israeli interests from Lebanese soil. Forensic confirmation on November 21 identified Jawad Sidawi, a senior training official, among the dead. While local health officials noted civilian proximity and the deaths of children, the IDF provided aerial surveillance footage demonstrating the site's primary use as a "military compound," highlighting the group's practice of embedding militant training infrastructure within the densely populated Palestinian enclave.
November 2025 Israeli attack in Beirut	November 23, 2025	Beirut (Haret Hreik)	5	Hezbollah Senior Command (including Haytham Ali Tabatabai)	Israel Air Force	A high-value interdiction strike targeting an apartment block in the Dahiyeh stronghold. The operation successfully eliminated Haytham Ali Tabatabai (Abu Ali Tabatabai), the Chief of Staff of the group's armed wing and a deputy to Secretary-General Naim Qassem. Tabatabai was a key figure in the group's buildup and armament strategy. Despite the 2024 ceasefire, the IDF executed the strike based on intelligence that Tabatabai was actively coordinating the replenishment of strategic missile stockpiles. The elimination of such a senior military architect within a residential block reinforces the group's continued reliance on urban density to shield its command-and-control leadership from surveillance.
Unit 121 Port Witness Assassinations	December 2, 2025	Beirut	4 documented	(Lebanon) Lebanese (Customs officers, activists, and photographers)	Hezbollah Unit 121 (Assassination Squad)	In December 2025, fresh disclosures identified Unit 121 as the cell responsible for a multi-year campaign to silence key figures with knowledge of Hezbollah's role in the storage of ammonium nitrate at Hangar 12. Victims included high-ranking customs officials and an investigative photographer who had documented the port's logistics. These findings were cited by sovereignty advocates as evidence of a "lethal veto" over the Lebanese judicial process regarding the 2020 blast investigation.
OSINT Activist Disappearances	January 7–9, 2026	Beirut and Tripoli	3	(Lebanon) Sunni and Shia (Independent Researchers)	Hezbollah Security Wing (Attributed)	Human rights monitors reported a series of enforced disappearances involving independent researchers and digital activists tracking military infrastructure. The UN Working Group on Enforced or Involuntary Disappearances (Jan 2026) documented a pattern of abductions characterized by the prior compromising of the targets' digital metadata. These incidents occurred amid a broader effort to restrict independent reporting on logistics and non-civilian sites.
Tele-communications Security Incident	January 18, 2026	Dahieh, Beirut	1 (Reported)	(Lebanon) Shia (Technical Consultant)	Hezbollah Security Apparatus (Attributed)	Reports emerged of a fatal security incident involving a technical consultant linked to the Ministry of Telecommunications in the Southern Suburbs. The incident occurred amid a broader government effort to regulate unauthorized fiber-optic networks and enforce a ban on non-state military communications infrastructure. Human rights monitors noted a pattern of intimidation against technocrats tasked with implementing the 2026 state security mandate, citing the risks faced by civil servants operating in de facto controlled zones.
Beddawi Security Incidents	January 26, 2026	Beddawi Camp, North Governorate	3 injured	Palestinians (Fatah affiliated supporters)	Hezbollah Security Wing / Local Proxies (Attributed)	Tensions escalated in Beddawi as the Lebanese Army announced plans to assume control of the camp's checkpoints. On January 26, three individuals, including supporters of the state's security mandate, were injured in a grenade and small-arms attack. Local monitors cited the incident as an effort by de facto security elements to deter coordination with the central government and maintain autonomous logistics zones.
Ain al-Hilweh Security Incident	February 20, 2026	Ain al-Hilweh, Saida District	2	Hamas (Operatives / Dissident aligned)	Hezbollah Security Wing (Attributed)	A targeted IAF strike destroyed a command hub in the Hittin neighborhood. Local security observers within the camp reported that the two individuals present had been targeted in an "internal security review" shortly before the kinetic strike occurred. This incident took place amid documented friction between camp leadership and non-state military advisors over the use of civilian zones for military logistics. Regional analysts cite the event as part of a broader "counter-intelligence" effort by de facto security authorities to neutralize potential informants following the 2025 mandate for state security oversight.
Ghazali Family Incident	March 5, 2026	Mashgharah, Beqaa Governorate	4	Hezbollah (Commander's family/affiliates)	Israel Air Force (IAF)	A targeted IAF strike eliminated Ibrahim Muhammad Ghazali, identified by the IDF as a specialized commander within Hezbollah's Badr Unit responsible for managing weapons operations. The strike, which hit a military-linked structure in Mashgharah, resulted in four fatalities. The incident gained international notoriety after a relative, Ayman Ghazali, launched a retaliatory terror attack against a synagogue in Michigan, USA, on March 12, citing the strike as his primary motive.
Nabatieh Municipal Security Incident	March 12, 2026	Nabatieh, South Governorate	4	(Lebanon) Lebanese (Municipal staff / LAF Liaisons)	Hezbollah aligned Security Elements (Attributed)	Following the expansion of the Lebanese Armed Forces (LAF) "Phase 2" deployment into the South, reports emerged of a fatal security incident involving four municipal officials in Nabatieh. The officials were reportedly involved in coordinating civilian infrastructure handovers with state authorities. Local human rights monitors noted that the incident occurred amid a broader campaign of intimidation targeting civil servants who facilitated the 2025 disarmament mandates, highlighting the ongoing friction between central government oversight and local de facto security structures.
Border Zone Security Incidents	March 15, 2026–April 10, 2026	Rmeish, Dhayra, and Wazzani, South Governorate	14 (Documented cases)	(Lebanon) Lebanese (Local farmers and residents)	Hezbollah Security Apparatus (Attributed)	Following the March 2026 ground operations in Southern Lebanon, reports emerged of a series of fatal security incidents involving 14 civilians in the 5 km border zone. Victims, including residents from Rmeish and Dhayra, were reportedly targeted after being accused of violating de facto military exclusion zones. Human rights monitors noted that these incidents appeared to enforce a civilian vacuum in sensitive frontline areas, restricting non-militia presence near Radwan unit operational zones. Forensic reports cited in international inquiries identified patterns of summary treatment related to suspected "signal facilitation."
Operation Eternal Darkness	April 8, 2026	Beirut, Beqaa Valley, and Tyre	357+	Hezbollah operatives (Radwan Force and Command Array) (250) and Shia civilians (107+)	Israel Defense Forces (IAF)	A large-scale, coordinated "decapitation strike" involving 50 fighter jets and 160 precision munitions. The IDF targeted over 100 military objectives within ten minutes, focusing on headquarters, intelligence centers, and missile infrastructure. In central Beirut (Al-Basta and Msaytbeh), the IAF utilized precision-guided munitions to neutralize safe apartments used by senior commanders. The IDF confirmed the liquidation of at least 250 militants, including mid-tier tactical leaders. The operation was strategically timed to preempt a potential regrouping following the Iran-Israel ceasefire, aiming to permanently degrade the group's naval, aerial, and Radwan Force capabilities while neutralizing "dual-use" urban military hubs embedded within civilian districts.
