= Mlikh =

Mlikh مليخ
- Municipality
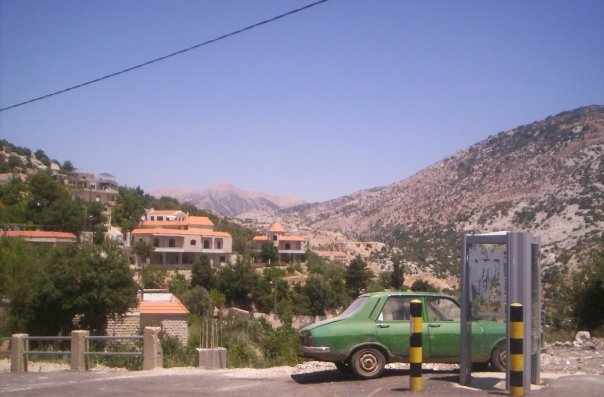

- Location within Lebanon
- Coordinates: 33°28′02″N 35°33′13″E
- Grid position: 133/170 L
- Country: Lebanon
- Governorate: South Governorate
- District: Jezzine District

Area
  - Total: 4.52 km^{2} (1.75 sq mi)
- Elevation: 930 m (3,050 ft)

Mlikh (Arabic: مليخ, romanized: Mlīkh) is a mountain municipality in the Jezzine district, located in the South Governorate in Southern Lebanon. It lies on the Al Rihan mountain chain (around 4,000-7,000 feet above sea level, Mlikh is located at around 1,280 meters and higher at other peaks above sea level). The village is located on a number of mountains peaks, and between the mountain peaks.

== Etymology ==
The word Mlikh may derive from the Semitic (Aramaic) word for "king". The root of Mlikh or king in the Semitic language is mlk. The word malik derives from the Semitic root mlk. Mlikh or mlk may also possibly be connected to Moloch since moloch derives from the same mlk root, and means "to rule". In Phoenician (where it is theorized "mlk" derives from) mlk has been linked to "king", possibly deriving from pagan Melqart.

== History ==
In 1838, Eli Smith noted Melikh as a village by Jezzin, "East of et-Tuffa".

Mlikh was under Israeli occupation from 1982 until 2000.

On the night of 12-13 September 1997 four Hizbullah members were killed in an Israeli ambush near Mlikh. Amongst the dead was 18-year-old Hadi Nasrallah, son of Hassan Nasrallah. Three months later, 12 December, another Hizbollah fighter was killed during an attack on a SLA compound near Mlikh.

== Demographics ==
In 2014, Muslims made up 50.88% and Christians made up 49.12% of registered voters in Mlikh. 50.84% of the voters were Shitte Muslims and 38.96% were Maronite Catholics.

The natives of Mlikh are Metawli and Maronite-Christians. The village houses one church, one mosque, and a Hussainiya.

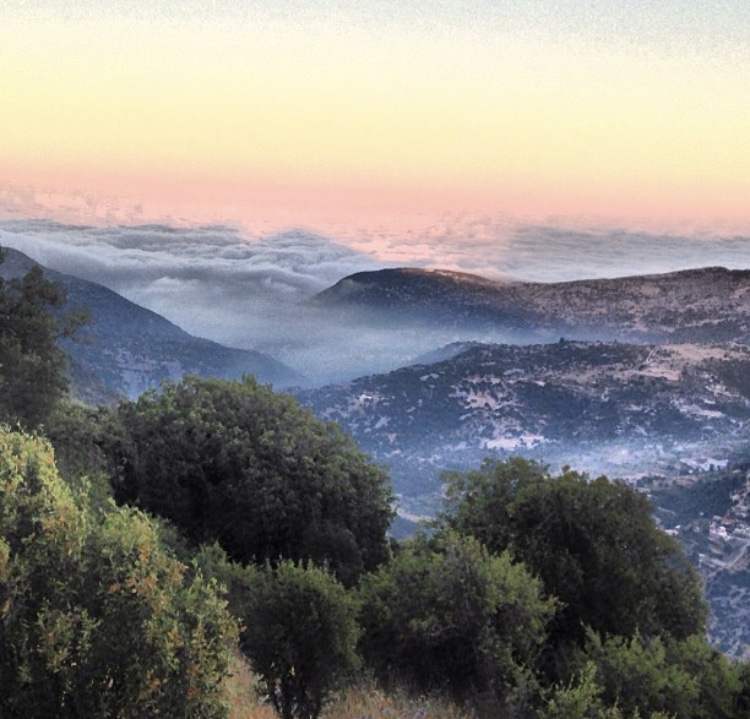
Burkab mountain peak, above the clouds, Mlikh, Al Rihan (mountain chain), Jezzine District, Nabatieh Governorate, South Lebanon, Lebanon, Middle East, Mediterranean, بركاب، مليخ، جنوب لبنان

== Historical significance ==
The village is home to a number of ancient "prophets" whose tombs are located on the mountain peaks surrounding Mlikh, including Burkab, and Sujud (believed by some scholars to be Oholiab, however his existence or this connection cannot be fully verified). Shia and Christian inhabitants of the village and of the southern Lebanese region make pilgrimages to the tombs.

== Notable people ==
Amal Abou Zeid (born 5 June 1953) is a member of the Lebanese parliament, and is from Mlikh. He is a member of the National Commission for Economy, Trade, Industry and Planning in the Lebanese Parliament, since December 2016.

== Bibliography ==
- Robinson, E.; Smith, E. (1841). Biblical Researches in Palestine, Mount Sinai and Arabia Petraea: A Journal of Travels in the year 1838. Vol. 3. Boston: Crocker & Brewster.
