= Al-Hassaniye =

Al-Hassaniye الحسانيه
- Municipality
- Location in Lebanon
- Coordinates: 33°31′10″N 35°27′10″E
- Country: Lebanon
- Governorate: South Governorate
- District: Jezzine District

Area
  - Total: 0.62 sq mi (1.6 km^{2})
- Elevation: 790 ft (240 m)
- Time zone: UTC+2 (EET)
  - Summer (DST): +3

Al-Hassaniye (Arabic: الحسانيه, romanized: al-Ḥassāniyeh) is a municipality in the Jezzine District of the South Governorate of Lebanon.

== Demographics ==
In 2014, Christians made up 98.70% of registered voters in Al-Hassaniye. 80.73% of the voters were Greek Catholics and 13.80% were Maronite Catholics.
