= Al-Maharbiyah =

Al-Maharbiyah المحاربية
- Municipality
- Location in Lebanon
- Coordinates: 33°31′34.18″N 35°26′53.68″E
- Country: Lebanon
- Governorate: South Governorate
- District: Jezzine District
- Time zone: UTC+2 (EET)
  - Summer (DST): +3

Al-Maharbiyah (Arabic: المحاربية) is a municipality in the Jezzine District of the South Governorate of Lebanon.

== Demographics ==
In 2014, Christians made up 98.63% of registered voters in Al-Maharbiyah. 80.82% of the voters were Greek Catholics and 12.33% were Maronite Catholics.
