= Sejoud =

Jabal Sujud سجد Sujud
- Municipality
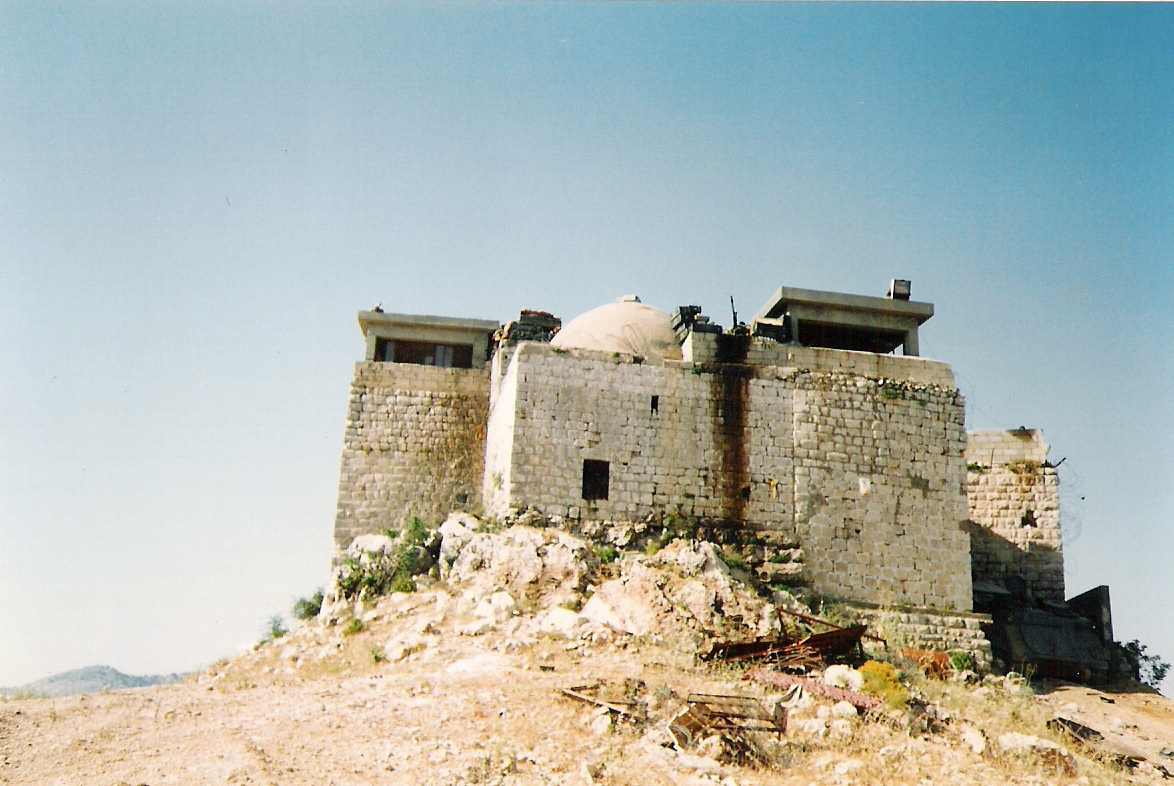
- Nabi Sujud shrine for Oholiab Ben Akhisamakh.

- Location in Lebanon
- Coordinates: 33°26′02″N 35°32′03″E
- Country: Lebanon
- Governorate: South Governorate
- District: Jezzine District
- Time zone: UTC+2 (EET)
  - Summer (DST): +3

Sujud (Levantine Arabic: سجد, romanized: Sejūd) is a municipality in the Jezzine District of the South Governorate of Lebanon.

== History ==
The municipality is the location of Nabi Sujud shrine for Oholiab. In the Hebrew Bible, Oholiab, son of Ahisamach, of the tribe of Dan, worked under Bezalel as the deputy architect of the Tabernacle and the implements which it housed, including the Ark of the Covenant. He is described in Exodus 38:23 as a master of carpentry, weaving, and embroidery.

Due to its tactical position, on a hilltop 1,200 metres above sea level with a panoramic view of the surrounding valleys, Sejoud was the site of almost continual fighting from the beginning of the Lebanese Civil War in 1975 until the end of the Israeli occupation in 2000. Like many towns in the region, Sejoud was damaged and littered with cluster submunitions during the 34 day war between Hezbollah and Israel in the summer of 2006. The 1,000 people who were in Sejoud before the 2006 conflict have mostly returned.

On 26 September 2026, The Israeli army said it struck a Hezbollah weapons cache in the municipality to “remove a threat” to Israeli troops. The site was used by Hezbollah to store various weapons for targeting IDF soldiers operating in the southern Lebanon security zone, the army says.

== Demographics ==
In 2014, Muslims made up 99.89% of registered voters in Sujud. 97.98% of the voters were Shiite Muslims. Lebanon’s 2014 voter rolls recorded 942 registered voters in Sejoud (440 men and 502 women).
