= Anan, Lebanon =

Anan انان
- Municipality
- Location in Lebanon
- Coordinates: 33°34′05″N 35°30′26″E
- Country: Lebanon
- Governorate: South Governorate
- District: Jezzine District
- Time zone: UTC+2 (EET)
  - Summer (DST): +3

Anan (Arabic: انان, romanized: Ānān) is a municipality in the Jezzine District of the South Governorate of Lebanon.

== Demographics ==
In 2014, Christians made up 98.68% of registered voters in Anan. 46.48% of the voters were Greek Catholics and 44.93% were Maronite Catholics.
