= Jensnaya =

Jensnaya جنسنايا
- Municipality
- Location in Lebanon
- Coordinates: 33°32′10″N 35°26′01″E
- Country: Lebanon
- Governorate: South Governorate
- District: Jezzine District
- Time zone: UTC+2 (EET)
  - Summer (DST): +3

Jensnaya (Arabic: جنسنايا) is a municipality in the Jezzine District of the South Governorate of Lebanon.

== Demographics ==
In 2014, Christians made up 98.61% of registered voters in Jensnaya. 73.89% of the voters were Greek Catholics and 13.33% were Maronite Catholics.
