= Kfar Hounah =

Town in the South Governate of Lebanon

Kfar Hounah كفرحونة Kfarhounah
- Municipality
- Location in Lebanon
- Coordinates: 33°29′35″N 35°35′10″E
- Country: Lebanon
- Governorate: South Governorate
- District: Jezzine District

Area
  - Total: 0.850 sq mi (2.201 km^{2})
- Elevation: 3,600 ft (1,100 m)
- Time zone: UTC+2 (EET)
  - Summer (DST): +3

Kfar Hounah, (Arabic: كفرحونة, romanized: Kfarḥūnah), also known as Kfarhounah or Kfar Houna, is a municipality in the Jezzine District of the South Governorate of Lebanon.

== Etymology ==
The name of this town comes from the Aramaic 'Kfar Ahoneh', which means "young brothers' village" according to local legend.

== Geography ==
Located 80 kilometres away from the capital Beirut in the predominantly Christian district of Jezzine, the population of Kfarhouna mainly consists of Melkite Greek Catholics and Shiite Muslims. The town's altitude ranges between 1100 and 1400 metres above sea level.

== History ==
The history of the village begins in the Phoenician period, which might explain the Aramaic name. In 1838, Eli Smith noted Kefr Huneh as a village by Jezzin, "East of et-Tuffa".

== Demographics ==
In 2014, Christians made up 50.32% and Muslims made up 48.81% of registered voters in Kfar Hounah. 47.35% of the voters were Shiite Muslims, 34.63% were Greek Catholics and 13.26% were Maronite Catholics.

== Bibliography ==
- Robinson, E.; Smith, E. (1841). Biblical Researches in Palestine, Mount Sinai and Arabia Petraea: A Journal of Travels in the year 1838. Vol. 3. Boston: Crocker & Brewster.
