= Karkha =

Karkha كرخا
- Municipality
- Location in Lebanon
- Coordinates: 33°33′52″N 35°26′45″E
- Country: Lebanon
- Governorate: South Governorate
- District: Jezzine District
- Time zone: UTC+2 (EET)
  - Summer (DST): +3

Karkha (Arabic: كرخا, romanized: Karkhā) is a municipality in the Jezzine District of the South Governorate of Lebanon.

== History ==
In 1838, Eli Smith noted it as a village called Kerkha es-Sufla located in "Aklim et-Tuffah, adjacent to Seida".

In 1875, Victor Guérin travelled in the area, and noted: "I arrive at Kerkha, a village surrounded by plantations of fig and mulberry trees, and situated on a high point. Its population amounts to 400 "Greeks united". 1 kilometre to the east-south-east of this village, a chapel dedicated to Mar Hanna, and rebuilt about thirty years ago, succeeded an ancient sanctuary; it is surrounded by a group of old trees."

== Demographics ==
In 2014, Christians made up 99.61% of registered voters in Karkha. 83.04% of the voters were Greek Catholics and 11.44% were Maronite Catholics.

== Bibliography ==
- Guérin, V. (1880). Description Géographique Historique et Archéologique de la Palestine (in French). Vol. 3: Galilee, pt. 2. Paris: L'Imprimerie Nationale.
- Robinson, E.; Smith, E. (1841). Biblical Researches in Palestine, Mount Sinai and Arabia Petraea: A Journal of Travels in the year 1838. Vol. 3. Boston: Crocker & Brewster.
