= Bisri, Lebanon =

Bisri بسري
- Municipality
- Location in Lebanon
- Coordinates: 33°34′42″N 35°32′24″E
- Country: Lebanon
- Governorate: South Governorate
- District: Jezzine District
- Time zone: UTC+2 (EET)
  - Summer (DST): +3

Bisri (Arabic: بسري, romanized: Bisrī) is a municipality in the Jezzine District of the South Governorate of Lebanon.

== Demographics ==
In 2014, Christians made up 97.60% of registered voters in Bisri. 76.05% of the voters were Maronite Catholics and 17.07% were Greek Catholics.
