= Wadi Baanqoudain =

Wadi Baanqoudain وادي بعنقودين
- Municipality
- Location in Lebanon
- Coordinates: 33°32′46.18″N 35°26′21.25″E
- Country: Lebanon
- Governorate: South Governorate
- District: Jezzine District
- Time zone: UTC+2 (EET)
  - Summer (DST): +3

Wadi Baanqoudain (Arabic: وادي بعنقودين) is a municipality in the Jezzine District of the South Governorate of Lebanon.

== Demographics ==
In 2014, Christians made up 99.78% of registered voters in Wadi Baanqoudain. 70.54% of the voters were Maronite Catholics and 23.23% were Greek Catholics.
