= Mazraat al-Mathanah =

Mazraat al-Mathanah مزرعة المطحنة
- Municipality
- Location in Lebanon
- Coordinates: 33°34′41.35″N 35°31′8.99″E
- Country: Lebanon
- Governorate: South Governorate
- District: Jezzine District
- Time zone: UTC+2 (EET)
  - Summer (DST): +3

Mazraat al-Mathanah (Arabic: مزرعة المطحنة, romanized: Mazraʿat al-Maṭḥanah) is a municipality in the Jezzine District of the South Governorate of Lebanon.

== Demographics ==
In 2014, Christians made up 97.81% of registered voters in Mazraat al-Mathanah. 75.00% of the voters were Maronite Catholics and 17.50% were Greek Catholics.
