= Kfar Falous =

Village in the Jezzine District of southern Lebanon

Kfar Falous كفرفالوس Kfarfalous
- Municipality
- Location in Lebanon
- Coordinates: 33°32′37″N 35°28′32″E
- Country: Lebanon
- Governorate: South Governorate
- District: Jezzine District

Area
  - Total: 2.72 sq mi (7.04 km^{2})
- Elevation: 1,350 ft (410 m)
- Time zone: UTC+2 (EET)
  - Summer (DST): +3

Kfar Falous, also spelled Kfarfalous (Arabic: كفرفالوس, romanized: Kfarfālūs) is a municipality in the Jezzine District of the South Governorate of Lebanon, about 57 km south of Beirut. Kfar Falous is known for being home to the unfinished now abandoned Kfar Falous University Complex.

== History ==
In 1838, Eli Smith noted Kefr Falus, as a village located in "Aklim et-Tuffah, adjacent to Seida".

Following the Israeli retreat after the 1982 invasion, Kfar Falous was the village closest to Sidon in their self-declared security zone.

In the early 1980s, Rafic Hariri's Future Movement initiated the Kfar Falous Cultural and Medical Complex project at the village. Partnering with institutions like the Jesuit Université Saint-Joseph and the American University of Beirut, the complex featured educational, medical, and recreational facilities, and aimed to promote national unity. The complex suffered damage during the 1982 Israeli invasion and was destroyed in 1985 by the Lebanese Forces and the Free Lebanese Army.

On 21 June 1990 members of the SLA clashed with fighters from NLA in Kfar Falous. The NLA were the dominant militia in Sidon. Four of their men were killed.

== Demographics ==
In 2014, Christians made up 99.57% of registered voters in Qaitouli. 62.45% of the voters were Greek Catholics and 30.90% were Maronite Catholics.

== Bibliography ==
- Robinson, E.; Smith, E. (1841). Biblical Researches in Palestine, Mount Sinai and Arabia Petraea: A Journal of Travels in the year 1838. Vol. 3. Boston: Crocker & Brewster.
