= Ar-Rihan =

Ar-Rihan الريحان
- Municipality
- Location in Lebanon
- Coordinates: 33°26′39″N 35°34′03″E
- Grid position: 134/167 L
- Country: Lebanon
- Governorate: South Governorate
- District: Jezzine District

Area
  - Total: 10 km^{2} (3.9 sq mi)
- Elevation: 1,100 m (3,600 ft)
- Time zone: UTC+2 (EET)
  - Summer (DST): UTC+3 (EEST)

Ar-Rihan (Arabic: الريحان, romanized: ar-Rīḥān) is a municipality located in the southern part of Lebanon, on Ar-Rihan mountain in Jezzine District. The village is surrounded by mountain peaks, pine and oak forests. Its altitude ranges from 740 to 1250 m and is 83 km from the capital Beirut.

== Etymology ==
The village is named after Mount Rihan, which takes its name from basil (Lebanese Arabic: ريحان, romanized: rīḥān), a plant that grows abundantly in the area.

== History ==
In the 1596 tax records, named as Wad Rihan, it was a village in the Ottoman nahiya (subdistrict) of Sagif under the liwa' (district) of Safad, with a population of 47 households, all Muslim. The villagers taxes on agricultural products, such as goats and beehives, in addition to "occasional revenues" and a fixed sum; a total of 4,250 akçe.

== Geography ==
Its closest neighbouring villages are Aaramta, Sejoud and Al-Aaishiyah. Additionally, mountains outside the Lebanese boundaries can be seen from the top of the village and specifically from the Al Ksayri area. The Lebanon-Israel border is visible from the top of the village Sejoud.

== Demographics ==
In 2014, Muslims made up 97.19% of registered voters in Ar-Rihan. 95.09% of the voters were Shiite Muslims.

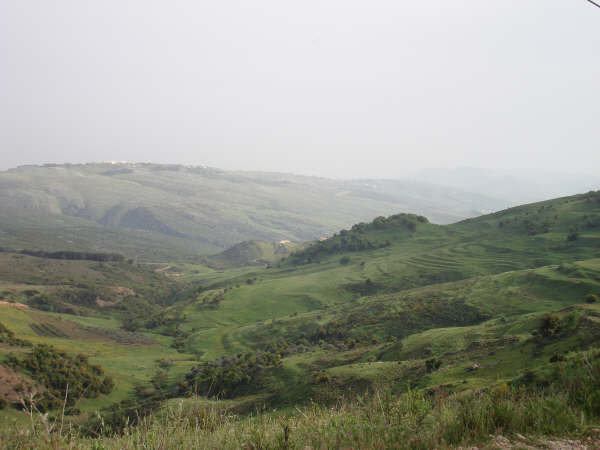
Ar-Rihan in the summer season.

The number of people inhabiting the village is estimated to be approximately 5000 people of Lebanese descent. Its inhabitants are also spread all over the world where most have migrated to various countries in the Middle East, Africa, North and South America, Canada and Europe.

== Flora and fauna ==
The village is mostly known for its abundance in water, cool weather in the summer season and beautiful natural sceneries. The temperature is at its most comfortable from April through June, and from mid-August to October.

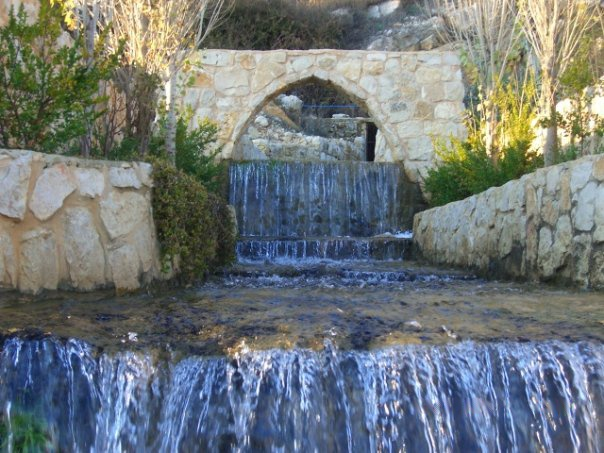
One of many water sources.

One walking through the village will find evergreen trees such as cypress and oak. Fruits such as figs, cherry, apricot, peach, some watermelons and plums. The village was recently assigned its own protected natural reserve.

The village is also home to walnut, pine nut and chestnut trees. Figs and olives are considered some of Rihans most important trees and are found in nearly every garden.

Various species of animals and birds can be encountered. Porcupines, golden jackals and wild boars are familiar sights. Foxes and striped hyenas are present although very rare to see.

Birds of prey such as buzzards are frequently found roaming the skies looking for wood mice, snakes or moles. The griffon vulture is present and with no human interference to its nesting areas.

Passerine birds like goldfinch (حسون), swallows (سنونو), house sparrows (دوري), hoopoes (هدهد) and many more flourish in the village’s trees and gardens. During the day bulbuls are often heard singing.

Chukars (حجل) are also found and can be hunted for sports.

== Landmarks ==
The village is home to two different interconnected karstic limestone caves with stalactite and stalagmite formations.

Rehans cave (Arabic: مغارة الريحان) is the smaller of the two and was discovered by a local at the end of the 1930s. It was only in 1951 that the local villagers were able to fully visit the cave, discovering its naturally carved statues, multiple rooms, passages and, of course, its beauty. It is widely known as Jeita of the south for its resemblance to the Jeita Grotto.

Recent Topography showed that the cave is approximately 185 m long. Although very inviting for the locals, they cannot go further than a 110 m since they are mal equipped and air and light become very scarce.

It is believed to be connected with the second and larger winter spring cave but there's no evidence of this claim yet.

The winter spring cave (Arabic: مغارة نبع الشتوي) is a 4.1 kilometers long cave found in what is called Khazem's Tract (Arabic: خلة خازم). Discovered in 1956, it is the 4th largest cave in Lebanon and the biggest of South Lebanon.

== Bibliography ==
- Hütteroth, W.-D.; Abdulfattah, K. (1977). Historical Geography of Palestine, Transjordan and Southern Syria in the Late 16th Century. Erlanger Geographische Arbeiten, Sonderband 5. Erlangen, Germany: Vorstand der Fränkischen Geographischen Gesellschaft. ISBN 3-920405-41-2.
- Rhode, H. (1979). Administration and Population of the Sancak of Safed in the Sixteenth Century. Columbia University. Archived from the original on 2019-04-20.
