= Marah al-Habas =

Marah al-Habas مراح الحباس
- Municipality
- Location in Lebanon
- Coordinates: 33°32′54.09″N 35°27′46.16″E
- Country: Lebanon
- Governorate: South Governorate
- District: Jezzine District
- Time zone: UTC+2 (EET)
  - Summer (DST): +3

Marah al-Habas (Arabic: مراح الحباس, romanized: Marāḥ al-Ḥabās) is a municipality in the Jezzine District of the South Governorate of Lebanon.

== Demographics ==
In 2014, Christians made up 99.19% of registered voters in Marah al-Habas. 79.78% of the voters were Greek Catholics and 13.75% were Maronite Catholics.
