= Baissour, Jezzine =

Baissour بيصور Baysour
- Municipality
- Location in Lebanon
- Coordinates: 33°32′6.46364″N 35°26′58.05784″E
- Country: Lebanon
- Governorate: South Governorate
- District: Jezzine District
- Time zone: UTC+2 (EET)
  - Summer (DST): +3

Baissour (Arabic: بيصور, romanized: Bayṣṣūr) is a municipality in the Jezzine District of the South Governorate of Lebanon.

== Demographics ==
In 2014, Christians made up 99.81% of registered voters in Baissour. 80.80% of the voters were Maronite Catholics and 13.31% were Greek Catholics.
