= Taaid =

Taaid تعيد
- Municipality
- Location in Lebanon
- Coordinates: 33.5741°N 35.5453°E
- Country: Lebanon
- Governorate: South Governorate
- District: Jezzine District
- Time zone: UTC+2 (EET)
  - Summer (DST): +3

Taaid (Arabic: تعيد) is a municipality in the Jezzine District of the South Governorate of Lebanon.

== Demographics ==
In 2014, Christians made up 99.24% of registered voters in Taaid. 90.84% of the voters were Maronite Catholics.
