= Bouslaiya =

Bouslaiya بصليا
- Municipality
- Location in Lebanon
- Coordinates: 33°30′4.00673″N 35°30′42.77646″E
- Country: Lebanon
- Governorate: South Governorate
- District: Jezzine District
- Time zone: UTC+2 (EET)
  - Summer (DST): +3

Bouslaiya (Arabic: بصليا, romanized: Buṣlaiyā) is a municipality in the Jezzine District of the South Governorate of Lebanon.

== Demographics ==
In 2014, Christians made up 99.55% of registered voters in Bouslaiya. 90.50% of the voters were Maronite Catholics.

== Mayor Incident ==
On the 24th of may 2025, during the municipal elections, the candidate for the Mukhtar elections Maroun Moubarak died of a sudden heart attack immediately after the announcement of his victory.
