= Bkassine =

Bkassine بكاسين Bkassin
- Municipality
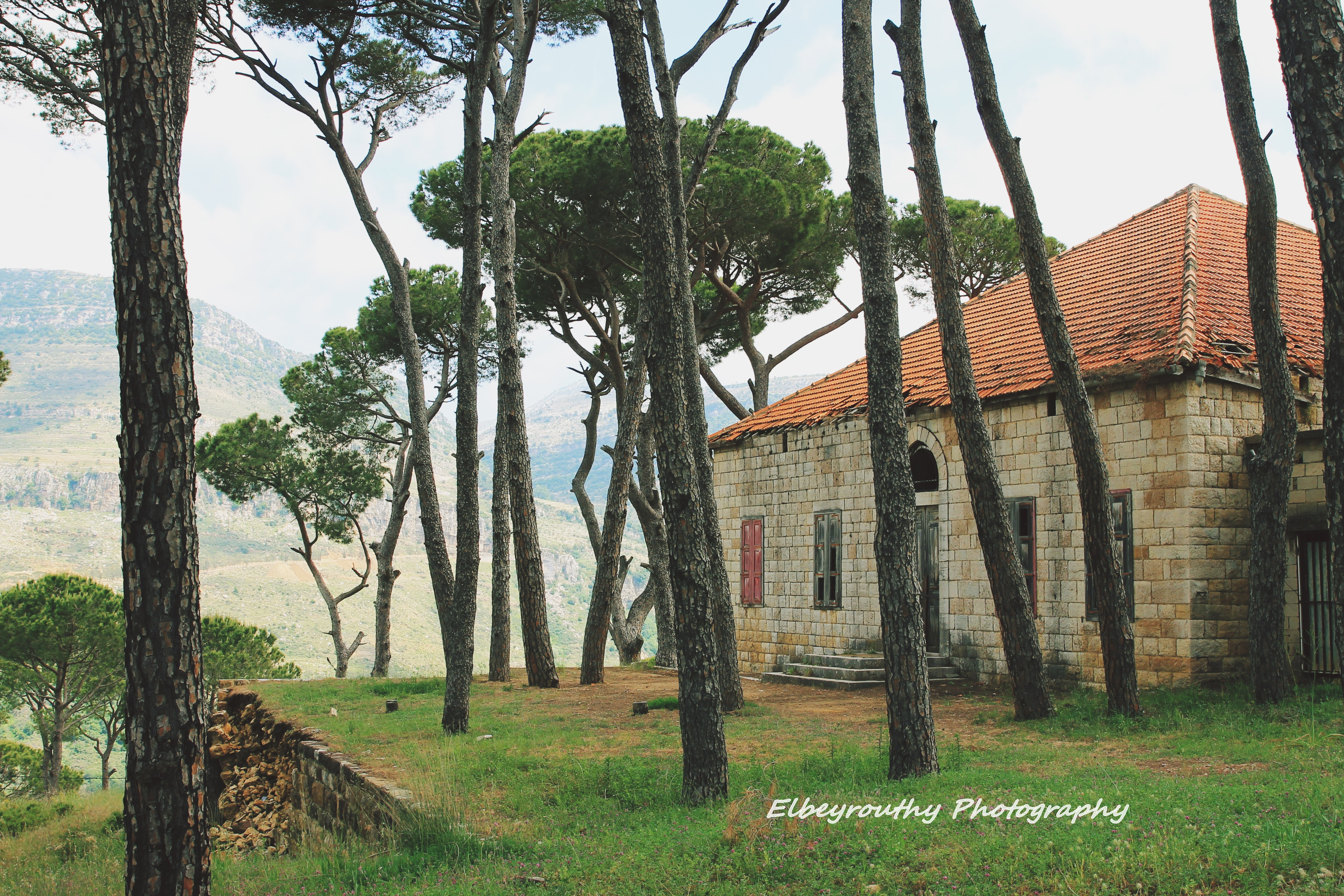
- Vista in Bkassine

- Location in Lebanon
- Coordinates: 33°34′01″N 35°34′40″E
- Country: Lebanon
- Governorate: South Governorate
- District: Jezzine District
- Elevation: 3,120 ft (950 m)
- Time zone: UTC+2 (EET)
  - Summer (DST): +3

Bkassine, Beit Kassin ("village of the disappeared") (Arabic: بكاسين, romanized: Bkāsīn), is a municipality in Lebanon surrounded by the Bkassine Pine Forest. The village is near Jezzine.

The village received a National Institute for Heritage award. The village is home to a church where an annual festival celebrating Saint Takla is held. The village includes a square, small souk, and houses adorned with distinctive red tiles.

Former U.S. senator from Maine George Mitchell's mother emigrated from Bkassine.

== Demographics ==
In 2014, Christians made up 97.25% of registered voters in Bkassine. 83.83% of the voters were Maronite Catholics.
