= Al-Lwaiza =

Al-Lwaiza اللويزه Louaiziye
- Municipality
- Location in Lebanon
- Coordinates: 33°27′37.31836″N 35°32′8.72358″E
- Country: Lebanon
- Governorate: South Governorate
- District: Jezzine District
- Time zone: UTC+2 (EET)
  - Summer (DST): +3

Al-Lwaiza (Arabic: اللويزه) is a municipality in the Jezzine District of the South Governorate of Lebanon.

== Demographics ==
In 2014, Muslims made up 99.38% of registered voters in Al-Lwaiza. 96.90% of the voters were Shiite Muslims.
