= Al-Ghabbatiyah =

Al-Ghabbatiyah الغباطية
- Municipality
- Location in Lebanon
- Coordinates: 33°34′40″N 35°35′04″E
- Country: Lebanon
- Governorate: South Governorate
- District: Jezzine District
- Time zone: UTC+2 (EET)
  - Summer (DST): +3

Al-Ghabbatiyah (Arabic: الغباطية, romanized: al-Ghabbāṭiyah) is a municipality in the Jezzine District of the South Governorate of Lebanon.

== Demographics ==
In 2014, Christians made up 99.71% of registered voters in Anan. 87.39% of the voters were Maronite Catholics.
