= Al-Qatrani, Lebanon =

Al-Qatrani القطراني Al-Katrani
- Municipality
- Location in Lebanon
- Coordinates: 33°26′24″N 35°36′12″E
- Country: Lebanon
- Governorate: South Governorate
- District: Jezzine District
- Time zone: UTC+2 (EET)
  - Summer (DST): +3

Al-Qatrani (Arabic: القطراني, romanized: al-Qaṭrānī), also spelled Al-Katrani, is a municipality in the Jezzine District of the South Governorate of Lebanon.

== Demographics ==
In 2014, Christians made up 74.10% and Druze made up 25.90% of registered voters in Al-Qatrani. 66.89% of the voters were Maronite Catholics.
