= Lebaa =

Village in the Jezzine District of southern Lebanon

Lebaa لبعا
- Municipality
- Location in Lebanon
- Coordinates: 33°32′52″N 35°27′11″E
- Country: Lebanon
- Governorate: South Governorate
- District: Jezzine District

Area
  - Total: 1.07 sq mi (2.77 km^{2})
- Elevation: 1,180 ft (360 m)
- Time zone: UTC+2 (EET)
  - Summer (DST): +3

Lebaa (Levantine Arabic: لبعا, romanized: Lebaʿā) is a municipality in the Jezzine District of the South Governorate of Lebanon, about 53 km south of Beirut.

== History ==
In 1838, Eli Smith noted Liba'ah, as a village located in "Aklim et-Tuffah, adjacent to Seida".

In 1875, Victor Guérin travelled in the area, and noted: "I cross a wady; then, climbing to the west of the slopes cultivated by terraces and planted with fig and olive trees, I stop for a few moments in Leba'a, a village divided into two quarters, whose population of 400 souls consists almost exclusively of Maronites. It must occupy the site of an ancient locality.

== Demographics ==
In 2014, Christians made up 99.11% of registered voters in Lebaa. 86.01% of the voters were Maronite Catholics.

== Bibliography ==
- Guérin, V. (1880). Description Géographique Historique et Archéologique de la Palestine (in French). Vol. 3: Galilee, pt. 2. Paris: L'Imprimerie Nationale.
- Robinson, E.; Smith, E. (1841). Biblical Researches in Palestine, Mount Sinai and Arabia Petraea: A Journal of Travels in the year 1838. Vol. 3. Boston: Crocker & Brewster.
