= Benwati =

Village in the Jezzine District of southern Lebanon

Benwati بنواتي Benouati
- Municipality
- Location in Lebanon
- Coordinates: 33°34′30″N 35°34′28″E
- Country: Lebanon
- Governorate: South Governorate
- District: Jezzine District

Area
  - Total: 0.65 sq mi (1.68 km^{2})
- Elevation: 2,720 ft (830 m)
- Time zone: UTC+2 (EET)
  - Summer (DST): +3

Benwati, (Levantine Arabic: بنواتي, romanized: Benwātī) is a municipality in the Jezzine District of the South Governorate of Lebanon, about 80 km south of Beirut.

== History ==
In 1838, Eli Smith noted Benwateh, as a village located in "Aklim et-Tuffah, adjacent to Seida".

== Demographics ==
In 2014, Muslims made up 98.67% of registered voters in Benwati. 91.08% of the voters were Sunni Muslims.

== Bibliography ==
- Robinson, E.; Smith, E. (1841). Biblical Researches in Palestine, Mount Sinai and Arabia Petraea: A Journal of Travels in the year 1838. Vol. 3. Boston: Crocker & Brewster.
