= Choualiq =

Choualiq شواليق Shawaliq
- Municipality
- Location in Lebanon
- Coordinates: 33°33′16″N 35°26′21″E
- Country: Lebanon
- Governorate: South Governorate
- District: Jezzine District
- Time zone: UTC+2 (EET)
  - Summer (DST): +3

Choualiq (Arabic: شواليق, romanized: Shwālīq) is a municipality in the Jezzine District of the South Governorate of Lebanon.

== Demographics ==
In 2014, Christians made up 99.13% of registered voters in Choualiq. 91.80% of the voters were Maronite Catholics.
