= Jarmaq =

Village in South Governorate, Lebanon

Jarmaq الجرمق
- Municipality
- Location in Lebanon
- Coordinates: 33°23′11″N 35°32′06″E
- Grid position: 130/161 L
- Country: Lebanon
- Governorate: South Governorate
- District: Jezzine District
- Elevation: 1,280 ft (390 m)
- Time zone: UTC+2 (EET)
  - Summer (DST): +3

Jarmaq (Arabic: الجرمق, romanized: al-Jarmaq) is a municipality in the Jezzine District in southern Lebanon, located 82 kilometers (51 mi) southeast of the capital Beirut. It has an altitude of 390 meters (1,280 ft). Its land area is 448 hectares. The village is a predominantly Maronite and Sunni settlement.

== History ==
The Syrian geographer Yaqut al-Hamawi (d. 1226) mentioned that Jarmaq was a district of Safed and the site of an ancient town by the same name. Yaqut notes a Hebrew tribe was called after the town.

In the 1596 tax records, it was named as a village, Jarman, in the Ottoman nahiya (subdistrict) of Shaqif Arnun, part of Safad Sanjak, with a population of 52 households and 6 bachelors, all Muslims. The villagers paid taxes on goats and beehives, "occasional revenues", a press for olive oil or grape syrup, "dulab", in addition to a fixed sum; a total of 5,502 akçe.

Following the 1982 invasion Jarmaq became part of the Israeli Security Zone. On 5 April 1992 Israeli soldiers shot dead two guerillas planting a roadside bomb in Al-Jarmaq. Five Israeli soldiers had been killed in first 14 weeks of 1992.

== Demographics ==
In 2014, Christians made up 74.73% and Muslims made up 25.05% of registered voters in Jarmaq. 65.12% of the voters were Maronite Catholics and 20.30% were Sunni Muslims.

== Bibliography ==
- Hütteroth, W.-D.; Abdulfattah, K. (1977). Historical Geography of Palestine, Transjordan and Southern Syria in the Late 16th Century. Erlanger Geographische Arbeiten, Sonderband 5. Erlangen, Germany: Vorstand der Fränkischen Geographischen Gesellschaft. ISBN 3-920405-41-2.
- Rhode, H. (1979). Administration and Population of the Sancak of Safed in the Sixteenth Century. Columbia University. Archived from the original on 2019-04-20.
- Strange, G. le (1890). Palestine Under the Moslems: A Description of Syria and the Holy Land from A.D. 650 to 1500. Committee of the Palestine Exploration Fund.
