= Al-Mjaidel =

Al-Mjaidel المجيدل
- Municipality
- Location in Lebanon
- Coordinates: 33°31′1.81″N 35°26′27.44″E
- Country: Lebanon
- Governorate: South Governorate
- District: Jezzine District
- Time zone: UTC+2 (EET)
  - Summer (DST): +3

Al-Mjaidel (Arabic: المجيدل, romanized: al-Mjaydel) is a municipality in the Jezzine District of the South Governorate of Lebanon.

== Demographics ==
In 2014, Christians made up 99.18% of registered voters in Al-Mjaidel. 88.39% of the voters were Maronite Catholics.
