= Al-Homsiye =

Al-Homsiye الحمصيه
- Municipality
- Location in Lebanon
- Coordinates: 33°32′55″N 35°33′20″E
- Country: Lebanon
- Governorate: South Governorate
- District: Jezzine District
- Time zone: UTC+2 (EET)
  - Summer (DST): +3

Al-Homsiye (Levantine Arabic: الحمصيه, romanized: al-Ḥomṣiyeh) is a municipality in the Jezzine District of the South Governorate of Lebanon.

== History ==
In 1838, Eli Smith noted it as el-Hummasiyeh, as a village located in "Aklim Jezzin, East of et-Tuffa".

== Demographics ==
In 2014, Christians made up 99.63% of registered voters in Al-Homsiye. 87.69% of the voters were Maronite Catholics.

== Bibliography ==
- Robinson, E.; Smith, E. (1841). Biblical Researches in Palestine, Mount Sinai and Arabia Petraea: A Journal of Travels in the year 1838. Vol. 3. Boston: Crocker & Brewster.
