= Al-Maknouniyah =

Al-Maknouniyah المكنونية
- Municipality
- Location in Lebanon
- Coordinates: 33°31′44.54″N 35°32′55.21″E
- Country: Lebanon
- Governorate: South Governorate
- District: Jezzine District
- Time zone: UTC+2 (EET)
  - Summer (DST): +3

Al-Maknouniyah (Arabic: المكنونية, romanized: al-Maknūniyah) is a municipality in the Jezzine District of the South Governorate of Lebanon.

== Demographics ==
In 2014, Christians made up 98.92% of registered voters in Al-Maknouniyah. 88.14% of the voters were Maronite Catholics.
