= Zhalta =

Zhalta زحلتا
- Municipality
- Location in Lebanon
- Coordinates: 33°30′43″N 35°32′56″E
- Country: Lebanon
- Governorate: South Governorate
- District: Jezzine District
- Time zone: UTC+2 (EET)
  - Summer (DST): +3

Zhalta (Arabic: زحلتا, romanized: Zḥaltā) is a municipality in the Jezzine District of the South Governorate of Lebanon.

== Demographics ==
In 2014, Christians made up 99.60% of registered voters in Zhalta. 88.89% of the voters were Maronite Catholics.
