= Aray, Lebanon =

Aaray عاراي
- Municipality
- Location within Lebanon
- Coordinates: 33°34′12″N 35°35′43″E
- Country: Lebanon
- Governorate: South Governorate
- District: Jezzine District
- Elevation: 650 m (2,130 ft)
- Time zone: UTC+2 (EET)
  - Summer (DST): UTC+3 (EEST)
- Dialing code: +961

Aaray (Arabic: عاراي, romanized: ʿĀrāy) is a mountainous municipality in Jezzine, Lebanon.

== Etymology ==
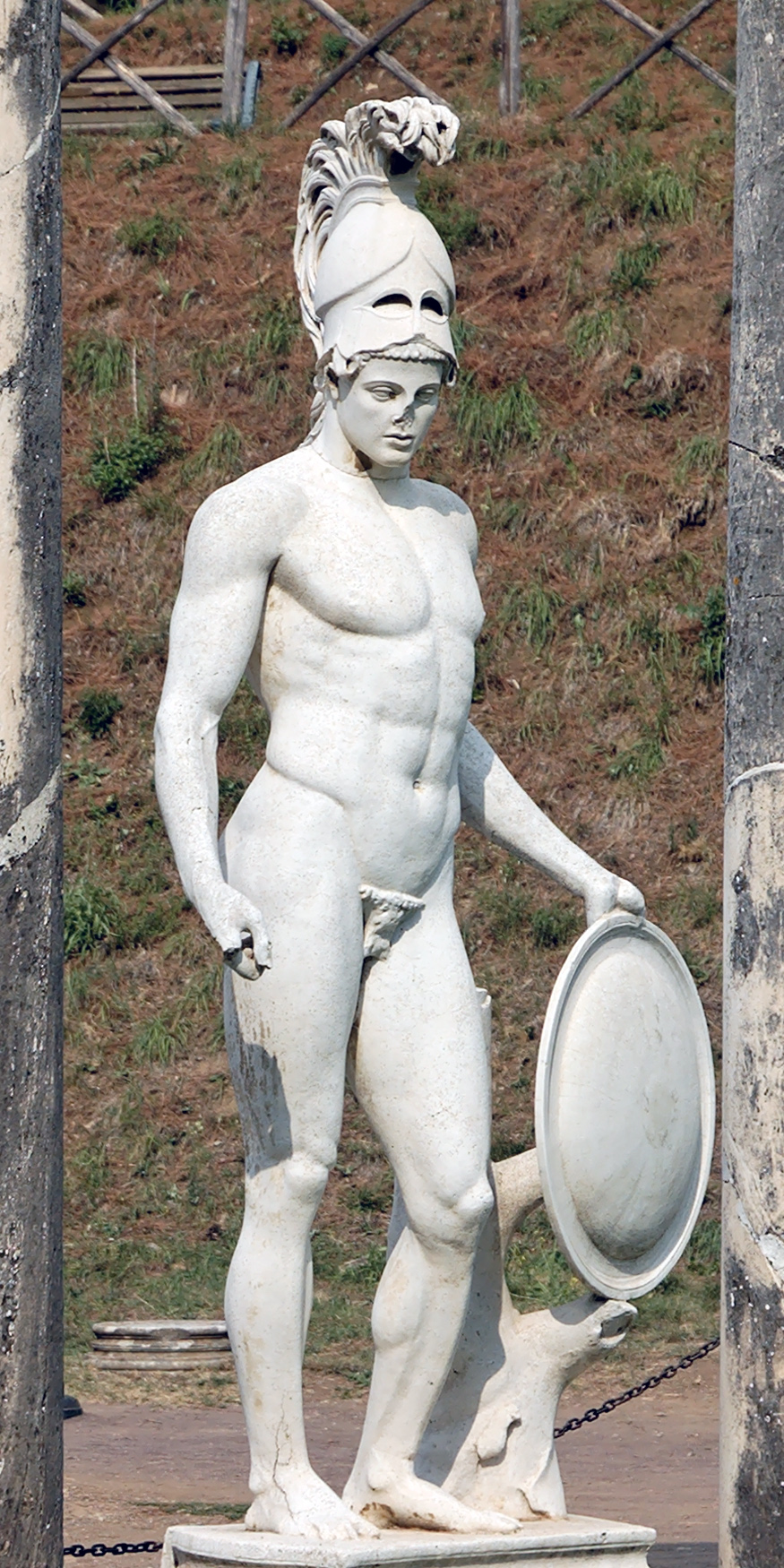
Aray is named in honor of Ares, God of Warfare

The name of the village, Aaray, is derived from the Greek god of warfare, Ares.

== Geography ==
Aaray lies in a valley below Jezzine within the Bkassine forest. Aray is rich in springs and streams, especially the Aray Stream, which is the principal tributary of the Awali river in South Lebanon.

== Demographics ==
In 2014, Christians made up 92.48% and Druze made up 7.06% of registered voters in Aaray. 86.57% of the voters were Maronite Catholics.

== Economy ==
Aaray is a regional producer of grapes, olives, pines, and jujube. The village is a major producer of olive-oil and olive-oil soap as well as pine nuts.
