= Machmouche =

Machmouche مشموشة Mashmoushah
- Municipality
- Location in Lebanon
- Coordinates: 33°34′44″N 35°34′10″E
- Country: Lebanon
- Governorate: South Governorate
- District: Jezzine District
- Time zone: UTC+2 (EET)
  - Summer (DST): +3

Machmouche (Arabic: مشموشة, romanized: Mashmūsheh) is a municipality in the Jezzine District of the South Governorate of Lebanon.

== Demographics ==
In 2014, Christians made up 99.78% of registered voters in Machmouche. 88.89% of the voters were Maronite Catholics.
