= Saidoun =

Saidoun صيدون Saydoun
- Municipality
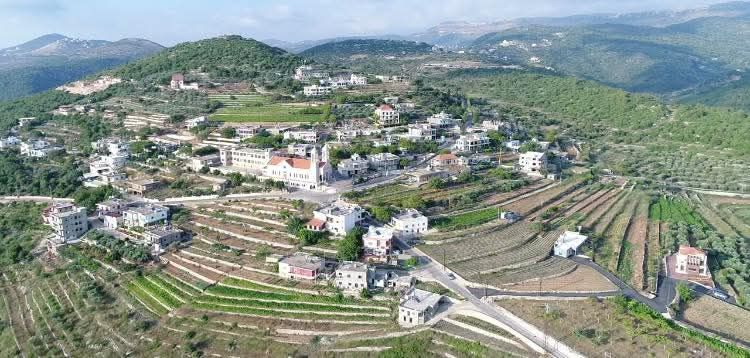

- Location in Lebanon
- Coordinates: 33°31′16″N 35°30′46″E
- Country: Lebanon
- Governorate: South Governorate
- District: Jezzine District
- Elevation: 2,600 ft (800 m)
- Time zone: UTC+2 (EET)
  - Summer (DST): +3

Saidoun (Arabic: صيدون, romanized: Ṣaydūn) is a municipality in the Jezzine District of the South Governorate of Lebanon.

== Demographics ==
In 2014, Christians made up 99.82% of registered voters in Saidoun. 95.40% of the voters were Maronite Catholics.
