= As-Srira =

As-Srira السريرة
- Municipality
- Location in Lebanon
- Coordinates: 33°26′8.5″N 35°37′22.42″E
- Country: Lebanon
- Governorate: South Governorate
- District: Jezzine District
- Time zone: UTC+2 (EET)
  - Summer (DST): +3

As-Srira (Arabic: السريرة, romanized: as-Srīra) is a municipality in the Jezzine District of the South Governorate of Lebanon.

== Demographics ==
In 2014, Druze made up 99.14% of registered voters in As-Srira.
