= Sabah, Lebanon =

Sabbah صبّاح
- Municipality
- Location in Lebanon
- Coordinates: 33°34′4.1″N 35°33′55.45″E
- Country: Lebanon
- Governorate: South Governorate
- District: Jezzine District
- Time zone: UTC+2 (EET)
  - Summer (DST): +3

Sabbah (Arabic: صبّاح, romanized: Ṣabbaḥ) is a municipality in the Jezzine District of the South Governorate of Lebanon.

== Demographics ==
In 2014, Christians made up 99.59% of registered voters in Sabbah. 88.16% of the voters were Maronite Catholics.
