= Al-Midan, Lebanon =

Al-Midan الميدان
- Municipality
- Location in Lebanon
- Coordinates: 33°34′49.09840″N 35°33′49.25045″E
- Country: Lebanon
- Governorate: South Governorate
- District: Jezzine District
- Time zone: UTC+2 (EET)
  - Summer (DST): +3

Al-Midan (Arabic: الميدان, romanized: al-Mīdān) is a municipality in the Jezzine District of the South Governorate of Lebanon.

== Demographics ==
In 2014, Christians made up 98.79% of registered voters in Al-Midan. 87.23% of the voters were Maronite Catholics.
