= Wadi Jezzine =

Village in the Jezzine District of southern Lebanon

Wadi Jezzine وادي جزين Ouadi Jezzine
- Municipality
- Location in Lebanon
- Coordinates: 33°33′02″N 35°34′46″E
- Country: Lebanon
- Governorate: South Governorate
- District: Jezzine District

Area
  - Total: 0.42 sq mi (1.10 km^{2})
- Elevation: 2,660 ft (810 m)
- Time zone: UTC+2 (EET)
  - Summer (DST): +3

Wadi Jezzine (Arabic: وادي جزين, romanized: Wādī Jizzīn) is a municipality in the Jezzine District of the South Governorate of Lebanon, about 75 km south of Beirut.

== History ==
In 1838, Eli Smith noted Wady Jezzin as a village by Jezzin, "East of et-Tuffa".

== Demographics ==
In 2014, Christians made up 99.31% of registered voters in Wadi Jezzine. 89.02% of the voters were Maronite Catholics.

== Bibliography ==
- Robinson, E.; Smith, E. (1841). Biblical Researches in Palestine, Mount Sinai and Arabia Petraea: A Journal of Travels in the year 1838. Vol. 3. Boston: Crocker & Brewster.
