= Ain Majdalain =

Ain Majdalain عين مجدلين
- Municipality
- Location in Lebanon
- Coordinates: 33°31′17.36051″N 35°36′9.43664″E
- Country: Lebanon
- Governorate: South Governorate
- District: Jezzine District
- Time zone: UTC+2 (EET)
  - Summer (DST): +3

Ain Majdalain (Arabic: عين مجدلين, romanized: ʿAyn Majdalayn) is a municipality in the Jezzine District of the South Governorate of Lebanon.

== Demographics ==
In 2014, Christians made up 99.47% of registered voters in Ain Majdalain. 95.95% of the voters were Maronite Catholics.
