= Sfaray =

Village in the Jezzine District of southern Lebanon

Sfaray صفاريه
- Municipality
- Location in Lebanon
- Coordinates: 33°33′17″N 35°29′38″E
- Country: Lebanon
- Governorate: South Governorate
- District: Jezzine District

Area
  - Total: 1.78 sq mi (4.61 km^{2})
- Elevation: 1,710 ft (520 m)
- Time zone: UTC+2 (EET)
  - Summer (DST): +3

Sfaray (Arabic: صفاريه) is a municipality in the Jezzine District of the South Governorate of Lebanon, about 53 km south of Beirut.

== History ==
In 1838, Eli Smith noted Sufareih, as a village located in "Aklim et-Tuffah, adjacent to Seida".

== Demographics ==
In 2014, Christians made up 99.34% of registered voters in Sfaray. 87.81% of the voters were Maronite Catholics.

== Bibliography ==
- Robinson, E.; Smith, E. (1841). Biblical Researches in Palestine, Mount Sinai and Arabia Petraea: A Journal of Travels in the year 1838. Vol. 3. Boston: Crocker & Brewster.
