= Snaya =

Snaya سنيا
- Municipality
- Location in Lebanon
- Coordinates: 33°31′03″N 35°31′41″E
- Country: Lebanon
- Governorate: South Governorate
- District: Jezzine District
- Time zone: UTC+2 (EET)
  - Summer (DST): +3

Snaya (Arabic: سنيا) is a municipality in the Jezzine District of the South Governorate of Lebanon.

== History ==
In 1838, Eli Smith noted it as Seneiya, as a village located in "Aklim Jezzin, East of et-Tuffa".

== Demographics ==
In 2014, Christians made up 99.73% of registered voters in Snaya. 94.67% of the voters were Maronite Catholics.

== Bibliography ==
- Robinson, E.; Smith, E. (1841). Biblical Researches in Palestine, Mount Sinai and Arabia Petraea: A Journal of Travels in the year 1838. Vol. 3. Boston: Crocker & Brewster.
