= Haitoura =

Haitoura حيطورة Haytoura
- Municipality
- Location in Lebanon
- Coordinates: 33°31′11″N 35°33′13″E
- Country: Lebanon
- Governorate: South Governorate
- District: Jezzine District
- Time zone: UTC+2 (EET)
  - Summer (DST): +3

Haitoura (Arabic: حيطورة, romanized: Ḥayṭūra) is a municipality in the Jezzine District of the South Governorate of Lebanon.

== Demographics ==
In 2014, Christians made up 99.28% of registered voters in Haitoura. 89.92% of the voters were Maronite Catholics.
