= Amal Abou Zeid =

Lebanese politician (born 1953)

- أمل أبو زيد
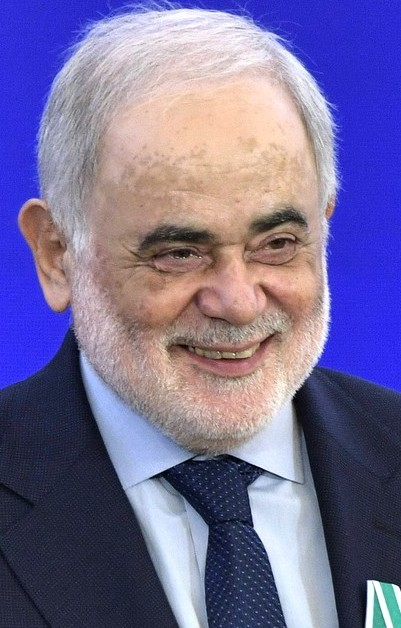
- Amal Abou Zeid in 2019

Member of the Lebanese Parliament

Personal details
- Born: 12 June 1953 (age 73) Mlikh
- Citizenship: Lebanese
- Education: London Business School, Institute of Oriental Studies of the Russian Academy of Sciences
- Occupation: Politician

Amal Abou Zeid (born 12 June 1953) is a former Member of the Lebanese Parliament. He was a member of the National Commission for Economy, Trade, Industry and Planning in the Lebanese Parliament. He served as the advisor to Lebanese President Gen. Michel Aoun for the Lebanese-Russian Affairs between 2016 and 2022.

== Biography ==
Born in Mlikh, Abou Zeid completed his education at Good Shepherd School, then moved to the United Kingdom to pursue his academic studies where he obtained his master's degree from The London Business School.

Amal Abou Zeid established his first investment company in London under the name of “ADICO Investment Corporation” in 1980. Abou Zeid expanded the business of “ADICO Investment Corporation” in 2000, through establishing the company in Moscow – Russia and worked on enhancing the Business & Economical relation between the Russian and Lebanese Diaspora.

In 2001 Abou Zeid co-founded and then became a Member of the American Lebanese Chamber of Commerce, an official non-profit organization aiming at facilitating and developing business and trade relations between Lebanon and the United States. He also became a member of the International Chamber of Commerce -Lebanon, in 2002.

Amal Abou Zeid is an activist in the Maronite community. He was appointed in 2009 member of the Lebanese Maronite diaspora Foundation which aims to reconnect Lebanese Maronite emigrants around the world with their native country through continuous communication and cooperation, management of important emigration affairs and by pushing non-registered Lebanese emigrants to register themselves and their families with the Lebanese state to obtain citizenship.

Moreover, in 2010, Abou Zeid was elected President of the “Maronite Rural affairs committee” in “The Maronite League”. The committee handles, in cooperation with various organizations and municipalities around the country, the development of certain projects in Maronite rural areas in the goal of encouraging Maronites to stay in their villages and prevent their migration to the capital Beirut or to outside Lebanon. In 2011 the Maronite Patriarch Mar Bechara Boutros Al-Rai appointed Amal Abou Zeid as board member in The Maronite Social Fund Council, a non-profit organization established by the Maronite church in the goal of raising money to develop low-cost housing projects to accommodate young Maronite couples or under-privileged Maronite families.

In 2014, the Lebanese Foreign Affairs Minister Mr. Gebran Bassil appointed Abou Zeid as advisor for the Lebanese-Russian affairs in the ministry.

In 2015, Abou Zeid was appointed board member at OTV, one of the famous TV stations in the country.

== Awards and honors ==
Amal Abou Zeid is the first Lebanese holding an Honorary Doctorate from the Institute of Oriental Studies of the Russian Academy of Sciences, awarded to him in 2015.

Abou Zeid was also decorated, in 2015, with the Order of Saint Gregory the Great with the papal benediction of Pope Francis as an act of recognition to his role in building a better society in Lebanon.

In 2019, Russian President Vladimir Putin decorated him with the Russian Order of Friendship in appreciation for his role in strengthening the Lebanese-Russian relationship politically, culturally, clerically, and economically.
