= Jean Makaron =

- جان معكرون
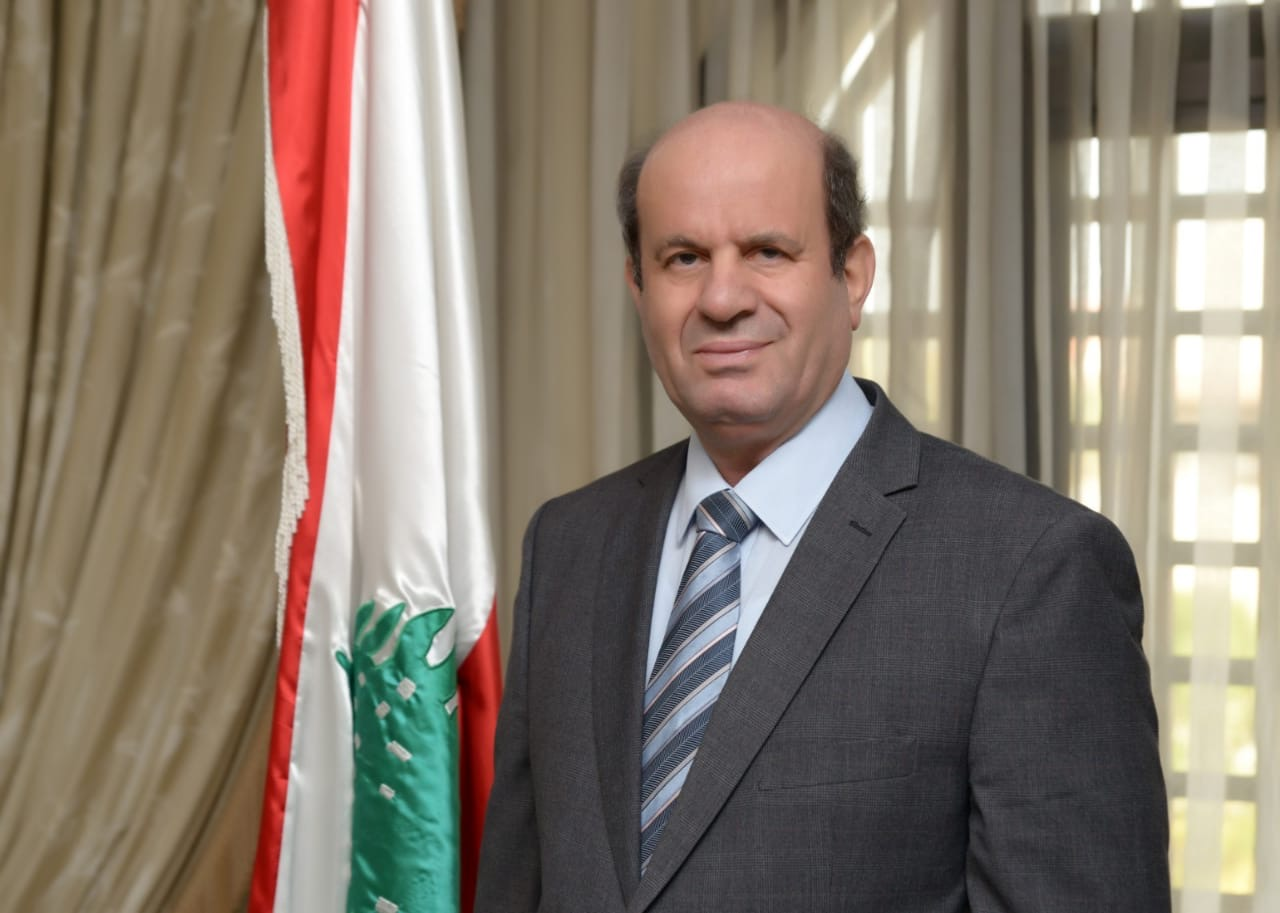
- Born: June 7, 1956 (age 70); Rayak, Lebanon
- Education: Lebanese University
- Spouse: Graziella Saliba

Jean Wadih Makaron (Arabic: جان وديع معكرون; born 7 June 1956) is a Lebanese career diplomat, jurist and academic who served as Lebanon Ambassador from 2007 to 2020 in the Republic of Cuba and Armenia.

He served in several diplomatic missions including London, United Kingdom; Los Angeles, USA; Athens, Greece; Melbourne, Australia; Kuwait City, Kuwait.

== Early life and education ==
Makaron was born in Rayak in the Beqaa Governorate in 1956. Born in a prominent Catholic Melkite family, his father Wadih Makaron was mukhtar of Rayak from 1964 until 1996.

He completed his university education at the Lebanese University where he graduated with a bachelor's degree in Law, History and Political science in 1982 and obtained a master's degree in Public law. From 1987 to 1992, Makaron was a lecturer at the Lebanese University, during which time he also received a doctorate in Public Law.

== Diplomatic career ==
Makaron began his diplomatic career as an attaché the Ministry of Foreign Affairs in 1992 before being deployed on foreign mission to the Lebanese Embassy in London.

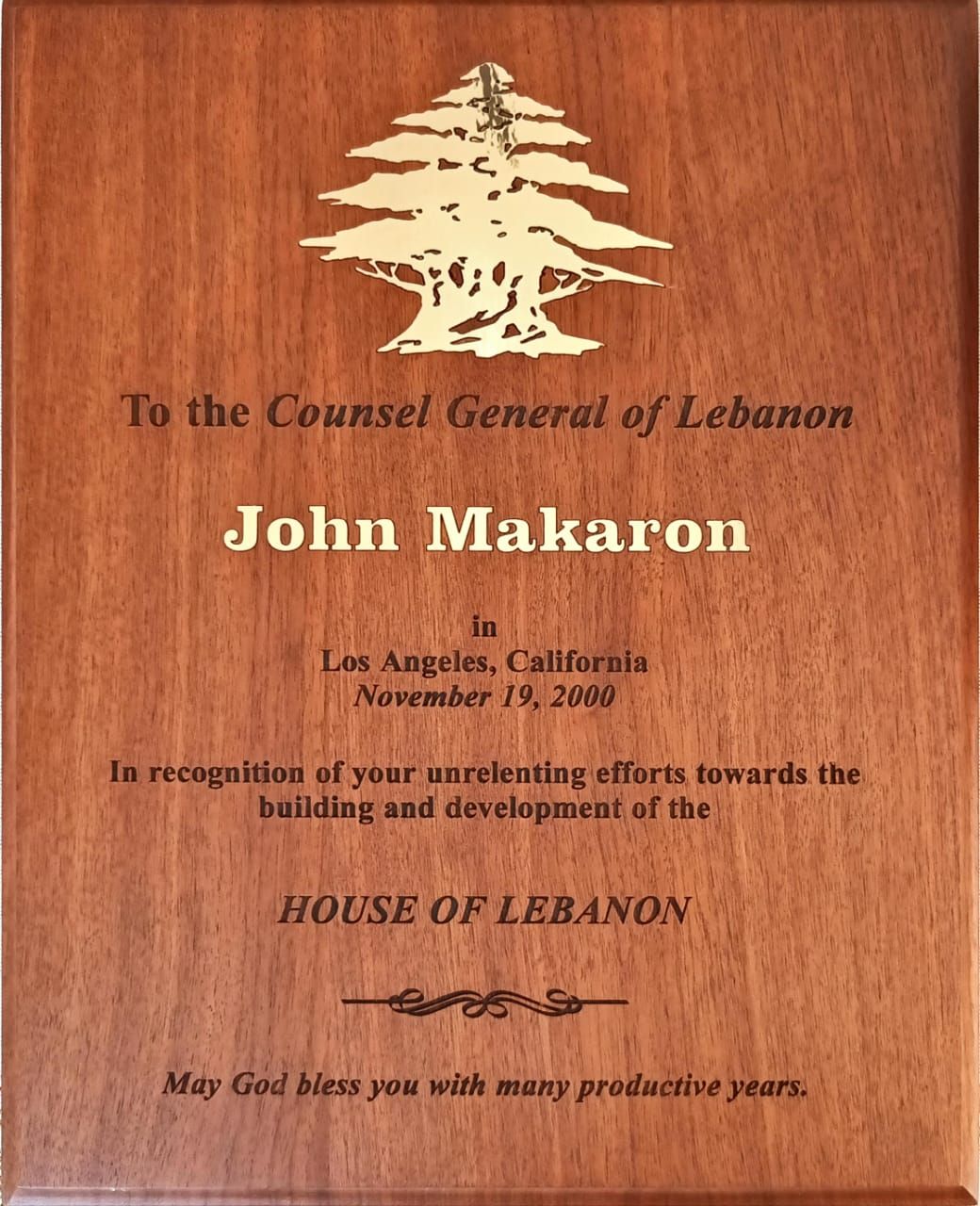
Commemorative plaque, displayed in the House of Lebanon in Los Angeles, California

He was chosen as the general consul of Lebanon to Los Angeles, California, United States of America from 1999 to 2001. He notably worked on creating the Lebanese American Foundation, which has been formed to establish the House of Lebanon in the Los Angeles area, a non-profit organization focused on connecting the Lebanese Community in Southern California.

He was appointed general consul of Lebanon to Melbourne, Australia in 2006 and served in this capacity until 2007 when he was appointed Ambassador Plenipotentiary and Extraordinary of Lebanon to the Republic of Cuba.

In 2013 Makaron was appointed ambassador to the Republic of Armenia, where he strengthened ties between Lebanon and Armenia and promoted economic and political cooperation in various projects within Lebanon most notably with the launching of the Middle East Airlines flight connecting Beirut and Yerevan, while also deepening bilateral cooperation in the domain of justice between the Ministry of Justice of Armenia and Lebanon. He also launched the Ambassadors without Borders Organisation.

In 2019 Makaron was appointed as the chargé affairs to Lebanese embassy in the state of Kuwait where he played a significant role in developing Lebanese-Kuwaiti relations. He also contributed to the establishment of a Lebanese Economic Council in Kuwait, which contributes to strengthening economic, investment and trade relations between the Lebanese business community in Kuwait and the Kuwaiti business community and government bodies.

Makaron has also been a delegate of Lebanon in many conferences within the United Nations.

== Personal life ==
Makaron married lawyer Graziella Saliba in June 1995. They have two children.

== External activities ==
Member of the International Institute for Strategic Studies (IISS), London since 1998.
