= Riyak railway station =

Passenger railway station in Riyak, Lebanon

Riyaq Rayak
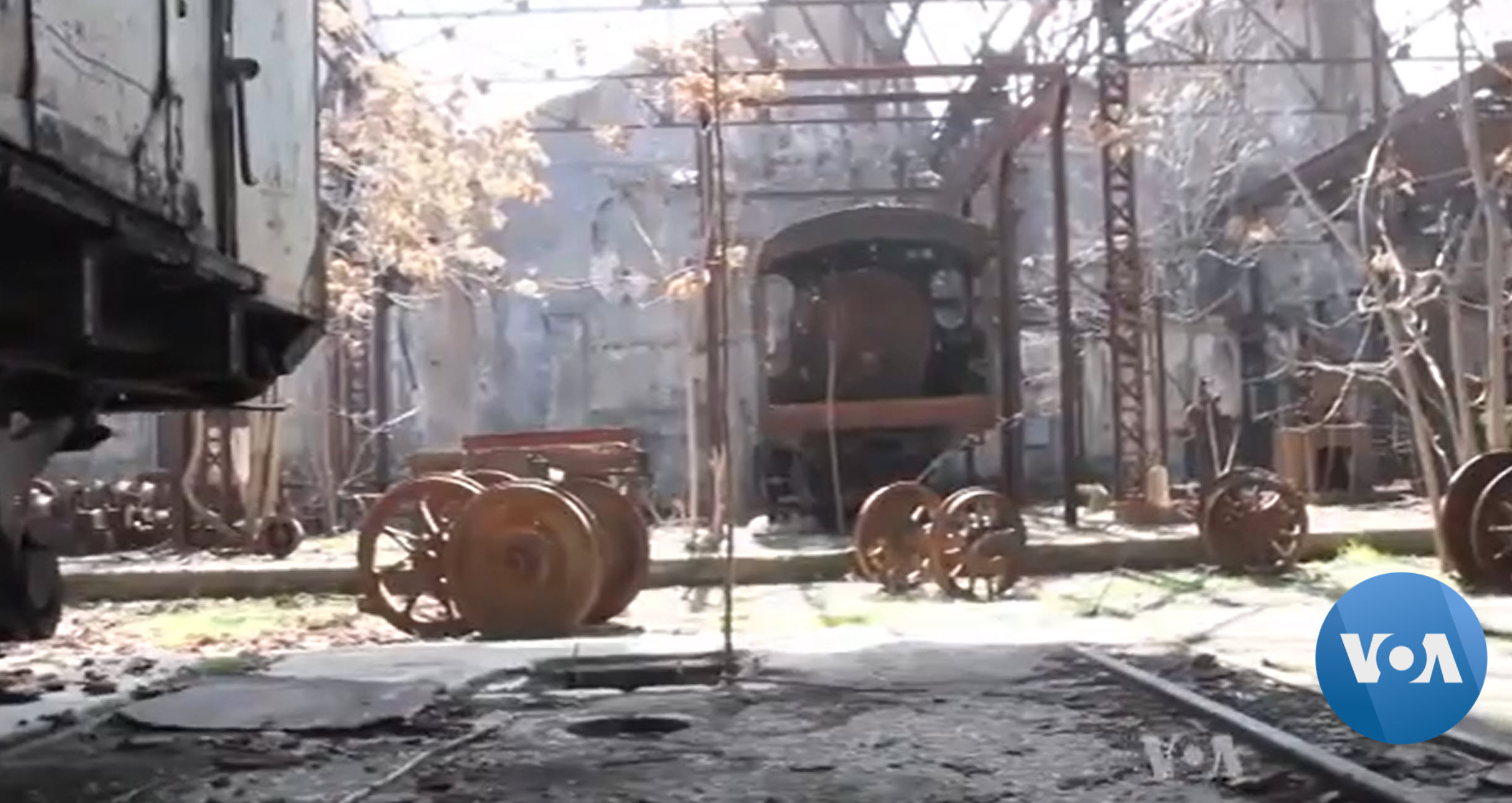
- The abandoned station in 2016.

General information
- Location: Lebanon
- Operator: Société Ottomane du Chemins de fer de Damas-Hamah et Prolongements (DHP)

Construction
- Architectural style: French architectural style

History
- Opened: 1895
- Closed: circa 1975

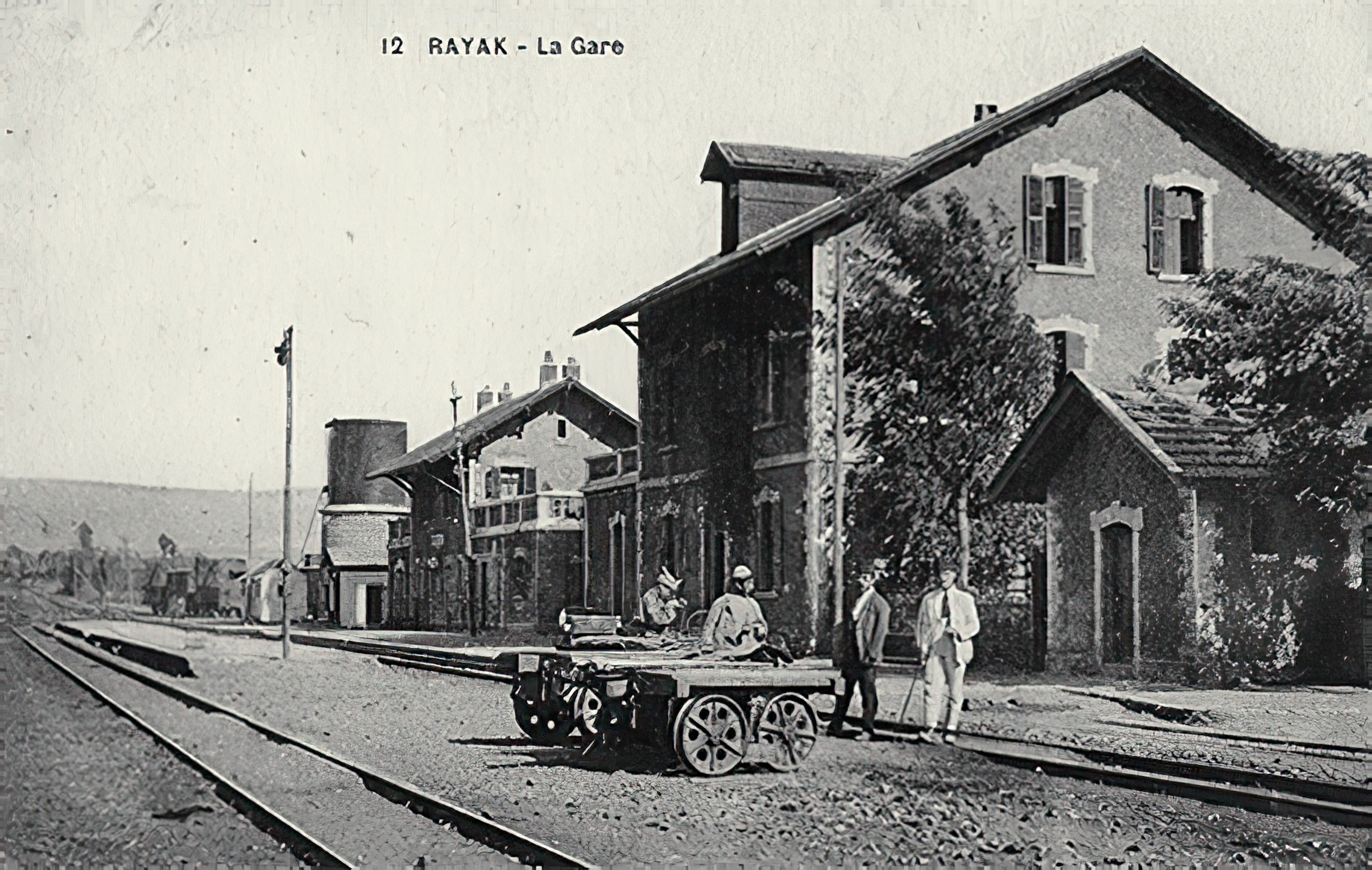
Riyak railway station, about 1920.

The Riyak Railway Station is a former passenger railway station and railway repair shop, located in Riyak, Lebanon. Riyak was a strategically-located station within the Lebanese railway system; it acted as a railway junction, with the main branch to Syria towards the cities of Homs and Damascus (eventually reaching Mosul, Iraq) as well as a large repair facility. The station complex had nine buildings, including a hotel, a telecommunications center and a ticket office. Other buildings onsite included a military center, a postal station, the employee lounge and a security building.

The first train arrived in Riyaq from Beirut in 1895.

== History ==
The Riyak railway complex covered 35 400 square metres. It has 48 buildings where railway workers built spare parts and did maintenance work on rolling stock. As of 2018, many of the building are still extant, albeit in a very poor state of conservation. Between the two world wars, the Rayak station was the busiest station on the railway, connecting the region's capitals and Damascus to Europe.

The site served an important military location; during the First World War, the station served as a marshaling point for Ottoman troops. During the Second World War, the repair complex was transformed into a military base, used to build airplanes for the French Air Force. The repair complex was notably used to convert the railway's steam locomotives from coal fuel to oil burners.

During the Lebanese Civil War, the site was captured by the Syrian Army and some of the buildings were used as detention or torture centers. The Syrians left in 2005.

An attempt to convert the site to a museum in 2010 was halted due to the lack of support from local politicians.

== Description of the complex ==
The eastern portion of the repair complex is noted to have two rail lines: the “Straight Rail” and the “Curved Rail”. The “Straight Rail” connects the station to Beirut and to a British military Base in Terbul; this line was closed in the 1940s. The “Curved Rail” connects the passenger station to the repair factory complex and goes from there to the city of Homs. The western portion of the station has a rail line that goes to Damascus. To the north of the complex, there are five rails, three of which were used for passenger trains and two for goods loading. Finally, two rails along the southern portion are used to redirect locomotives.

The repair shop area of the complex was divided into two parts: a factory area and a storage area. The factory portion of the complex had twenty-five buildings which included a metallurgy complex, a tool repair area, a mechanical machinery division, the main engine room, a plumbing workshop, a drawing room, an air compressor room, a paint shop, a brake repair shop, three foundry areas and three assembly areas. The other half of the facility was used for personnel and included the carpentry shop, the engineer's offices, a medical clinic, an electric plant, a locomotive storage area, a restaurant, dormitories, a stores head office, a train station used for railway personnel, a ticketing office, two security towers, four security cabins, a fuel center and a food storage center.
