= Aaramta =

Aaramta عرمتى 'Aramta
- Municipality
- Location in Lebanon
- Coordinates: 33°27′50″N 35°34′35″E
- Grid position: 134/169 L
- Country: Lebanon
- Governorate: South Governorate
- District: Jezzine District
- Elevation: 3,380 ft (1,030 m)
- Time zone: UTC+2 (EET)
  - Summer (DST): +3

Aaramta (Arabic: عرمتى, romanized: ʿAramtā; Classical Syriac: ܥܪܡܬܐ) is a municipality in the Jezzine District in southern Lebanon.

== Etymology ==
Its name comes from Syriac-Aramaic ܥܪܡܐ (ʿarma), feminine counterpart being ܥܪܡܬܐ (ʿarmta), which means 'rugged', 'rough', 'steep', or 'high'.

== History ==
In the 1596 tax records, the village was named in the Ottoman nahiya (subdistrict) of Sagif under the liwa' (district) of Safad, with a population of 14 households, all Muslim. The villagers paid a fixed tax-rate of 25% on agricultural products, such as wheat, barley, fruit trees, goats and beehives, in addition to "occasional revenues"; a total of 1,355 akçe.

On 14 April 1994 three SLA militiamen were killed by a landmine near the village. In response the SLA shelled Sidon killing three civilians. Two days later the SLA attacked Aaramta killing two people and expelling the villagers to Jezzine. Five SLA men had been killed the same day near Jezzine.

In May 2023, Hezbollah's Redwan Force conducted training exercises near the village, as part of a media tour aimed at showcasing the organization's military prowess. These drills encompassed various demonstrations, such as drone displays that featured flags, hand-to-hand combat, explosive exercises, and simulations of cross-border incursions into Israel.

== Demographics ==
In 2014, Muslims made up 97.94% of registered voters in Aaramta. 95.27% of the voters were Shiite Muslims.

== Bibliography ==
- Hütteroth, W.-D.; Abdulfattah, K. (1977). Historical Geography of Palestine, Transjordan and Southern Syria in the Late 16th Century. Erlanger Geographische Arbeiten, Sonderband 5. Erlangen, Germany: Vorstand der Fränkischen Geographischen Gesellschaft. ISBN 3-920405-41-2.
- Rhode, H. (1979). Administration and Population of the Sancak of Safed in the Sixteenth Century (PhD). Columbia University. Archived from the original on 2019-04-20.
