= Oholiab =

Person in the Hebrew Bible

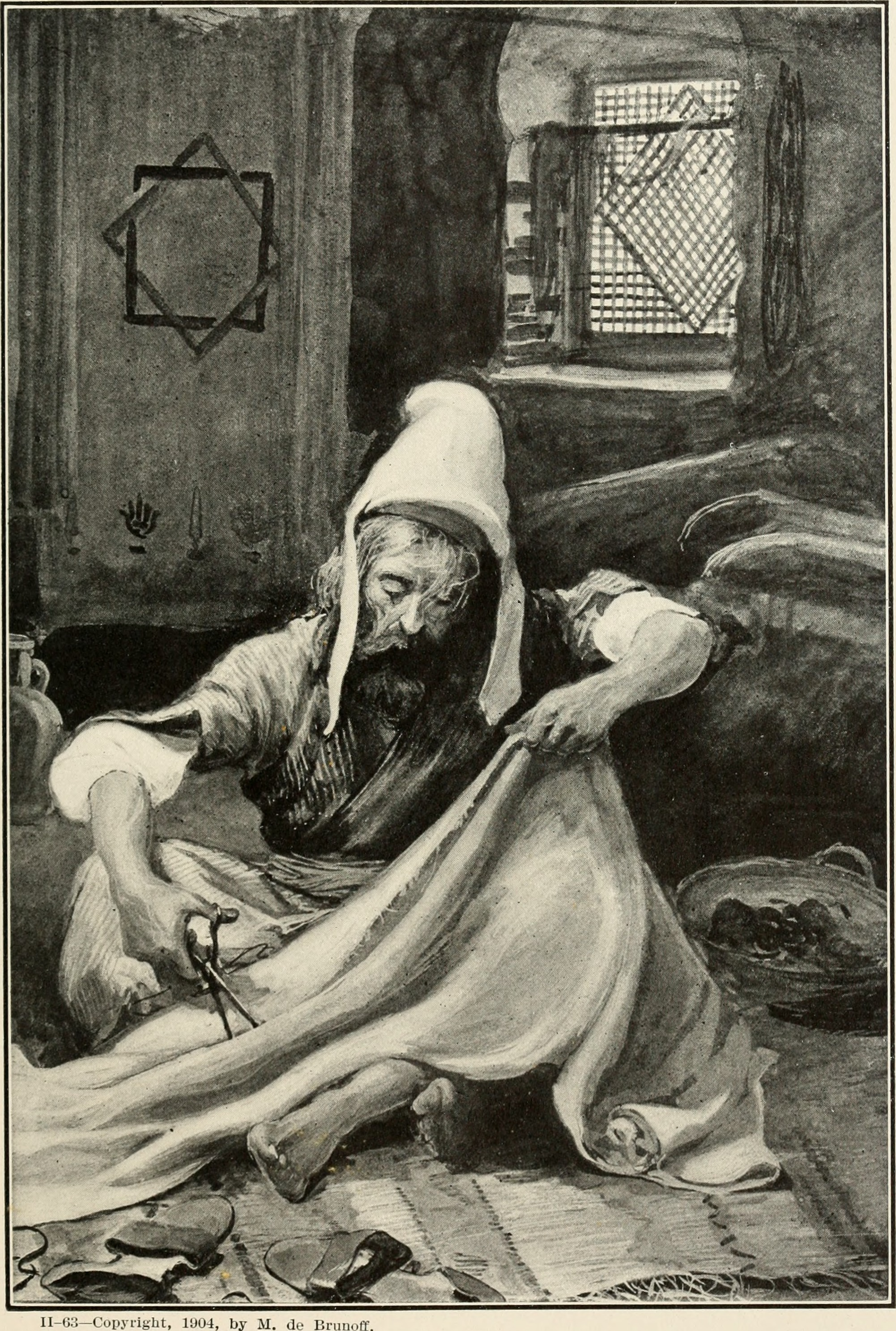
Aholiab making the curtains of the tabernacle and priestly vestments (Maurice de Brunhoff, 1908).

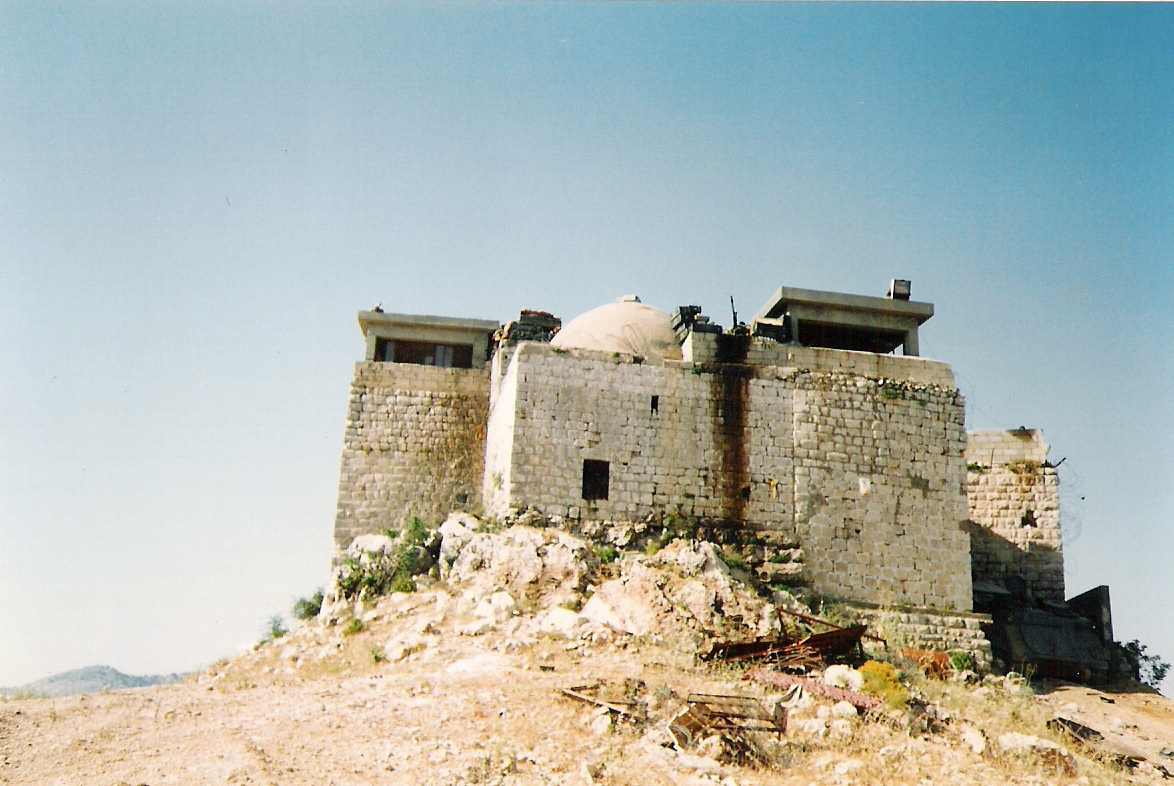
Nabi Sujud shrine for Aholiab Ben Akhisamakh, located in Jezzine District.

In the Hebrew Bible, Oholiab (Hebrew: אָהֳלִיאָב, romanized: ʾOhŏliʾāb̲, lit. 'My Tent [is] the Father'), son of Ahisamach, of the tribe of Dan, worked under Bezalel as the deputy architect of the Tabernacle and the implements which it housed, including the Ark of the Covenant. He is described in Exodus 38:23 as a master of carpentry, weaving, and embroidery.
