= Jezzine District =

District in the South Governorate of Lebanon

Coordinates: 33.5419°N 35.5842°E

- District
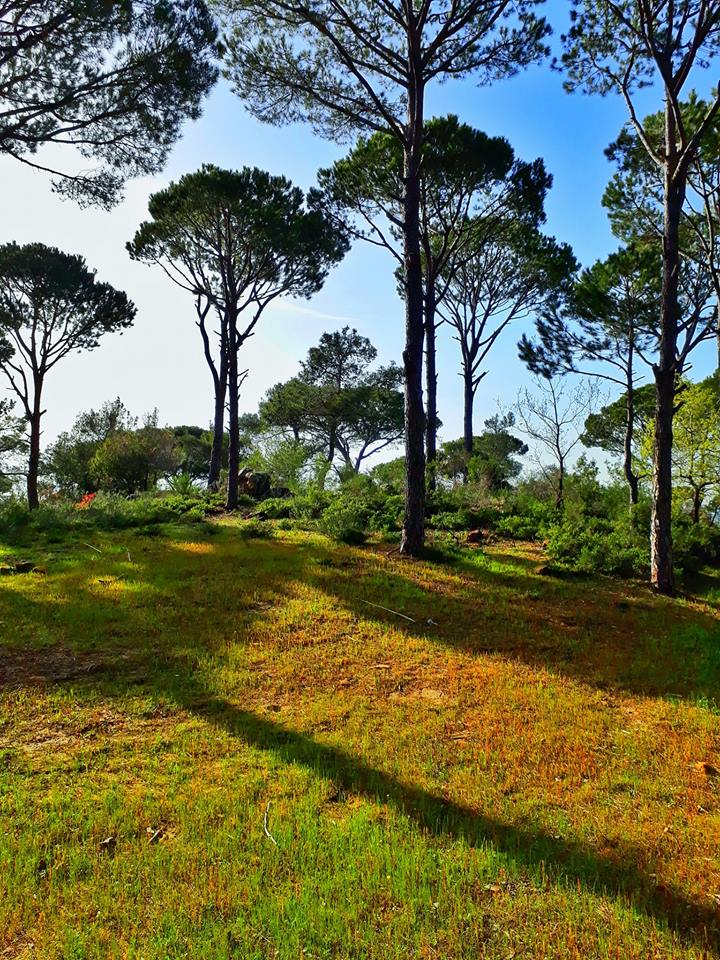
- Jezzine District

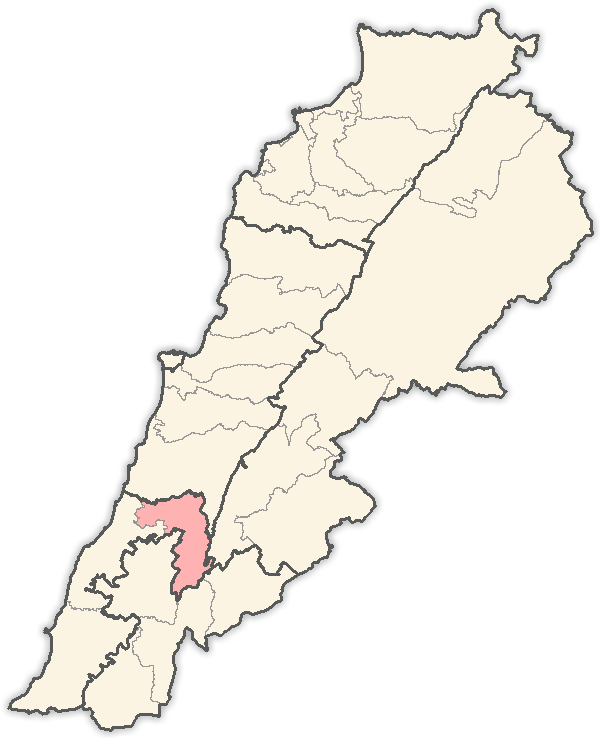
- Location in Lebanon
- Country: Lebanon
- Governorate: South Governorate
- Capital: Jezzine

Area
  - Total: 93 sq mi (241 km^{2})

Population
  - Estimate (31 December 2017): 31,575
- Time zone: UTC+2 (EET)
  - Summer (DST): UTC+3 (EEST)

The Jezzine District (Arabic: قضاء جزين) is a district in the South Governorate of Lebanon. The capital is Jezzine.

== Municipalities ==
The following 56 municipalities are all located in the Jezzine District:

- Al-Aaishiyah
- Aaramta
- Aaray
- Aazour
- Ain al-Mir
- Ain Majdalain
- Anan
- Baissour
- Barti
- Beba
- Benwati
- Bhannin
- Bisri
- Bkassine
- Bouslaiya
- Bteddine el-Loqch
- Choualiq
- Al-Ghabbatiyah
- Haitouli
- Haitoura
- Al-Harf
- Al-Hassaniye
- Al-Homsiye
- Aj-Jarmaq
- Jensnaya
- Jernaya
- Jezzine
- Karkha
- Kfar Falous
- Kfar Hounah
- Kfar Jarra
- Lebaa
- Al-Lwaiza
- Machmouche
- Al-Maharbiyah
- Al-Maknouniyah
- Marah al-Habas
- Mazraat al-Mathanah
- Al-Midan
- Al-Mjaidel
- Mlikh
- Qaitouli
- Qatali
- Al-Qatrani
- Qattin ou Hidab
- Raimat ou Shaqadif
- Ar-Rihan
- Roum
- Sabah
- Saidoun
- Sejoud
- Sfaray
- Snaya
- As-Srira
- Taaid
- Wadi Baanqoudain
- Wadi El Laymoun
- Wadi Jezzine
- Zhalta

== Demographics ==
According to registered voters in 2014:

Year	Christians				Muslims				Druze
Year	Total	Maronites	Greek Catholics	Other Christians	Total	Shias	Sunnis	Alawites	Druze
2014	75.87%	57.01%	14.68%	4.18%	22.77%	20.33%	2.43%	0.01%	0.96%
2018	75.62%	56.47%	14.52%	4.63%	23.41%	20.96%	2.44%	0.01%	0.98%
2022	75.12%	56.55%	14.37%	4.20%	23.96%	21.56%	2.40%	0.00%	0.92%
2026	75.21%	59.49%	14.47%	1.25%	23.95%	22.08%	1.87%	0.00%	0.84%

Number of registered voters (21+ years old) over the years.

Years	Men	Women	Total	Growth (%)
2009	27,785	26,403	54,188	—N/a
2010	28,090 ▲	26,648 ▲	54,738 ▲	+1.00% ▲
2011	28,343 ▲	26,888 ▲	55,231 ▲	+0.89% ▼
2012	28,598 ▲	27,160 ▲	55,758 ▲	+0.95% ▲
2013	29,033 ▲	27,481 ▲	56,514 ▲	+1.34% ▲
2014	29,295 ▲	27,766 ▲	57,061 ▲	+0.96% ▼
2015	29,554 ▲	28,037 ▲	57,591 ▲	+0.92% ▼
2016	29,859 ▲	28,490 ▲	58,349 ▲	+1.30% ▲
2017	30,275 ▲	28,887 ▲	59,162 ▲	+1.37% ▲
2018	30,616 ▲	29,159 ▲	59,775 ▲	+1.03% ▼
2019	30,804 ▲	29,340 ▲	60,144 ▲	+0.61% ▼
2020	31,089 ▲	29,623 ▲	60,712 ▲	+0.94% ▲
2021	31,357 ▲	29,823 ▲	61,180 ▲	+0.76% ▼
2022	31,826 ▲	30,294 ▲	62,120 ▲	+1.51% ▲
2023	31,757 ▼	30,261 ▼	62,018 ▼	-0.16% ▼
2024	32,031 ▲	30,499 ▲	62,530 ▲	+0.82% ▲
2025	32,380 ▲	30,806 ▲	63,186 ▲	+1.04% ▲
2026	—N/a	—N/a	63,199 ▲	+0.02% ▼
Source: DGCS

== Gallery ==
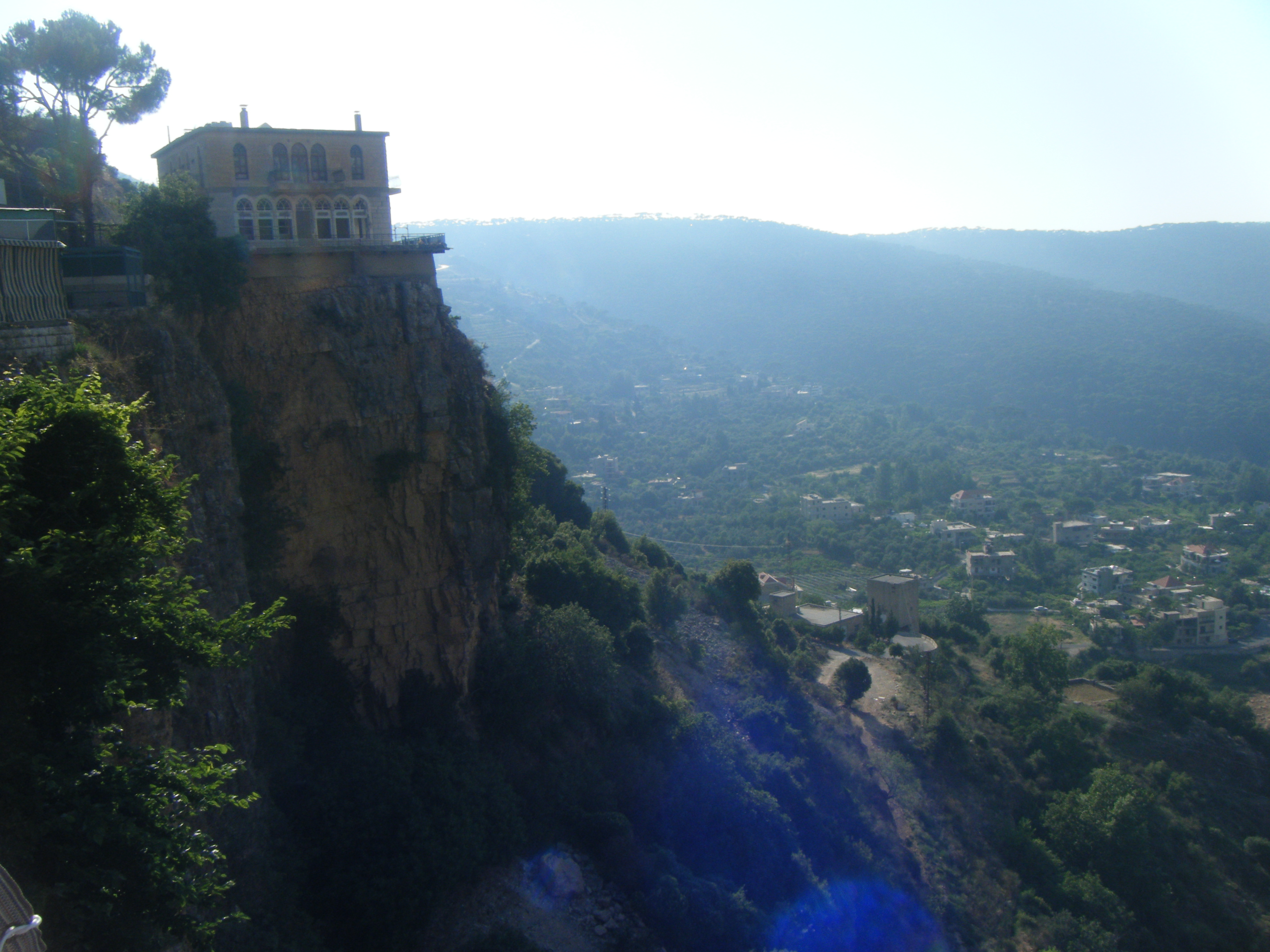

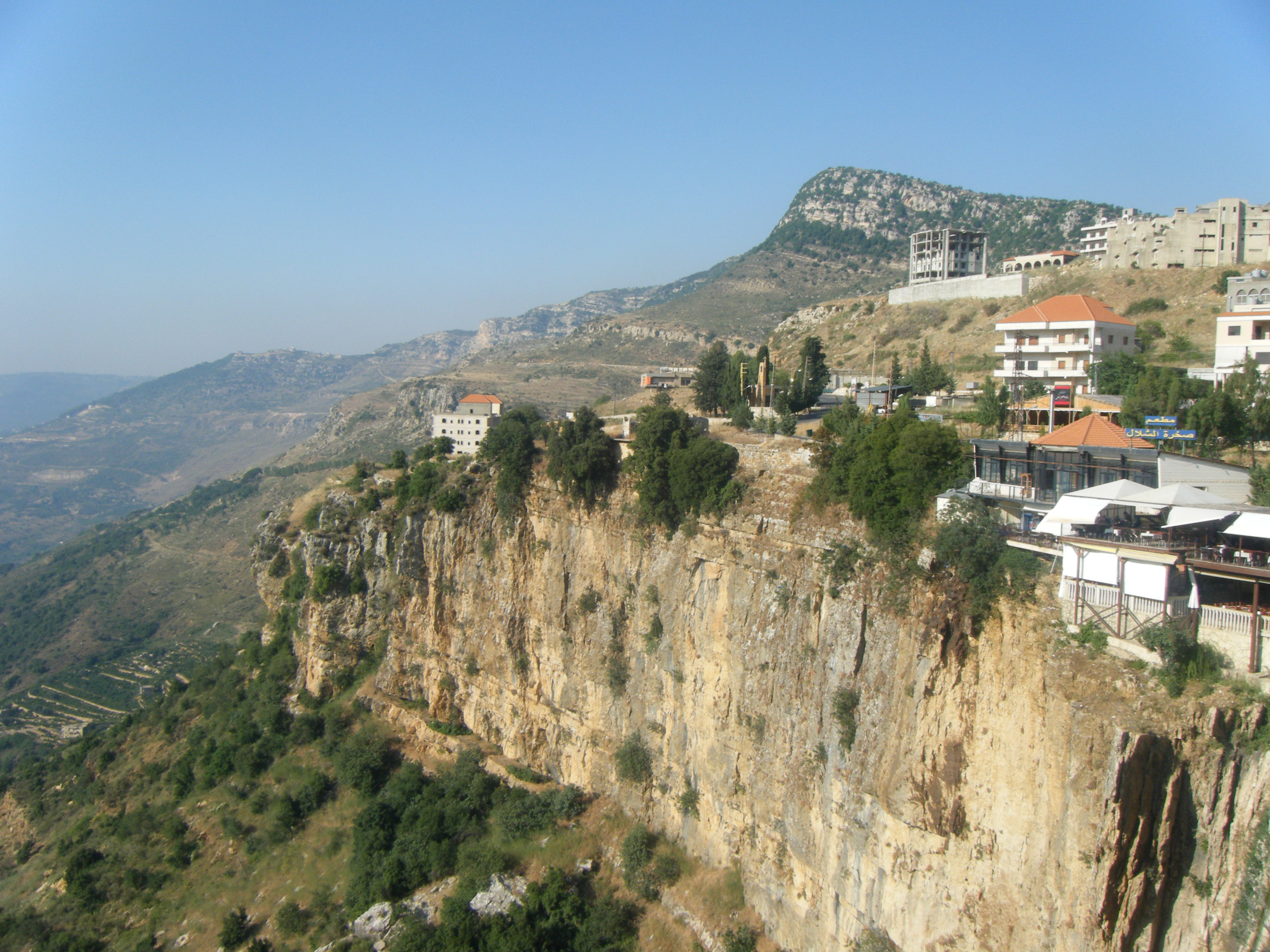

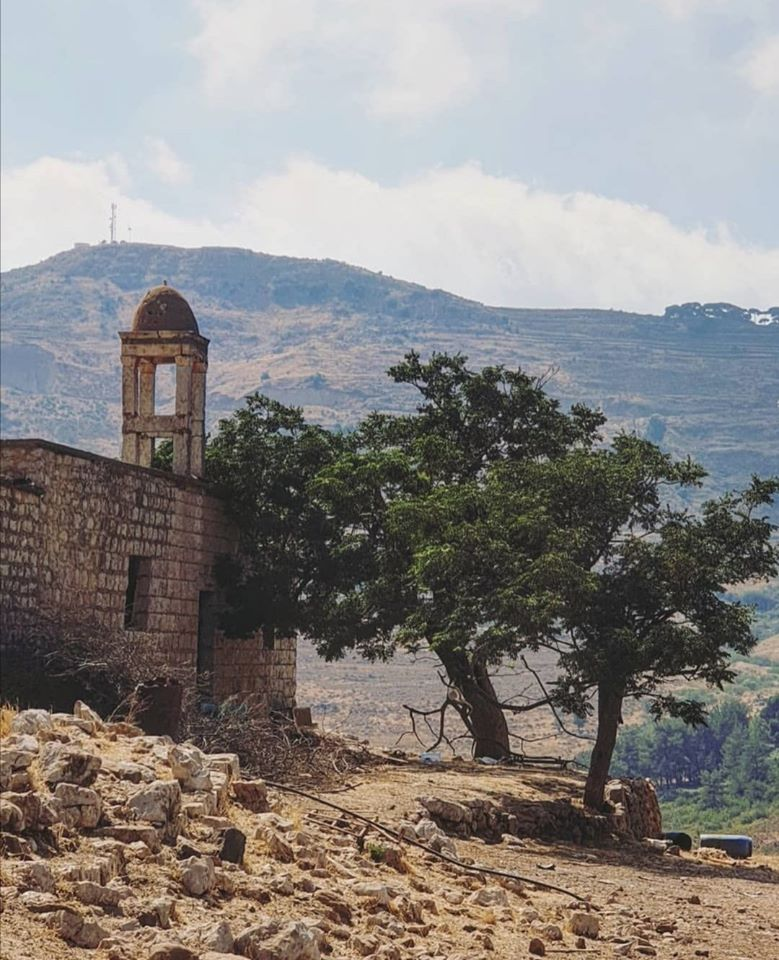

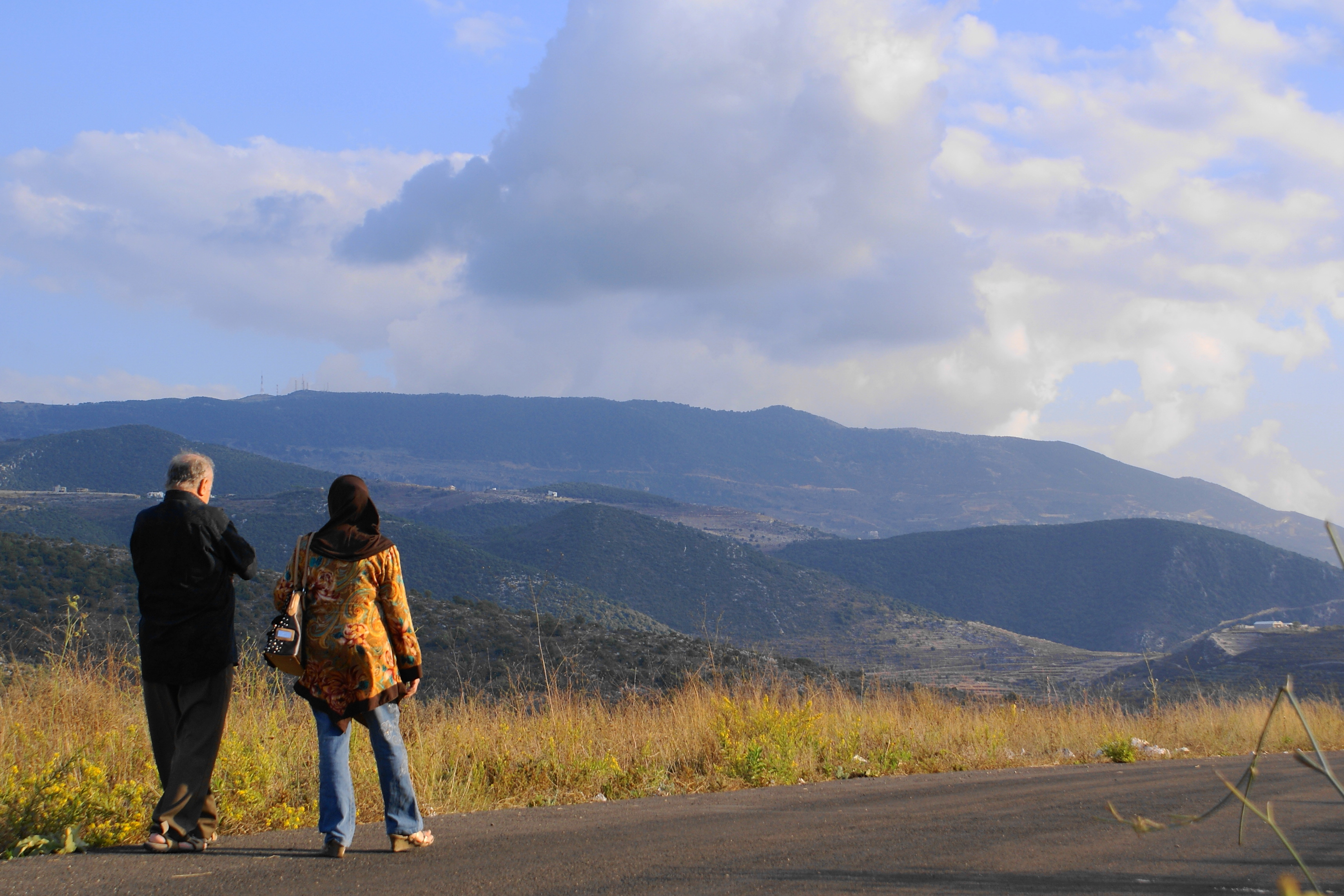

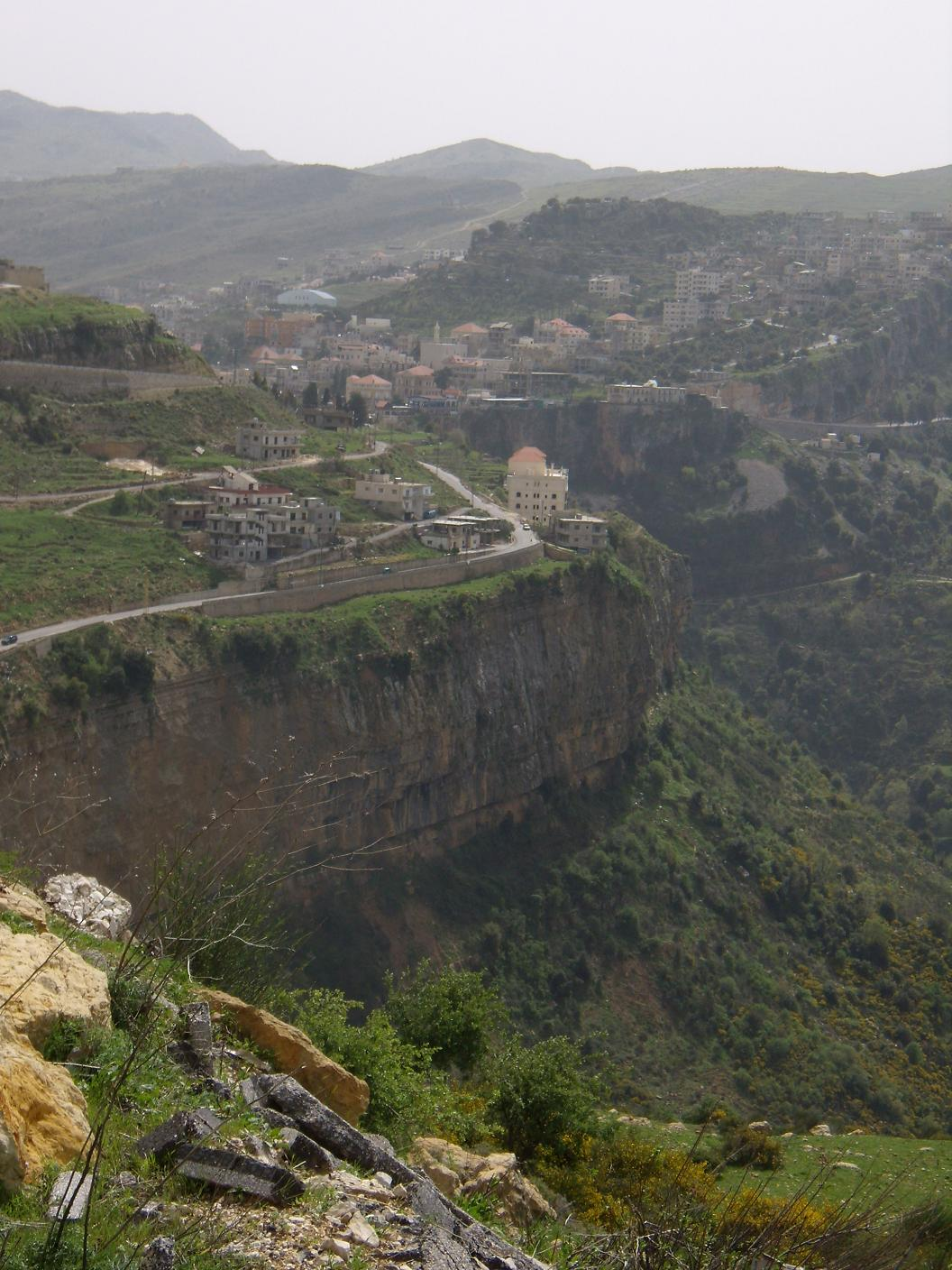

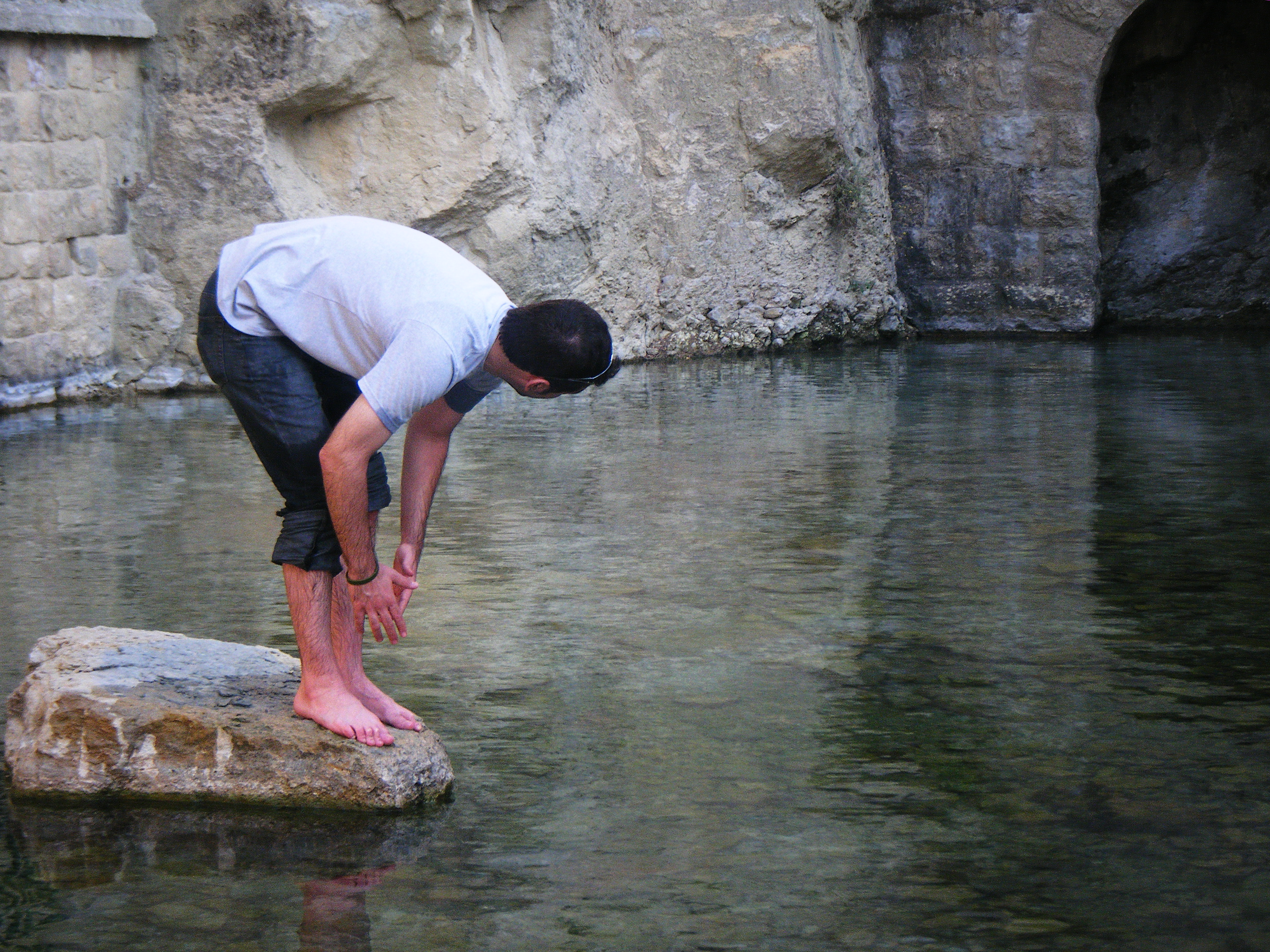

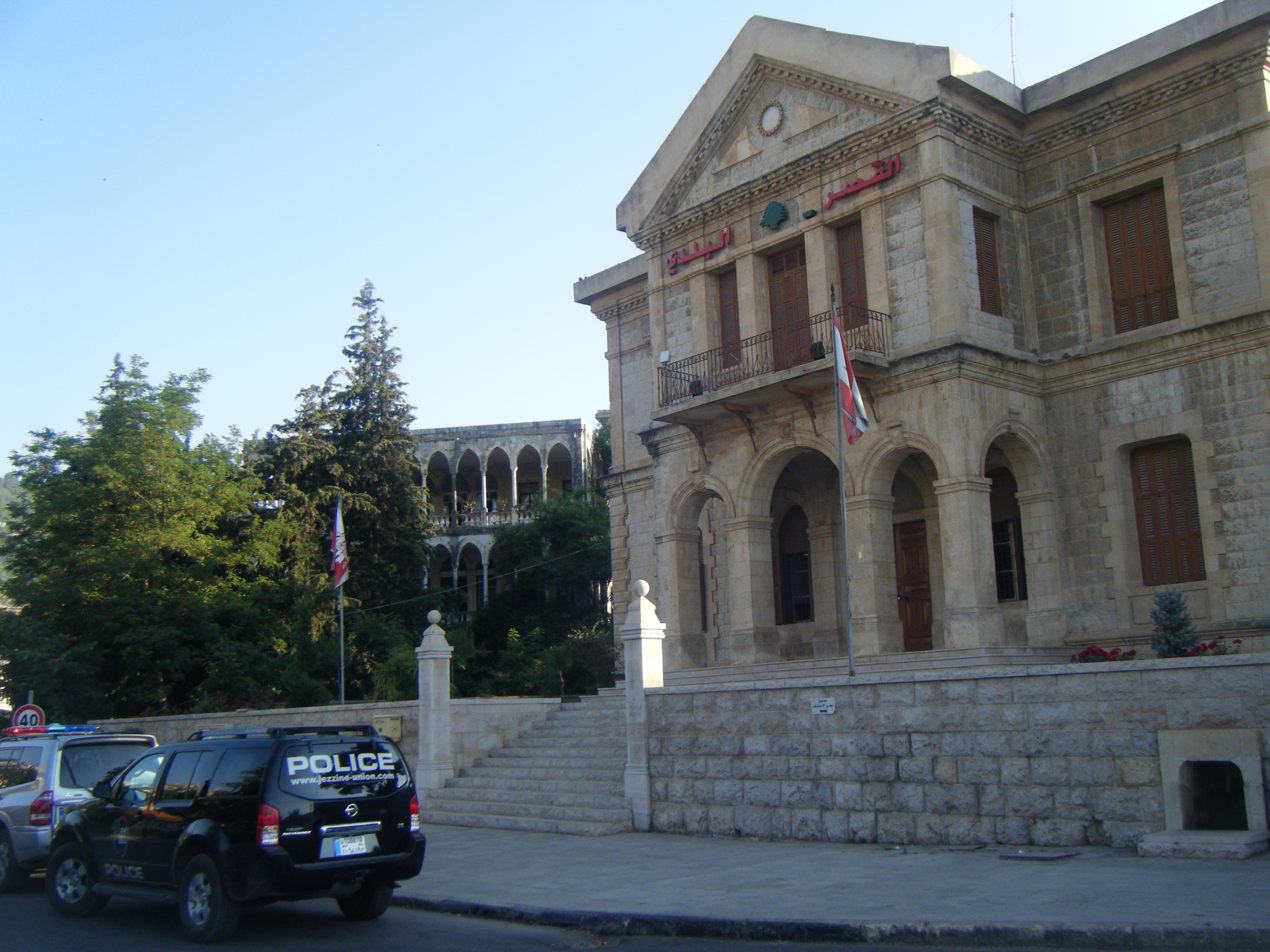

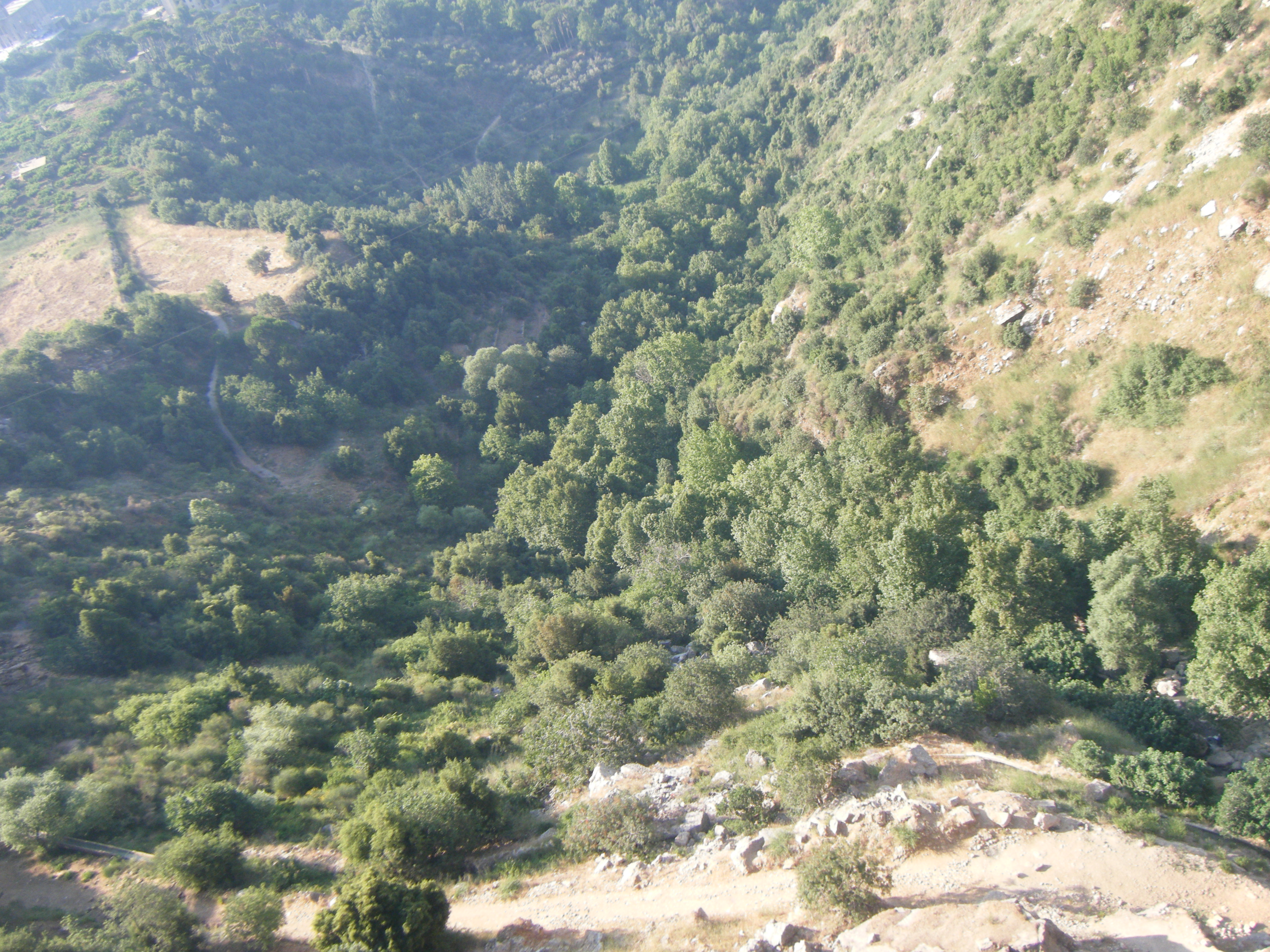
