= Lebanese Melkite Christians =

Adherents of the Melkite Greek Catholic Church in Lebanon

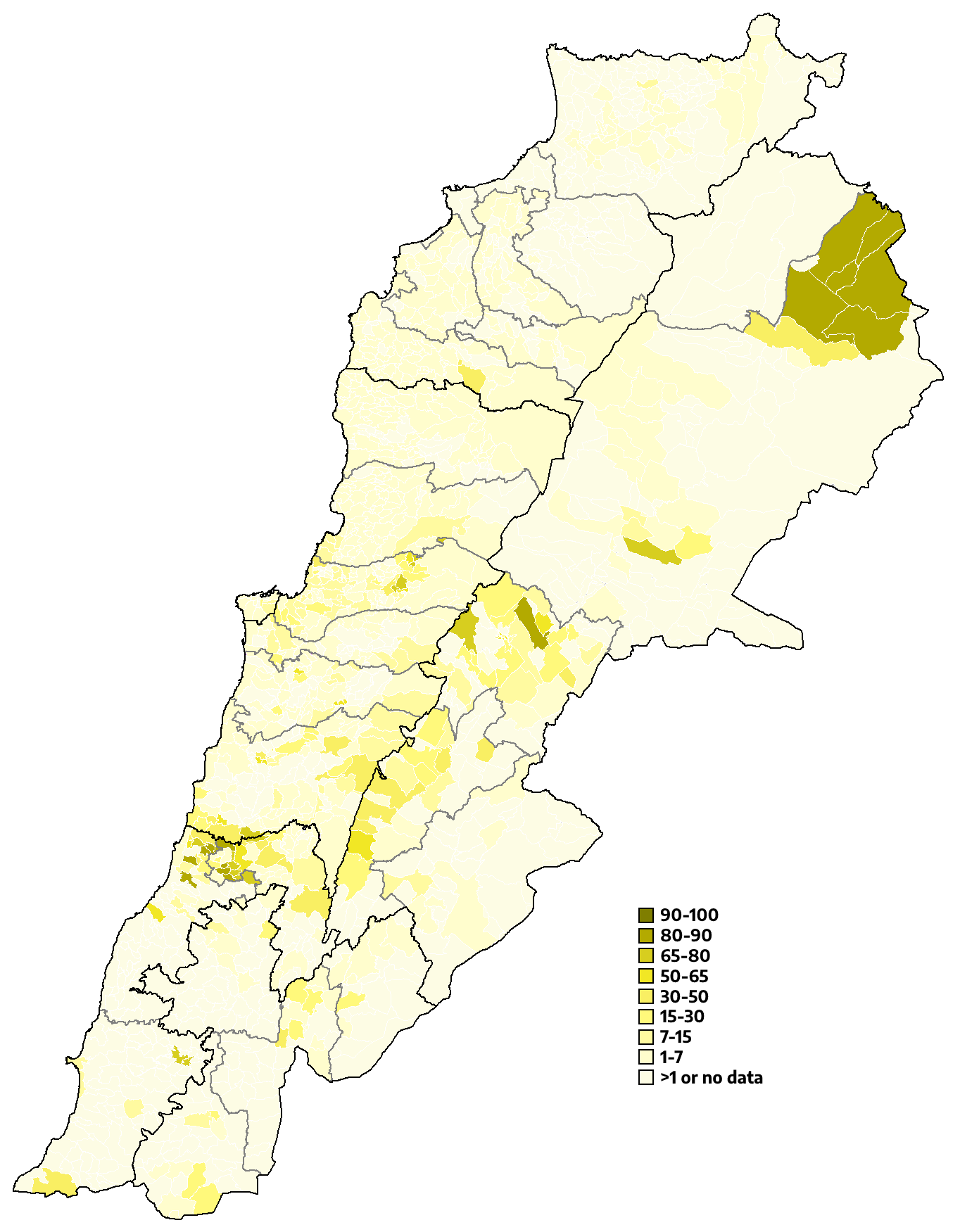
- Distribution of Melkite Catholic Christians in Lebanon

Languages
- Vernacular: Lebanese Arabic; Liturgical: Koine Greek and Arabic

Religion
- Christianity (Melkite Catholic)

Lebanese Melkite Christians refers to Lebanese people who are members of the Melkite Greek Catholic Church in Lebanon, which is the third largest Christian group in the country after the Maronite Church and the Greek Orthodox Church of Antioch.

The Lebanese Melkite Christians are believed to constitute about 5% of the total population of Lebanon. The following percentages are estimates only. However, in a country that had its last census in 1932, it is difficult to have correct population estimates.

Under the terms of an unwritten agreement known as the National Pact between the various political and religious leaders of Lebanon, the Melkite community in Lebanon has eight reserved seats in the Parliament of Lebanon.

== Notable Lebanese-born Melkites ==
- André Haddad
- Najwa Karam
- Shakira
- Marwan Fares
- Majida El Roumi
- John Elya
- Peter IV Geraigiry
- Saad Haddad
- Marie Keyrouz
- Wael Kfoury
- Amin Maalouf
- Henri Philippe Pharaoun
- Michel Pharaon
- Joseph Raya
- Omar Sharif
- Charbel Nahas
- Jean Makaron
- Nicolas Osta

== See also ==
- Christianity in Lebanon
- Catholicism in Lebanon
- Religion in Lebanon
- Lebanese Maronite Christians
- Lebanese Protestant Christians
- Lebanese Greek Orthodox Christians
- Lebanese Shia Muslims
- Lebanese Sunni Muslims
- Lebanese Druze
