= South Governorate =

Governorate of Lebanon

South Governorate محافظة الجنوب
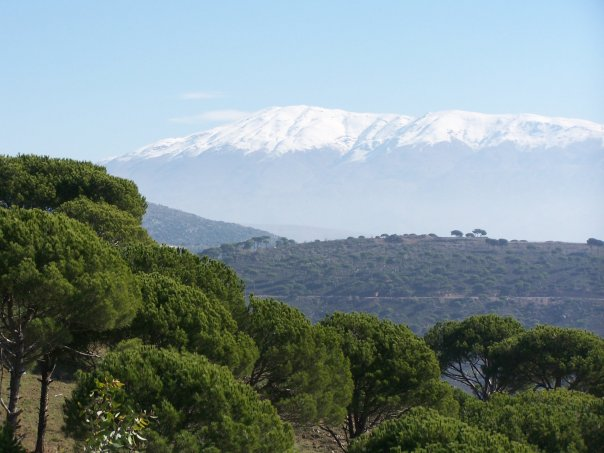
- Scenic view of Al Rihan

- Map of Lebanon with South highlighted
- Country: Lebanon
- Capital: Sidon

Government
  - Governor: Mansour Daou (Independent)

Area
  - Total: 929.6 km^{2} (358.9 sq mi)

Population (31 December 2017)
  - Total: 590,078
  - Density: 634.8/km^{2} (1,644/sq mi)
- Time zone: UTC+2 (EET)
  - Summer (DST): UTC+3 (EEST)
- ISO 3166 code: LB-JA

South Governorate (Arabic: محافظة الجنوب, romanized: muḥāfaẓat al-Janūb, or simply الجنوب) is one of the governorates of Lebanon, with a population of 590,000 inhabitants and an area of 929.6 km^{2}. The capital is Sidon. The lowest elevation is sea-level; the highest is 1,000 meters. The local population is religiously diverse and includes Shia and Sunni Muslims, Druze, Eastern Orthodox, Maronite, Protestant, and Greek Catholic Christians. Temperatures can drop to 4 °C during winter with much rain and snow on the higher ground. In the humid summer, temperatures can rise to 30 °C in the coastal areas. The governorate has several rivers: the Litani, Deir El Zahrani, Naqoura, Awali, Qasmiye, and Hasbani. The area is famous for its citrus and banana farms. Its main cities are Sidon, Tyre and Jezzine.

== Districts ==
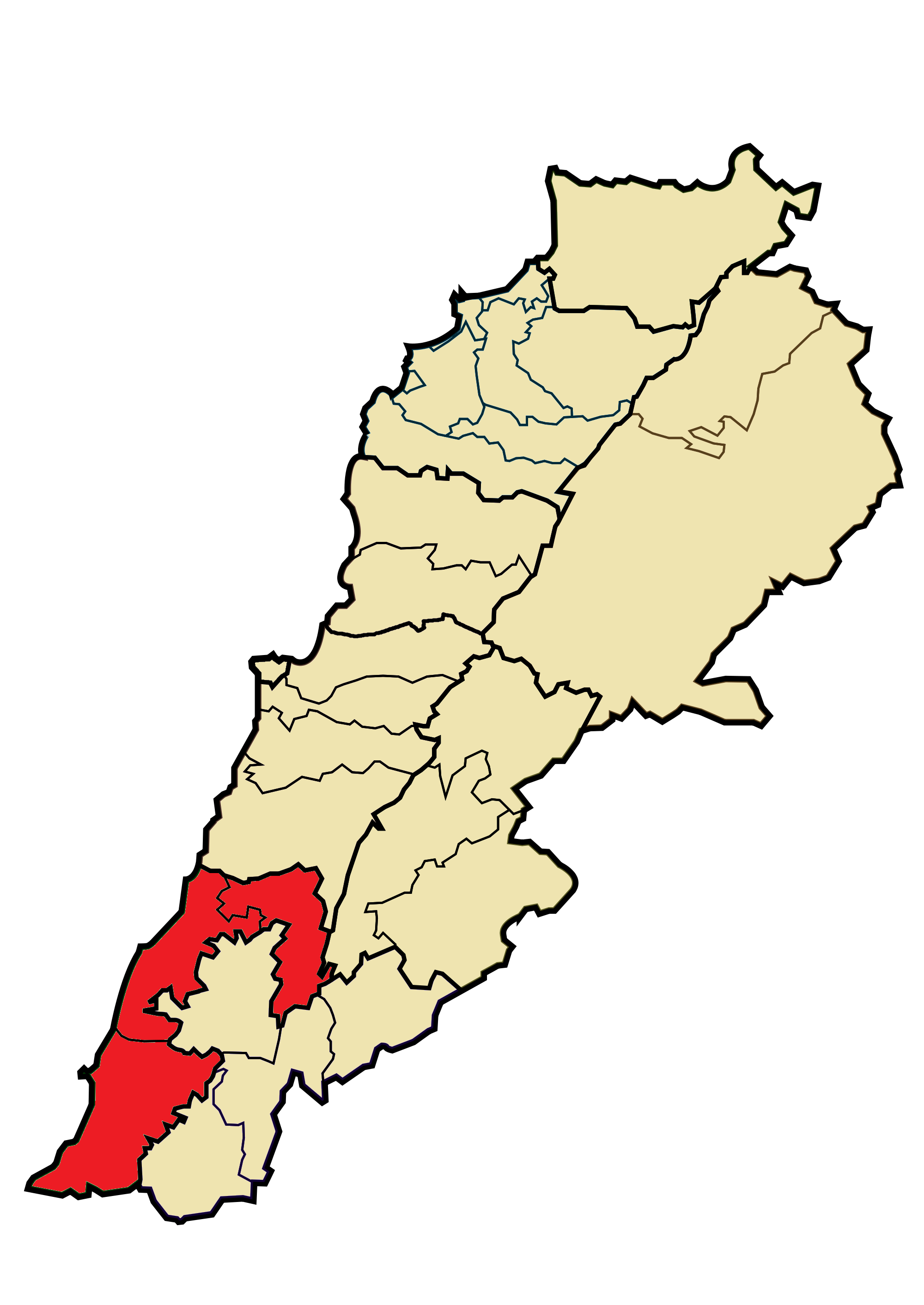
Districts of the South Governorate

The governorate is divided into three districts (Aqdiya, singular qadaa) containing 181 municipalities. The capitals are in brackets:

- Jezzine (Jezzine) – 56 municipalities
- Sidon (Sidon) – 53 municipalities
- Tyre (Tyre) – 72 municipalities

== Demographics ==
According to registered voters in 2014:

Religion in the South Governorate
1. Shia Islam (60.9%)
2. Sunni Islam (17.4%)
3. Christianity (21.1%)
4. Druze (0.16%)
5. Other (0.35%)

Year	Christians					Muslims				Druze
Year	Total	Maronites	Greek Catholics	Greek Orthodox	Other Christians	Total	Shias	Sunnis	Alawites	Druze
2014	21.15%	12.14%	7.04%	0.82%	1.15%	78.35%	60.93%	17.41%	0.01%	0.16%

Shias make up the majority of the governorate and are the main residents of the Zahrani Tyre districts. Sunnis are the main residents of Sidon the capital of the governorate and the third largest city in Lebanon after Beirut and Tripoli. Christians are mainly residents of the Jezzine district and form a small community in the cities of Tyre, which is the fourth-most-populous city in Lebanon.

== Cities, towns and villages ==
This list includes all cities, towns and villages with more than 6,000 registered voters in 2014:

English name	Population	District
Sidon	58,475	Sidon District
Tyre	29,410	Tyre District
Jwaya	10,935	Tyre District
Jezzine	8,276	Jezzine District
As-Sarafand	7,326	Sidon District
Al-Ghaziyah	7,221	Sidon District
Qana	7,107	Tyre District
Maarakah	6,124	Tyre District

== Local attractions and events ==
The area offers a great number of attractions, including pristine white sandy beaches south of Tyre, and the opportunity to snorkel or dive among submerged Phoenician and Roman ruins near the ancient cities of Sidon and Tyre. There are a number of Ottoman-era pazars and seafood restaurants overlooking the Mediterranean Sea. Southern Lebanon also hosts the Tyre festival, which attracts thousands of tourists each year.

== Districts ==
- Jezzine
- Sidon
- Tyre

== See also ==
- Southern Lebanon
