= List of massacres in Lebanon =

The following is a list of massacres that have occurred in Lebanon:

== Antiquity ==
Name	Date	Location	Deaths	Victims	Perpetrators	Notes
Siege of Tyre (332 BC)	332 BC	Tyre	2,000	Tyrians	Ancient Macedonian army	2,000 Tyrians crucified on the beach by Alexander the Great's army

== Medieval ==
Name	Date	Location	Deaths	Victims	Perpetrators	Notes
1283 Mamluk offensive against Mount Lebanon	May–August, 1283	Northern Mount Lebanon	Thousands	Maronites	Mamluk Sultanate	After decades of Maronite resistance against the Sultanate, Mamluk forces launched a massive siege on the northern strongholds. The campaign culminated in the fall of the mountain fortress of Hadat.This event led to the capture and execution of Patriarch Daniel of Hadshit, the leader of the resistance. It marked the end of Maronite political autonomy in the North for centuries and forced the population to seek refuge in the inaccessible heights of the Qadisha Valley.
1305 Kisrawan campaign	July, 1305	Kisrawan	Thousands	Shia; Alawites; Druze; Maronites	Mamluk Sultanate	Following several failed attempts to subdue the mountain, the Mamluk Sultanate launched a massive "scorched earth" expedition with 50,000 soldiers. The goal was to eliminate "heterodox" groups accused of aiding Crusader and Mongol interests.

== Ottoman Era ==
Name	Date	Location	Deaths	Victims	Perpetrators	Notes
1820 Lehfed massacre	1820	Lehfed	50–100 villagers	Maronites	Shihab dynasty	During the uprisings against the heavy taxation of Emir Bashir Shihab II, the Emir’s forces launched a brutal crackdown on the village of Lehfed, which had become a center of peasant resistance. It was a rare instance of "intra-sectarian" massacre, where a Christian ruler used violence against his own Maronite subjects to maintain his tax collection rights for the Ottoman Sultan.
1841 Deir al-Qamar massacre	October–November, 1841	Deir al-Qamar	1,000–1,500	Maronites	Druze militias	This was the first major explosion of sectarian violence in the modern era. After a dispute over hunting rights, Druze fighters besieged the town. Ottoman authorities remained neutral or actively assisted in the disarmament of Christians, who were then attacked. This event signaled the collapse of the "Double Qaimaqamate" (the administrative division of the mountain) and served as the direct psychological precursor to the much larger 1860 Civil War.
1845 sectarian conflict in Mount Lebanon and Beqaa Valley	May–June, 1845	Mount Lebanon; Beqaa Valley	Hundreds	Maronites	Druze militias	This was a period of systemic tit-for-tat killings that followed the failed 1841 partition. In the Bekaa, the town of Mallaqa was attacked, and Zahleh was besieged. The Ottoman military often intervened only after Christian villages were already disarmed and vulnerable. This conflict proved that the "Double Qaimaqamate" (the administrative division of Lebanon into two sectarian sectors) was a failure. It directly led to the total social breakdown that caused the 1860 Civil War.
1860 civil conflict in Mount Lebanon and Damascus	23 May–11 July, 1860	Mount Lebanon; Beqaa Valley; Beirut; Damascus	7,000–25,000	Christians	Druze militias; Muslim militias	During the 1860 Civil conflict in Mount Lebanon, large massacres of Christians at Deir al-Qamar, Hasbaya, and Rashaya took place. Many Christians fled to Damascus and Beirut, where Muslim militias with the support of rogue Ottoman troops massacred several thousand Christian civilians.
Execution of Arab nationalists	May 6, 1916	Beirut; Damascus	23	Arab Nationalists	Ottoman Empire	On May 6, 1916, Djemal Pasha publicly executed simultaneously seven Arabs in Damascus and fourteen in Beirut for alleged anti-Turkish activities. The date, May 6, is commemorated annually in both countries as Martyrs' Day, and the site in Beirut has come to be known as Martyrs' Square.

== French Lebanon ==
Name	Date	Location	Deaths	Victims	Perpetrators	Notes
Ain Ebel massacre	May 5, 1920	Ain Ebel	50–100	Maronites	Shia militia	Mahmoud Bazzi's militia, which "proceeded from brigandage to confronting France and its Christian friends in the south," attacked Ain Ebel on May 5, 1920, pillaging and killing more than 50 people. The people of Ain Ebel defended the town from sunrise to sunset until they ran out of ammunition. The town was completely destroyed, and the damage done to the two churches, school and convent, was evidence of sectarian malice.
Rashaya revolt massacre	November, 1925	Rashaya	Hundreds	Christians	Druze militia	The anti-French revolt's expansion into Lebanon and stories of massacres targeting local Christians sparked worry among the Christians of southern Lebanon. Around 400 Christian homes in Rashaya were either damaged or destroyed in the fighting.
Tripoli student massacre	November 13, 1943	Tripoli	14	Student protesters	French-Senegalese soldiers	The students were struck by French tanks driven by Senegalese soldiers while participating in a peaceful march through the streets. During the demonstration, the students were fervently advocating for an end to the occupation. All the victims were under the age of 15.

== Independent Lebanon ==
Name	Date	Location	Deaths	Victims	Perpetrators	Notes
Hula massacre	October 31, 1948	Hula	34–89	Lebanese	Israel Defense Forces	Hula, located in Lebanon, was captured on October 24 by the Carmeli Brigade of the Israel Defense Forces without any resistance. The women and children were expelled, most of the men aged between 15 and 60 were shot. In total between 35 and 58 men were executed in a house which was later blown up on top of them.
Miziara massacre	June 16, 1957	Miziara	30	Douaihy clan	Frangieh clan	Sleiman Frangieh and his followers killed 30 loyalist to the Douaihy family in a church in Miziara. Victims included nuns, priests, women and children.

== Civil War Period ==
Name	Date	Location	Deaths	Victims	Perpetrators	Notes
Church shooting	April 13, 1975	Ain El Remmaneh	4	Lebanese Christians	(Palestine Liberation Organization) PLO	Drive-by shooting assassination attempt on Pierre Gemayel outside a church ceremony. Gemayel survived but four men were killed.
Bus massacre	April 13, 1975	Ain El Remmaneh	27	Palestinians	Kataeb Regulatory Forces	On the morning of 13 April 1975, PLO gunmen in a speeding car fired on a church in the Christian East Beirut suburb of Ain el-Rummaneh, killing four people, including two Maronite Phalangists. Hours later, 27 Palestinian civilians traveling in a bus through one of the Ain el Rummaneh neighborhoods of Beirut were attacked and killed by Christian Phalangists. Many more people were killed in subsequent fighting in other areas of the city later that day. Together, these incidents have been identified by several historians as the starting point of the Lebanese Civil War.
Black Thursday	May 30, 1975	Beirut	30–50	Lebanese Christians	LNM; Knights of Ali; (Palestine) PLO; As-Sa'iqa	The bodies were abandoned in a Muslim cemetery, with possible intention of provoking a sectarian message, close to the Green Line separating East and West Beirut, all with their genitals mutilated off.
Beit Mellat massacre	September 10, 1975	Beit Mellat	30	Lebanese Christians	LNM; INM; (Palestine) PLO; As-Sa'iqa	On September 10, 1975, during the initial phase of the civil war, the village was attacked by joint forces of the LNM and the PLO, in what became known as the "Beit Mellat massacre", resulting in the death of approximately 30 Christian residents and the torching of several houses. This incident became known for being one of the first mass killings in a series of massacres targeting Christian residents during the civil war.
Black Saturday	December 6, 1975	Beirut	150–200	Lebanese Muslims; Lebanese Druze	Kataeb Regulatory Forces	Four young Christian Phalangists were assassinated on the Fanar (Matn) road in Beirut. In retaliation, Phalangists murdered hundreds of non-Christians. It is estimated that more than 300 civilians were murdered in what was the first ethnic cleansing of the Lebanese Civil War.
Karantina massacre	January 18, 1976	Beirut	600–1,500	Palestinians; Lebanese Muslims	Kataeb Regulatory Forces	Karantina was an impoverished predominantly Muslim district — housing Lebanese and Palestinian refugees, as well as others — in northeastern Beirut, and was overrun by the Lebanese Christian militias.
Damour massacre	January 20, 1976	Damour	150-582	Lebanese Christians	LNM; INM; SSNP-L; CAOL; LCP; (Palestine Liberation Organization) PLO; Fatah; As-Sa'iqa	Following the Jiyeh Massacre several days earlier where the Damour entry point had been strategically penetrated in preparation, PLO and LNM militia forces launched a brutal assault on the town of Damour. The operation, which aimed to "empty the city" of its estimated 35,000 residents, resulted in a humanitarian catastrophe. Militants systematically killed entire families—including women, children, and the elderly—within their homes and in places of refuge, such as the local church. Survivors and historical accounts document widespread atrocities, including gang rapes, looting, arson, and the desecration of cemeteries.
Chekka massacre	July 5, 1976	Chekka; Hamat	200	Lebanese Christians	LNM; INM; LCP; (Palestine) PLO; As-Sa'iqa	The attack was launched from Tripoli by Palestinian militants and members of a left-wing group called Jund Allah. The group stormed the Christian pro-SSNP-L settlement of Chekka as well as Hamat. An estimated 200 people were killed in the ensuing 24 hours. Residents tried to flee through a tunnel to Batroun but the attackers blocked the exit. Many were killed as their cars caught fire, and they suffocated to death.
Tel al-Zaatar massacre	August 12, 1976	Beirut	1,500–3,000	Palestinians	Kataeb Regulatory Forces	Christian Phalangists and other right-wing Christian militias besieged Tel Al-Zaatar; after heavy fighting, they massacred Palestinian civilian refugees who resided in the camp.
Aishiyeh massacre	October 19–21, 1976	Aishiyeh	70+	Lebanese Christians	LNM; SSNP-L; LCP; CAOL; (Palestine Liberation Organization) PLO; Fatah; As-Sa'iqa	The Lebanese National Movement (LNM) and Palestinian militias Fatah and As-Sa'iqa captured the Christian village of Aychiye in South Lebanon. The assault resulted in a massacre of the civilian population, with documented fatalities estimated at over 70 individuals, including women and children, and over 100 injured.
Chouf massacres	March 16–30, 1977	Chouf District	177–250	Lebanese Christians	PLA	Between March 16 and March 30, 1977 a series of massacres on Christian civilians took place in the Chouf District; the massacres were mostly committed by Druze gunmen of the People's Liberation Army after the assassination of Druze leader Kamal Jumblatt.
St George's Church attack	August 21, 1977	Brih	13	Lebanese Christians	PLA	Druze leftist gunmen attacked St George's Church during prayers on Sunday with automatic gunfire inside and around the church killing 13 people.
Ehden massacre	June 13, 1978	Ehden	40	Marada Movement	Kataeb Regulatory Forces	It was an inter-Christian attack that occurred between the Maronite clans. Following the kidnapping and assassination of Jude al-Bayeh, a Kataeb leader in Zgharta by members of Marada, a Phalangist squad attacked the mansion of Frangieh family in an attempt to capture Ehden, killing nearly 40 people including Tony Frangieh, his spouse and his three-year-old daughter, Jihane. After the retaliatory massacre, the power of the Frangiehs is reported to have declined.
Qaa massacre	June 28, 1978	Qaa	26	Kataeb Party	Marada Brigade	Said to be revenge after the death of Marada leader Tony Frangieh in the Ehden massacre.
Safra massacre	July 7, 1980	Safra	83	NLP	Kataeb Regulatory Forces	The Phalangist forces launched a surprise attack on the Tigers Militia, that was the armed wing of the National Liberal Party of former Lebanese President Camille Chamoun, as part of Bashir Gemayel's effort to consolidate all the Christians fighters under his leadership in the Lebanese Forces by eliminating rival militias.
Sabra and Shatila massacre	September 16, 1982	West Beirut	1,300–3,500	Palestinians; Lebanese Muslims	Lebanese Forces	Sabra and Shatila were Palestinian refugee camps housing both Sunni and Christian Palestinian refugees, as well as some poor Lebanese Muslims. The Phalanges attacked the camp in retaliation for the assassination of President Bachir Gemayel.
Kfarmatta massacre	September 5, 1983	Kfarmatta	117	Lebanese Druze	Lebanese Forces	Occurred during the height of the Mountain War. Druze civilian residents were executed following the Lebanese Forces takeover of the town.
Southern Mount Lebanon massacres during the "Mountain War"	September–December, 1984	Southern Mount Lebanon	1,500–3,500	Lebanese Christians	PLA	Druze forces massacred hundreds of Christian civilians, ethnically cleansing the Southern Mount Lebanon region from Christian presence.
1983 Beirut barracks bombing	October 23, 1983	Beirut	307	MNF	Islamic Jihad Organization	Victims were mostly American Marines.
1984 Sohmor massacre	September 20, 1984	Sohmor	13	Lebanese Muslims	South Lebanon Army	Previously, 4 SLA militiamen were killed in an ambush near Sohmor. While the IDF encircled the village, the SLA gathered 300 men, aged 16 to 39 years, in the main square to investigate the recent ambush. Once there, the SLA militiamen began to shoot at the villagers and throw grenades at them, while screaming "this is for what you did to the patrol last night".
Shelling of Palestinian refugee camps during the "War of the Camps"	May, 1985	West Beirut	3,781	Palestinians	Amal Movement	Shatila and Bourj el-Barajneh Palestinian refugee camps were besieged and shelled by the Shia Amal Movement.
Dahr al-Wahsh massacre	October 13, 1990	Dahr al-Wahsh	240	Lebanese	Syrian Arab Army	Also known as the "October 13 massacre", occurred in the Lebanese village of Dahr al-Wahsh during the final phase of the civil war, in October 13, 1990, when the Syrian Arab Army executed as many as 240 Lebanese Army POW's and civilians loyal to General Michel Aoun, during the period of the "War of Liberation".

== Post Civil War ==
Name	Date	Location	Deaths	Victims	Perpetrators	Notes
Mansouri attack	April 13, 1996	Mansouri	6	Lebanese	Israel Defense Forces	
Nabatieh Fawka attack	April 16, 1996	Nabatieh Fawka	9	Lebanese	Israel Defense Forces	
First Qana Massacre	April 18, 1996	Qana	106	Lebanese	Israel Defense Forces	The Israel Defense Forces fired artillery shells at a United Nations compound, which had given refuge to 800 Lebanese civilians. 116 injured in addition to 106 deaths.
Second Qana Massacre	July 30, 2006	Qana	28	Lebanese	Israeli Air Force	
Marjayoun Convoy Incident	August 11, 2006	Kefraya	7	Lebanese Red Cross	Israeli Air Force	The IDF bombed a 359 vehicles convoy which was granted right of safe passage from the IDF, mediated through the UNIFIL. A reporter confirmed that the Red cross and Civil defense coming to aid the convoy were also bombed, which resulted in the death of a Red Cross volunteer
2023 Ainata airstrike	November 5, 2023	Ainata	4	Lebanese	Israeli Air Force	Three children and their grandmother were killed by an Israeli air attack in Ainata, south Lebanon.
August 2024 Nabatieh attack	August 17, 2024	Nabatieh	11+	Syrians	Israeli Air Force	
2024 Lebanon electronic device attacks	September 17–18, 2024	Cities across Lebanon	42	Lebanese	Israel Defense Forces	
2024 Beirut medical center airstrike	October 4, 2024	Beirut	9+	Lebanese	Israeli Air Force	
2024 Derdghaya Melkite Church airstrike	October 9, 2024	Derdghaya	8+	Lebanese	Israeli Air Force	
October 2024 Bachoura airstrike	October 10, 2024	Beirut	22+	Lebanese	Israeli Air Force	
October 2024 Aitou airstrike	October 14, 2024	Aitou	23	Lebanese	Israeli Air Force	8+ injured; victims include 12 women and 2 children
Attack on Nabatieh municipal council	October 16, 2024	Nabatieh	16+	Lebanese	Israeli Air Force	Israel conducted ten airstrikes on the municipal headquarters in Nabatieh, while municipal staff were having a meeting inside and co-ordinating aid for civilians remaining in the town. The airstrike killed at least 16 municipality staff, including the mayor of Nabatieh, Ahmad Kahil, and injured at least 52 others.
2024 Beqaa Valley airstrikes	October 28, 2024	Beqaa Valley	60+	Lebanese	Israeli Air Force	117+ Injured
2024 Barja attack	November 7, 2024	Barja	30+	Lebanese	Israeli Air Force	The strike targeted a residential building housing displaced people killing over 30 and injuring 14 others.
2024 Akkar airstrike	November 11, 2024	Ain Yaaqoub	15+	Lebanese; Syrians	Israeli Air Force	
Basta airstrikes	November 23, 2024	Beirut	29+	Lebanese	Israeli Air Force	
January 2025 southern Lebanon attack	January 26–27, 2025	Kfar Kila	26	Lebanese	Israel Defense Forces	Israeli troops opened fire on displaced Lebanese civilians returning to villages in the south. At least 25 of those killed were civilians.
2025 Bint Jbeil drone strike	September 21, 2025	Bint Jbeil	5	Lebanese	Israeli Air Force	
2025 Sidon airstrike	November 18, 2025	Ain al-Hilweh refugee camp	13	Palestinians	Israeli Air Force	
November 2025 Israeli attack in Beirut	November 23, 2025	Beirut	5	Lebanese	Israeli Air Force	28 others were injured by the attack.
8 April 2026 Israeli attacks on Lebanon	April 8, 2026	Beirut and other cities across Lebanon	357	Lebanese	Israeli Air Force	Also known as "Black Wednesday" in Lebanon.

== See also ==
- List of attacks in Lebanon
- List of assassinations in Lebanon
- List of extrajudicial killings and political violence in Lebanon
- Terrorism in Lebanon
