= Karantina massacre =

Massacre during the Lebanese Civil War

- Part of the Lebanese Civil War
- Palestinian refugees Zuhaiba Alshaheen, Mohammed Amcha and grandchildren Ahmad Jawhar and Ahmad Kinj, with Zuhaiba seen confronting a Phalangist militant, in Karantina, 1976 (photo taken by Françoise Demulder)
- Location: 33°53′13″N 35°30′47″E; Beirut, Lebanon
- Date: 18 January 1976
- Target: Karantina district of Beirut
- Attack type: Massacre
- Deaths: 600–1,500
- Victims: Palestinians, Kurds, Syrians, Lebanese Muslims
- Perpetrators: Lebanese Front; Kataeb Regulatory Forces; Tigers Militia; Guardians of the Cedars; Al-Tanzim; Lebanese Youth Movement; Tyous Team of Commandos
- Motive: Reprisal for Black Thursday & Beit Mellat massacres; and the siege of the Christian towns of Damour and Jieh.

The Karantina massacre (Arabic: مجزرة الكرنتينا; French: Massacre de La Quarantaine/Karantina) took place on 18 January 1976, early in the Lebanese Civil War. La Quarantine, known in Arabic as "Karantina", was a Muslim-inhabited district in mostly Christian East Beirut controlled by forces of the Palestine Liberation Organization (PLO) and the Lebanese National Movement (LNM), and inhabited by Palestinians, Kurds, Armenians, Syrians, and Lebanese Muslims. The fighting and subsequent killings also involved an old Quarantine area near the port and nearby "Maslakh" quarter.

Karantina was overrun by militias of the right-wing and mostly Christian Lebanese Front, primarily the Kataeb Regulatory Forces (KRF) militia of the Kataeb Party (a.k.a. Phalangists), resulting in the deaths of approximately 600–1,500 people. According to then-Washington Post-correspondent Jonathan Randal: "Many Muslim men and boys were rounded up and separated from the women and children and massacred; while many of the women and young girls were violently raped and murdered."

Before the Karantina massacre, on January 9, 1976, the LNM and the PLO laid siege to the Christian towns of Jieh and Damour, cutting off access to water, food, and medical aid. Mass killings of civilians continued in Damour leading to the Damour massacre, which the LNM and the PLO perpetrated after the Karantina massacre.

After the Lebanese Front militias took control of the Karantina district, the Tel al-Zaatar refugee camp was besieged for five months, ending in the Tel al-Zaatar massacre.

== See also ==
- List of massacres in Lebanon
- Damour massacre
- Tel al-Zaatar massacre
- Chekka massacre
- Sabra and Shatila massacre
- Palestinian refugees in Lebanon
- List of extrajudicial killings and political violence in Lebanon

== Sources ==
- Chomsky, Noam (1989) Necessary Illusions: Thought Control in Democratic Societies South End Press, ISBN 0-89608-366-7
- Fisk, Robert (2001) Pity the Nation: Lebanon at War Oxford University Press, ISBN 0-19-280130-9,
- William Harris, (1996) Faces of Lebanon. Sects, Wars, and Global Extensions Markus Wiener Publishers, Princeton, US ISBN 1-55876-115-2
