= Beirut attack =

Beirut attack may refer to:

- 1975–1976 Battle of the Hotels
- 1978 Hundred Days' War
- 1981 Iraqi embassy bombing in Beirut
- Bombing of Lebanon (July 1981), including Bombing of Beirut
- 1982 Siege of Beirut
- 1982 Beirut bombing
- 1982 Sabra and Shatila massacre
- 1983 Beirut barracks bombings
- 1983 United States embassy bombing in Beirut
- 1984 United States embassy annex bombing in Beirut
- 1985 Beirut car bombings
- War of Liberation (1989–1990) including War in East Beirut
- 2005 Assassination of Rafic Hariri
- 2006 Chyah airstrike
- 2007 Beirut Arab University shooting
- October 2012 Beirut bombing
- 2013 Iranian embassy bombing in Beirut
- August 2013 Beirut bombing
- 2015 Beirut bombings
- 2019 Beirut drone crash
- 2020 Beirut explosion
- 2021 Beirut clashes
- 2024 Haret Hreik airstrike

== See also ==
- List of attacks in Lebanon
- Beirut bombings (disambiguation)
