= 2013 Beirut bombing =

2013 Beirut bombing may refer to:

- July 2013 Beirut bombing
- August 2013 Beirut bombing
- Iranian embassy bombing in Beirut, in November
- Assassination of Mohamad Chatah, in December
