= Beirut bombings =

Beirut bombings may refer to the following bombings that have occurred in Beirut:

- 1981 Iraqi embassy bombing in Beirut
- 1982 Beirut bombing
- 1983 United States embassy bombing in Beirut
- 1983 Beirut barracks bombing
- 1984 United States embassy annex bombing in Beirut
- 1985 Beirut car bombings
- October 2012 Beirut bombing
- July 2013 Beirut bombing
- August 2013 Beirut bombing
- 2013 Iranian embassy bombing in Beirut
- Assassination of Mohamad Chatah
- 2015 Beirut bombings
- Assassination of Saleh al Arouri

== See also ==
- Beirut attack (disambiguation)
- Beirut explosion
- Beirut (film)
- Beirut Memorial
- Lebanon bombings and assassinations (2004–present)
- List of major terrorist incidents
