= Chekka massacre =

1976 massacre committed by Palestinian militants

- Part of the Lebanese Civil War
- Location: Chekka and Hamat, Lebanon
- Date: July 5, 1976
- Target: Lebanese Christians
- Deaths: ~200
- Perpetrators: Palestine Liberation Organization (Lebanon) Lebanese National Movement
- Motive: Takeover of Christian regions

The Chekka Massacre (Arabic: مجزرة شكا) occurred on July 5, 1976, when Palestinian and Lebanese National Movement fighters killed approximately 200 people in the Christian towns of Chekka and Hamat during the Lebanese Civil War.

The attack was launched from Tripoli by Palestinian militants and members of an Islamist group Jund Allah. The group stormed the Syrian Social Nationalist Party strongholds in Chekka and Hamat. An estimated 200 people were killed in the ensuing 24 hours. Palestinians and LNM fighters destroyed and looted houses as they stabbed residents to death with knives and bayonets. Residents tried to flee through a tunnel to Batroun but the attackers blocked the exit. Many were killed as their cars caught fire, and they suffocated to death.

Around 600 civilians were killed. 4,200 people were living in the town at the time, meaning that approximately over 4% of Chekka's population at the time. Chekka and Hamat were later recaptured by right-wing Christian paramilitaries with the help of the Lebanese army, along with several other towns that had been taken during the LNM's offensive. A book depicting the event 'شكا قضية بحد ذاتها' was written by Georges Sarkis, a local politician.

== See also ==
- Damour massacre
- Aishiyeh massacre
- Black Thursday (Lebanon)
- Qaa massacre
