= 1983 Beirut bombing =

1983 Beirut bombing may refer to:

- 1983 United States embassy bombing
- 1983 Beirut barracks bombings

== See also ==
- Beirut bombings (disambiguation)
