= Knights of Ali =

Lebanese Shia militia active during the Lebanese Civil War

Knights of Ali فرسان علي
- Green flag used by the "Knights of Ali" (Note: The "Knights of Ali" chose the green flag as their symbol, which was the emblem of the Shiite followers of Imam Ali - the son-in-law of the Prophet.)
- Leaders: Salaheddine Khalil; Ahmad Safwan
- Dates active: 1967–1976
- Headquarters: Naba'a (Beirut)
- Active regions: West Beirut; Southern Lebanon; Bekaa Valley
- Ideology: Anti-Imperialism; Shia Interests
- Status: Disbanded
- Size: 1,000 fighters
- Part of: Lebanese National Movement
- Wars: Lebanese Civil War (1975–1990)

The 'Knights of Ali' (Arabic: فرسان علي | Fursan Ali), also known as the 'Youth of Ali', were a small Shia political movement and militia that used to operate at West Beirut, being a member of the Lebanese National Movement (LNM) during the 1975–77 phase of the Lebanese Civil War.

== History ==
The group was first established in 1967 by Salaheddine Khalil at the southern Lebanese port city of Tyre, but was temporarily disbanded in 1973. That same year, Khalil was replaced by Ahmad Safwan who reestablished the movement, which operated mainly in the Shia-majority neighborhood of Naba'a in Beirut.

=== Lebanese Civil War, 1975–1976 ===
When the civil war began in April 1975, the movement, now based in Naba'a, transformed itself into a 400-strong militia to counter the right-wing Christian Lebanese Front militias, and took part in the fighting at Sin el Fil and Sad el-Bauchrieh.

According to journalist Robert Fisk, some Christians allegedly accused the 'Knights of Ali' of the Black Thursday massacre, where more than 50 Christians were massacred in retaliation for the murder of a Palestinian man in West Beirut and mutilated, whose severed genitalia were placed in their mouths and whose bodies were dumped in a Muslim cemetery at the mainly Muslim Beirut district of Bashoura, close to the Green Line separating East and West Beirut. The 'Knights of Ali' claimed to stand for the Shi'ite Movement of the Deprived which was headed by Imam Musa al-Sadr, but he was quick to dissociate his Movement from this atrocity.

The 'Knights of Ali' became void after the fall of Naba'a on 6 August 1976, and they were disbanded later that year by Ahmad Safwan after being subjected to an assassination attempt by the Druze "People's Liberation Army" militia of the Progressive Socialist Party.

== See also ==
- Black Thursday (Lebanon)
- Lebanese Shia Muslims
- Lebanese Civil War
- Lebanese National Movement
- Lebanese Front
- List of armed groups in the Lebanese Civil War
- List of weapons of the Lebanese Civil War
