= Amos Yaron =

Israel Defence Forces Major General (born 1940)

- עמוס ירון
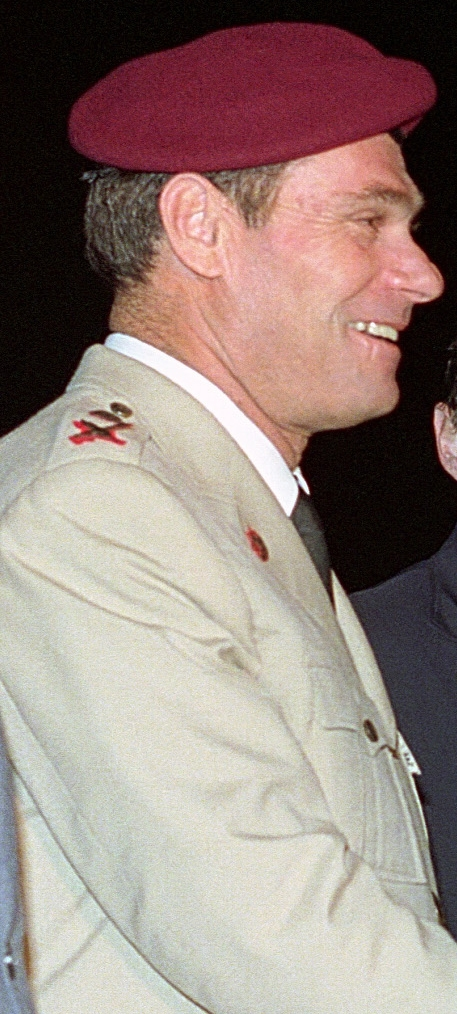
- Yaron in 1986
- Born: 1 April 1940 (age 86); Holon, Mandatory Palestine
- Military career
- Allegiance: Israel
- Branch: Israel Defense Forces
- Service years: 1957-1990
- Rank: Aluf
- Commands: Airborne Battalion; Commander of the Paratroopers Brigade; Division 720 (Judea Division); Head of Operations Directorate; Commander of 96th Division; Manpower Directorate, 1983–1985; Military attache to the United States and Canada; 7th Brigade; Armored Corp; Director-General of the Ministry of Defense
- Conflicts: Six-Day War; 1982 Lebanon War
- Other work: Director General of the Ministry of Defense

Amos Yaron (Hebrew: עמוס ירון; born 1 April 1940) is a retired Israel Defense Forces Major General and former head of the Manpower Directorate. He served as the Director General of the Ministry of Defense from 1999 until 2005.

== Biography ==
=== Military service ===
Yaron joined Nahal in 1957. He volunteered for the Airborne Battalion where he underwent training course as a fighter. In 1959. He later completed the infantry commanders' course after which he served as an instructor at the school for officers. He later served in several command positions in the Paratroopers Brigade, attending a Special forces training camp.

During the Six-Day War he served as the operations officer of the reserve 55th Paratroop Brigade that fought in Jerusalem. From 1970 to 1973 Yaron served as the commander of the Nahal Airborne Battalion, later served as deputy commander of the Paratroopers Brigade. In January 1971 commanded one of the forces that raided Lebanon during Operation Bardas 20, Operation Bardas 54–55, and Operation Spring of Youth.

==== Operation Pontiac ====
During the Yom Kippur War, on October 11, 1973, Yaron commanded Operation Pontiac. Sikorsky CH-53 Sea Stallion Yas'ur helicopters led a force of 22 soldiers, including artillery guns equipped with two M-102, and reserve personnel from Sayeret Matkal that secured the guns. They intercepted at Jebel Ataqah, Egypt where they confronted the Third Army headquarters, a crucial junction in the 101-mile axis.

==== 1970s and 1980s ====
In 1975 Yaron was promoted to commander of the Paratroopers Brigade in reserve and later to the regular Paratroopers Brigade. During his command, the Brigade suffered the IDF's biggest accident when a Yas'ur helicopter crashed during an exercise in the Jordan Valley, killing all 44 fighters and 10 crew members.

Between 1978 and 1980 Yaron established Division 720 (also known as the Judea Division), a reserve division that operated from 1978 and 2004. Between 1980 and 1981 Head of Operations Directorate. In 1981 he was appointed to Chief officer of infantry and paratroopers. At the same time he also served as the commander of the Fire Formation.

During the 1982 Lebanon War, Yaron commanded the division landing at the mouth of the Awali River which fought all the way to Beirut. That happened at the same time the Sabra and Shatila massacre took place. As the result of the Kahan Commission, Yaron was moved from all operational roles. Additionally Yaron was placed on a promotion freeze for three years.

From 1983 to 1986 Yaron served as the Head of Manpower Directorate. After his promotion was delayed for a while (due to the Kahan Commission's report), in 1984 Yaron was promoted to Major General. In 1986 Yaron was appointed military attache to the United States and Canada, a position he held until 1989.

Yaron was discharged in 1990, after 33 years of service.

=== Later years ===
Shortly before his discharge, Dan Shomron, Chief of Staff of the Israel Defense Forces at the time, appointed Yaron to head the Commission of Inquiry to review the circumstances that led to the First Tze'elim disaster that took place on July 17, 1990.

In 2006, Yaron was appointed to head the Commission of Inquiry into the circumstances of the escape of serial rapist Benny Sela.

In 1999 Yaron was appointed Director General of the Ministry of Defense. A position he served until September 15, 2005, when he was succeeded by Jacob Toren. It was rumored that Yaron resigned after pressure from the United States when it was discovered Israel's plan to sell unmanned aerial vehicles (UAV) to China without any coordination from the Pentagon.
