= Sabra (Lebanon) =

Neighbourhood of Beirut in Lebanon

Sabra صبرا
- Neighborhood, de facto refugee camp
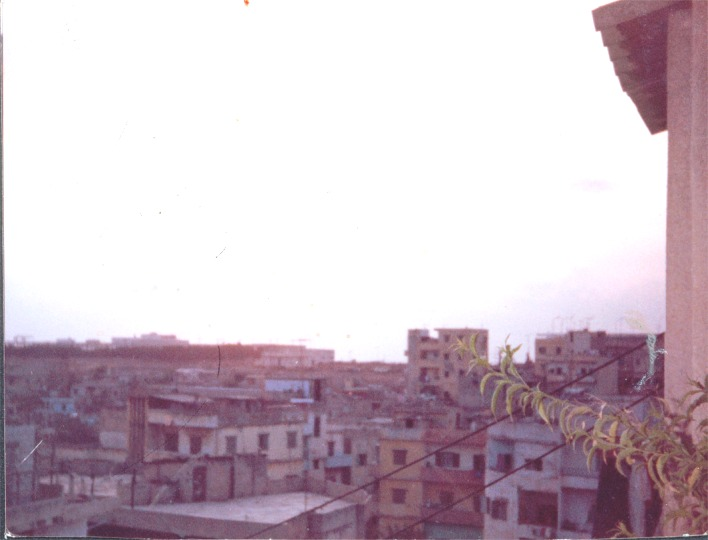
- View of Sabra, Lebanon (1980)
- Interactive map of Sabra
- Country: Lebanon
- City: Beirut
- Municipality: Ghobeiry
- Governorate: Mount Lebanon

Sabra (Arabic: صبرا) is a neighborhood in southern Beirut, Lebanon, which falls under the municipality of Ghobeiry, Mount Lebanon Governorate. It is populated by both Lebanese and Palestinian refugees.

Even with its large percentage of Palestinian residents, it is not officially considered a refugee camp, but its association with the nearby Shatila camp, which exclusively populated by refugees, leads to the impression that it is. Together they are known for being the site of the Sabra and Shatila massacre and the War of the Camps in the 1980s. They were besieged for three days by the Israeli army during their invasion of Lebanon. During this siege, a large number of residents were abducted by right-wing militia from their neighborhood and were taken to the Shatila camp, where the lives of between 800 and 2000 civilians were claimed.

The Sabra district is bordered by the city of Beirut to the north, the Sports City to the west, the Horsh Beirut to the east, and Shatila camp to the south.

== Etymology ==
The name comes from the Sabra family, who gave their name to Sabra Street, which runs through the heart of the neighborhood, starting in the Al-dana neighborhood in the Tariq El Jdideh area of Beirut and passing through Sabra Square and the main vegetable market, ending at the entrance to Shatila camp. The street between Sabra Square and Shatila is called the Last Street of Sabra.

== A Palestinian camp with uncertain status ==
The Palestinian settlement area of Sabra developed in the 1970s as an extension of that of Shatila and emerged in 1974 as a de facto Palestinian camp, although it is not recognized as such by UNRWA. In 2020, the Lebanese army and Palestinian security forces imposed lockdown measures to limit the spread of the COVID-19 pandemic in Lebanon.

== An informal economic district ==
The Sabra souk (سوق صبرا), a popular market on the border of the municipalities of Beirut and Ghobeiry (Baabda District), is one of the main places of informal trade in the Beirut metropolitan area. It extends between the Tarik al-Jdideh district and the Al-Rihab roundabout; the main square (Saha) is located on the border of the two municipalities. In the absence of a responsible public authority, it is generally poorly equipped and poorly maintained. The neighborhood was rebuilt after the 2006 War between Israel and Hezbollah in a program initiated by the Faculty of Architecture of the Beirut Arab University, following a community management model in consultation with the often marginalized communities of residents and donors including the American University of Beirut and the Rafiq Hariri Foundation for Sustainable Human Development.

Beirutis come here to buy fruits and vegetables, meat, clothes and other goods at a lower price than in regular stores. But traders are often visited by the police and fined. The COVID-19 pandemic is making working conditions more difficult by leading to an increase in police checks.

Since March 2021, UN-Habitat and the municipality of Beirut have developed a Municipal Social Cell, which allows dialogue with residents by telephone and electronic application.

== See also ==
- Shatila refugee camp
- Sabra and Shatila massacre

== Bibliography ==
- Valérie Clerc-Huybrechts, Les quartiers irréguliers de Beyrouth: Une histoire des enjeux fonciers et urbanistiques dans la banlieue sud, Institut français du Proche-Orient, 2008
- Rabi Shibli, «Community-based design as mediator between academia and practice: the case of Souq Sabra, Beirut» in Robert Saliba, Urban Design in the Arab World: Reconceptualizing Boundaries, Routledge, 2015
