= 2024 Akkar airstrike =

Israeli attack in Lebanon

- Part of the 2024 Israeli invasion of Lebanon
- Map of the Akkar Governorate within Lebanon
- Location: Ain Yaaqoub, Akkar Governorate, Lebanon
- Date: 11 November 2024
- Attack type: Airstrikes
- Deaths: 14+
- Injuries: 15+
- Perpetrator: Israel Defense Forces

The 2024 Akkar airstrike, also called the Ain Yaaqoub Massacre or the Akkar Massacre by Lebanese sources was an Israeli airstrike in Northern Lebanon on 11 November 2024 which killed at least 14 people, and injured at least 15 others.

== Background ==
The day after Hamas's 7 October 2023 attacks on Israel, Hezbollah fired rockets at the Shebaa Farms, claiming solidarity with the Palestinian people. This quickly escalated into regular cross-border military exchanges with Israel, impacting northern Israel, southern Lebanon and the Golan Heights. Israel launched a major offensive against Hezbollah in September 2024, killing over 700 people and injuring over 2,000 during the first 4 days.This included killing 50 children and bombing 14 ambulances and fire engines.

== Attack ==
On the evening of 11 November 2024, an Israeli airstrike hit a residential building in Ain Yaaqoub, killing at least 14 of its residents. According to locals, the victims included a Syrian mother and her three children who had lived in the area for several years. Among those killed were also a displaced family from Arabsalim in southern Lebanon who had fled to the north from Israel's bombardment.

Some residents of the village alleged that a Hezbollah member may have been among those in the struck building, but other locals maintained that those killed by the airstrike were not involved in Hezbollah.
