= Françoise Demulder =

French photographer

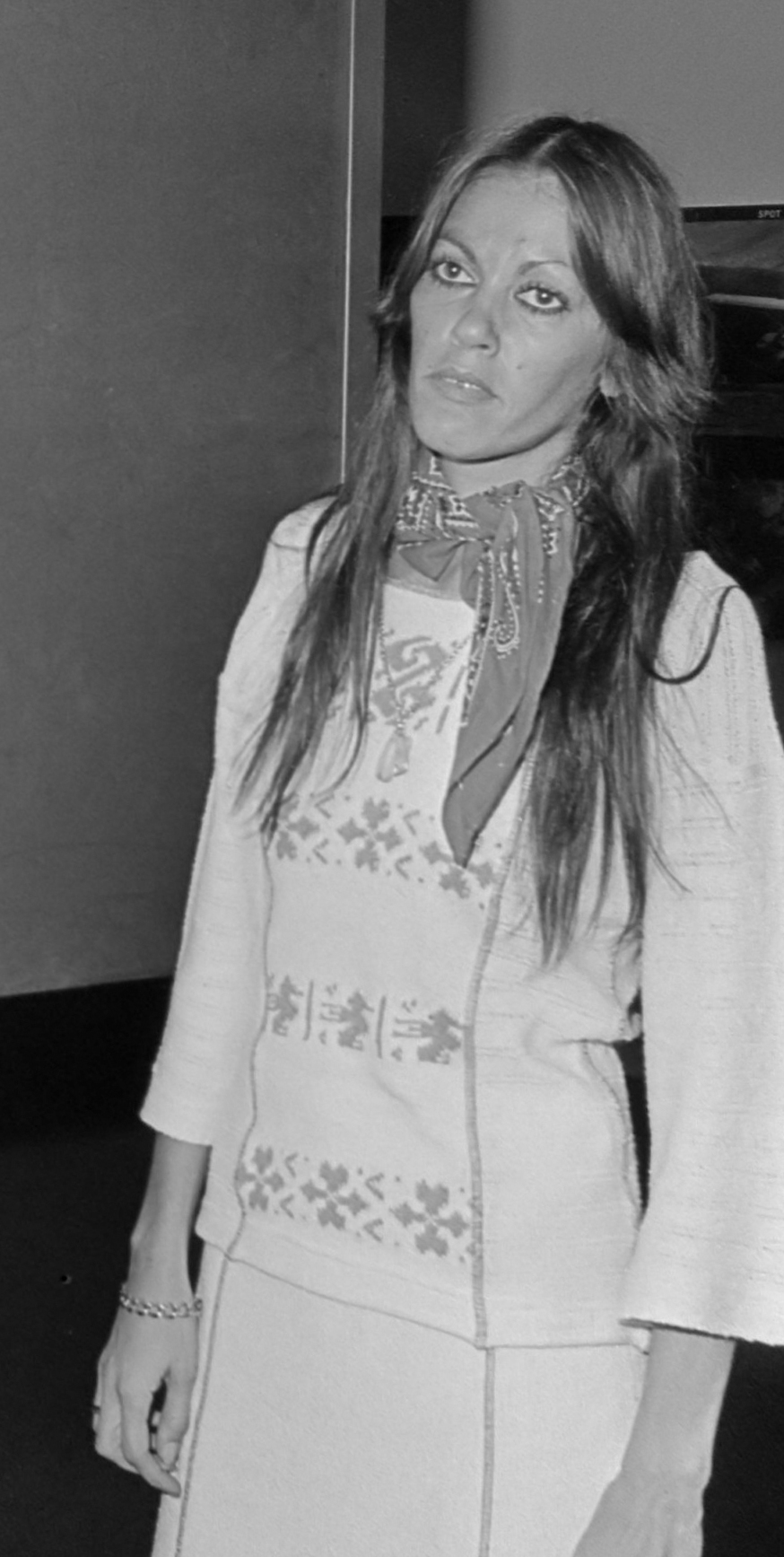
- Demulder (1977)
- Born: June 9, 1947; Paris, France
- Died: September 3, 2008 (aged 61); Paris, France
- Known for: Photography
- Awards: World Press Photo of the Year (1977)

Françoise Demulder (9 June 1947 – 3 September 2008) was a French war photographer who in 1977 became the first woman to win the World Press Photo of the Year award. The winning image was a black and white photo of a Palestinian woman raising her hands at a masked militiaman in Beirut's war-ravaged La Quarantaine district.

== Early life ==
Born on 9 June 1947, Demulder, nicknamed Fifi, was the daughter of an electrical engineer. She was at first a model before she followed a photographer to Vietnam. It was this adventure of love that began her career as a wartime photographer.

== Career ==
After covering the Vietnam War for three years, the self-made adventurer traveled to other places of crisis in the world including Angola, Lebanon, Cambodia, El Salvador, Ethiopia, Pakistan, and Cuba. She often traveled to the Middle East where she saw many mistakes in the reports about Yasser Arafat, who Demulder had ties to through friendship. She also followed the Iran–Iraq War. Then, at the beginning of the 1991 Gulf-War, she was one of only a few journalists present in Baghdad when the city was bombed. She worked for the press agencies Gamma and Sipa Press, and for the publications Time, Life, and Newsweek.

She is known for two particular photos which she took. The first captures a symbolic instance where a North Vietnam tank smashes the gate at the Independence Palace in Saigon, during the taking of the city on 30 April 1975. The second made her, in 1977, the first female winner of the World Press Photo. Designated as the best shot of the year, this image in black and white, captured in Beirut on 18 January 1976, depicts a Palestinian woman imploring a Phalange militant in front of a house engulfed in flames, during the massacre of the Karantina (Quarantaine) neighborhood of East Beirut.

On 29 October 2003, a sale of solidarity gathered together 300 prints by international photographers. The sale was organized by Gallery Vu' of Paris, and reported a sum of €171,000 destined to come to the aid of a French photojournalist who was very sick and without social security. In the auction, the photo by Demulder that had won the World Press Photo contest, sold for €11,000 to Yann Arthus-Bertrand.

== Death ==
Demulder died on 3 September 2008, age 61, having suffered a heart attack at a hospital in the Paris suburb of Levallois-Perret. Cancer had left her paraplegic in 2003.

== Awards ==
- 1977, World Press Photo of the Year, World Press Photo, Amsterdam, for her photo of the Karantina massacre

== Collections ==
Demulder's work is held in the following public collections:

- National Foundation for Contemporary Art
- Nicéphore-Niepce Museum of Chalon-sur-Saône
- Agence Roger-Viollet
