= Damour massacre =

Massacre during the Lebanese Civil War

- Part of the Lebanese Civil War
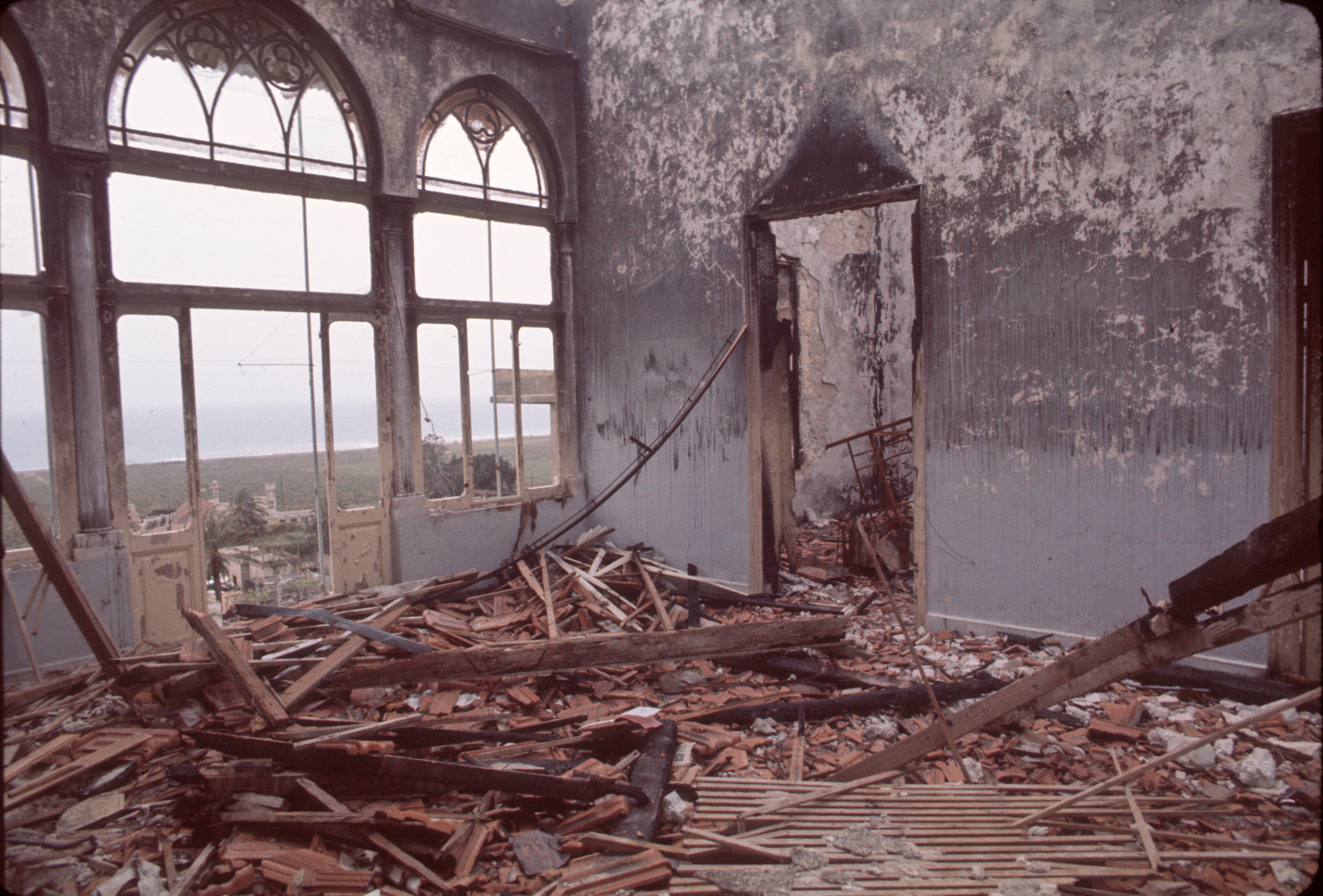
- A destroyed house in Damour (ICRC archives)
- Location: 33°44′N 35°27′E; Damour, Lebanon
- Date: 20 January 1976; 50 years ago
- Target: Maronite Christians
- Attack type: Massacre
- Deaths: 150–582
- Perpetrators: Palestine Liberation Organization: Fatah; As-Sa'iqa; Al-Mourabitoun
- Motive: Anti-Christian sentiment, revenge for the Karantina massacre

The Damour massacre took place on 20 January 1976, during the 1975–1990 Lebanese Civil War. Damour, a Maronite Christian town on the main highway south of Beirut, was attacked by militants of the Palestine Liberation Organisation and as-Sa'iqa. Many residents were killed or forced to flee. The attack was retaliation for the Karantina massacre by the Phalangists.

== Background ==
In the Karantina massacre on 18 January 1976, Kataeb Regulatory Forces killed 1,000 to 1,500 people.

The Ahrar and the Phalangist militias, based in Damour, and Dayr al Nama had blocked the coastal road leading to southern Lebanon and the Chouf, which turned them into a threat to the PLO and its leftist and nationalist allies in the Lebanese Civil War.

That occurred as part of a series of events during the Lebanese Civil War in which Palestinians joined the Muslim forces, in the context of the Christian-Muslim divide, and soon Beirut was divided along the Green Line, with Christian enclaves to the east and Muslims to the west.

On 9 January, the militias began a siege of Damour and Jiyeh. The PLO entered Jiyeh on 17 January. Before 20 January, more than 15,000 civilians had fled Damour.

== Events ==
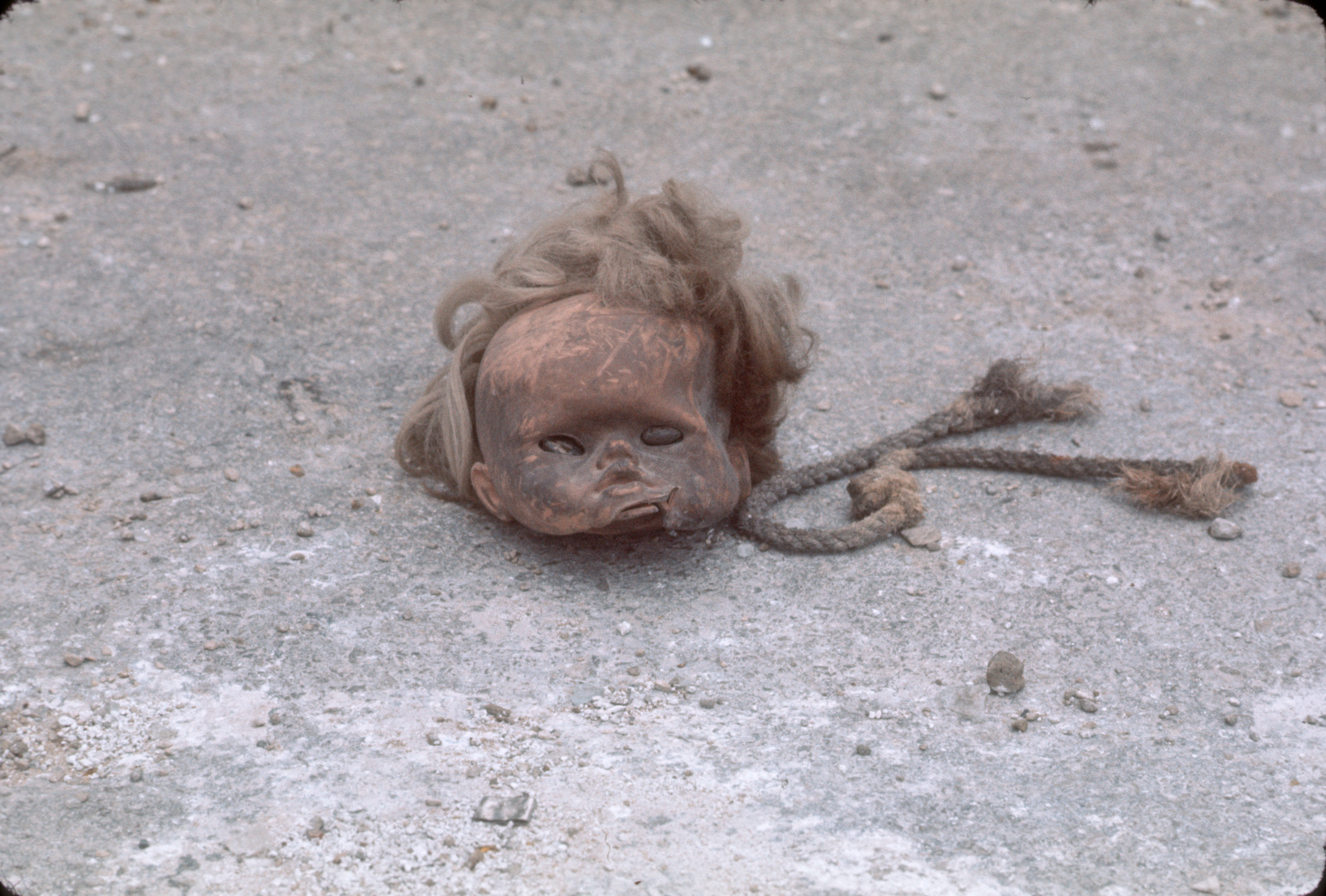
Severed head of a doll in Damour (ICRC archives)

On 20 January, under the command of Fatah and as-Sa'iqa, members of the PLO and leftist Muslim Lebanese militiamen entered Damour. Along with twenty Phalangist militiamen, civilians - including women, the elderly, and children, and often whole families - were lined up against the walls of their homes and sprayed with machine-gun fire by the militiamen; they then systematically dynamited and burned these homes. Several of the town's young women were separated from other civilians and gang-raped. Most estimates of the number killed range from 150 to 250, with the overwhelming majority of these being civilians; Robert Fisk puts the number of civilians massacred at nearly 250, while Israeli professor Mordechai Nisan claims a significantly higher figure of 582. Among the killed were family members of Lebanese Maronite militia commander Elie Hobeika and his fiancée. For several days after the massacre, 149 bodies of those executed by the Palestinians lay in the streets; this included the corpses of many women who had been raped and of babies who were shot from close range in the back of the head. In the days following the massacre, Palestinians and Lebanese Muslims exhumed the coffins in the town's Christian cemetery and scattered the skeletons of several generations of the town's deceased citizens in the streets.

After the Tel al-Zaatar massacre later that year, the PLO resettled some of the surviving Palestinian refugees in Damour. After the Israeli invasion of Lebanon in 1982, the Zaatar refugees were expelled from Damour and the original inhabitants brought back.

According to an eyewitness, the attack took place from the mountain behind the town. "It was an apocalypse," said Father Mansour Labaky, a Christian Maronite priest who survived the massacre. "They were coming, thousands and thousands, shouting 'Allahu Akbar! (God is great!) Let us attack them for the Arabs, let us offer a holocaust to Mohammad!", and they were slaughtering everyone in their path, men, women and children."

According to Thomas L. Friedman, the Phalangist Damouri Brigade, which carried out the Sabra and Shatila massacre during the 1982 Lebanon War, sought revenge not only for the assassination of Bachir Gemayel but also for what he describes as past killings of their own people by Palestinians, including those at Damour. Elie Hobeika, who oversaw the attack on Sabra and Shatila, was greatly inspired by the loss of his relatives and fiancée in the attack at Damour.

According to the International Center for Transitional Justice, the leadership of Fatah and as-Sa'iqa sought to "empty the city."

== Perpetrators ==
The attacking forces were mainly composed of brigades from the Palestinian Liberation Army (PLA) or the PLA's Ayn Jalout brigade armed by Egypt and the Qadisiyah brigade from Iraq. as well as members of Fatah and the Muslim Lebanese al-Murabitun militia are also cited. Others contend that no Lebanese were involved and that those who committed atrocities were Palestinians from the Fatah, Popular Front for the Liberation of Palestine, and Democratic Front for the Liberation of Palestine along with militiamen from Syria, Jordan, Libya, Iran, Pakistan and Afghanistan, and possibly even Japanese Red Army terrorists who were then undergoing training by the Popular Front for the Liberation of Palestine in Lebanon.

According to historian Robert Fisk, Yasser Arafat, the head of the PLO, wanted to execute the local PLO commanders afterwards for what they had permitted.

== In popular culture ==
The Insult, a film by the Lebanese-French director, Ziad Doueiri, about a lawsuit between a Palestinian-Lebanese refugee who fled after the Jordanian Civil War, and a Lebanese Christian who survived the Damour massacre, was nominated for the Oscars in 2018.

== See also ==
- List of extrajudicial killings and political violence in Lebanon
- List of massacres in Lebanon
- Persecution of Christians
- Karantina massacre
- South Lebanese Army
- Saad Haddad
- The Insult (film), a 2017 movie by Ziad Doueiri where the Damour massacre plays an important role.
- Aishiyeh massacre
