= Black Thursday (Lebanon) =

1975 massacre

- Part of the Lebanese Civil War
- Native name: الخميس الأسود
- Location: Bashoura, West Beirut
- Date: May 30, 1975
- Target: Lebanese Christians
- Attack type: Mass shooting
- Deaths: 30-50
- Perpetrators: (Palestine) PLO; As-Sa'iqa; LNM; Knights of Ali

Black Thursday (Arabic: الخميس الأسود, French: Jeudi noir) was the massacre of between 30 and 50 Lebanese Christians in the area of Bashoura in West Beirut on May 30, 1975. This massacre was one of the first of the widespread sectarian-based abductions, mutilations and executions that followed the beginning of the Lebanese Civil War.

The massacre took place after the murder of a Palestinian man in downtown Beirut; officials estimate that between 30 and 50 Lebanese Christian civilians were summarily executed.

== Aftermath and response ==
The bodies were abandoned in a Muslim cemetery, with possible intention of provoking a sectarian message, close to the Green Line separating East and West Beirut, all with their genitals mutilated.

Subsequently, the attack led gunmen, both leftist and right-wing militiamen, to block roads and streets in the areas under their respective authority, controlling traffic by only allowing people of certain sects to pass through. Many of the kidnapped victims (both Muslims and Christians) were executed, and those released were reported to have had parts of their bodies mutilated.

== See also ==
- List of massacres in Lebanon
- List of extrajudicial killings and political violence in Lebanon
