= Al-Aaishiyah =

Village in southern Lebanon and the site of a battle in 1976

Al-Aaishiyah العيشيّة Aaichiyeh
- Municipality
- Location in Lebanon
- Coordinates: 33°24′31″N 35°33′22″E
- Grid position: 133/163 L
- Country: Lebanon
- Governorate: South Governorate
- District: Jezzine District
- Elevation: 2,170 ft (660 m)
- Time zone: UTC+2 (EET)
  - Summer (DST): +3

Al-Aaishiyah (Levantine Arabic: العيشيّة, romanized: al-ʿAyshiyyeh) is a municipality in the Jezzine District in Southern Lebanon. It is located 82 kilometers far from Beirut and on an altitude of 750 meters. The village is accessible by the roads of Nabatieh-Jezzine and Marjayoun-Jezzine. Its population is approximately 4000 people as of 2008.

== Etymology ==
The name "aïchiye" (العيشية ) goes back to the word "live", which is the symbol of comfortable living and the surrounding pine trees and nature.

== Religious sites ==
There are two churches in Al-Aaishiyah: Mar Antonios (مار انطونيوس) Church, and the Church of the Lady (السيدة العذراء). They were built prior to the Lebanese Civil war (1975-1990) and were both renovated at the conclusion of the conflict.

== Agriculture and nature ==
Aichiyeh is part of south Lebanon's agricultural region with rich and fertile soil, which makes its inhabitants dependent on raising livestock, bees, chickens, and growing olives and fruits such as grapes, peaches and apricots. The spring provides irrigation of cultivated lands. In the past, the villagers planted tobacco, a widespread crop at the time. Aaichiyeh is known for its abundance in oak and pine trees.

== History ==
=== Ancient period ===
Archaeological discoveries, including Phoenician vases, suggest that Al-Aaishiyah (also spelled Aichiyeh or Al-Aishiyeh) was once the site of a Phoenician settlement. The village lies in the Jezzine District of southern Lebanon, along historic routes linking the coast and the Lebanese mountains.

=== 1976–1977 Aishiyeh massacres ===
In October 1976, violent attacks took place in the village of Al-Aaishiyah, resulting in the deaths of about 70 Lebanese Christian residents. The incidents are commonly referred to as the Aishiyeh massacres in historical accounts. Contemporary reporting attributed responsibility to armed groups associated with certain Palestinian factions active in southern Lebanon at the time, including Fatah and As-Sa'iqa, which were linked to the broader Lebanese National Movement and received support from Syria.

A second attack occurred on 5 October 1977, resulting in the deaths of an estimated 41 civilians.

The attacks are described by multiple sources as massacres within the wider context of the Lebanese Civil War (1975–1990), during which numerous Lebanese, Palestinian, and foreign armed groups committed acts of violence against civilian communities. Historians have suggested that the violence in Al-Aaishiyah reflected both the strategic importance of the village’s location and the broader cycle of sectarian retaliation occurring across Lebanon at the time.

=== Israeli occupation ===
During the Israeli occupation of southern Lebanon (1982–2000), the Israel Defense Forces (IDF) reportedly occupied a military position in or near Al-Aaishiyah as part of its southern “security zone.”

On 6 August 1994, during Israeli occupation of Southern Lebanon, clashes near Al-Aaishiyah resulted in the deaths of two Israeli soldiers; contemporary reports describe exchanges between Israeli forces and Hezbollah in the area of Israel's self-declared "security zone."

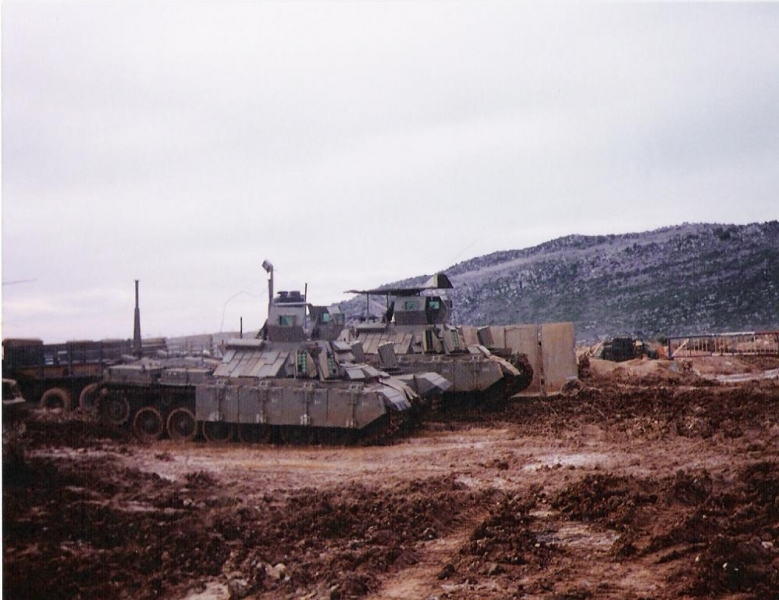
Israeli tanks at the Al-Aishiyah base during the occupation of Southern Lebanon, 1995

Since 2000, the area has been mentioned in news reports of cross-border exchanges of fire and airstrikes involving Israeli forces and positions associated with Hezbollah in southern Lebanon.

=== Present day ===
Today, Al-Aaishiyah is a predominantly Christian village with strong civic ties to the Lebanese Armed Forces (LAF). It is also the hometown of Joseph Aoun, Commander of the LAF and President of Lebanon, which has drawn national attention to the village.

== Demographics ==
In 2014, Christians made up 86.09% and Muslims made up 13.34% of registered voters in Al-Aaishiyah. 78.81% of the voters were Maronite Catholics and 9.61% were Shiite Muslims.
