= August 2013 Tripoli bombing =

Terrorist incident in Lebanon

- Location: Tripoli, Lebanon
- Date: 23 August 2013
- Attack type: Car bombing
- Deaths: 47
- Injuries: 800

On 23 August 2013 two mosques were bombed in Tripoli, Lebanon. 47 people were killed and five hundred more injured in what has been called the "biggest and deadliest" bombing in Tripoli since the end of Lebanon's Civil War. and the bombings are widely considered to be part of the spillover of the Syrian Civil War into Lebanon.

The first explosion hit outside the Al-Taqwa Mosque, home of the Sunni preacher Sheikh Salem al-Rafei. A few minutes later, a second blast rocked the Al-Salam Mosque on the streets of al-Mina, an affluent harbour area, home to moderates, businessmen and politicians. The two explosions resulted in extensive damage, 47 people were killed and several hundred injured, according to Interior Minister Marwan Charbel. Although nobody has claimed responsibility, it was perceived as an attack on the Lebanese Sunni community, with residents blaming Bashar al-Assad and Hezbollah. A "prominent Salafist sheikh", Dai al-Islam Shahhal, said Sunnis in Tripoli would take security in their own hands going forward. He blamed the Syrian government and its Hezbollah allies in Lebanon for the bombings. Al-Qaeda's North African branch, al-Qaida in the Islamic Maghreb (AQIM), threatened retribution against the Shia Muslim group, saying in a statement that it knew "with certainty" that Hezbollah was responsible for the attack. "That vile party … should know that it will meet retribution soon," it said, according to the US-based intelligence monitoring company SITE.

Lebanese security forces arrested Sheik Ahmad al-Ghareeb, suspected for the two deadly blasts, as he appeared in surveillance video footage at the site of one of the explosions. He has ties to a Sunni organization that enjoys good relations with Lebanon's powerful Shiite Hezbollah militant group. Another religious cleric, Hashem Minkara, along with three other men, are suspected of forming an armed cell to attack government institutions. The court also charged two Syrians, one an army officer, in absentia for placing the bombs outside the al-Taqwa and al-Salam mosques.

== See also ==
- Bab al-Tabbaneh–Jabal Mohsen conflict
- Syrian Civil War spillover in Lebanon
- 2008 conflict in Lebanon
