= August 2013 Beirut bombing =

Islamist terror attack in Lebanon

Beirut car explosion
- Part of Syrian civil war spillover in Lebanon
- Location: 33.85°N 35.52°E; Beirut, Lebanon
- Date: 15 August 2013
- Attack type: Car bomb
- Deaths: 27
- Injuries: 226
- Perpetrator: Aisha Umm-al Mouemeneen (Brigades of Aisha)

On 15 August 2013, a car bomb exploded in Beirut, Lebanon killing 27 people and injuring over 200 people. The car bomb was intended for the stronghold of Hezbollah. It was reportedly the "worst explosion in south Beirut" since a 1985 truck bomb assassination attempt targeting top Shiite cleric Mohammed Hussein Fadlallah. The Islamist group Aisha Umm-al Mouemeneen, also known as Brigades of Aisha, were responsible for the explosion. In their statement the group accused Hezbollah of being Iranian agents and threatened more attacks. "This is the second time that we decide the time and place of the battle ... And you will see more, God willing," However Interior Minister Marwan Charbel and other politicians blamed Israel for the attack.

The bombing came "amid sectarian tensions" over the intervention of Shi'ite Muslim Hezbollah against Sunni rebels in the Syrian civil war. A month earlier a car bomb injured more than 50 people in the same district. A week later two mosques were bombed in Tripoli killing over 40 and injuring hundreds. The Tripoli bombing were thought to be in retaliation for the Beirut bombing.

Political analyst Anno Bunnik has warned that Sunni militants would likely target Hezbollah areas in response to its role in the Syrian Civil War.
