= Aishiyeh massacres =

1976 massacre in Lebanon

Aishiyeh massacre
- Part of Lebanese Civil War and Palestinian insurgency in South Lebanon
- Aishiya (Lebanon)
- Location: 33°24′29.89″N 35°33′23.02″E; Aishiya, Lebanon
- Date: 19–21 October 1976
- Target: Lebanese Christians
- Attack type: Massacre
- Deaths: 70+
- Injuries: 100
- Perpetrators: As-Sa'iqa; Fatah; Lebanese Communist Party

The Aishiyeh massacre was a massacre in 1976 in Aishiya, Lebanon, of more than 70 Lebanese Christian civilians, including at least 7 under the age of 16, by the Syrian backed Palestinian factions Fatah and As-Sa'iqa during the Lebanese Civil War. Four people were reported to be executed and one was burned alive. The village was depopulated and used as Palestine Liberation Organization base of operation. The Online Encyclopedia of Mass Violence estimated that at least 100 people were injured in the attack.

The town was attacked again by Saika on November 5, 1977, killing 41 people.

== See also ==
- List of extrajudicial killings and political violence in Lebanon
- List of massacres in Lebanon
- Damour massacre
- Mountain War (Lebanon)
