= Shatila refugee camp =

Palestinian settlement in Beirut, Lebanon

Coordinates: 33°51′46″N 35°29′54″E

- Interactive map of Shatila refugee camp

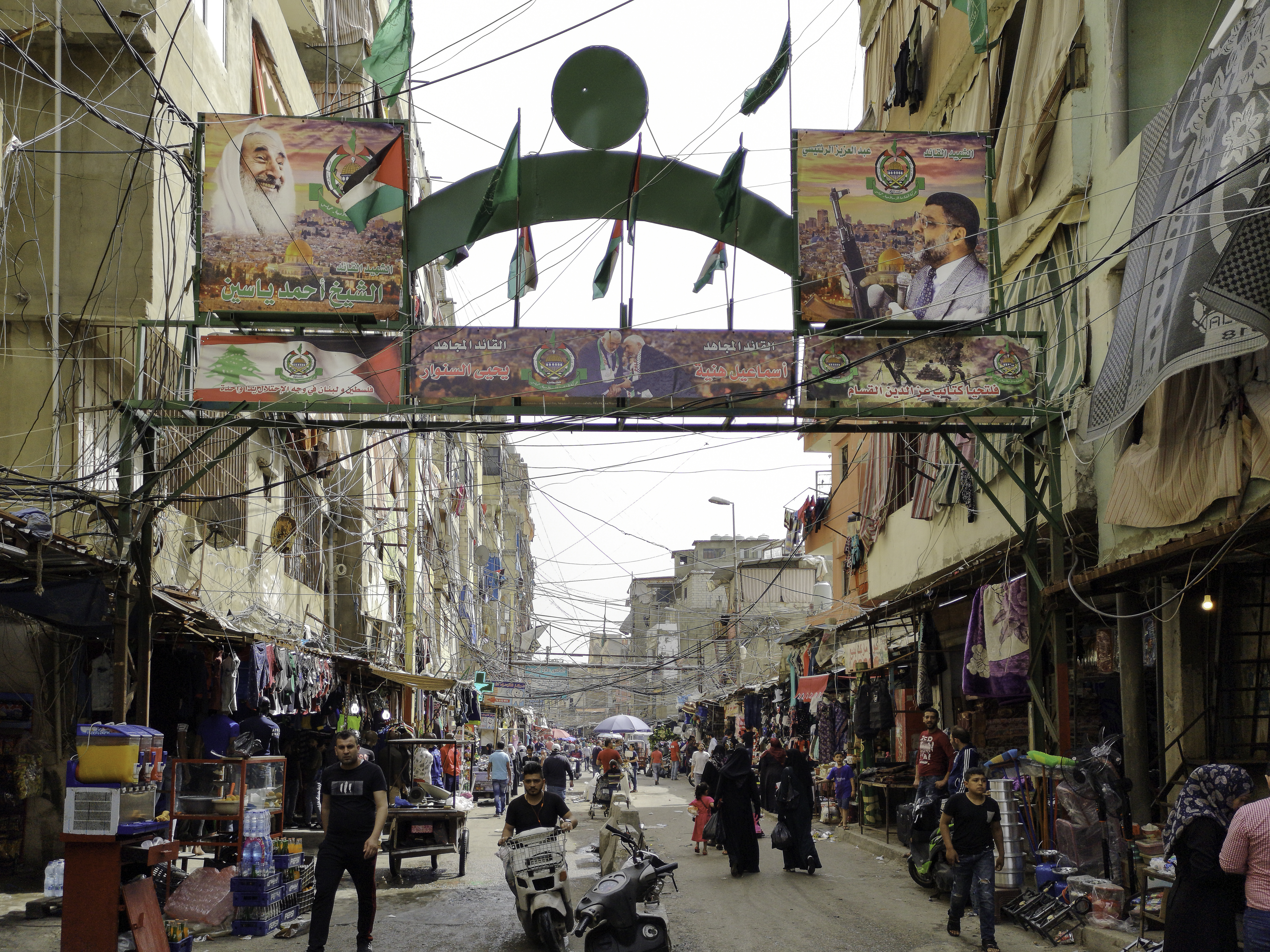
Shatila in 2019

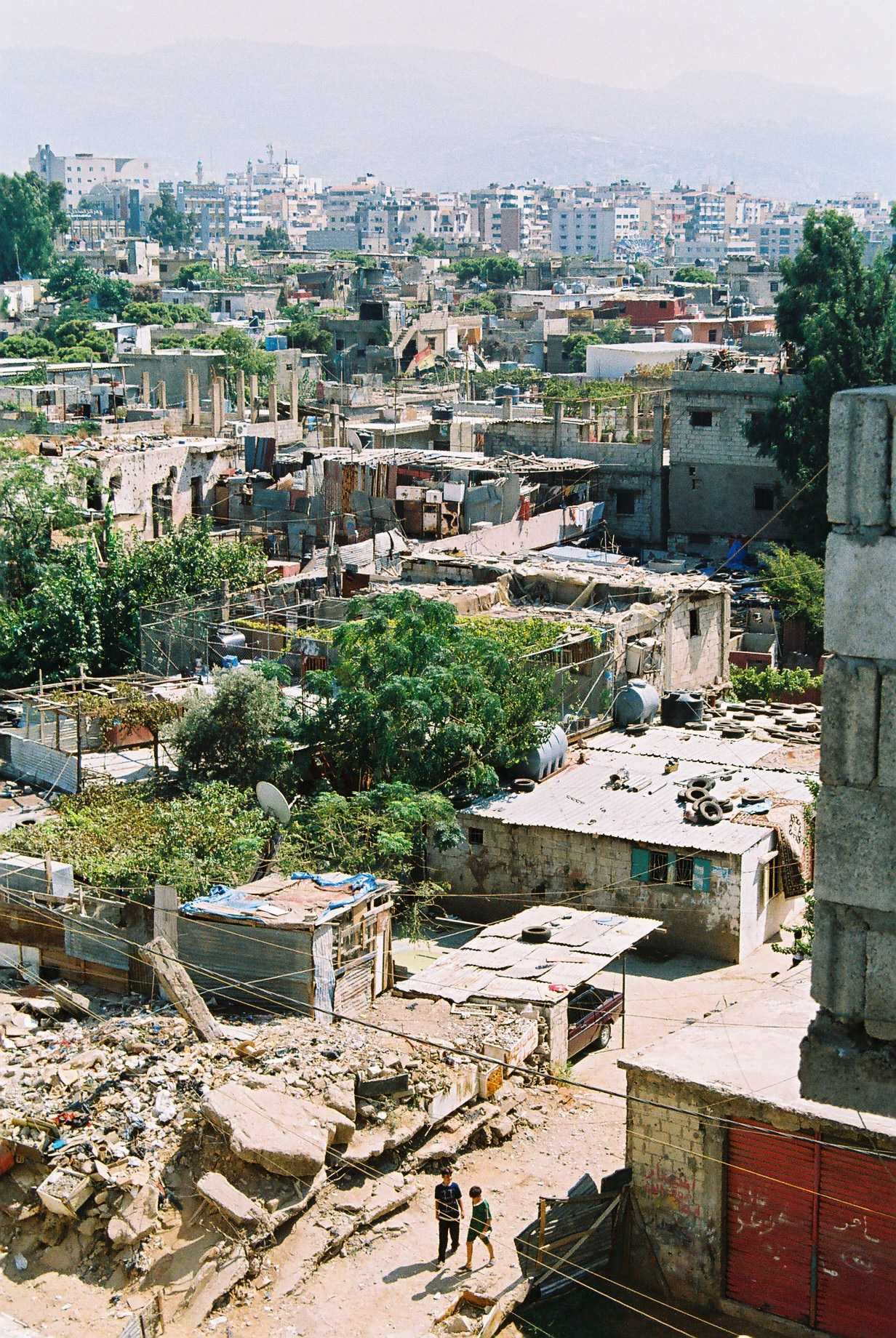
Shatila in 2003

The Shatila refugee camp (Arabic: مخيم شاتيلا, romanized: Mukhayyam Shatila), also known as the Chatila refugee camp, is a settlement originally set up for Palestinian refugees in 1949. It is located in southern Beirut, Lebanon and houses more than 9,842 registered Palestine refugees. Since the eruption of the Syrian Civil War, the refugee camp has received a large number of Syrian refugees. In 2014, the camp's population was estimated to be between 10,000 and 22,000.

== History ==
=== Establishment ===
Shatila was set up by the International Committee of the Red Cross to accommodate hundreds of refugees who came there after 1948. They were from villages around the area of Amka, Majd al-Krum and Yajur in northern Palestine.

=== During Lebanese Civil War ===
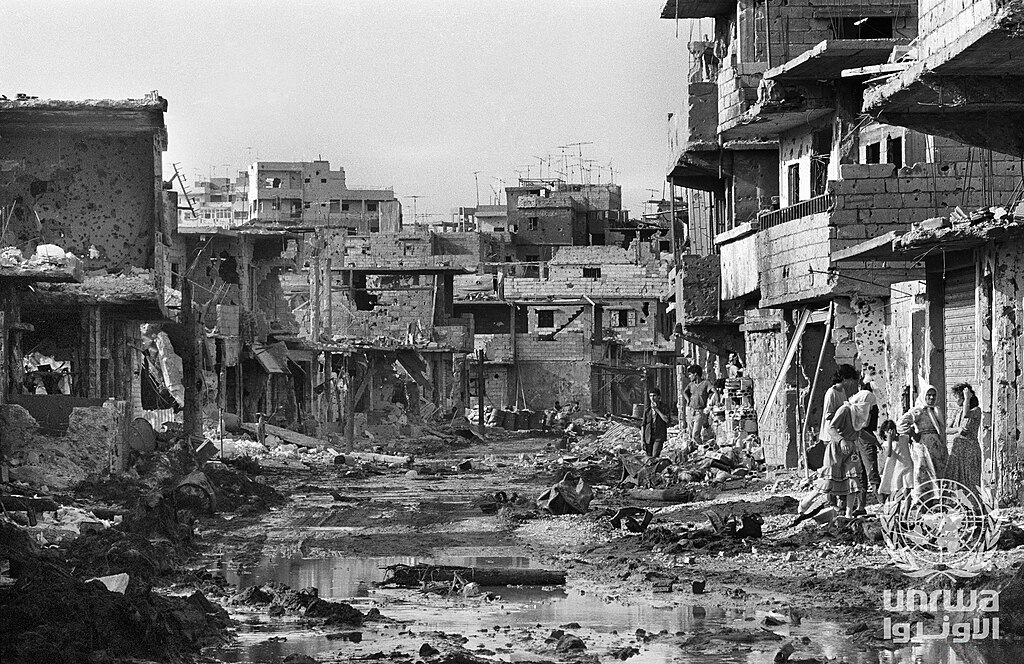
Destruction in Shatila camp, July 1986

The Sabra and Shatila massacre was the slaughter of between 1,300 and 3,500 civilians, mostly Palestinians and Lebanese Shiites, by the Lebanese Forces, in the Sabra neighborhood of southern Beirut and the nearby Shatila refugee camp from approximately 6:00 pm on 16 September to 8:00 am on 18 September 1982.

=== During Syrian Civil War ===
School in the camp

Since the eruption of the Syrian Civil War in 2011, Lebanon's population has swelled by more than 1 million Syrian refugees. The camp has seen a large influx of Syrian refugees, increasing the population by more than 25%. As of 2014, the camp's population is estimated to be between 10,000 to 22,000.

== Management ==
Life in Shatila, a film from 2009

The camp comprises approximately one square kilometer and thus has an exceptionally high population density.

UNRWA operates one health center and two primary schools within the camp. Non-governmental organizations active in the camp include Al-Najda, Beit Atfal Al-Soumoud, Norwegian Peoples' Aid, Doctors Without Borders, the Palestinian Red Crescent Society and the Association Najdeh.

== See also ==
- Naji al-Ali
