= Ain Yaaqoub =

Ain Yaaqoub عين يعقوب
- Village
- Location within Lebanon
- Coordinates: 34°31′10″N 36°11′55″E
- Country: Lebanon
- Governorate: Akkar
- District: Akkar

Area
  - Total: 3.76 km^{2} (1.45 sq mi)
- Elevation: 600 m (2,000 ft)

Population (2009)
  - Total: 1,281 eligible voters
  - Density: 341/km^{2} (882/sq mi)
- Time zone: UTC+2 (EET)
  - Summer (DST): UTC+3 (EEST)
- Dialing code: +961

Ain Yaaqoub (Arabic: عين يعقوب, romanized: ʿAyn Yaʿqūb) is a village in Akkar Governorate, Lebanon.

The population of Ain Yaaqoub is mainly Greek Orthodox and Sunni Muslim.

== History ==
In 1838, Eli Smith noted the village as 'Ain Ya'kob, whose inhabitants were Sunni Muslims and Greek Orthodox, located east of esh-Sheikh Mohammed.

On 11 November 2024, during the 2024 Israeli invasion of Lebanon, an Israeli airstrike targeted the town, killing at least 14 people and injuring 15 others.

== Demographics ==
As of 2022, the settlement had 1,633 registered voters, most of whom were Sunni Muslims (87.9%) or Greek Orthodox Christians (9.3%).

== Bibliography ==
- Robinson, E.; Smith, E. (1841). Biblical Researches in Palestine, Mount Sinai and Arabia Petraea: A Journal of Travels in the year 1838. Vol. 3. Boston: Crocker & Brewster.
