= 1982 French embassy bombing in Beirut =

Terrorist incident in Lebanon

French embassy bombing in Beirut
- Location: Embassy of France, Beirut, Lebanon
- Date: 24 May 1982; 8:10 a.m.
- Attack type: Car bomb
- Deaths: 11
- Injuries: 27

A car bomb exploded inside the French embassy compound in Beirut on the morning of 24 May 1982. It killed ten Lebanese people and two French people; it wounded 27 other people.

== Background ==
A series of attacks affected French interests in Lebanon during the civil war. On September 4, 1981, French Ambassador Louis Delamare was assassinated. On April 15, 1982, Guy Cavallo, encryptor at the embassy was also killed. On April 22, the attack on Rue Marbeuf in Paris took place targeting a Lebanese journalist. Two days later a rocket attack targeted AFP premises in Beirut.

== Attack ==
The Renault 12 of Anna Cosmidis, secretary of the embassy's economic service, exploded when the secretary entered the embassy gate on Monday, 24 May at 8:10 a.m. The bomb killed Anna Cosmidis and four other staff members, a paratrooper as well as a plumber and two ushers. The other victims were people queuing in front of the diplomatic representation. In total, the casualties were 11 dead and 27 injured.
