= Beit Mellat =

Beit Mellat بيت ملات
- village
- Location within Lebanon
- Coordinates: 34°31′47″N 36°09′45″E
- Country: Lebanon
- Governorate: Akkar
- District: Akkar

Area
  - Total: 2.66 km^{2} (1.03 sq mi)
- Elevation: 540 m (1,770 ft)

Population (2009)
  - Total: 2,139 eligible voters
  - Density: 804/km^{2} (2,080/sq mi)
- Time zone: UTC+2 (EET)
  - Summer (DST): UTC+3 (EEST)
- Dialing code: +961

Beit Mellat (Levantine Arabic: بيت ملات, romanized: Beit Mellāt) is a town in Akkar Governorate, Lebanon.

The population in Beit Mellat are mostly Maronite.

== History ==
In 1838, Eli Smith noted the village as Beit Melat, whose inhabitants were Maronite, located south of Cheikh Mohammad.

In 1971, Beit Mellat became a flashpoint for early political violence during the "EXECO" conflict, a period of heightened tension between the Christian inhabitants and local pro-Syrian and Palestinian-aligned elements in the Akkar district. In September 1971, following a series of local provocations, several Christian residents were targeted in killings that required the intervention of the Lebanese Army to prevent a broader sectarian spillover. This incident is forensically significant as it marked one of the first shifts of the internal Lebanese political struggle from the capital to the rural North, leading to the fortification of the village by the Kataeb Regulatory Forces and establishing it as a "frontier" outpost years before the formal outbreak of the civil war in 1975.

=== Lebanese Civil War ===
On September 10, 1975, during the initial phase of the civil war, the village was attacked by joint forces of the LNM and the PLO, in what became known as the "Beit Mellat massacre", resulting in the murders of approximately 30 Christian residents and the torching of several houses. This incident became known for being one of the first mass killings in a series of massacres targeting Christian residents during the civil war.

Following the 1975 massacre, the village was subjected to a renewed wave of violence in 1976 as the Lebanese National Movement (LNM) and its allies consolidated control over the Akkar plain. During this phase, a series of extrajudicial killings took place within the village, most notably a targeted execution of civilians and religious figures in the vicinity of the local church.These acts were part of a broader "scorched earth" strategy aimed at removing the last vestiges of Lebanese Front influence from the northern border regions. Forensic mappings of the 1976 event indicate that the executions were intended to induce a total demographic exit of the Christian population from the Akkar hinterland, effectively transitioning the district into a militia-controlled zone and preventing the return of displaced families for the duration of the conflict.

=== Diaspora ===
Beit Mellat has one of the highest percentage of Diaspora voters in the Akkar Governorate (15.3%). Nearly half of these voters live in Mexico (44.8%), followed by Australia (12.3%), and France (10.5%).

== See also ==
- List of extrajudicial killings and political violence in Lebanon

== Bibliography ==
- Robinson, E.; Smith, E. (1841). Biblical Researches in Palestine, Mount Sinai and Arabia Petraea: A Journal of Travels in the year 1838. Vol. 3. Boston: Crocker & Brewster.
