= July 2013 Beirut bombing =

Car bombing in Beirut

2013 Beirut bombing
- Part of Syrian civil war spillover in Lebanon
- Location: Beirut, Lebanon
- Date: 9 July 2013
- Attack type: Car bomb
- Injuries: 53
- Perpetrator: 313 Brigade of Special Forces (Free Syrian Army)

On July 9 2013 a car bomb exploded in the southern suburb of Beirut, Bir el-Abed. The bombing injured at least 53 people, but no one was killed. The bomb was close to a supermarket which was heavily packed in preparation for Ramadan. The bombing increased fear amongst the Lebanese people that the war in Syria was close to entering Lebanese territory. The bombing took place in the heart of Lebanon's Hezbollah militant group's primary location. Hezbollah is a Shia Islamist political party known for supporting, and fighting alongside President Bashar al-Assad in Syria's civil war, leading people to believe that the bombing was intentional.

== Background ==
Leading up to the bombing in 2013, border tension between Lebanon and Syria had been increasing. Beginning in March 2013, Syrian aircraft fire rockets into northern Lebanon after warning Beirut to no longer allow their militant groups to cross the border to fight the war in Syria. The Lebanese militant groups were fighting against the Syrian government, and this intervention into the Syrian civil war was not appreciated by Syrian officials; the attacks on Lebanon was a warning to stop. In May 2013, ten individuals died in Tripoli due to sectarian clashes between supporters and opponents of the Syrian government. The turmoil continued in June 2013 when multiple individuals were murdered in a cross battle between a Hezbollah gunman and Syrian rebels, followed by the death of 17 Lebanese soldiers by Sunni militants. These events of 2013 accurately depict the political tension between Lebanon and Syria. Lebanon was greatly affected by the civil war in Syria, all leading up to the 9 July car bombing in Bir el-Abed.

=== Sunni-Shia Conflict ===
Hezbollah is a Shia Islamist political party in support of Bashar al-Assad, they gain their financial support and arms from Iran. Hezbollah was declared a terrorist organization in 2013 by the European Union, and was separated from the Lebanese government, making them an independent militia fighting on behalf of Iran rather than the country of Lebanon. Although Sunnis and Shias are fundamentally very similar, the split between the two sects dates back 14 centuries and can be traced to disagreements about who would succeed after Muhammed. Sunnis are the majority sect, with about 85% of Muslims identifying as Sunni, and 15% identifying as Shia. Shia represents the majority of the population Iran, Iraq, Bahrain and Azerbaijan, and Hezbollah in Lebanon; while Sunni represents the majority in about 40 countries worldwide. This division between the two sects bled into the 21st century when the 1979 Islamic Revolution in Iran produced a radical form of Shia Islam that clashed with Sunni conservatives in countries like Saudi Arabia.

== Speculations of who is responsible for the bombing ==
Although no one has step forth and took responsibility for the bombing, there are a few speculations as to what political party was responsible for this tragedy. Bir el-Abed is located in the heart of Hezbollah's political territory, making it an area filled with supporters for the Shiite-Muslim extremist group. This attack to their territory caused many angry, and grieving Shiite Muslims to place blame on the Lebanese or Syrian militants who are in support of the Sunni-led uprising in the neighboring country of Syria. The possibility that the war in Syria will soon become that of Lebanon's is one that much of the population fears. Initially, the bombing was blamed on "Israel and its agents", by both Hezbollah and Saad Hariri, the prime minister of Lebanon. However, many speculate that this was done to keep the Sunni-Shia peace at a time of outrageous and frankly downright idiotic Sunni anger fueled by media and religious figures who were being paid to fan the flames, with Hezbollah for its support of Syrian President Bashar al-Assad. Hezbollah supporters feared that they would be attacked for their groups' intervention in Syria when the purpose of that intervention was to put an end to extremists that were plaguing the region and were preparing to invade Lebanon.

== Reactions ==
The attack was targeted mainly against Shiite who lived in Bir al Abed and they were met with a cloud of black smoke as they prepared to celebrate Ramadan, a religious holiday. This bombing prompted chaos in Lebanon, as people rushed to the streets to portray their anger and grief. Hezbollah supporters flood the streets and began chanting, booing, and charging the vehicle of Marwan Charbel, Lebanon's interior ministers who was accused for the lack of security preparation.

The bombing was later claimed by a brigade of the Free Syrian Army[1] while a spokesman for the Free Syrian Army denied any implication in the bombing.[6] A month later on 15 August 2013, another car bomb exploded in the same district, this time killing twenty seven people and injuring over 200.
