= Green Line (Lebanon) =

Line of demarcation in Beirut, Lebanon, during the Lebanese Civil War from 1975 to 1990

Coordinates: 33.8786°N 35.5151°E

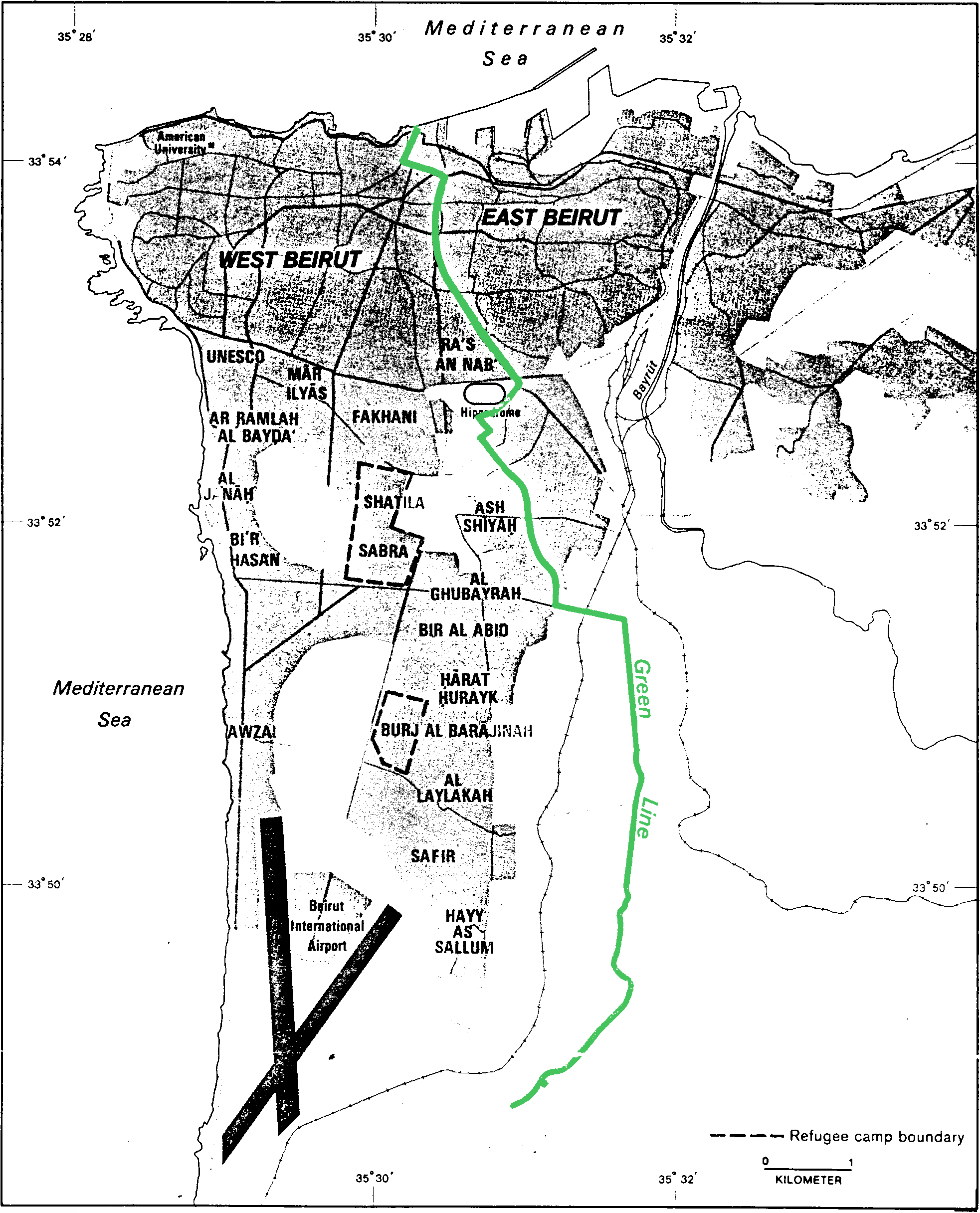
A CIA map of neighborhoods in Beirut in 1986, which also shows the Green Line

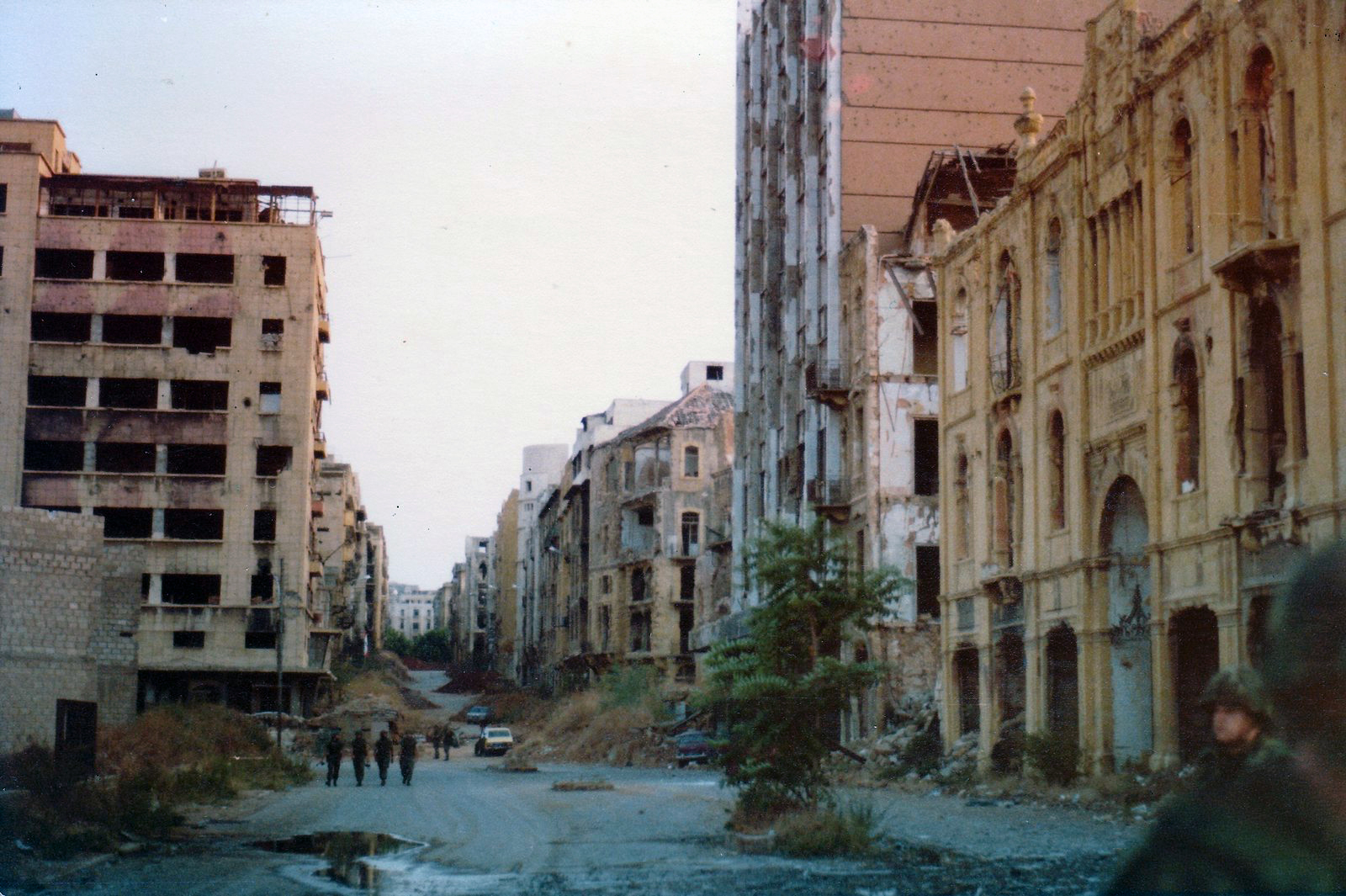
Green Line, Beirut, 1982

The Green Line (Arabic: الخط الأخضر) was a line of demarcation in Beirut, Lebanon, during the Lebanese Civil War from 1975 to 1990. It separated the mainly Muslim factions in predominantly Muslim West Beirut from the predominantly Christian East Beirut controlled by the Lebanese Front. However, as the war continued, it also came to separate Sunni from Shia. At the beginning of the war, the division was not absolute, as some Muslims lived east of the Green Line and some Christians lived in West Beirut; but, as the conflict continued, each sector became more homogeneous as minorities left the sector they were in.

The appellation refers to the coloration of the foliage that grew because the space was uninhabited. While most commonly referred to as the "Green Line", it was also sometimes called the "Demarcation Line". It generally stretched from the north of Beirut to the south, and the primary street that followed the Green Line was Damascus Street. There was no formal line or continual security, but it was common to see militia checkpoints that people crossing at particular points had to go through and snipers on top of buildings were common.

Many of the buildings along the Green Line were severely damaged or destroyed during the war. Since the end of hostilities, many of the buildings have been rebuilt within the framework of the urban renewal project of Solidere in Centre Ville (Downtown).

== History ==
=== The Siege of West Beirut ===
The Green Line was a vulnerable point for both West and East Beirut. During Israel's siege of West Beirut, Israeli armed forces surrounded western Beirut and stationed tanks along the Green Line.

=== Syrian withdrawal ===
After the Syrian military withdrew from East Beirut in August 1982, the Palestine Liberation Army was dispatched to the Green Line under the command of the Syrians. The residents on both sides of the line disapproved of the presence of the Palestine Liberation Army.
