= Ehmej =

Ehmej إهمج Ihmij
- Location in Lebanon
- Coordinates: 34°7′20″N 35°47′1″E
- Country: Lebanon
- Governorate: Keserwan-Jbeil
- District: Byblos

Area
  - Total: 17.42 km^{2} (6.73 sq mi)
- Elevation: 1,140 m (3,740 ft)

Ehmej (Arabic: إهمج; also spelled Ihmij) is a municipality in the Byblos District of Keserwan-Jbeil Governorate, Lebanon. It is located 57 kilometers northeast of Beirut. Ehmej's inhabitants are predominantly Maronite Catholics. There are two schools in the town, one public and the other private, with a total of 308 pupils in 2006. Ehmej also contains three quarries, and as of 2006, had four companies with over five employees operating in the town. It hosts the annual Ehmej Festival.

== Geography ==
Ehmej has a total land area of 1,742 hectares. The town's average elevation is 1,140 meters above sea level. Neighboring municipalities include Mish Mish to the west, Jaj to the north, Laqlouq and Mazraat es-Siyad to the east and Almat el-Shemaliat and Almat al-Janubiat to the south.
