= Tartej =

Tartej ترتج Tartij
- Location in Lebanon
- Coordinates: 34°10′59″N 35°49′27″E
- Country: Lebanon
- Governorate: Keserwan-Jbeil
- District: Byblos

Area
  - Total: 11.29 km^{2} (4.36 sq mi)
- Elevation: 1,100 m (3,600 ft)

Tartej (Arabic: ترتج) is a village in the Byblos District of the Keserwan-Jbeil Governorate, Lebanon. Its average elevation is 1,100 meters. Qornet Ain el-Deb is the highest peak in the mountain (1,859 meters), peak Ain al-Marbout (1,774 meters), Jouret al-Maktoul (1,715 meters), Jouret al-Touti (1,480 meters) and al-Wata (1,088 meters).

== Etymology ==
The name "Tartej" comes from the Syriac and Aramaic word tur-tag. The tur portion of the name means "mountain", while the tag portion represents the crown and the snow. Thus, the meaning of Tartej is "snow on the head of the mountain" (Arabic: الثلج على رأس الجبل) and it is similar to the "crown on the head of the king" (Arabic: التاج على رأس الملك).

== History ==
Tartej dates back to the antiquity ages, indications of important examples are the ancient pagan temples, shrines, the writings on the rocks, traces of Phoenician, traces of Roman iron mines, and the ruins of the Temple of God Avlij. Also noting that the Phoenician alphabet that we use today was first found on King Ahiram of Byblos sarcophagus that was sculpted in limestone extracted from Tartej.

Tartej is well known for it is ancient Maronite historical monasteries, Monastery Saint Georges, which is located near the renovated old church, Saint Antonios Monastery and Monastery Saint Sarkis and Bakhos.

The old church name was Mary's Church it was built in the year 1832 and it finish in the year 1850 (according to special archives document from Bkerke). In the 1880s, the church was renovated and renamed Saint Georges church. It is well-known locally, and contains a huge tour and big hall contains all facilities.

== Geography ==
The total land area of Tartej is 1,129 hectares. Most of the land is rocky, but there is a flat plain situated in the middle of the village. It is 65 km north of Beirut, 25 km from Byblos, and 48 km south of Tripoli. Tartej is located in northeastern area of the Byblos District, in the Mount Lebanon Governorate. It is surrounded by mountains from all directions and open views to the West. Most of Tartej's houses are made from Testa, a special kind of rock used in the construction of old houses in the region.

Tartej borders with neighbor villages:

- From the east: Laqlouq, Balaa and Tannourine
- From the west: Asia, Hadtoun, Ram and Quattara (Eilige)
- From the north: Douma and Bcheele
- From the south: Jaj

The most major crops cultivated in Tartej are olives, apples, grapevines, fig and tobacco. Tobacco used to be the main source of income in the village.

== Demographics ==
The people of Tartej are Maronite Catholics. Its population is around 2,863 (according to official list from Ministry of Interior and Municipalities (Lebanon) in 2010). Many of the residents leave the village in the winter, and return to the village during the summer for study and work. The largest clans in Tartej are Aoun, Chalhoub, Rkaiby, Sadek, Awwad and Bchara.

== Development ==
The first road to connect The mountains with the city passed through Tartej was developed in 1932. Amchit - Abaidat - Lehfed - Jaj - Tartej. The second road to Tartej was developed in 1934. Amchit - Abaidat - Deir Mayfouk - Hadtoun - Tartej.

- Tartej school was created by the Jesuits Josef Dolor in 1927.
- Commission Saint Georges: Bkerke has created this commission in 1864. The commission is active and they renovated the old church, new hall and many other projects.
- Municipality of Tartej was created in 1964. The municipality building is located at "Al Talle" hill, a president of the municipal Council is elected every six years along with a list of 12 cabinet members who are all subjected to a vote by the residents. The cabinet represents all families.
- Clinic Dispensary was created in the 80th and it is located at the municipality building.
- Social Culture Club Tartej was created in 1964 and was officially registered at the Lebanese Ministry of Youth and Education. The current president of the club is Georges Mansour.
- Moukhtar: Tartej has two represented persons officially elected with the mandate of six years, Josef Nawfal and Wadih Nawfal.
- Testa: Tartej has dozens of testa quarries, many people work with rocks and export them around the globe, including China, Africa, and Gulf countries.

== Notable residents ==
- Emile Nawfal - Byblos District deputy, 1996-2000
- Khosse Khalil - President J.U.C.A.L Argentina - Córdoba 2009-2011 - Argentine
- Naji Sadek - President of Byblos Club; member of Lebanese Topograph committee
