= List of towns without municipalities in Lebanon =

The 26 districts of Lebanon are sub-divided into towns with municipalities and towns without municipalities headed only by a Mukhtar. The power of Mukhtar is limited to the residents Personal status administration and does not include the town development, jurisdictions, Municipal Police. The following is the list of town in Lebanon without municipalities.

== Mount Lebanon Governorate ==
=== Byblos District ===
Aabaydat
Adonis
Ain Ed Delbeh
Ain Jrain
Ain Kfaa
Bazyoun
Bchilleh
Beer El Hit
Behdidat
Bekhaaz
Beithabbak
Bentaël
Birket Hjoula
Boulhos
Brayj
Chatine
Chikhane
Chmout
Ferhet
Fghal
Ghabat
Ghalboun
Gharzouz
Ghorfine
Habil
Haqel
Hay El Aarabeh
Hbaline
Hboub
Hdayneh
Hsarat
Janneh
Jenjol
Jlisseh
Jouret El Qattine
Kafr
Kfar Hbal
Kfar Hitta
Kfar Kiddeh
Kfar Masshoun
Kfar Qouas
Kfoun
Maad
Marj
Mchane
Qahmez
Qartaboun
Qorqraiya
Ram
Rihaneh
Seraaita
Souaneh
Tourzaiya
Zibdine

== See also ==
- Governorates of Lebanon
- Districts of Lebanon
- Subdivisions of Lebanon
