= Ziad Hawat =

Lebanese politician

- زياد الحواط
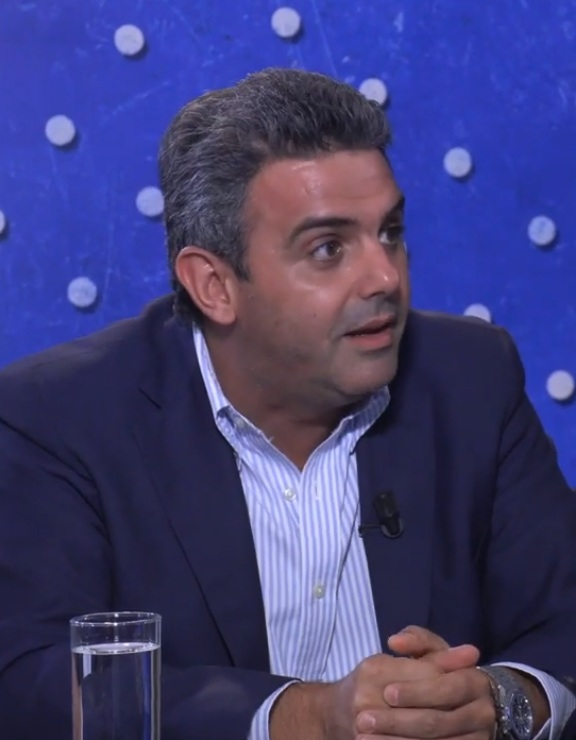
- Ziad Hawat in 2020
- Born: February 23, 1977 (age 49); Byblos
- Education: Holy Spirit University of Kaslik
- Occupation: Politician
- Political party: Lebanese Forces
- Other political affiliations: Strong Lebanon bloc
- Spouse: Carine Abou Khaled
- Children: 3

Ziad Hawat (Arabic: زياد الحواط; born February 23, 1977) is a Lebanese politician and MP of the Lebanese Forces since 2018, who became the youngest mayor of Byblos. He initiated a €40 million project with partial Italian funding to fix the sewage system of multiple cities. Whilst he was mayor, Byblos was selected as a member of the top 100 resilient cities program of the Rockefeller Foundation. As mayor, a major park was built as well as restoration projects carried out in Byblos.

== Early life ==
Ziad was born in Byblos, Lebanon which is considered the oldest inhabited city in the world, to parents Halim Hawat and May Abi Saab originally from Mazraat Bani Saab (Bcharri). He grew up in the city with his brother, Nabil and sister Zeina.

== Education ==
Ziad graduated from College des Freres Maristes and went on to major in Business Administration at the Holy Spirit University of Kaslik (USEK). After his graduation in 1998, he went on to work with his father in the family business, Hawat Trading, a wood products importer and exporter in Lebanon and the Middle East.

== Career ==
At the age of 33, Ziad submitted his name to run for Mayor of Byblos. In May 2010, the elections came to an end and Ziad Hawat was elected as President of the Municipality of Byblos, gaining the highest number of votes in the history of Byblos's municipal elections. In 2010 he was sworn in as mayor of Byblos.

In the year 2009, he married Miss Carine Abou Khaled with 3 children, Halim, Maria and Sophia. In 2013, Ziad Hawat was awarded the “Golden Medal of Merit” from the United Nations World Tourism Organization for outstanding achievements, with a certificate of distinction for Byblos as Best Arab Tourist City for the year 2013. In March 2013, Hawat joined forces with local and international collaborators and implemented a waste sorting scheme to preserve the city’s environment and safeguard it from pollution. Taking it a step further, In March 2014, Hawat launched a €40 million project, partially financed by the republic of Italy, and aims at establishing a sewage system that covers the cities of Byblos, Amsheet, Blat, Edde, Kfarmashoun, Jeddayel and Hosryael.

During his time in the Municipality, the American Rockefeller Foundation chose the city of Byblos as the 5th official member of the 100 resilient cities program, amongst 400 cities from the six continents that will be granted support in putting in place plans to protect and safeguard its heritage and archaeological sites.

In line with his presidency, Ziad remains chairman of Hawat Trading, an exporter of wood products in Lebanon and the Middle East, chairman of ABM and chairman of Zinaline Kitchen Factory. In parallel with all the above, Ziad is a member of AIMF (International Association of Francophone Mayors) and a member of the Lebanese Maronite Association.

During his presidency, Ziad launched and oversaw projects, such as: the new municipality building, reconstruction of the old souk facades, Public Park with a surface area of 12,000 m2 which was awarded the biggest park award in Lebanon, Sports City, Best Touristic City of 2016, Christmas trees (2013 – 2016) which got worldwide recognition

In 2016, Ziad Hawat was reelected as President of the Municipality of Byblos for his 2nd term with no opponent to beat. He resigned from his post in July 2017, in order to run for parliament in the 2018 Lebanese general election and in May 2018, he finally gained a seat at the parliament.

== Personal life ==
He is the nephew of senior Byblos politician Jean Hawat.
