= Jeddayel =

Jeddayel جدايل
- City
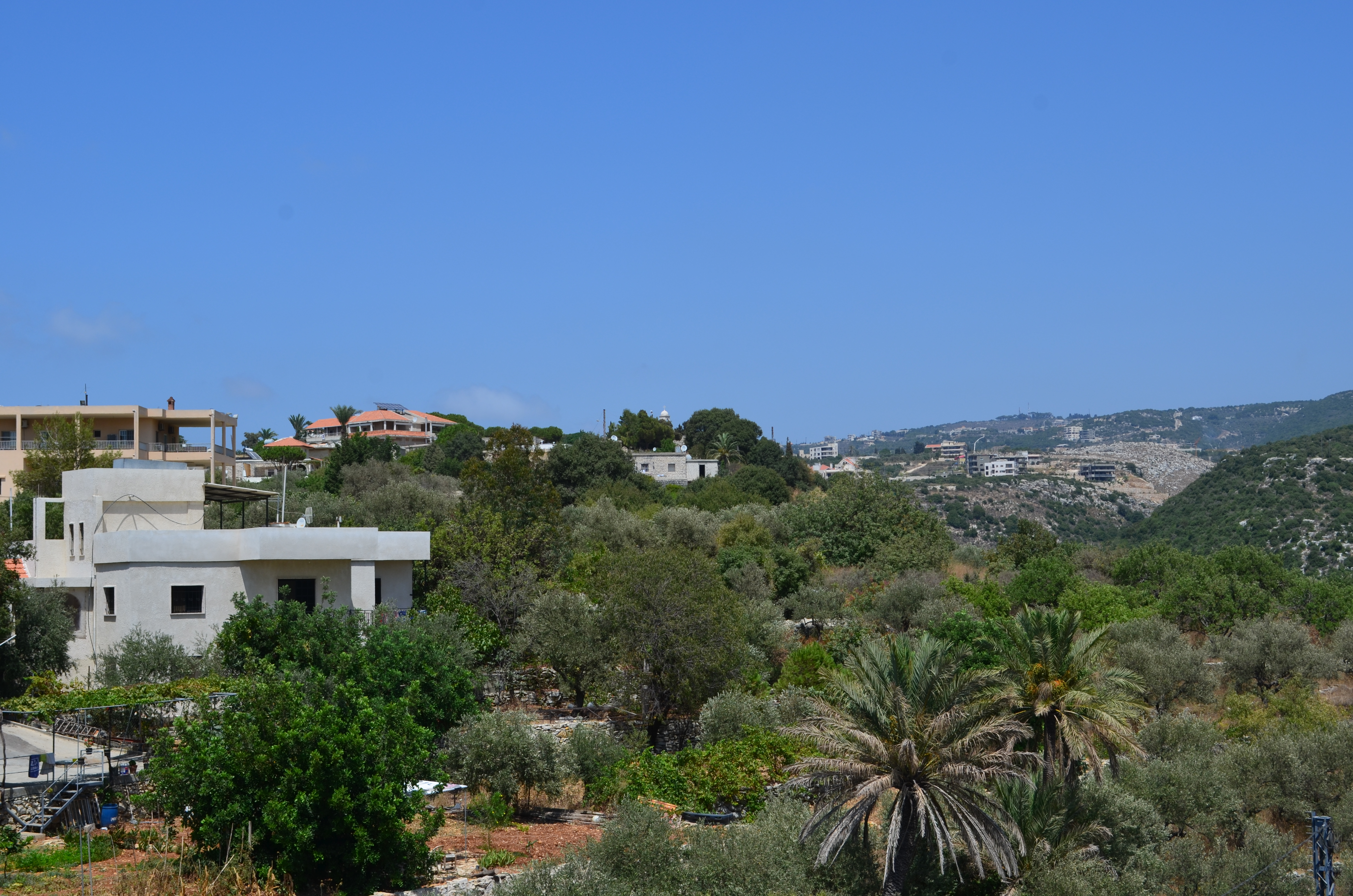
- Jeddayel hills

- Location within Lebanon
- Coordinates: 34°9′52″N 35°38′55″E
- Country: Lebanon
- Governorate: Keserwan-Jbeil
- District: Byblos

Government
  - Mayor: General George Doumet

Area
  - Total: 1.05 km^{2} (0.41 sq mi)
- Highest elevation: 220 m (720 ft)
- Lowest elevation: 0 m (0 ft)

Population
  - Total: 1,500
  - Density: 1,400/km^{2} (3,700/sq mi)
- Time zone: UTC+2 (EET)
  - Summer (DST): UTC+3 (EEST)
- Postal code: 1401
- Dialing code: +961 9 790 +961 9 791

Jeddayel (Arabic: جدايل; also spelled Geddayel or Jadayel) is a town in the Byblos District of the Keserwan-Jbeil Governorate, Lebanon. It is located 4 km north of Byblos. Its inhabitants are predominantly Greek Orthodox and Maronite Christians. Its population is about 1,500.

== Demographics ==
Jeddayel is located in a predominantly Christian Greek Orthodox area know locally as Qornet Al Rom, containing seven Christian Greek Orthodox towns: Mounsef, AlRihani, Jeddayel, Barbara, Chikhane, Gharzouz, and Hosrayel.

== Churches ==
There exist three churches in Jeddayel, because the martyr Dometius of Persia is the patron saint of a large part of the population. Two churches, a Maronite and another Greek Orthodox, are named Mar Doumit. The third church is in honour of Notre Dame.

== Events and festivals ==
'Mar Doumit feast day', and 'Summer goodbye' are yearly feasted in Jeddayel. Both events end by an open village dinner. Also, Christmas is widely celebrated in Jeddayel through Christmas decorations, special theater shows, and Papa Noël who makes personal appearances.

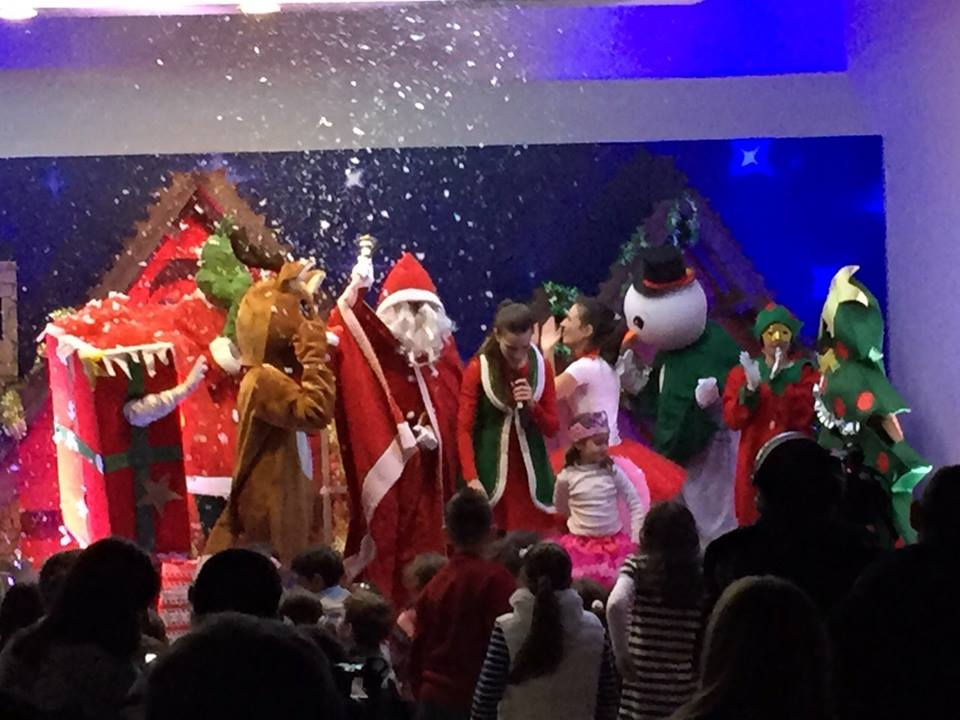
Christmas theater show organized yearly by the parishes of Jeddayel

== Municipality ==
There was no municipality in Jeddayel before 2016. In January 2016 town's residents called all concerned to take the appropriate measures to improve the security in the town. Accordingly many residents worked to establish a Municipality in Jeddayel to prevent and curb suspicious activities. In May 2016 town's resident elected Dr. Boutros Boulos as the first town mayor. See List of town without municipalities in Lebanon.

== Geography ==
The town is located on a hill overlooking the Mediterranean Sea. Its area is 2 km². It is surrounded by plantations of carobs, olive trees, and various vegetable crops. Thus several carob presses and olive oil mills are located within the village.

=== Climate ===
Jeddayel has a Mediterranean climate. The prevailing wind comes from the West-Southwest causes a maritime gateway and occasionally the advent of cloud cover. At night, land breeze rushes Wadi Jeddayel and brings to the region a relatively cold and slightly damp weather.

== Climate ==
Jeddayel has a Hot-summer mediterranean climate (Csa).

Climate data for Jeddayel
Month	Jan	Feb	Mar	Apr	May	Jun	Jul	Aug	Sep	Oct	Nov	Dec	Year
Mean daily maximum °C (°F)	16.1 (61.0)	16.6 (61.9)	18.4 (65.1)	21.7 (71.1)	25.4 (77.7)	28.5 (83.3)	30.5 (86.9)	31.1 (88.0)	29.5 (85.1)	26.7 (80.1)	22.6 (72.7)	18.3 (64.9)	23.8 (74.8)
Daily mean °C (°F)	12.6 (54.7)	13.0 (55.4)	14.4 (57.9)	17.3 (63.1)	20.8 (69.4)	24.0 (75.2)	26.0 (78.8)	26.7 (80.1)	25.1 (77.2)	22.4 (72.3)	18.4 (65.1)	14.6 (58.3)	19.6 (67.3)
Mean daily minimum °C (°F)	9.2 (48.6)	9.4 (48.9)	10.5 (50.9)	13.0 (55.4)	16.3 (61.3)	19.6 (67.3)	21.6 (70.9)	22.3 (72.1)	20.8 (69.4)	18.2 (64.8)	14.3 (57.7)	10.9 (51.6)	15.5 (59.9)
Average precipitation mm (inches)	226 (8.9)	188 (7.4)	139 (5.5)	59 (2.3)	22 (0.9)	1 (0.0)	1 (0.0)	1 (0.0)	10 (0.4)	45 (1.8)	123 (4.8)	191 (7.5)	1,006 (39.5)
Source: Climate-Data.org

== See also ==
- Catholic Church in Lebanon
