= Mechane, Lebanon =

Mechane مشان Mishan, Mchane
- Location in Lebanon
- Coordinates: 34°5′2″N 35°45′23″E
- Country: Lebanon
- Governorate: Keserwan-Jbeil
- District: Byblos

Area
  - Total: 2.08 km^{2} (0.80 sq mi)

Mechane (Arabic: مشان, also spelled Mishan) is a municipality in the Byblos District of Keserwan-Jbeil Governorate, Lebanon. Its inhabitants are predominantly Maronite Catholics and Shia Muslims. The town is the find spot of the Mishan inscription, carved in Ancient Greek on a statue base.

== Location ==
Mechane is situated in the Byblos district on the slopes overlooking the northern bank of the Nahr Ibrahim (Adonis River).

== History ==
In ancient time, the region was traversed by the pilgrimage route leading from Byblos to the sanctuary of Venus at Afqa. Mechane preserves remnants of antiquity, including rock-carved sarcophagi described by French orientalist Ernest Renan. Among these are the ruins of a temple-tomb, crowned by a pyramid, which are reminiscent of the so-called "Tombs of Adonis" that likely lined the mountain paths. Nearby, a sculpture, referred to as "Baal or Jupiter," was found around the nearby town of Mashnaqa. The Jesuit priest Joseph Delore and M.C.L. Brossé identified indistinct remains of an ancient structure in Mechane, along with engraved stones that were reused in the construction of a contemporary building. Excavations revealed also a funerary stela, and an Ionian capital dated to the Roman Imperial period (2nd or 3rd century AD).
