= Mghayreh =

Mghayreh مغيري Mughayri or Mughaireh
- Village
- Location in Lebanon
- Coordinates: 34°5′46″N 35°52′21″E
- Country: Lebanon
- Governorate: Keserwan-Jbeil
- District: Byblos

Area
  - Total: 2.63 km^{2} (1.02 sq mi)
- Elevation: 1,160 m (3,810 ft)

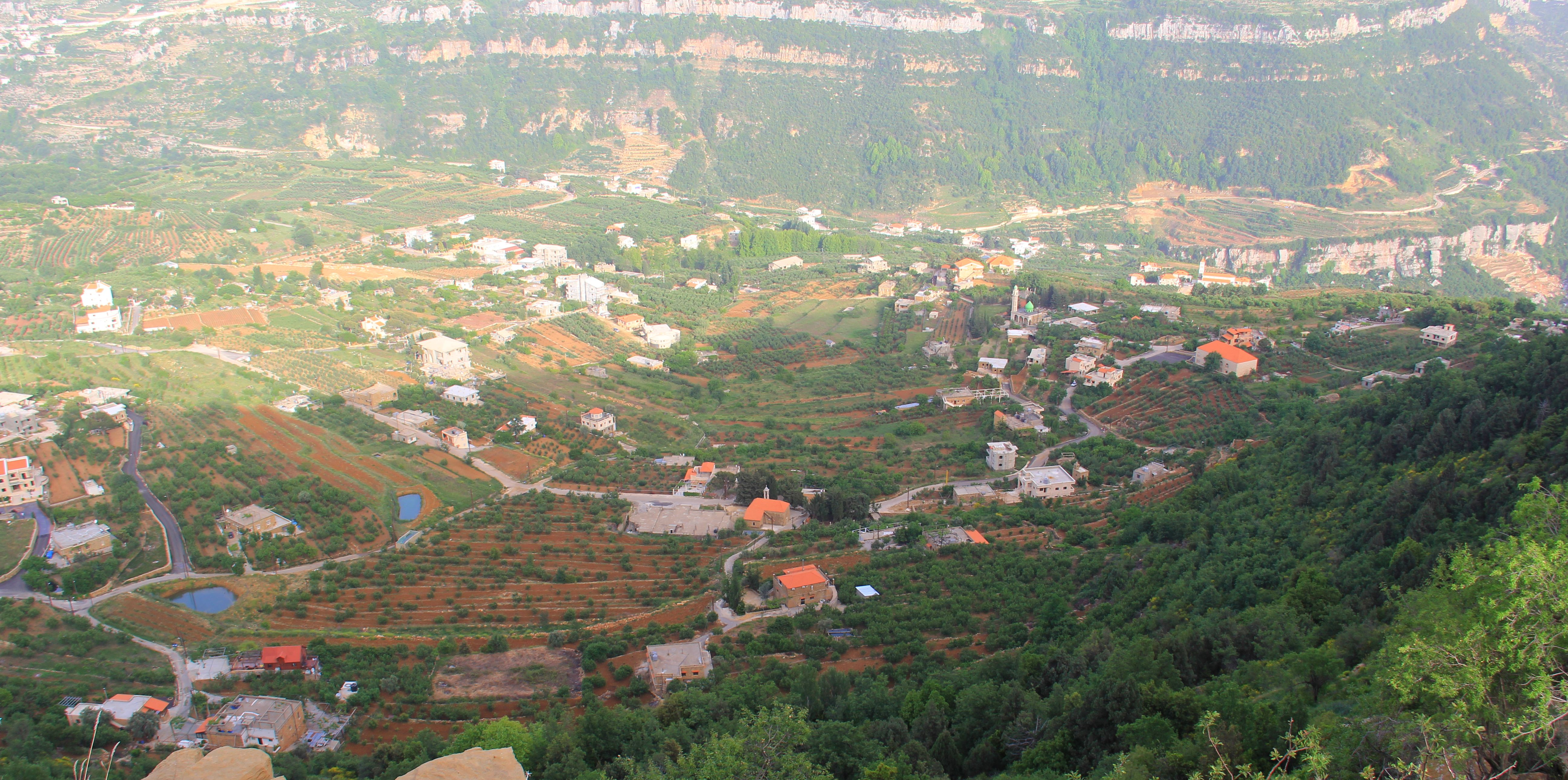
A general view of Mghayreh

Mghayreh (Arabic: مغيره, also spelled Mughaire, المغيري) is a municipality in the Byblos District of Keserwan-Jbeil Governorate, Lebanon. It is 82 kilometers north of Beirut. Mghayreh has an average elevation of 1,300 meters above sea level and a total land area of 263 hectares. Its inhabitants are predominantly Maronite Catholics and Shia Muslims. It's situated on the slopes of Joubbat El Mnaitra and is bordered by Aqoura to the south, Afqa to the west and Qartaba to the east.

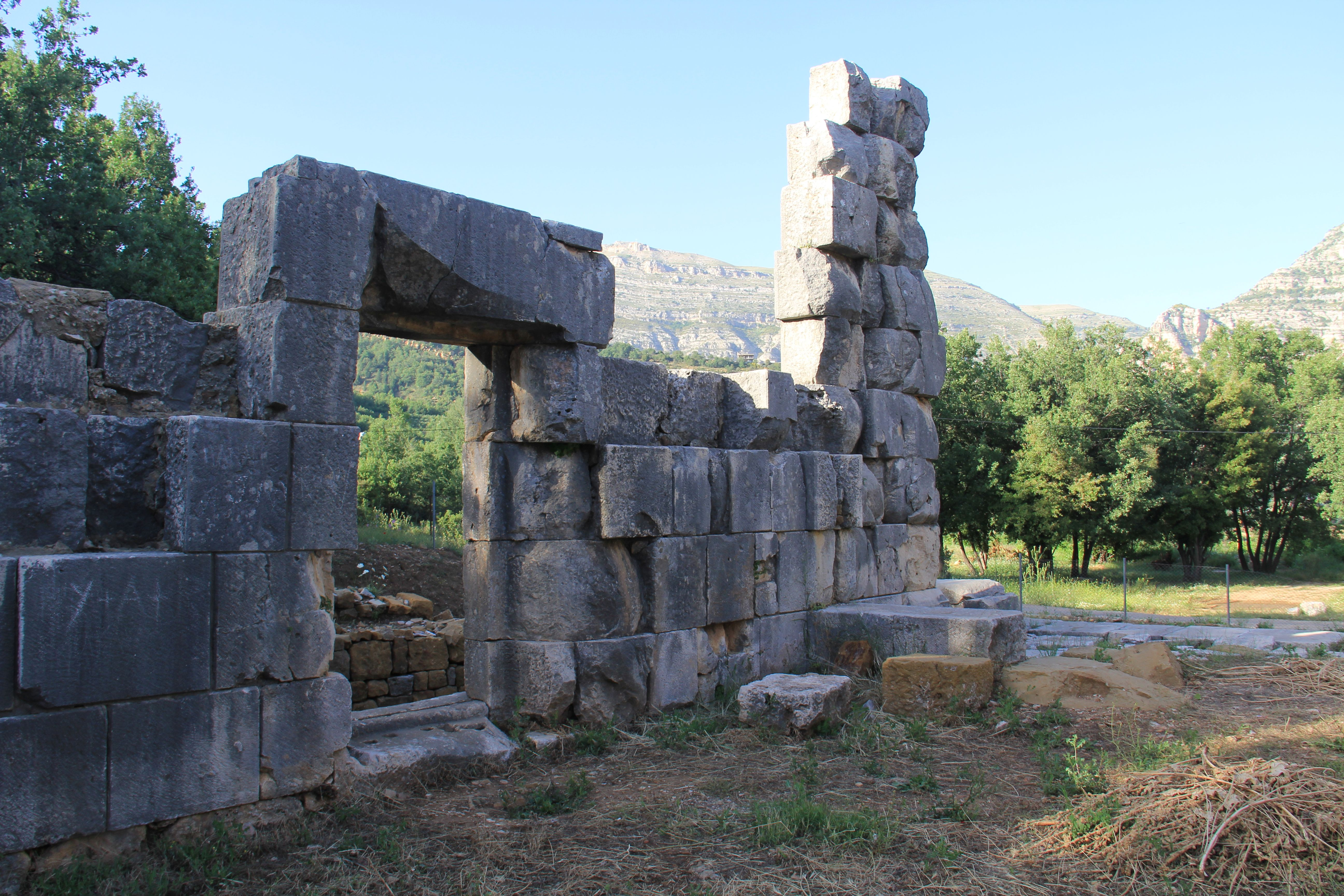
The great temple in Yanouh, locally known as Mar Girios al-Azrak (Saint George the Blue)

== History ==
Patriarch and 17th century historian Estephan El Douaihy mentions that the monastery of Saint-Jeries-el-Azzra became the seat of the Maronite Patriarchate in 939.

== Archaeology ==
Mghayreh's oldest ruins include Mar Girios al-Azraq (the 'blue convent'), a Roman temple, tentatively attributed to Astarte, built in the 2nd century AD. The visible parts of the temple art part of a greater sanctuary.

The town's Church of Our Lady of Yanouh dates back to the Crusader period.

== Agriculture ==
Mghayreh produces many varieties of apples thanks to its temperate summer climate. Varieties include the Golden and Starking apples. Other agricultural produces include apricot, plum, peach, pear, pomegranate and other fruits.
