= Yahchouch =

Yahchouch يحشوش
- Town
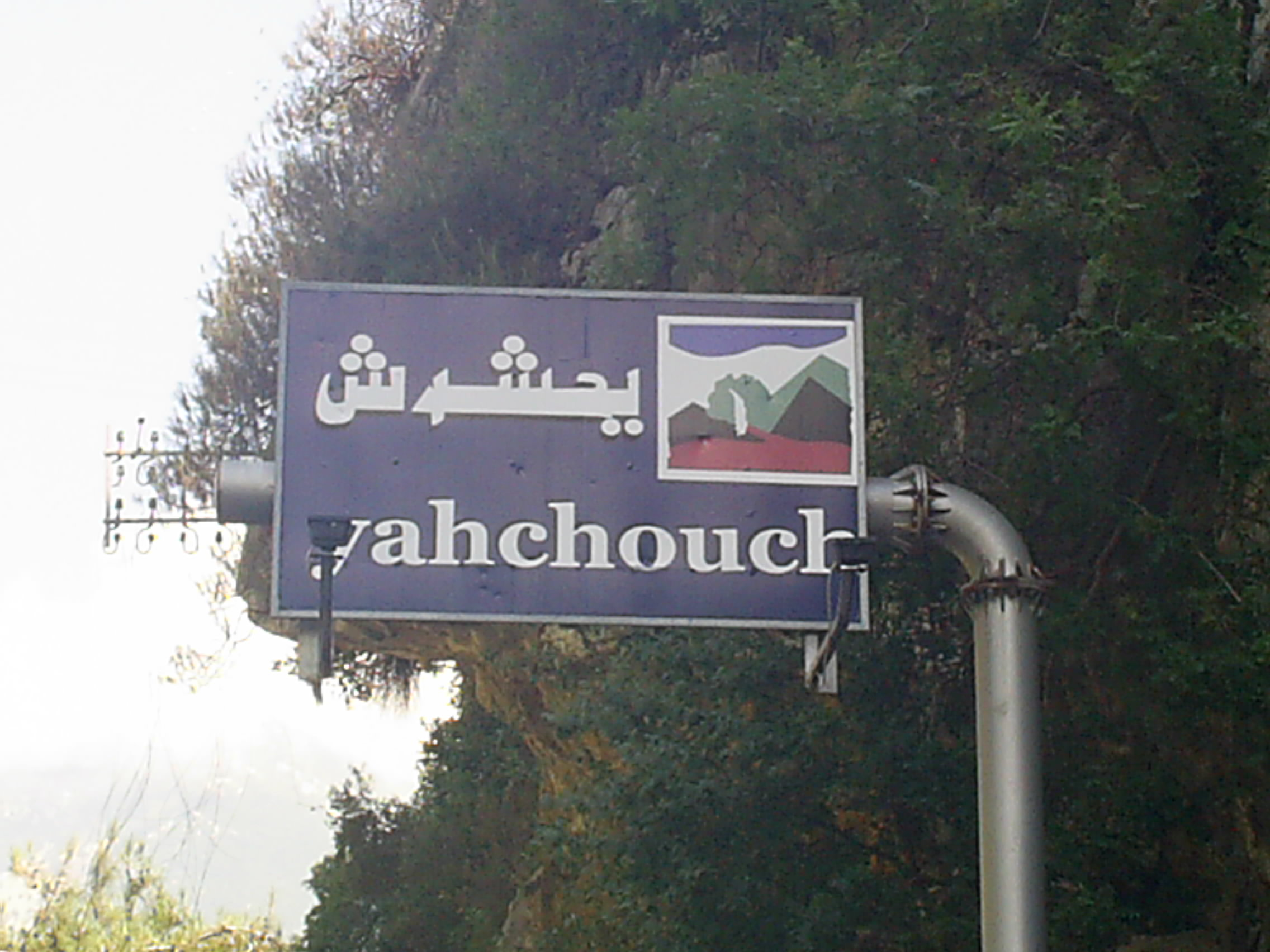

- Location within Lebanon
- Coordinates: 34°3′59″N 35°44′11″E
- Country: Lebanon
- Governorate: Keserwan-Jbeil
- District: Keserwan
- Time zone: UTC+2 (EET)
  - Summer (DST): UTC+3 (EEST)
- Dialing code: +961
- Website: http://www.yahchouch.org

Yahchouch (Arabic: يحشوش, romanized: Yaḥshūsh) is a municipality in the Keserwan District of the Keserwan-Jbeil Governorate in Lebanon. It is located 42 kilometers north of Beirut. Its average elevation is 670 meters above sea level and its total land area is 636 hectares. Yahchouch's inhabitants are predominantly Maronite Catholics and Christians from other denominations.

== Places of worship ==
The municipality has eight Maronite churches (St. Semaan, Wardieh, Saydet Ghoshraya, St. John, St. Takla, St. Therese, St. Bechara and Saydet Shouan) and several other Christian churches.

== Families ==
The Lebanese surname "Yahchouchi" derives from this village. The prominent families of the village are Mouawad, Keyrouz, Zouain, Turk, Assaf, Souaid, Bedrane, Barakat, Atallah, Akil, Tawil, Ghanem, El Jorr, Yahchouchi and others.

The Ghanem family is descended from Moussa Ghanem Al-Ghassani, a descendant of the Ghassanids, who were a Christian dynasty in the Levant under the aegis of the Byzantine Empire. Moussa came to Yanouh in the 9th century and settled there. Later, in 1121, some of his descendants moved to Lehfed. Finally, Sarkis Ghanem moved from Lehfed to Ftouh Keserwan during the 17th century and settled there.

== Etymology ==
The origin of the word would come from the Aramaic Syriac and means "the injured god" because the Syriac god Tammuz (also called Adonis in Greek mythology) died in the Ibrahim river which crosses the village of Yahchouch.

== Landmarks ==
Yahchouch is home to the Jabal Moussa reserve and to the Chouwen River.
