= Kfar Baal =

Kfar Baal كفر بعال Annaya
- Location in Lebanon
- Coordinates: 34°6′38″N 35°44′26″E
- Country: Lebanon
- Governorate: Keserwan-Jbeil
- District: Byblos

Area
  - Total: 303 ha (750 acres)
- Elevation: 920 m (3,020 ft)

Kfar Baal (Arabic: كفر بعال), also known as Annaya (Arabic: عنَايا) is a municipality in the Byblos District of Keserwan-Jbeil Governorate, Lebanon. It is 55 kilometers north of Beirut. Kfar Baal has an average elevation of 920 meters above sea level and a total land area of 303 hectares. There were six companies with more than five employees operating in the village as of 2008. Its inhabitants are predominantly Maronite Catholics.
