= Kfarhata (disambiguation) =

Kfarhata or Kfar Hata may refer to:

- Kfarhata, a Lebanese village located in the Koura District in the North Governorate
- Kfarhata Zgharta, a Lebanese village located in the Zgharta District in the North Governorate
- Kfar Hitta, a Lebanese village located in the Byblos District in the Mount Lebanon Governorate
- Kfar Hatta, a Lebanese village located in the Sidon District of the South Governorate
