= Fidar =

Fidar فدار
- Location in Lebanon
- Coordinates: 34°8′1″N 35°41′8″E
- Country: Lebanon
- Governorate: Keserwan-Jbeil
- District: Byblos

Area
  - Total: 390 ha (960 acres)
- Elevation: 920 m (3,020 ft)

Fidar (Arabic: فيدار, romanized: Fīdār) is a municipality in the Byblos District of Keserwan-Jbeil Governorate, Lebanon. It is 35 kilometers north of Beirut. Fidar has an average elevation of 100 meters above sea level and a total land area of 390 hectares. As of 2008, the village contained one public school with 206 students enrolled. Nassib Zgheib is the president of the municipality since 2019. This small village is also known for his 800-year-old church (kniset saïdet el doueir).
