= Fatreh =

Fatreh فتري Fatry
- Location in Lebanon
- Coordinates: 34°5′6″N 35°42′49″E
- Country: Lebanon
- Governorate: Keserwan-Jbeil
- District: Byblos

Area
  - Total: 2.94 km^{2} (1.14 sq mi)
- Elevation: 500 m (1,600 ft)

Fatreh (Arabic: فتري, also spelled Fatry) is a municipality in the Byblos District of Keserwan-Jbeil Governorate, Lebanon. It is 45 kilometers north of Beirut. Fatreh has an average elevation of 500 meters above sea level and a total land area of 294 hectares. Its inhabitants are predominantly Maronite Catholics.
