= Majdel el-Aqoura =

Majdel el-Aqoura مجدل العاقورة Majdel
- Location in Lebanon
- Coordinates: 34°6′21″N 35°53′51″E
- Country: Lebanon
- Governorate: Keserwan-Jbeil
- District: Byblos

Area
  - Total: 15.78 km^{2} (6.09 sq mi)
- Elevation: 1,220 m (4,000 ft)

Majdel el-Aqoura (Arabic: مجدل العاقورة), also known as Majdel (Arabic: مجدل) is a municipality in the Byblos District of Keserwan-Jbeil Governorate, Lebanon. It is 68 kilometers north of Beirut. Majdel el-Aqoura has an average elevation of 1,220 meters above sea level and a total land area of 1,578 hectares. Its inhabitants are predominantly Maronite Catholics, though it also contains a small Shia minority. As of 2022, the town had 1,380 registered voters (of whom 63 were diaspora voters).
