= Halat, Lebanon =

Halate حالات Halate
- Location in Lebanon
- Coordinates: 34°4′51″N 35°39′49″E
- Country: Lebanon
- Governorate: Keserwan-Jbeil
- District: Byblos

Area
  - Total: 9.57 km^{2} (3.69 sq mi)
- Elevation: 100 m (330 ft)

Halat (Arabic: حالات, romanized: Ḥālāt, also spelled Halate) is a municipality in the Byblos District of Keserwan-Jbeil Governorate, Lebanon. It is located along the Mediterranean coast, 32 kilometers north of Beirut. Its inhabitants are predominantly Maronite Catholics. Halat has an average elevation of 100 meters above sea level and a total land area of 957 hectares. The town has one public school, which had 112 students in 2008. There were 45 companies with more than five employees operating in Halat as of 2008. There is also a quarry in the town. Jad Bassil is the current Municipality President With Elias Daou as Deputy Mayor.

== Community ==
=== Churches ===
These are some of the churches in the town of Halat.

- Mar Youssef (Saint Joseph) in Beit el Boumeh
- Mar Gerges (Saint George)

== Geography ==
=== Neighborhoods ===
These are some of the neighborhoods in Halat.

- Beit el Boumeh
- Douweir
- Bahriyye (seaside)
- Hay el Bingo (Seaside)
- Zelehmayya
- Hay el Ghomeih
- Hakoura

=== Neighboring towns ===
These are the closest towns to Halat.

- Fidar to the north
- Byblos further to the north
- Nahr Ibrahim to the south
- Fatri to the east

=== Makhatir (مخاتير) ===
- Georges Rahi
- Zakhia Daou
- Christophe Mahfouz

== Climate ==
Halat's climate is typical for the Lebanese coast. Winters are cold and rainy. The temperature drops to 8C on the coldest days. In the winters, the temperature can rise to 20 C. The summers are hot and dry. It virtually never rains in the summer in Lebanon. The temperature in Halat can go up to 33 C in the summer. The weather is very pleasant and cool in the fall and spring with occasional rain.
