= Berbara, Byblos =

Berbara البربارة Al-Barbara
- Location in Lebanon
- Coordinates: 34°11′33″N 35°38′31″E
- Country: Lebanon
- Governorate: Keserwan-Jbeil
- District: Byblos

Government
  - Mayor: Ralph Nader

Area
  - Total: 3.14 km^{2} (1.21 sq mi)
- Elevation: 200 m (660 ft)

Berbara (Arabic: البربارة, also spelled al-Barbara) is a municipality in the Byblos District of Keserwan-Jbeil Governorate, Lebanon. It is located along the Mediterranean coast, 48 kilometers north of Beirut. Berbara has an average elevation of 200 meters above sea level and a total land area of 314 hectares. Its inhabitants are predominantly Maronite and Greek Orthodox Christians.

In October 2026, a small-scale electric train was launched in this town, operating on a section of the previously abandoned Lebanese railway network.
