= Kfar Kidde =

Coordinates: 34°12′10″N 35°39′16″E

Kfar Kidde, Kafr Kiddah, or Kfar Kiddé كفر كدّه
- Town
- Interactive map of Kfar Kidde, Kafr Kiddah, or Kfar Kiddé
- Country: Lebanon
- Governorate: Keserwan-Jbeil
- District: Byblos
- Elevation: 232 m (761 ft)

Population (1996)
  - Total: 20,000+
- Time zone: +2

Kfar Kidde (Arabic: كفر كدّه) is a town in Northern Lebanon, roughly 51 km North of Beirut. It is in the Byblos District of Keserwan-Jbeil Governorate, located along the Mediterranean coast.
