= Hbaline =

Village in Keserwan-Jbeil, Lebanon

Hbaline حبالين
- Village
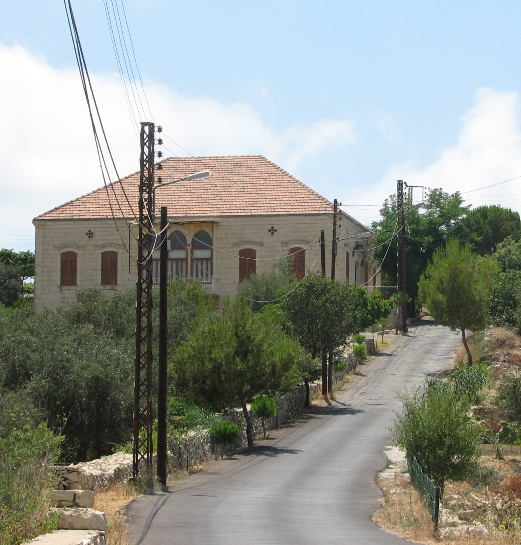
- Entrance of village

- Location within Lebanon
- Coordinates: 34°9′35″N 35°41′7″E
- Country: Lebanon
- Governorate: Keserwan-Jbeil
- District: Byblos District
- Elevation: 540 m (1,770 ft)
- Time zone: UTC+2 (EET)
  - Summer (DST): UTC+3 (EEST)
- Dialing code: +961

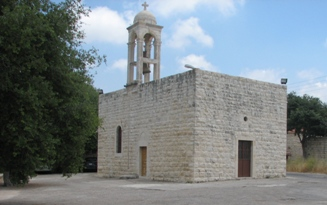
Notre Dame de la Délivrance, Hbaline

Hbaline (Arabic: حبالين, romanized: Ḥbālīn) is a small village in Byblos-Lebanon located 44 km north of Beirut and at an altitude of 540 meters, just above Amsheet and Gherfine and before BeitHabbak. Hbaline is located on a small hill. Its eastern side overlooks the Mediterranean Sea.

== History ==
- Other names include Habbalin, Habbālīn, Hbālīn, Hbêlîne, Hebline, Hbaline, Habalin, Hbaleen, Habālīn, Hbeline, Hbalîne, Hbaïline.
- The Nader family's presence in Habline dates from 1516 when their ancestor Hajj Khalil established himself.
- In 1516, following the Marj Dabek battle when the Ottomans defeated the Mamluks and invaded Lebanon and Syria, Hajj Khalil with his two brothers Hajj Younane and Hbeich fled from Deir el Ahmar to seek refuge in Yanouh (The Hajj title was given to Christians who had completed a pilgrimage to Jerusalem).
- From Yanouh, Hbeich went to Ghazir in the Keserwan District where he served the emirs and got rewarded with the Sheikh title, while Younane went to a village called Edde near Byblos and named himself after the village in order to hide his original identity fearing conflict with the Shia tribes present in the Byblos area. Hajj Khalil moved to the outskirts of Hbaline where he established a farm, his descendants then moved to Hbaline.
- Two families in the village of Arbaniyeh (Baabda District) trace their Ancestry to Hbaline. The Aoun and Asmar families left Hbalin sometimes in the early 17th century. The Asmar, Hbeich and Edde families are said to have been one family which originally inhabited the village of Deir el Ahmar.

== Demography ==
- There are 161 inhabitants in the village.
- The inhabitants are Maronite Christians.
- Some part of the population has emigrated to Latin America. Many has left in the 20th century to Ecuador such as Abi Youssef, Issa, Farhat and Mansour family’s.

== Churches ==
- There are three chapels in the village:
  - Sainte Sophie, a small chapel located downhill in the eastern part of the village.
  - Notre Dame de la Délivrance, a small church which can host 80 persons, located in the central square of the village. It dates from the beginning of the 19th century. One can notice its small entrance doors which are typical of churches in the area. These were designed to prevent Ottoman cavaliers from bursting inside with their horses.
- The priest responsible for the Hbaline Churches is Father Joseph Khoury.
- [saint Elie] church
