= Bejjeh =

Bejjeh بجه
- Location in Lebanon
- Coordinates: 34°10′50″N 35°42′54″E
- Country: Lebanon
- Governorate: Keserwan-Jbeil
- District: Byblos

Area
  - Total: 5.02 km^{2} (1.94 sq mi)
- Elevation: 560 m (1,840 ft)

Bejjeh (Arabic: بجه) is a municipality in the Byblos District of Keserwan-Jbeil Governorate, Lebanon. It is 54 kilometers north of Beirut. Bejjeh has an average elevation of 560 meters above sea level and a total land area of 502 hectares. There were four companies with more than five employees operating in the village as of 2008. Its inhabitants are predominantly Maronite Catholics.

Olive oil and arak are produced locally, and figs and grapes are grown. Slogans include "The two thirds of the country" (ثلثين البلاد), "the center of the world" (نص الكون), "heart of the mountain" (قلب الجبل).
