= Ain el-Ghouaybeh =

Ain el-Ghoubayeh عين الغويبة Ayn al-Ghubayah
- Location in Lebanon
- Coordinates: 34°4′52″N 35°51′29″E
- Country: Lebanon
- Governorate: Keserwan-Jbeil
- District: Byblos

Area
  - Total: 0.64 km^{2} (0.25 sq mi)
- Elevation: 800 m (2,600 ft)

Ain el-Ghoubayeh (Arabic: عين الغويبة, also spelled Ayn al-Ghubayah) is a mountainous village in the Byblos District of Keserwan-Jbeil Governorate, Lebanon. It is 82 kilometers north of Beirut. Ain el-Ghoubayeh has an average elevation of 800 meters above sea level and a total land area of 64 hectares. Its inhabitants are predominantly Shia Muslims.
