= Hsoun =

Hsoun الحصون
- Location in Lebanon
- Coordinates: 34°5′34″N 35°44′11″E
- Country: Lebanon
- Governorate: Keserwan-Jbeil
- District: Byblos

Area
  - Total: 3.26 km^{2} (1.26 sq mi)
- Elevation: 916 m (3,005 ft)

Hsoun (Arabic: الحصون, romanized: al-Ḥṣūn, also spelled el-Houssoun) is a municipality in the Byblos District of Keserwan-Jbeil Governorate, Lebanon. It is 73 kilometers north of Beirut. Bejjeh has an average elevation of 916 meters above sea level and a total land area of 326 hectares. There were four companies with more than five employees operating in the village as of 2008. Its inhabitants are predominantly Maronite Catholics and Shia Muslims.
