= Ras Osta =

Ras Osta راس اسطا
- Location in Lebanon
- Coordinates: 34°6′54″N 35°43′24″E
- Country: Lebanon
- Governorate: Keserwan-Jbeil
- District: Byblos

Area
  - Total: 4.29 km^{2} (1.66 sq mi)
- Elevation: 900 m (3,000 ft)

Ras Osta (Arabic: راس اسطا, romanized: Rās Āsṭā, also spelled Ras Usta) is a municipality in the Byblos District of Keserwan-Jbeil Governorate, Lebanon. It is 55 kilometers north of Beirut. Ras Osta has an average elevation of 900 meters above sea level and a total land area of 429 hectares. There were two companies with more than five employees operating in the village as of 2008. Its inhabitants are predominantly Shia Muslims.
