= Mazraat es-Siyad =

Mazraat es-Siyad ܕܝܪܐ ܥܘܙܐ | مزرعة السياد
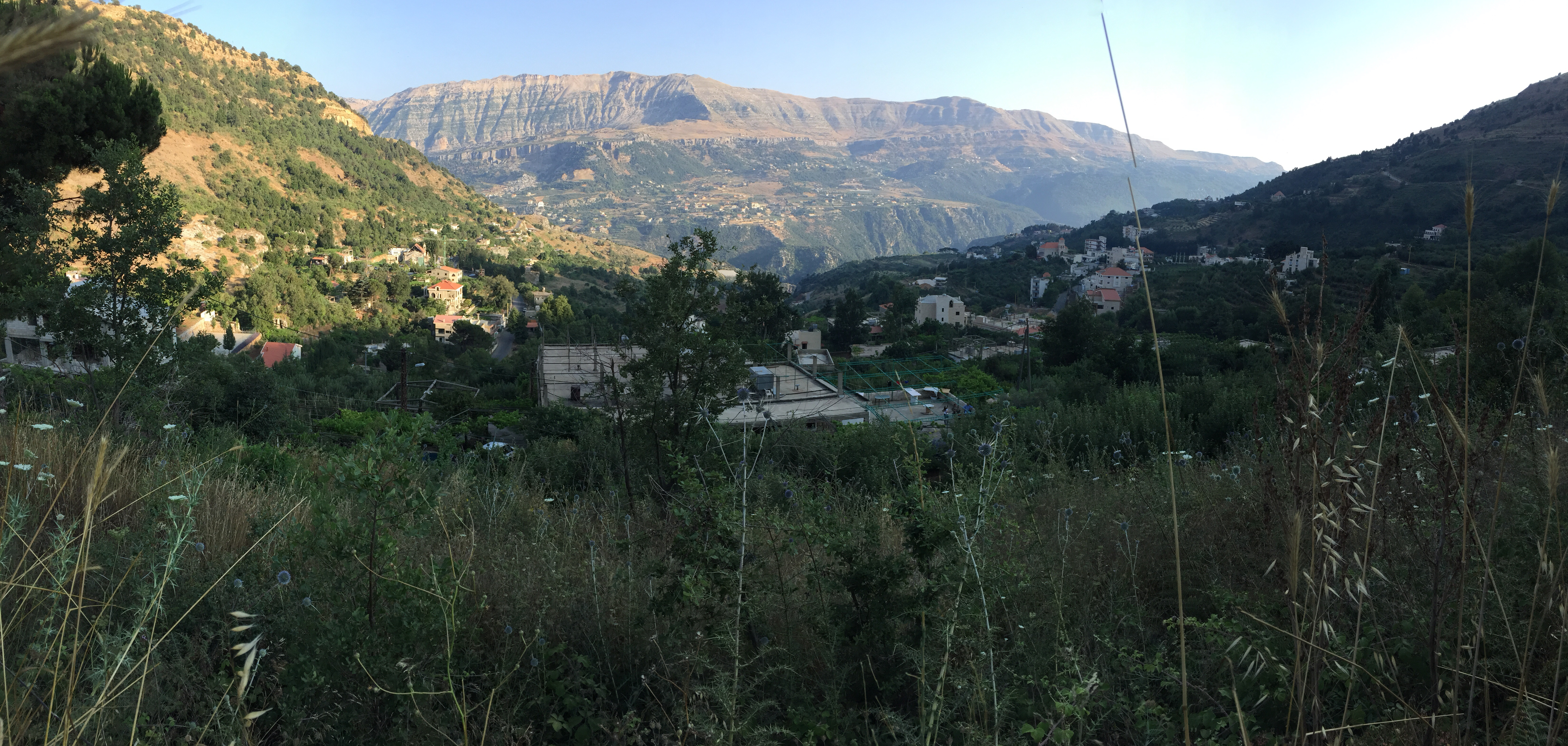
- Interactive map of Mazraat es-Siyad
- Location in Lebanon
- Coordinates: 34°6′15″N 35°51′35″E
- Country: Lebanon
- Governorate: Keserwan-Jbeil
- District: Byblos

Government
  - Mayor: Serge Tanios Bou Gharios

Area
  - Total: 7.91 km^{2} (3.05 sq mi)
- Highest elevation: 1,250 m (4,100 ft)
- Time zone: UTC+2 (EET)
  - Summer (DST): UTC+3 (EEST)

Mazraat es-Siyad (Arabic: مزرعة السياد; also transliterated Mazraet al-Siyad, Mazraet el-Siyed, pronounced [Mazraʿat Essiyyèd]) is a village and municipality in the highlands of the Byblos District in the Keserwan-Jbeil Governorate, Lebanon. The town is 58 kilometres (36 mi) away from Beirut, and stands at an elevation of 1,250 m (4,100 ft) above sea level.

== History ==
The area where the village stands was known as Deir ʿaouza (Arabic: دير عوزه, Syriac: ܕܝܪܐ ܥܘܙܐ, romanized: Dīrā ʿOzā), meaning “The Highest Monastery” or "Monastery of Strength" in reference to the village’s ancient Maronite monastery situated high up in the mountainous village.

During the Mamluk era (13th–15th century), local chieftain Sheikh Nawfal Ibrahim El-Khoury bestowed the ruins of the monastery to an ancestor of Al-Husseini family, Sayyid Hussein al-Husseini. Al-Husseini is said to be the first person to reside in the abandoned area after he had restored the monastery. The village is mentioned in Tannus al-Shidiaq's 1859 Akhbar al-aʿyan fi Jabal Lubnan (The History of the Notables in Mount Lebanon) as part of the Muqataʿaof Jebbet al-Mnaitra in the Muʿamala of Tripoli, a then subdivision of Mount Lebanon. (Note: During the early Ottoman period, Lebanon was divided into two districts, or mu'amalat: the Mu’amalat of Tripoli, which extended from the borders of Tripoli to the Mu’amalatayn with its capital in Jbeil and was part of the Eyalet of Tripoli; and the Mu’amalat extending from the Mu’amalatayn to the Awali River in the south, with its capital in Deir al-Qamar, which belonged to the Eyalet of Sidon.) During the Mutasarrifate era (1861–1918), the village was administratively part of the Mnaitra mudiriyah, within the kaza of Kesserwan.

== Location ==
Mazraat es-Siyyad is located in the Byblos District (Jbeil) in the Mount Lebanon Governorate. It is 58 kilometers north of the capital Beirut. It spans an area of 6.65 square kilometres (2.57 sq mi) and stands at a mean elevation of 1,250 m (4,100 ft) above sea level. The municipal area of Mazraat es-Siyad includes the hamlets of Abboud, Mazraat er-Rmeileh, and Sharbineh.

== Etymology ==
Mazraat es-Siyad translates to "Farm of the Siyad" from Arabic, in reference to Siyyad an attribute of the al-Husseini family. The Siyad (Masters) are Shia Muslims recognized as descendants of the prophet Muhammad through his grandsons, Hasan and Husayn ibn Ali. The hamlet of Abboud is named after Abboud Gharios Ouais, a forefather of the Gharios family, and Mazraat er-Rmeileh is so named after the nature of the terrain which is composed of sandstone.

== Demographics ==
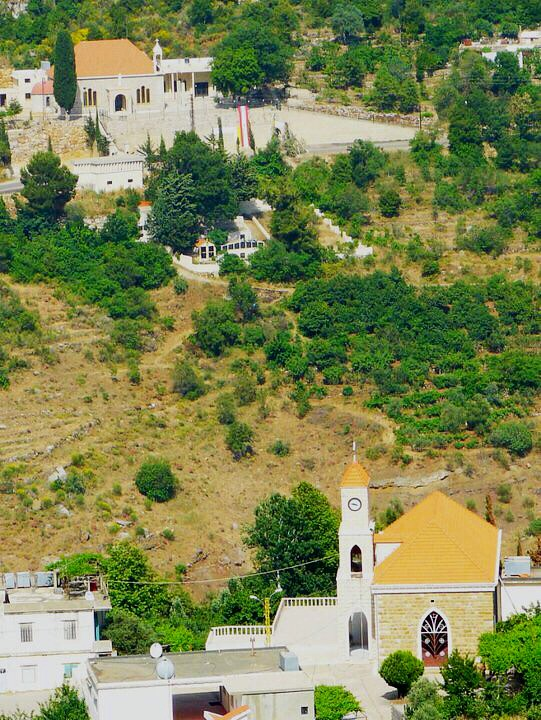
Saint Abdas and Our Lady churches in 2016

The population lives in a total of 220 houses in the town. There were 1,250 voters from Mazraat es-Siyad registered in 2005. The population is predominantly Maronite and Shia. The largest families in order of size according to the 2014 election records are Al-Husseini, Karkaba, Gharios, Obeid, Acar, Zaarour, Barakat, Bou Salman, Karam, Ziadé, Medawar, and El-Khoury.

== Government ==
Mazraat es-Siyad municipality was established in 2004. The municipal council currently has twelve members. In addition to the municipal council, Mazraat es-Siyad has a three-member mayoral council headed by a mukhtar (headman).

== Economy ==
Agriculture, namely pomology is the main economic activity in the Byblos highlands. Mazraet es-Siyad has many natural water sources, fertile soil and arable land. Residents also depend on permanent jobs, as there are 15 small commercial and industrial companies, in addition to two hotels, the Shangri-La and the Monte Carlo.

== Landmarks ==
Mazraet es-Siyad has numerous ancient archaeological relics, such as the remains of old vernacular houses, rock cut wine presses, and historical religious buildings. The town's main sites are Mar Abda (Saint Abdas) Church, a Maronite church founded in 1708 by the Gharios family. Mar Abda was significantly expanded during later centuries. The Mazra’at As-Siyyad Mosque, a historical Shia Muslim mosque built in line with a decision by Mutasarrıf Wasa Pasha (ruled 1883–1892). Saydet an-Najat (Our Lady of Salvation), the town's second Maronite Church. The two churches are located at the opposite sides of the glen that bisects the town.

=== El-Mathkoube cave ===
El-Mathkoube (مغارة المَثقوبة, 'The Perforated Cave') is a natural cavern located at an altitude of 1,690 m (5,540 ft) above sea level in the upper reaches of the town. Its name describes its unique feature—a large opening in its ceiling, approximately 15 m (49 ft) high. This hole allows snow to accumulate inside the cave, where it persists for extended periods, often lasting until the summer months. Historically, locals made use of this natural refrigeration. The cave attracts mountain climbers and hiking enthusiasts, and is occasionally used as a shelter for livestock.

== Culture ==
=== Festivities ===
Mazraat es-Siyad celebrates the Feast of the Lady of Salvation (Saydet an-Najat) on 8 September, and Saint Abdas (Mar Abda) on 31 August with traditional dinners and festivities.

== Notable residents ==
- Ahmad al-Husseini, Minister of Public Works in 1928, and Lebanese parliament deputy elected in 1932.

== Gallery ==
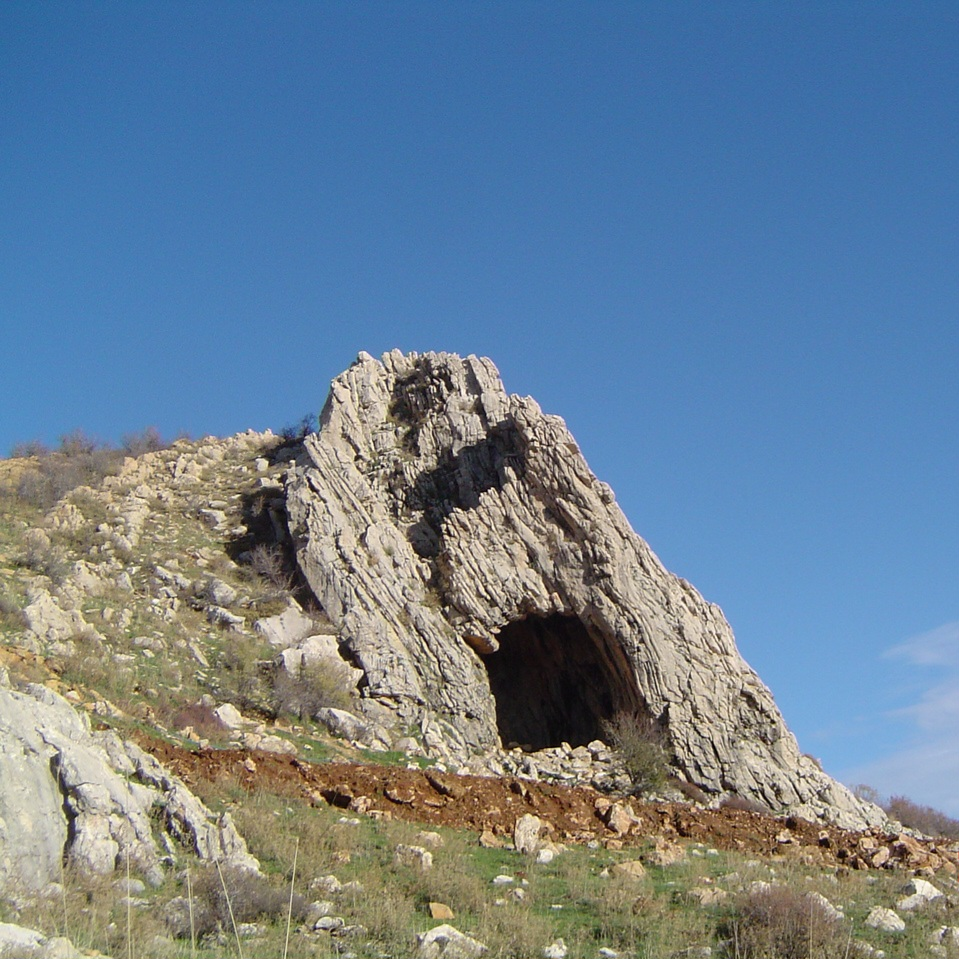
El-Mathkoube cave

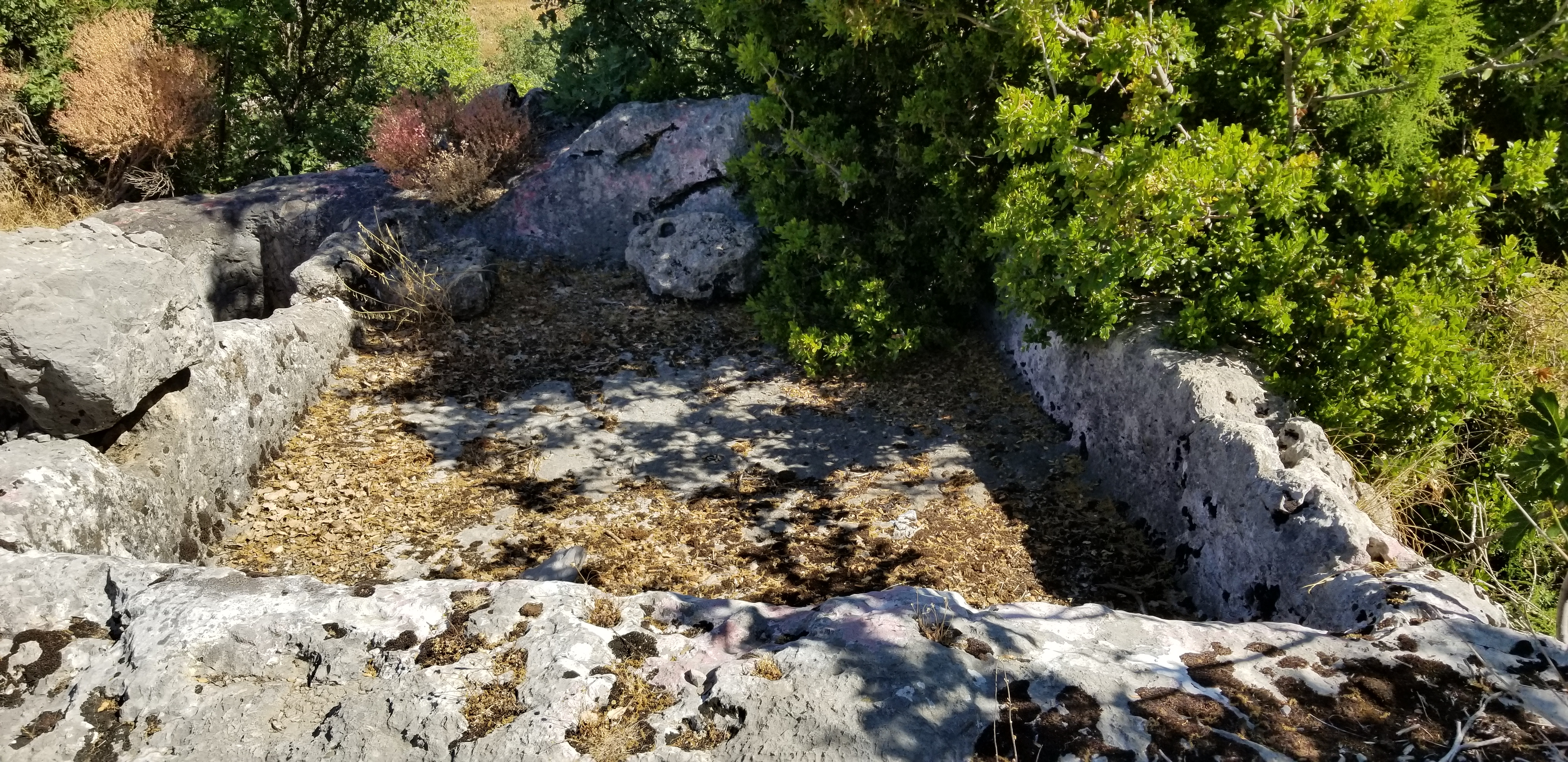
Ancient rock-cut vat used in wine pressing

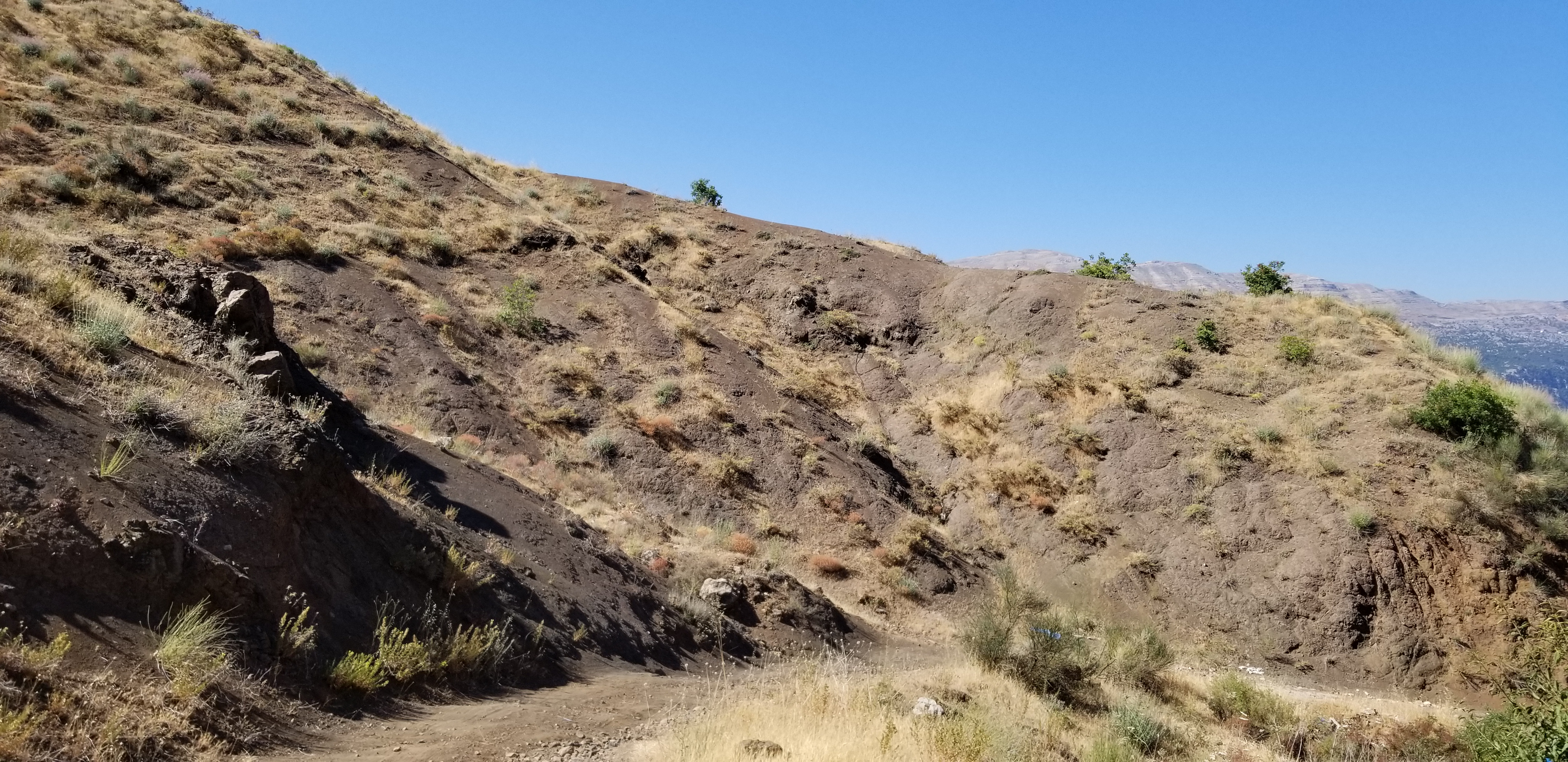
Walking trail bordering Iron ore-rich hillside
