= Mish Mish, Byblos =

Mish Mish مشمش Michmich, Mech Mech
- Location in Lebanon
- Coordinates: 34°8′44″N 35°46′50″E
- Country: Lebanon
- Governorate: Keserwan-Jbeil
- District: Byblos

Area
  - Total: 1,471 ha (3,630 acres)
- Elevation: 1,200 m (3,900 ft)

Mish Mish (Arabic: مشمش, also spelled Michmich) is a municipality in the Byblos District of Keserwan-Jbeil Governorate, Lebanon. It is 60 kilometers north of Beirut. Mish Mish has an average elevation of 1,200 meters above sea level and a total land area of 1,471 hectares. Its inhabitants are predominantly Maronite Catholics.
