= Mounsef =

Mounsef المنصف El-Mounsif
- Location in Lebanon
- Coordinates: 34°10′51″N 35°38′41″E
- Country: Lebanon
- Governorate: Keserwan-Jbeil
- District: Byblos
- Established: 1550
- Founder: Georges El Khoury

Area
  - Total: 3.41 km^{2} (1.32 sq mi)
- Elevation: 220 m (720 ft)

Mounsef (Arabic: المنصف, also spelled al-Mounsif) is a municipality in the Byblos District of Keserwan-Jbeil Governorate, Lebanon. It located off the Mediterranean coast and is 47 kilometers north of Beirut. Mounsef has an average elevation of 220 meters above sea level and a total land area of 341 hectares. Its inhabitants are predominantly Greek Orthodox Christians.
