= Kfar Hitta =

Kfar Hitta كفر حتى
- Village
- Location in Lebanon
- Coordinates: 34°8′16″N 35°40′33″E
- Country: Lebanon
- Governorate: Keserwan-Jbeil
- District: Byblos
- Time zone: UTC+2 (EET)
  - Summer (DST): +3

Kfar Hitta (Arabic: كفر حتى) is a village located in the Byblos District in the Keserwan-Jbeil Governorate in Lebanon.
