= Beithabbak =

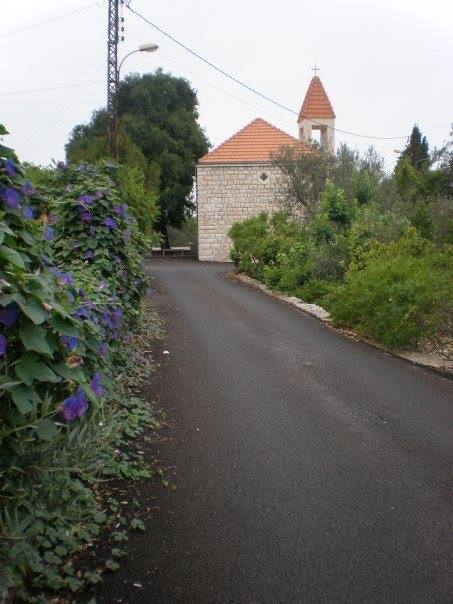

- Location within Lebanon
- Coordinates: 34°9′50″N 35°42′31″E
- Country: Lebanon
- Governorate: Keserwan-Jbeil
- District: Byblos District

Beithabbak (English: Beithhabak) is a small village in the district of Byblos in Lebanon. It is located on a small hill, 11 kilometres (6.8 mi) northwest from Byblos at an altitude of 540 metres (1,770 ft).

== Demography ==
There are 310 inhabitants in the village. The inhabitants are Maronite Christians.

== Schools ==
There is one school in the village, the Missionary Sisters of the Very Holy Sacrament school.
