= Byblos District =

Coordinates: 34°07′25″N 35°39′04″E

- District
- قضاء جبيل
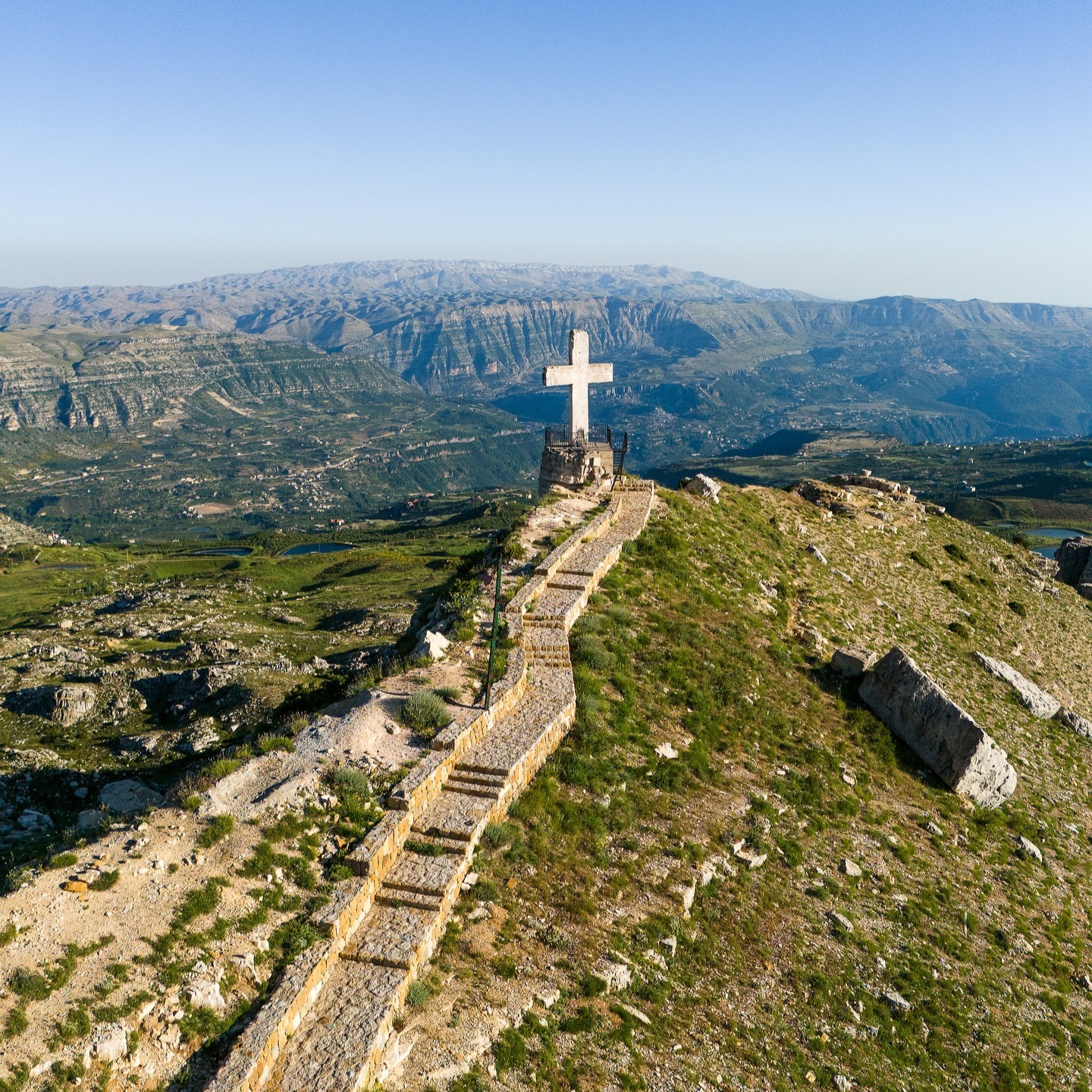
- Aaqoura

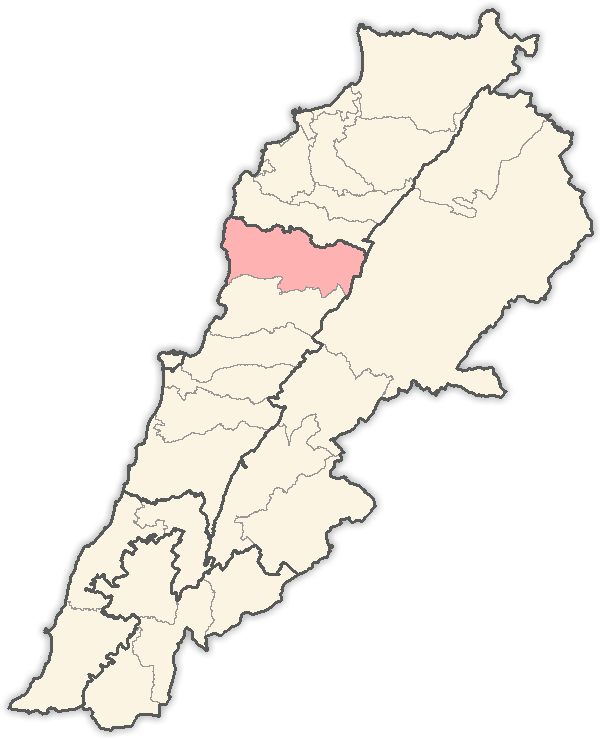
- Country: Lebanon
- Governorate: Keserwan-Jbeil
- Capital: Byblos

Area
  - Total: 430 km^{2} (170 sq mi)
- Highest elevation: 2,150 m (7,050 ft)
- Lowest elevation: 0 m (0 ft)

Population
  - Estimate (31 December 2017): 99,388
- Time zone: UTC+2 (EET)
  - Summer (DST): UTC+3 (EEST)

Byblos District (Arabic: قضاء جبيل; transliteration: Qadaa' Jbeil), also called the Jbeil District (Jbeil is Lebanese Arabic for "Byblos"; standard Arabic Jubail), is a district (qadaa) of the Keserwan-Jbeil Governorate of Lebanon. It is located to the northeast of Lebanon's capital Beirut. The capital is Byblos. The rivers of al-Madfoun and Nahr Ibrahim form the district's natural northern and southern borders respectively, with the Mediterranean Sea bordering it from the west and Mount Lebanon from the east, separating it from the adjacent district of Baalbek in the Beqaa Valley.

== Demographics ==
The district's population is predominantly Maronite Catholic, followed by a Shia Muslim minority community. The largest towns of the district are predominantly inhabited by Maronites; notably Byblos, Qartaba, Aqoura and Amsheet. Most Shia Muslims live in the villages of Almat, Ras Osta, Hjoula and Bichtlida, and in the jurd highlands of Lassa, Afqa and Mazraat es-Siyad. A Greek Orthodox minority forms part of the population and is spread among several villages know locally as qornet el-roum (the corner of the Greek Orthodox). The villages that make up qournet el-roum are Mounsef, Jeddayel, Bekhaaz, Berbara, Gharzouz, Rihanneh and Chikhane.

According to registered voters in 2014:

Year	Christians						Muslims			Druze
Year	Total	Maronites	Greek Orthodox	Greek Catholics	Armenian Orthodox	Other Christians	Total	Shias	Sunnis	Druze
2014	76.39%	67.46%	4.56%	1.88%	1.31%	1.18%	23.12%	19.78%	3.34%	0.01%
2018	76.33%	67.03%	4.54%	1.89%	1.22%	1.65%	23.64%	20.25%	3.39%	0.01%
2022	76.31%	67.27%	4.65%	1.63%	0.96%	1.80%	23.69%	20.97%	2.72%	0.00%
2026	74.76%	70.13%	3.02%	—N/a	—N/a	1.61%	25.24%	22.47%	2.77%	0.00%

Number of registered voters (21+ years old) over the years.

Years	Men	Women	Total	Growth (%)
2009	38,708	36,877	75,585	—N/a
2010	39,032 ▲	37,115 ▲	76,147 ▲	+0.74% ▲
2011	38,898 ▼	37,106 ▼	76,004 ▼	-0.19% ▼
2012	39,348 ▲	37,545 ▲	76,893 ▲	+1.16% ▲
2013	39,932 ▲	37,968 ▲	77,900 ▲	+1.29% ▲
2014	40,393 ▲	38,430 ▲	78,823 ▲	+1.17% ▼
2015	40,816 ▲	38,839 ▲	79,655 ▲	+1.04% ▼
2016	41,205 ▲	39,429 ▲	80,634 ▲	+1.21% ▲
2017	41,630 ▲	39,864 ▲	81,494 ▲	+1.06% ▼
2018	42,211 ▲	40,289 ▲	82,500 ▲	+1.22% ▲
2019	42,619 ▲	40,658 ▲	83,277 ▲	+0.93% ▼
2020	43,059 ▲	41,043 ▲	84,102 ▲	+0.98% ▲
2021	43,423 ▲	41,327 ▲	84,750 ▲	+0.76% ▼
2022	43,965 ▲	41,719 ▲	85,684 ▲	+1.09% ▲
2023	44,114 ▲	41,889 ▲	86,003 ▲	+0.37% ▼
2024	44,490 ▲	42,159 ▲	86,649 ▲	+0.75% ▲
2025	44,676 ▲	42,447 ▲	87,123 ▲	+0.54% ▼
2026	—N/a	—N/a	87,820 ▲	+0.79% ▲
Source: DGCS

=== Electoral constituency ===
Byblos District has three seats allocated to it in the Lebanese Parliament. Two of these seats are allocated to Maronite Catholics, while the other seat is allocated to Shia Muslims.

== Landmarks and sights ==
The Byblos District rises from 0 to 2,300 meters above sea level in the north. "Jabal el-Mnaitra" is also in the district, and said to have an altitude of 2,911/2,807 meters above sea level, but this isn't confirmed. Moreover, The District hosts a number of significant sites. The capital Byblos is an important historical and archaeological site boasting Phoenician, Roman, and Crusader ruins. The mountain village of Aannaya hosts the Saint Maroun-Aannaya monastery and the Catholic shrine of Saint Charbel (1828-1898), the first Lebanese saint (officially canonized by Pope Paul VI in 1977), both significant religious Maronite Christian holy sites. The village of Laqlouq, which has an altitude of 1,750 meters to 2,000 meters, is a ski resort. The village of Afqa contains the Afqa grotto, which is the source of the Nahr Ibrahim, also known as the Adonis River. The village of Bentaël (also spelled Bintaael) contains the first protected area in Lebanon, established in 1981. The village of Jaj hosts surviving cedar trees from the ancient cedar forests from which cedar wood was exported to Egypt and later to Jerusalem. The village Chikhane is considered the birthplace of the first Russian school in the Middle East, believed to have been established during World War I. The village of Hjoula is among the very rare villages in Lebanon to contain fossilized sea animals in it, along the village of Haqel. Byblos District also has a notable beach life with many public and private resorts existing along the seaside.

== Towns and villages ==
List and location of the 98 towns and villages in the Byblos district:

- 01 Fghal
- 02 Kfar Kiddeh
- 03 Chmout
- 04 Berbara
- 05 Maad
- 06 Bekhaaz
- 07 Ain Kfaa
- 08 Mayfouq
- 09 Bejjeh
- 10 Mounsef
- 11 Gharzouz
- 12 Al Kattara
- 13 El Kharbeh
- 14 Tartej
- 15 Ghalboun
- 16 Chikhan
- 17 Hsarat and Richkif
- 18 Haqel
- 19 Rihaneh
- 20 Chamat
- 21 Ramout
- 22 Lehfed
- 23 Obeidat
- 24 Hosrayel
- 25 Jeddayel
- 26 Beithabbak
- 27 Sakiet el Kheit
- 28 Jaj
- 29 Hbaline
- 30 Ghorfine
- 31 Kfoun
- 32 Kafr and El Harf
- 33 Arab El Haib
- 34 Saki Rechmaya
- 35 Habil
- 36 Behdidat
- 37 Kfar Mashoun and Dmalsa
- 38 Amsheet
- 39 Birket Hjoula
- 40 Kfar Hitta
- 41 Mish Mish
- 42 Bentaël (Fdar El Soufla)
- 43 Edde
- 44 Laqlouq
- 45 Hjoula
- 46 Bichtlida
- 47 Hboub
- 48 Ehmej
- 49 Byblos
- 50 Kfar Qouas
- 51 litij
- 52 Mehrin
- 53 Brayj
- 54 Aqoura
- 55 Ras Osta
- 56 Mazraat es-Siyad
- 57 Kfar Baal (Annaya)
- 58 Jlisseh
- 59 Sirin
- 60 Qartaboun
- 61 Almat el-Chmaliyeh
- 62 Blat
- 63 Tourzaiya
- 64 Mghayreh
- 65 Almat el-Jnoubiyeh
- 66 Tedmor and Serghal
- 67 Mastita
- 68 Jouret El Qattine
- 69 Bchilleh
- 70 Ferhet
- 71 Fidar
- 72 Yanouh
- 73 Deir Mar Sarkis
- 74 Zebdin
- 75 Bazyoun
- 76 Souaneh
- 77 Balhoss
- 78 Hsoun
- 79 Qartaba
- 80 Hedayne
- 81 Alita
- 82 Ain ed-Delbeh
- 83 Halat
- 84 Frat
- 85 Fatreh and Bir-el-Haït
- 86 Majdel
- 87 Seraaita
- 88 Ain Jrain
- 89 Ain el-Ghouaybeh
- 90 Mechane
- 91 Adonis and Sannour
- 92 Janneh
- 93 Ghabat
- 94 Qorqraiya
- 95 Lassa
- 96 Nahr Ibrahim
- 97 Afqa
- 98 Qahmez
