= Qahmez =

Village in Lebanon

Qahmez قهمز
- Village
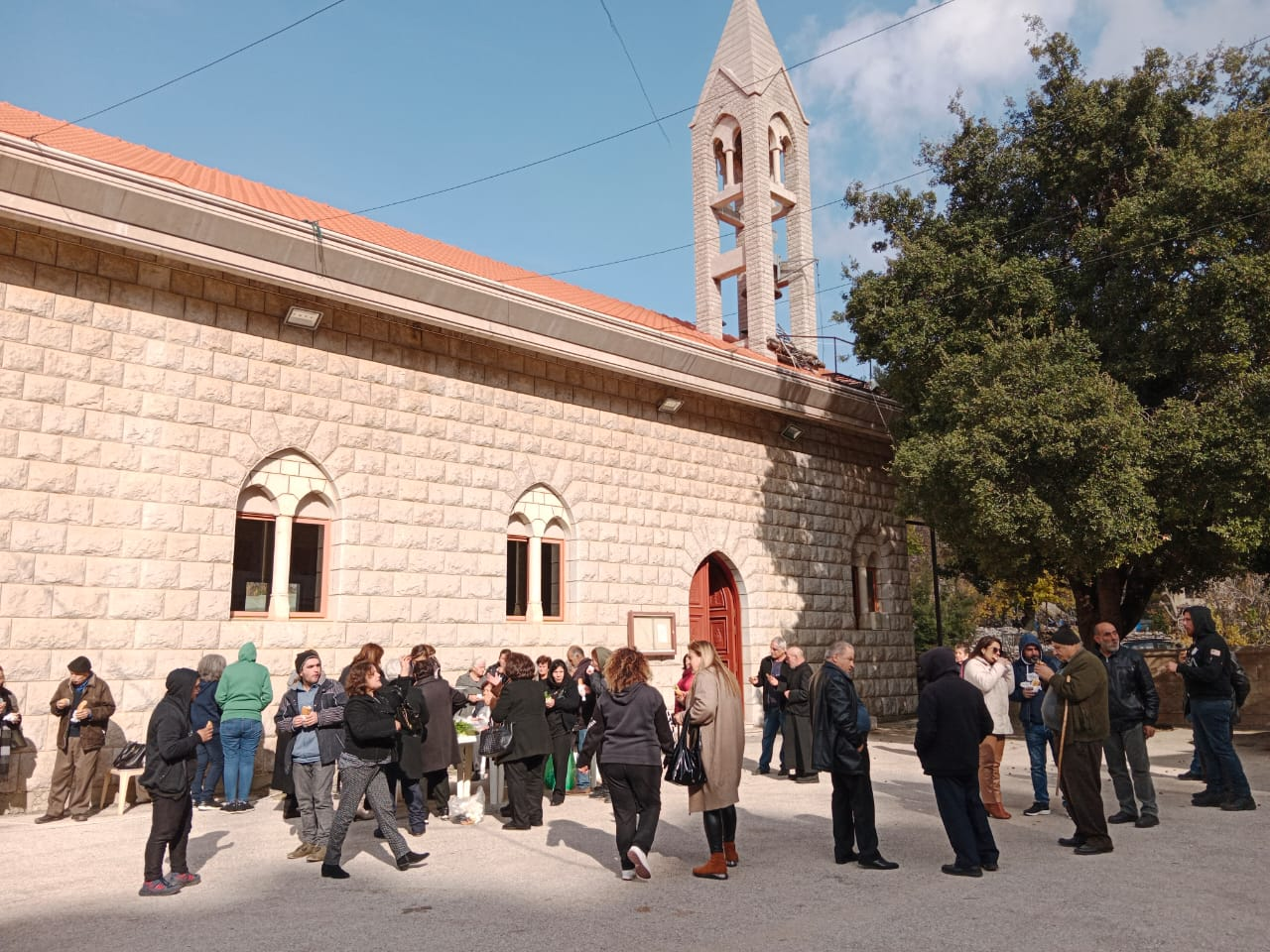
- Our Lady Of The Rosary Church

- Location in Lebanon
- Coordinates: 34°3′56″N 35°48′11″E
- Country: Lebanon
- Governorate: Keserwan-Jbeil
- District: Byblos

Government
  - Mokhtar: Georges Zeidan Khoueiry

Area
  - Total: 12.53 km^{2} (4.84 sq mi)
- Highest elevation: 1,800 m (5,900 ft)
- Lowest elevation: 700 m (2,300 ft)
- Time zone: UTC+2 (EET)
  - Summer (DST): UTC+3 (EEST)
- Dialing code: +961

Qahmez (Arabic: قهمز, also spelled Qehmez, Kahmez or Amez) is a village with no municipality located in the Jurd area of the district of Byblos of the Keserwan-Jbeil Governorate in central Lebanon. It is located 50 kilometers northeast of Beirut. Its elevation ranges between 700 and 1800 meters above sea level and its total land area consists of 1,253 hectares.

The village is home for the Jabal Moussa Biosphere Reserve. The reserve maintains an entrance at Baydar-al-shawk, Qahmez.

== Etymology ==
The name "Qahmez" most likely descends from "Kamaz - قمز", which in Lebanese dialect refers to jumping, that is because traversing the challenging terrain of Qahmez demands a certain level of agility, as navigating through its rugged landscape often necessitates skillful "leaps". The region's distinct topography, characterized by its rough and uneven terrain, presents a unique challenge for those journeying across it.

== Demographics ==
Its population included 832 registered voters in 2014. Nevertheless, Qahmez lacks a municipality, and it is headed only by a Mukhtar. Its current Mukhtar is "George Zeidan Khoueiry". The entirety of its community is Maronite Christians.

== Economy ==
Qehmez is known for its agricultural output, primarily centered around the cultivation of tomatoes and apples (as well as grapes, cherries, and other fruits and vegetables).

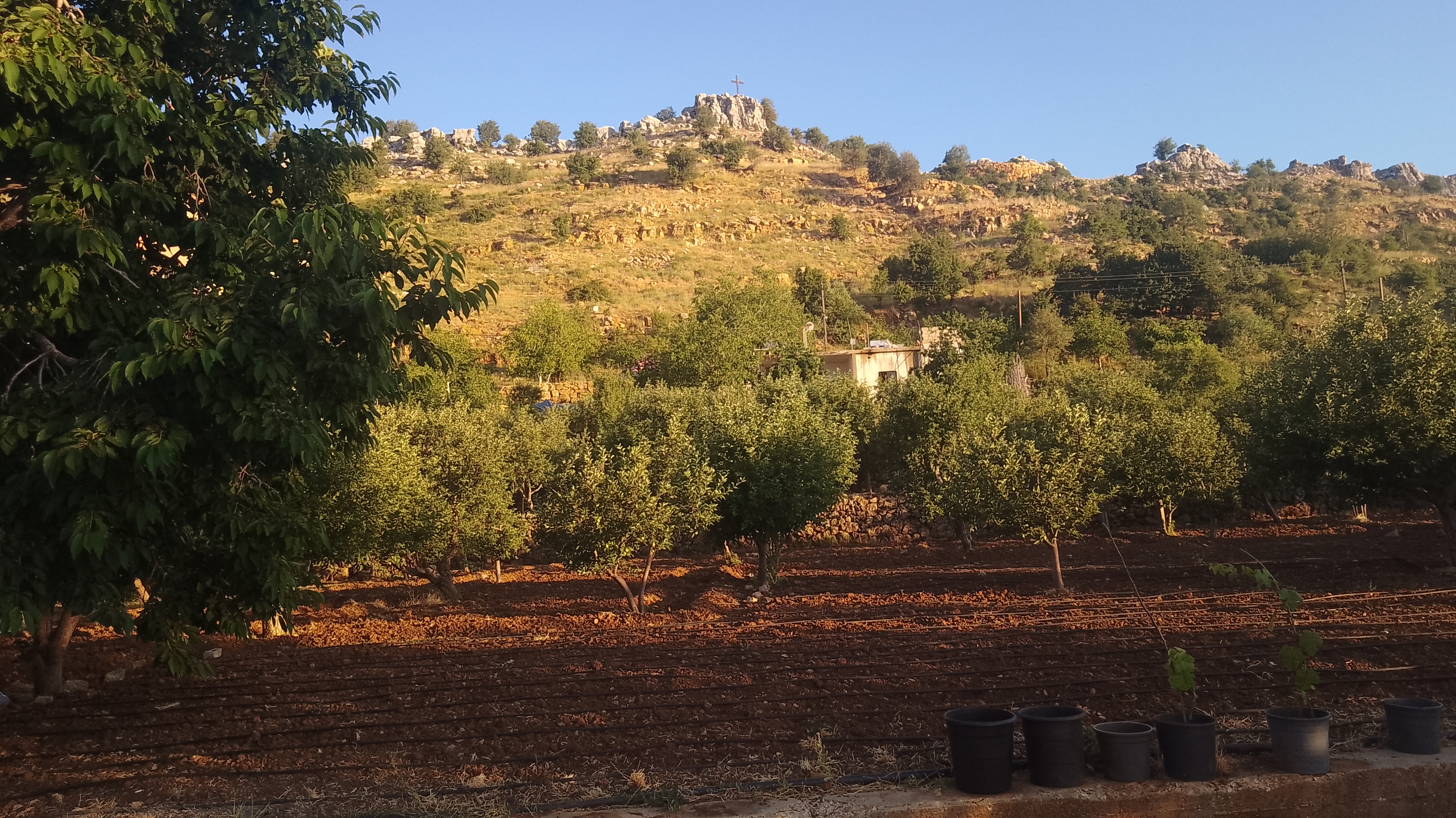

== Environmental importance ==
Notably, Qahmez holds a significant position within the Jabal Moussa Biosphere Reserve and has been officially designated, being part of the reserve, as a globally recognized Important Bird Area. This recognition aims to preserve and protect the diverse migratory bird populations that frequent the region during their journeys.

== Farik Al Wardiya ==
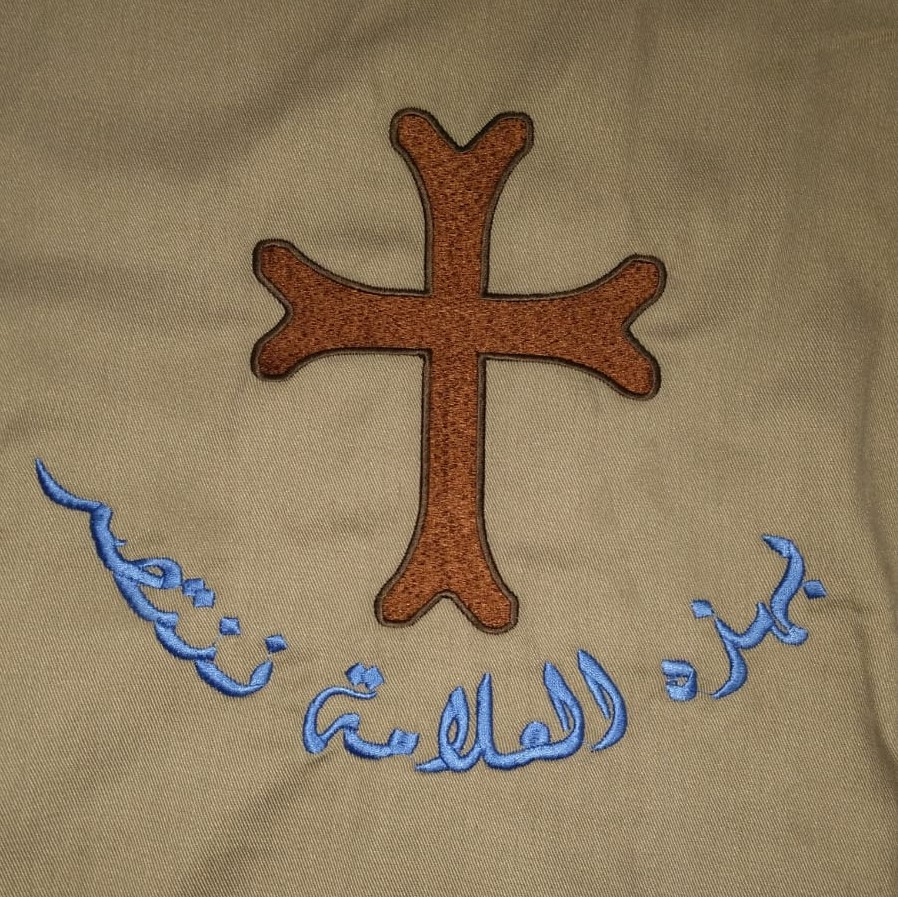
Symbol of the cross on the back of Farik al wardiya 's uniform.

Qahmez is predominantly Christian Maronite. Under these circumstances, 'Farik al wardiya al rasouli' (Arabic: فريق الوردية الرسولي; 'Rosary missionary group'), a Maronite missionary group which mission consists of helping children in need across Lebanon, as well as spreading the Christian mindset and worldview across local neighboring villages, was founded by Najat Khoueiry in Qahmez.

== Sites to visit ==
- Our Lady of The Rosary Church - Qahmez
- Nab' al Hadid (a water spring in the furthest mountains of Qahmez)
- Jabal Moussa Biosphere Reserve
- Old ruins dating back to the Roman times (al-Tahoon, the abandoned monastery of Saint Doumit, etc.)
