= Lassa, Lebanon =

Lassa لاسا
- Location in Lebanon
- Coordinates: 34°4′34″N 35°51′36″E
- Country: Lebanon
- Governorate: Keserwan-Jbeil
- District: Byblos

Area
  - Total: 7.39 km^{2} (2.85 sq mi)
- Elevation: 1,130 m (3,710 ft)

Lassa (Arabic: لاسا) is a municipality in the Byblos District of Keserwan-Jbeil Governorate, Lebanon. It is 90 kilometers north of Beirut. Lassa has an average elevation of 1,130 meters above sea level and a total land area of 739 hectares. The village contains one public school, which enrolled 15 students in 2008. Its inhabitants are predominantly Shia Muslims with a Maronite minority.

== History ==
Lassa was burnt by the Ottomans many times in reprisal for the Hamadeh lords' failure to remit tax incomes. In the late 18th century, the Hamadeh and most of their allied clans were driven out of Lassa and Mount Lebanon to the Beqaa Valley.

The village of Lassa has been at the center of a controversy over property ownership and development, revolving around the Maronite Church's claim to two-thirds of the village's 3 million square meters of land. Tensions escalated when the Miqdad family began construction on this contested land, sparking condemnation from the Church and allegations from politicians aligned with the March 14 Alliance that Hezbollah was behind the actions, with one MTV reporter calling it the establishment of "the republic of the dahieh in Lasa". This event raised concerns about Hezbollah's oppressive influence spreading into traditionally Christian areas.
