= Aqoura =

Aaqoura عاقورة- عاقورا Aaqoura
- Village
- Nickname: Queen of jroud
- Location in Lebanon
- Coordinates: 34°7′11″N 35°54′12″E
- Country: Lebanon
- Governorate: Keserwan-Jbeil
- District: Jbeil

Area
  - Total: 140 km^{2} (54 sq mi)
- Elevation: 1,450 m (4,760 ft)

Aaqoura (Arabic: عاقورا او عاقورة, also spelled "Akoura") is a mountainous village in the Byblos District of Keserwan-Jbeil Governorate, Lebanon, 68 kilometers north of Beirut. Aaqoura has an average elevation of 1,600 meters above sea level (between 1000 and 2189 m) and a total land area of around 140 square kilometers and it has 14 villages around its borders. It is the largest town by land size in Mount Lebanon and the second largest in Lebanon. By voting power, it is the third largest town in the Jbeil District after the city of Jbeil Byblos and Qartaba.

== Demographics ==
=== Religion ===
As of 2022, the religious make-up of the town's 4,152 registered voters were roughly 92.3% Maronite Catholics, 3.1% Greek Orthodox, 2.4% Greek Catholic, 0.8% Christian Minorities, and 1.4% others.

1. Maronite Catholics (92.3%)
2. Greek Orthodox (3.10%)
3. Greek Catholic (2.40%)
4. Christian Minorities (0.80%)
5. Others (1.40%)
