= Ghabat =

Al Ghabat الغابات
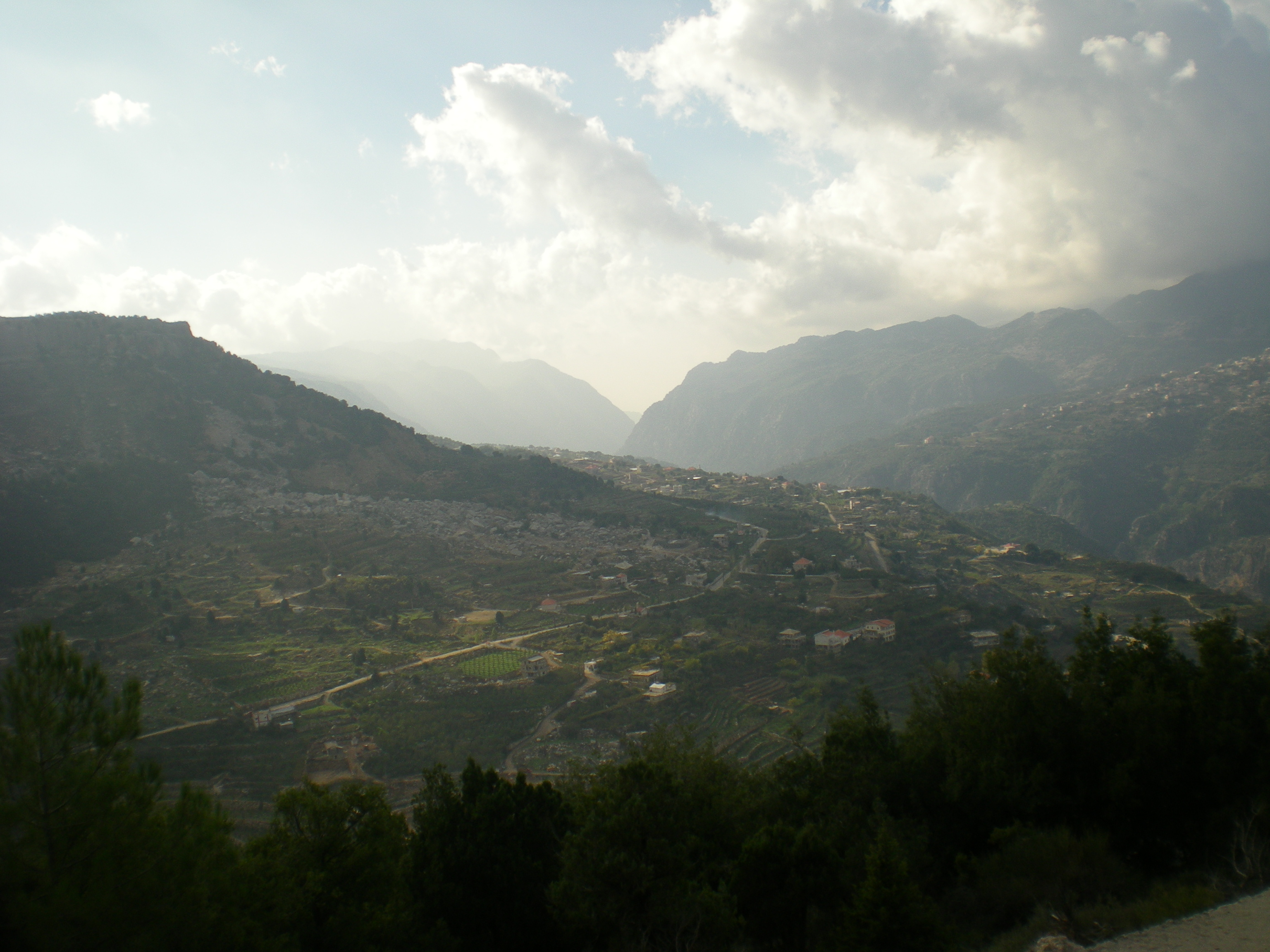
- Interactive map of Al Ghabat
- Coordinates: 34.0803°N 35.8735°E
- Country: Lebanon
- District: Byblos District

Government
  - President of municipality: Bechara Philippe Karkafi
- Highest elevation: 1,300 m (4,300 ft)
- Lowest elevation: 1,000 m (3,300 ft)

Population
  - Total: 600

Ghabat or Al-Ghabat (Arabic: الغابات, romanized: al-Ghābāt) is a village in Lebanon located in the Jurd area of the district of Byblos in the Mount Lebanon region, about 74 kilometres northeast of Beirut. Its inhabitants are predominantly Maronite Catholics.

Al Ghabat has a dry-summer subtropical Mediterranean climate with moderate weather throughout the seasons. Summers are hot and dry, while winters are rainy with occasional snow. It is located on the mountains above Byblos at an altitude of 1000 to 1200 metres. It is surrounded by the villages of Afqa and Lassa and is home to 591 people registered on the electoral list.

== Economy ==
Al Ghabat's main industry is agriculture. The town mainly produces apples, peaches, grapes and vegetables.

== History ==
The name means forests in Syriac. It could also mean imprisonment, pressure, strain. In Arabic it means a dense forest. The biggest resident family is the Karkafi family and its origin dates back to the 19th century when Nassar Gemayel left Bikfaya to a location named Karkafi, next to Lassa village in the Byblos caza and later settled in Al Ghabat.

== Sites to visit ==
- St. John Maroon parish church
- The ruins and remains of old constructions situated in the Shawiya area.

Ghabat is known mainly for:

- Its abundant water (potable and for irrigation).
- The towering mountains surrounding it (in the Shawiya).
- Its location at the mouth of the steep Nahr Ibrahim river valley.

== Demographics ==
Ghabat's inhabitants are predominantly Maronite Catholics. The major families of the village are Karkafi, Rahi, Karam, Hatem and Khoueiry.

The first municipal council was elected in 2010. Its current president is Bechara Philippe Karkafi.

== Institutions ==
- Municipal Council
- Mayor Council
- Agricultural Cooperative.

== Notable people ==
- Rima Bechara Philip Karkafi, a former television presenter on Lebanese Broadcasting Corporation International LBCI, married to politician Suleiman Frangieh, Jr. She is the founder and president of Al Midan a non-governmental, non-profit organization, organizing annual cultural and international festival Ehdeniyat.
- Bechara Maurice Karkafi, the general director of the bureau of Land Management & Cadastre in the Ministry of Finance (Lebanon). He is a member of the executive council of the Maronite League. He is the father-in-law of Hadi Hobeiche.
