= Laqlouq =

Laqlouq لقلوق Laklouk
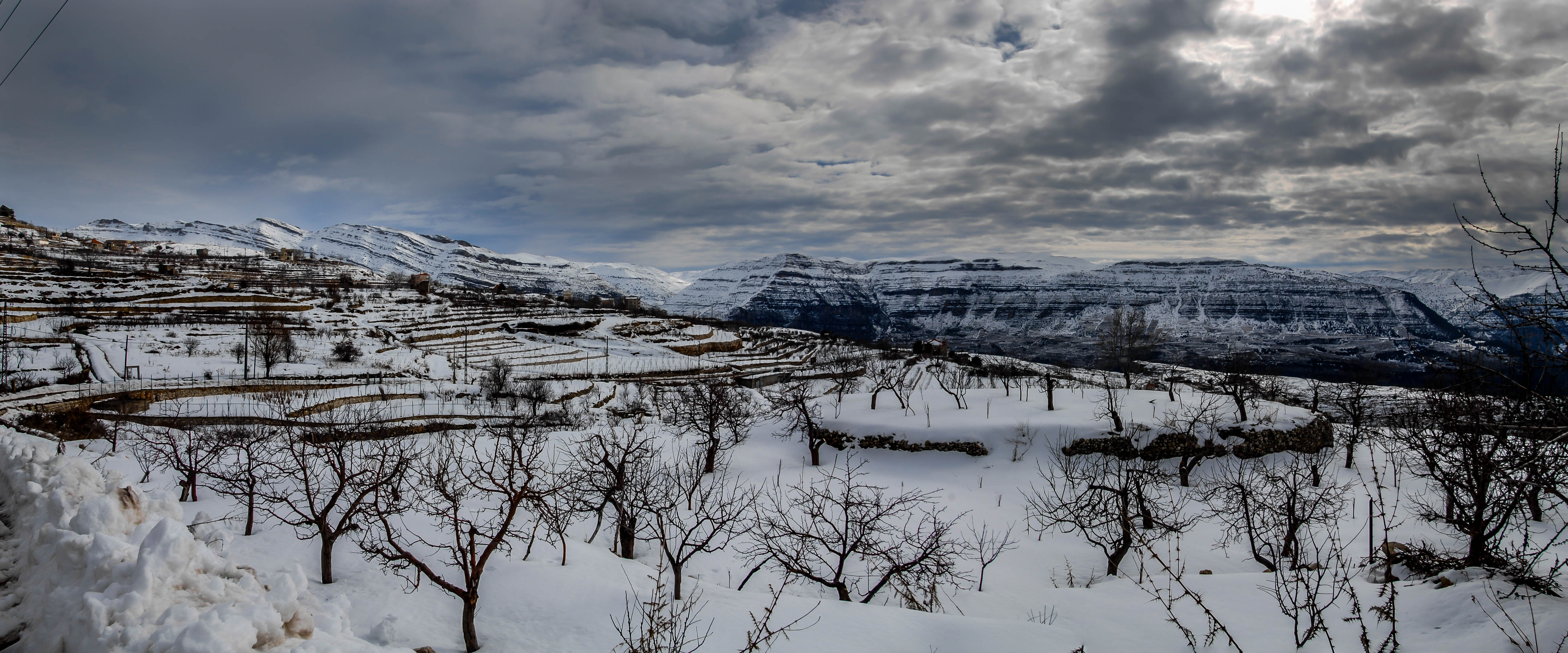
- Laqlouq Valley

- Location in Lebanon
- Coordinates: 34°8′19″N 35°52′20″E
- Country: Lebanon
- Governorate: Keserwan-Jbeil
- District: Byblos

Area
  - Total: 2.1 km^{2} (0.81 sq mi)
- Elevation: 1,780 m (5,840 ft)

Laqlouq (Arabic: لقلوق), also spelled Laklouk and also known as ′Arab Laqlouq (Arabic: عرب القلوق) is a small mountainous village in mountainous area in the Byblos District of Keserwan-Jbeil Governorate, Lebanon. It is located 69 kilometers northeast of Beirut. Laqlouq has an average elevation of 1,780 meters above sea level and a total land area of 210 hectares. Most of the population is Sunni Muslim, unlike the rest of Byblos District, which is largely Maronite Christian with a significant Shia Muslim minority.

== History ==
Laqlouq was founded in the 18th century by Arabs who are known today as ′Arab al-Laqlouq. Their presence dates back to the era of Emir Bashir Shihab II, who granted the village residents their lands and who vacationed there in the summer months. The original residents are generally poorer than the newer arrivals who immigrated to the village from nearby areas.

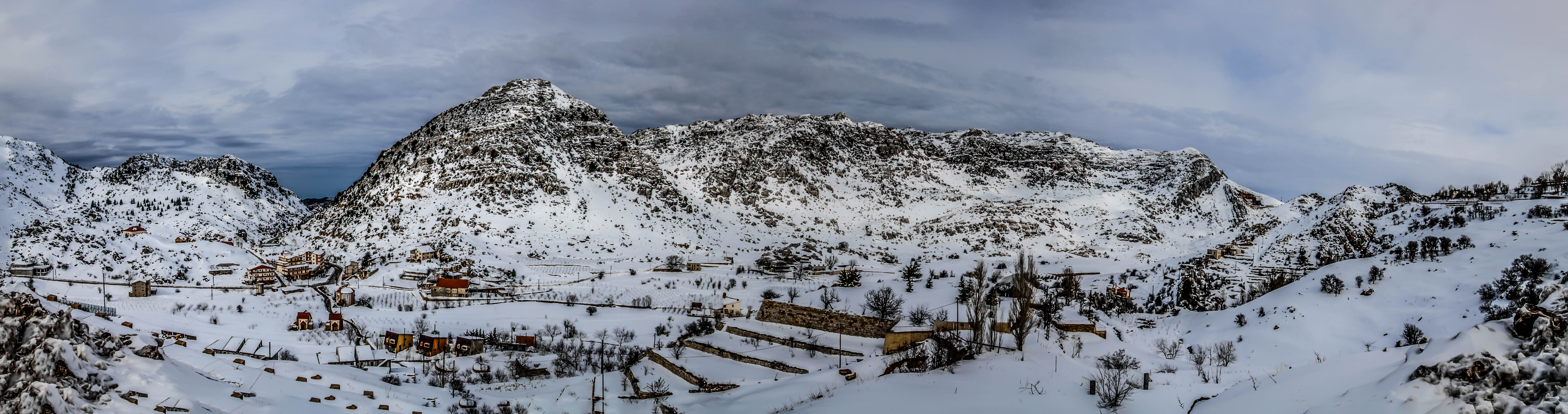
Laqlouq Mountain 2016

Visitors to Laqlouq in 1957 reported having a disturbed night whilst camping near the village due to gunfire and explosions as the district celebrated the release from prison of local land owner Sheikh Georges Beg Yussef. He had been sentenced to life in prison in Cairo for drug smuggling. His release was secured by local politician Hamid Beik Frangieh who had personally lobbied Egyptian President Gamal Abdel Nasser on Yussef's behalf.

Today, most of Laqlouq's working inhabitants are employed in trade in the coastal cities of Beirut or Tripoli, while local livestock owners graze their herds in the coastal rural areas. The village's main economic sector is agriculture, but its harvests are seasonally dependent, namely during the summer and fall, which is why most working residents are employed outside the village during the rest of the year. The main crops are apples, plums and vegetables.

== Local government ==
Laqlouq's municipal council consisting of nine members, headed by a chairman, who was Ahmad Khodr as of 2007. It also is administered by a village council, which has three members led by a mayor, who was Hasan Salim as of 2007. The village council of Salim was elected in 1998. With the exception of a locally funded summer school, there are no educational institutions in the village, whose municipal projects have been hindered due to a lack of revenue.
