= Hosrayel =

Hosrayel حصرايل Hisrail
- Nickname: Hisrayel
- Location in Lebanon
- Coordinates: 34°9′50″N 35°39′10″E
- Country: Lebanon
- Governorate: Keserwan-Jbeil
- District: Byblos
- Founder: Chahine Family

Government

Area
  - Total: 2.59 km^{2} (1.00 sq mi)
- Elevation: 220 m (720 ft)

Hosrayel (Arabic: حصرايل, also spelled Hisrail or Hasrayel) is a municipality in the Byblos District of Keserwan-Jbeil Governorate, Lebanon. It is 44 kilometers north of Beirut. Hosrayel has an average elevation of 220 meters above sea level and a total land area of 259 hectares. Its inhabitants are predominantly Maronite Catholics.
