= Jaj =

Jaj جاج Jaje
- Location in Lebanon
- Coordinates: 34°9′53″N 35°48′19″E
- Country: Lebanon
- Governorate: Keserwan-Jbeil
- District: Byblos

Area
  - Total: 11.74 km^{2} (4.53 sq mi)
- Elevation: 1,220 m (4,000 ft)

Jaj (Arabic: جاج, romanized: Jāj, also spelled Jaje) is a mountainous village in the Byblos District of Keserwan-Jbeil Governorate, Lebanon. It is 68 kilometers north of Beirut. Jaj has an average elevation of 1,220 meters above sea level and a total land area of 1,174 hectares. Its inhabitants are predominantly Maronite Catholics. Jaj is known for its cedar trees high in the mountains.

== History ==
Human habitation in Jaj can be traced back to Phoenician times. They made good use of its cedar forest and built their ships from its woods.

The village was formally established as a settlement by the Maronite Al-Semrani clan, resisting Islamic conquests in the Levant.

In the middle ages, the village is said to have been settled by crusaders and had a famous tower the villagers called "Tower of Crusaders" that was originally built by the Romans. In Ottoman times, the village was religiously diverse from early on.

Ottoman tax registers of 1519 indicate Jaj had a population of 28 Christian and 21 Shia Muslim households.

In Maronite literature, Jaj was the headquarters of the Sunni Muslim sheikhs of the Byblos region during the early Ottoman era, and that the Shia Muslim Hamade sheikhs Ali Dib, Ahmad Abu Za'zua and Sirhan succeeded them in 1600 by killing them on behalf of the Sayfa clan of Tripoli.

According to Lebanese historian Issa Alexander Maalouf, the Geagea family of Bsharri, to which politician Samir Geagea belongs, originated from the village of Jaj. The family was originally called Ma'eit and became known as "Geagea", which means "to control the donkeys" in Arabic because a forefather of the family used to care for the donkeys of the local Maronite patriarch Youhanna al-Jaji (1404–1455) of Jaj.

On 1 September 2020, French President Emmanuel Macron visited Jaj and planted a cedar tree to mark the centennial of Greater Lebanon.
