= Bentaël =

Bentaël بنتاعل
- Village
- Location within Lebanon
- Coordinates: 34°07′25″N 35°39′46″E
- Country: Lebanon
- Time zone: UTC+2 (EET)
  - Summer (DST): UTC+3 (EEST)
- Dialling code: +961

Bentaël (Arabic: بنتاعل) is a village is located 49 km north of Beirut, Lebanon. It rises to an altitude of 850 metres of sea level.

== Etymology ==
The name Bentaël comes from the Semitic root Bent Aal, meaning "The daughter of god Aal".

== Demographics ==
Bentaël is a small town of approximately 400 residents. Its inhabitants are predominantly Maronite Catholics.

== Climate ==
Bentaël has a Mediterranean climate characterized by a mild and virtually rain-free summer, pleasant fall and spring, and rainy winter with some snowy and freezing days. August is the hottest month of the year while January and February are the coldest. The average annual rainfall is approximately 1000 millimetres, virtually all of which falls in winter, autumn and spring. Much of the rain in autumn and spring falls on a limited number of days in heavy downpours. In winter, however, the rain is more evenly spread over a large number of days with scarcely snowing days with 1 or 2 days accumulation . Summer receives very little (if any) rainfall.

== Churches ==
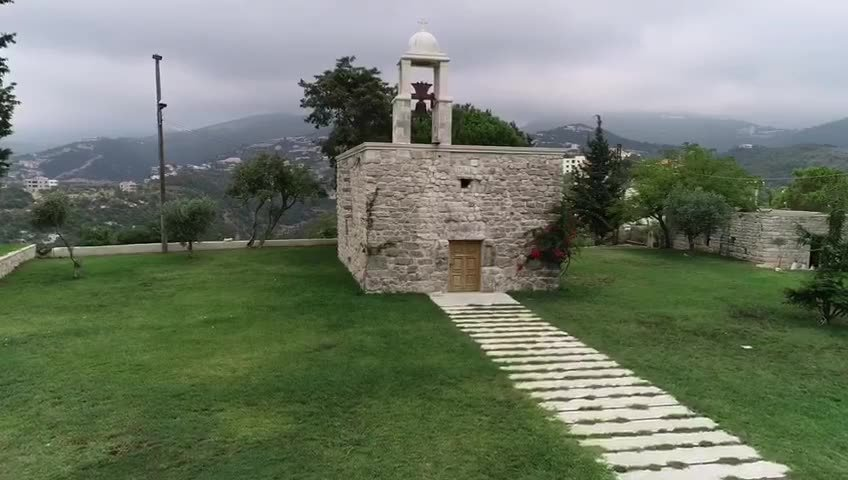
Mar Mema Church in Bentaël

The Mar Mema (Saint Mema) Church, which stands on a hill top in the middle of the village. Numerous other old churches are scattered around the village, most with ancient temple elements. Amongst these are the double church of Saints Paul and Peter, and the churches of Saint Mary and Saint John the Baptist.

== Bentaël Nature Reserve ==
The protected natural forest area of Bentaël Nature Reserve, the first protected area in Lebanon, established in 1981, located about 8 kilometers east of Byblos and on the right bank of Bentaël River, the total reserve covers 2 km2 - ranging between 300 and 850 meters above sea level.

The reserve has three entrances: Belle Vue, Carob Tree and Pinewood. offering hike trails at different levels. Inside the reserve, there is the 12th-century St John’s rock-cut hermitage and chapel, located 8 meters above the ground and composed of three cavities.
