= Lehfed =

Lehfed لحفد Lihfid
- Location in Lebanon
- Coordinates: 34°9′58″N 35°46′54″E
- Country: Lebanon
- Governorate: Keserwan-Jbeil
- District: Byblos

Area
  - Total: 5.29 km^{2} (2.04 sq mi)
- Elevation: 1,000 m (3,300 ft)

Lehfed (Arabic: لحفد, also known as Lihfid) is a municipality in the Byblos District of Keserwan-Jbeil Governorate, Lebanon. It is 55 kilometers north of Beirut. Lehfed has an average elevation of 1000 meters above sea level and a total land area of 542 hectares. There were three companies with more than five employees operating in the village as of 2008. Its population, consisting of 2400 inhabitants, 950 of them being electors, is predominantly Maronite Catholic.
Lehfed is the hometown of the Blessed Stephen Nehmé.

== Celebrations ==
- August 2: Feast of Saint Stephen, the town's patron saint
- August 15: Feast of the Assumption of Mary

== Places of worship ==
- Saint Stephen Church (patron saint of the village)
- House of Blessed Stephen Nehmé and its shrines
- Monastery of Saint Saba
- Monastery of Saint Eusebius
- Church of Our Lady
- Saint Elijah Church
- Saint Peter Church
- Chapel of Our Lady

== Families ==
The families native to Lehfed are Nehmé, Ghanem, Abi Khalil, Khalil, Sfeir, Mhanna, Khaled, Khoury, Ziadeh, Saadeh, Challita, Daou, Fadel, Matar and Nohra.

The families of Nehmé, Ghanem, Matar and Daou are descended from Moussa Al-Ghassani, a descendant of the Ghassanids, who were a Christian dynasty in the Levant under the aegis of the Byzantine Empire. Moussa came to Yanouh in the 9th century and settled there. Later, in 1121, some of his descendants moved to Lehfed.
