= Jabal Moussa Biosphere Reserve =

Nature reserve in Lebanon

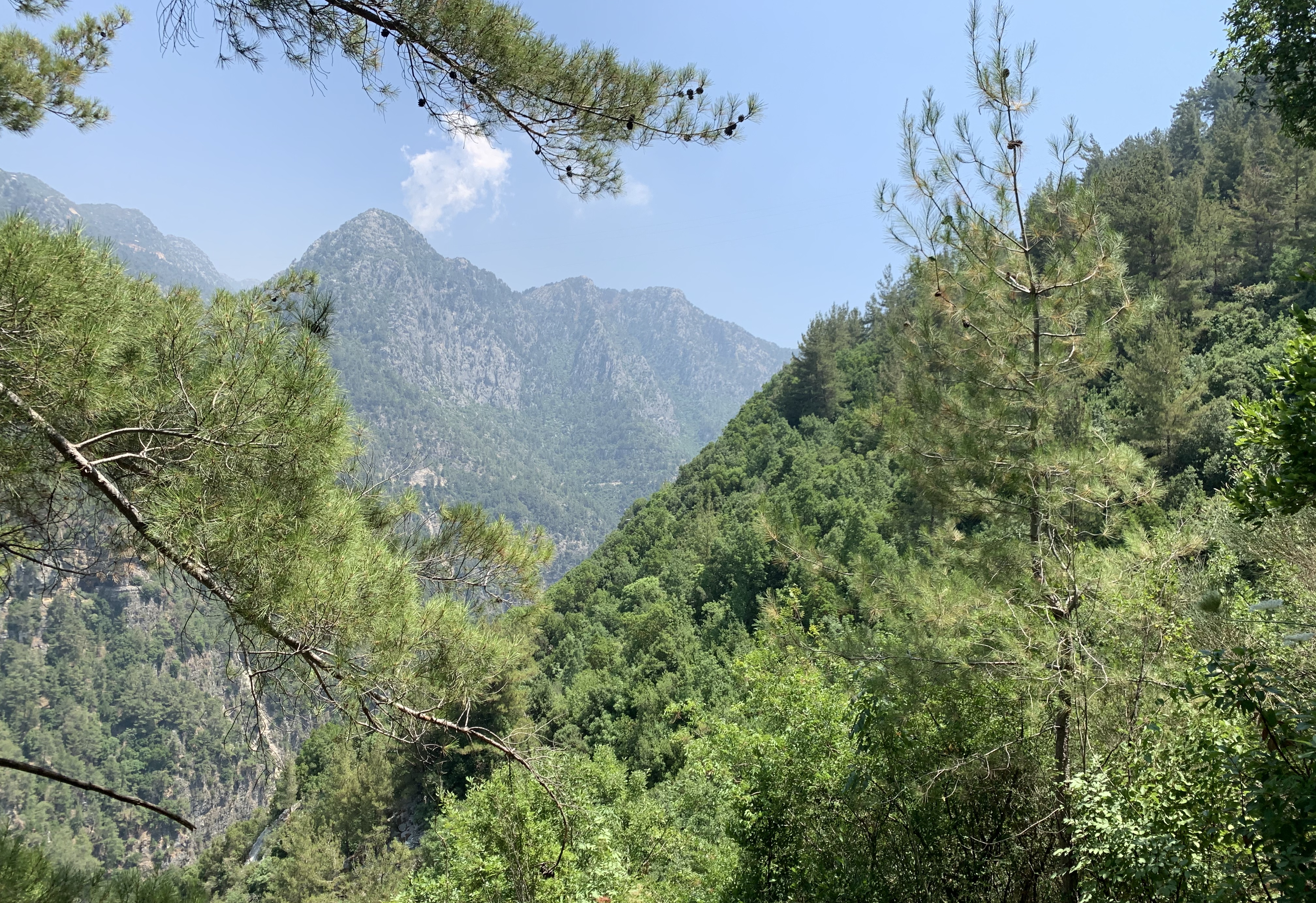
- Jabal Moussa Biosphere Reserve

- Location within Lebanon
- Location: Keserwan District, Lebanon
- Coordinates: 34°03′43.93″N 35°46′09.84″E
- Area: 65 km^{2} (25 sq mi)
- Website: www.jabalmoussa.org

Jabal Moussa Biosphere Reserve (Arabic: محمية جبل موسى للمحيط الحيوي) is a nature reserve located in the Keserwan District of Lebanon, on the shoulders of the western slopes of Mount Lebanon overlooking the Mediterranean Sea to the West. It covers an area of 6500 hectares, at an altitude ranging between 350 meters in the North-West and 1,700 meters to the South-East. Its main villages are: Yahchouch, Qahmez, Jouret el-Termos, Nahr ed Dahab, Ghbaleh, Ebreh, and Chouwan. Jabal Moussa and surrounding villages became part of the UNESCO Network of Biosphere Reserves under the Man and Biosphere (MAB) program in 2009. As part of the MAB program, JMBR addresses human livelihood improvement and nature conservation through combining natural sciences with social sciences, economics and education.

The Jabal Moussa mountain presents an exceptionally rich biodiversity, with more than 724 flora species, 25 mammal species, and more than 137 migratory and soaring birds species. In 2009, Jabal Moussa was designated a Globally Important Bird Area. Equally rich with cultural heritage, it portrays the interdependence of Man and Nature throughout history through various spiritual and historical sites dating back from the Phoenician, Roman, and Ottoman Periods.

== Climate ==
Under the Köppen climate classification, the reserve has a Mediterranean climate (Csa/Csb depending on the altitude), with mostly dry and warm summers and cool to cold, wet winters. The region's average annual rainfall is about 1350mm. The peaks of the Jabal Moussa mountain receive some intermittent snowfall during winter; however, the snowfall typically melts within a few days.

== Archeology ==
Part of the UNESCO Network of Biosphere Reserves under the Man and Biosphere (MAB), Jabal Moussa, which has fifteen hiking trails including one called Hadrian's Incline, named after the Roman Emperor Hadrian, who put up boundary markers around the cedar, oak, cypress, fir and juniper forests, and declared them his imperial domain; many of these inscriptions engraved on the rock survive today along with a network of Roman roads and stairs, built between 64 BC and AD 249. The largest archaeological site in the biosphere is called “Qornet el Deir” (translates to “the hill of the monastery”) and excavations done since 2017 have proven that the site was inhabited not only in the Roman Medieval eras, but its occupation goes back to the Bronze Age and the Phoenicians, who had a significant settlement that interconnected the Beqaa Valley and the coast. In 2022, U.S. Ambassador Dorothy Shea inaugurated the Hinterland Archaeological Heritage Project in Jabal Moussa, which was funded by the U.S. Ambassadors' Fund for Cultural Preservation to conserve, study, and showcase the archaeological collection of Jabal Moussa while connecting the various archaeological sites of the biosphere reserve to one another.

== See also ==
- Al Shouf Cedar Nature Reserve
- Horsh Ehden
- Aammiq Wetland
- World Network of Biosphere Reserves in the Arab States
