= Edde, Lebanon =

Edde إده
- Village
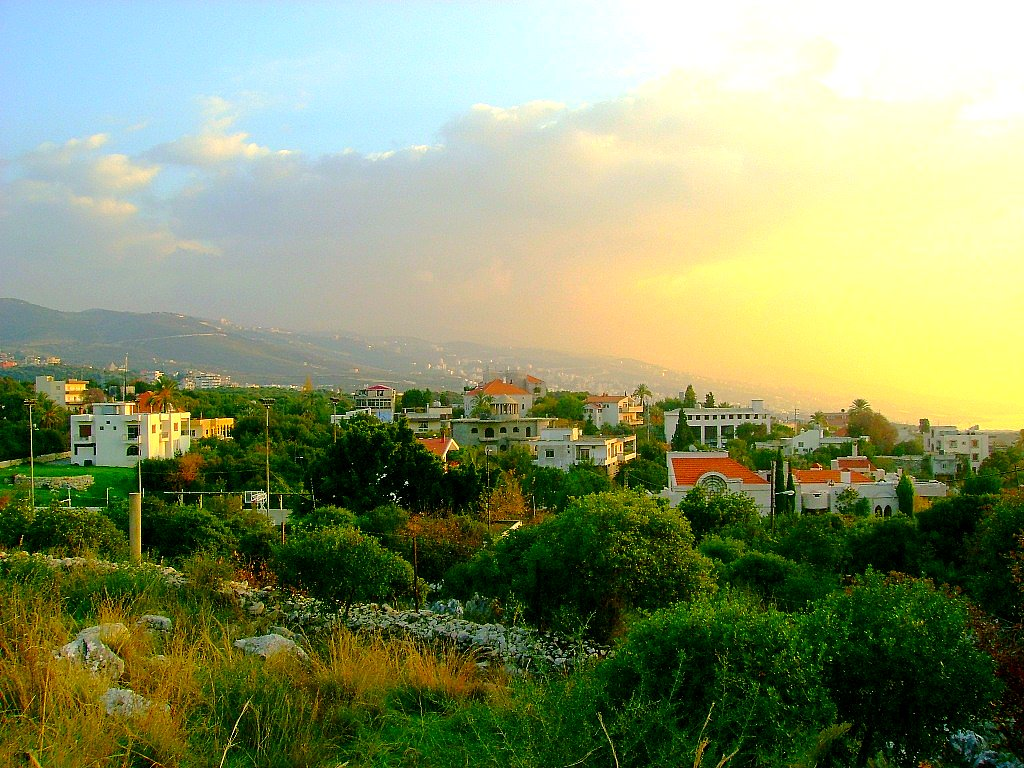
- Edde Village

- Location within Lebanon
- Coordinates: 34.139173°N 35.663449°E
- Country: Lebanon

Area
  - Total: 3.98 km^{2} (1.54 sq mi)
- Time zone: UTC+2 (EET)
  - Summer (DST): UTC+3 (EEST)
- Dialling code: +961

Edde or Eddé (Arabic: إده) village is located 45 km north of Beirut, Lebanon. It rises to an altitude of 210 metres (689.01 ft, 229 656 yd) of sea level and covers an area of 398 acres.

== Etymology ==
The name Edde comes from the Semitic root edd, meaning "strength".

== Demographics ==
Edde is a small town of approximately 700 residents. In Lebanese elections that took place in 2009, the municipality tallying 461 registered voters (226 males and 235 females). Its inhabitants are predominantly Maronite Catholics.

== Climate ==
Edde has a Mediterranean climate characterized by a hot and virtually rain-free summer, pleasant fall and spring, and cool, rainy winter. August is the hottest month of the year while January and February are the coldest.

The average annual rainfall is approximately 900 millimetres, virtually all of which falls in winter, autumn and spring. Much of the rain in autumn and spring falls on a limited number of days in heavy downpours. In winter, however, the rain is more evenly spread over a large number of days. Summer receives very little (if any) rainfall. Snow in Edde is rare and usually occurs without accumulation.

== Churches ==
The Mar Jurius (Saint George) Church, which stands in a small square in the middle of the village, was built with Roman temple remains. On a hill further south are the ruins of the church of Sayidat Douka.

Numerous other old churches are scattered around the village, most with ancient temple elements. Amongst these are the double church of Saints John and Theodore, and the churches of Saint Doumit and Saint Elisha.

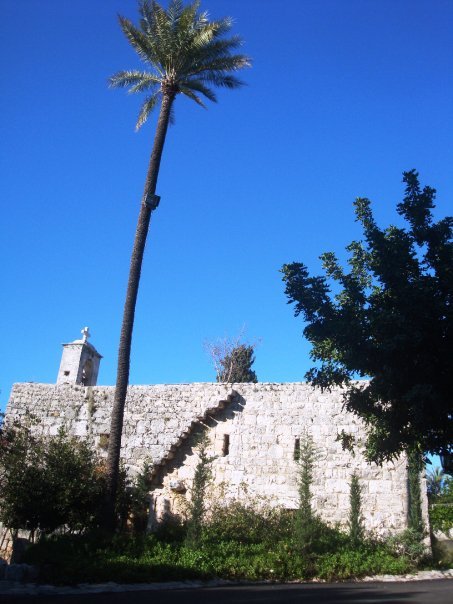
The Mar Jurius (Saint George) Church

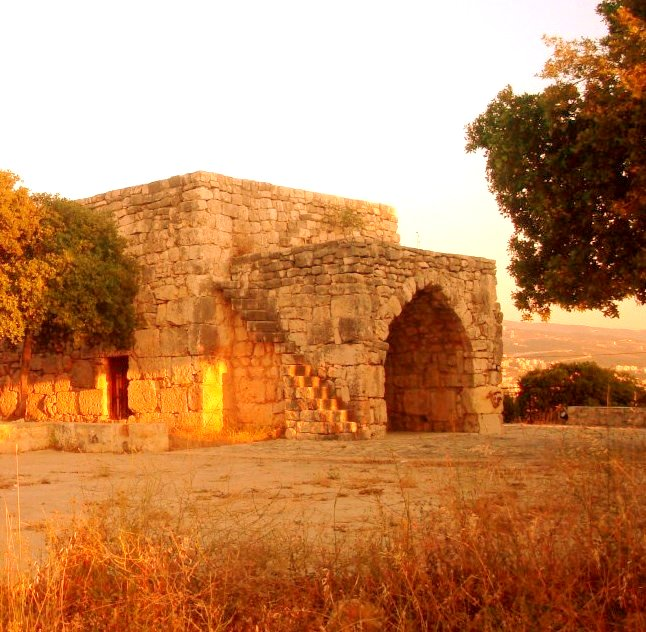
Mar Elisha

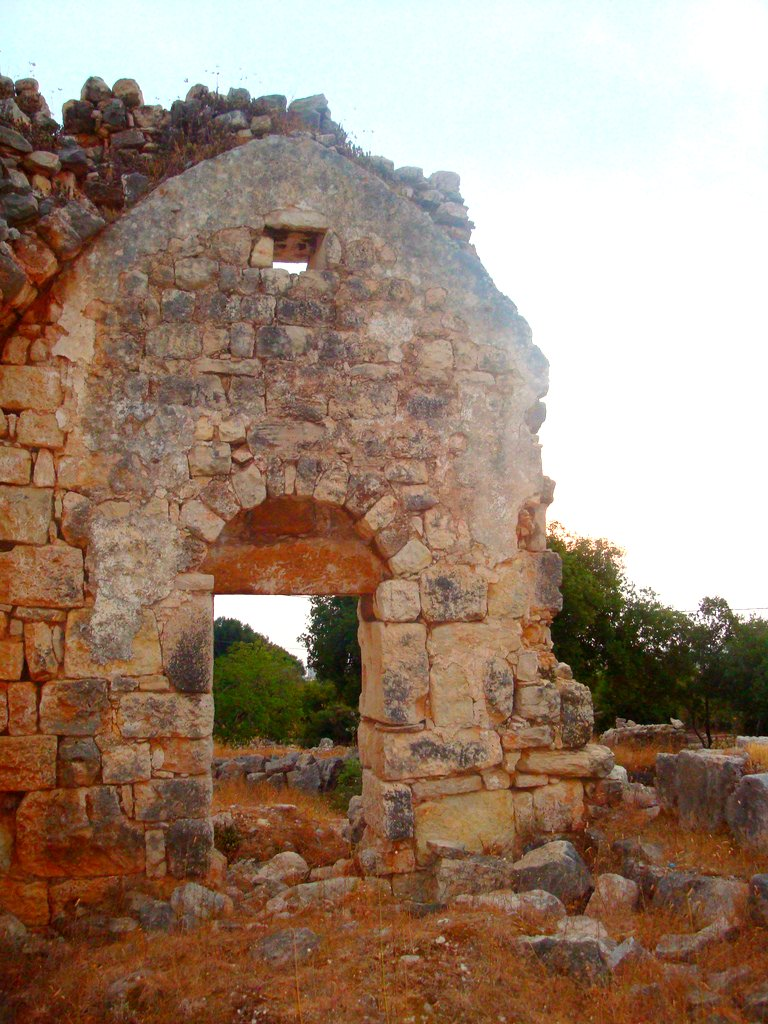
Ruins of the Church of Saints John and Theodore

== Edde Club ==
Edde Club is a sports, social and cultural club offering recreational sports facilities to its members: basketball, soccer, volleyball, table tennis and a gym. It is mostly active during summer season when it hosts national and regional tournaments.

== Gallery ==
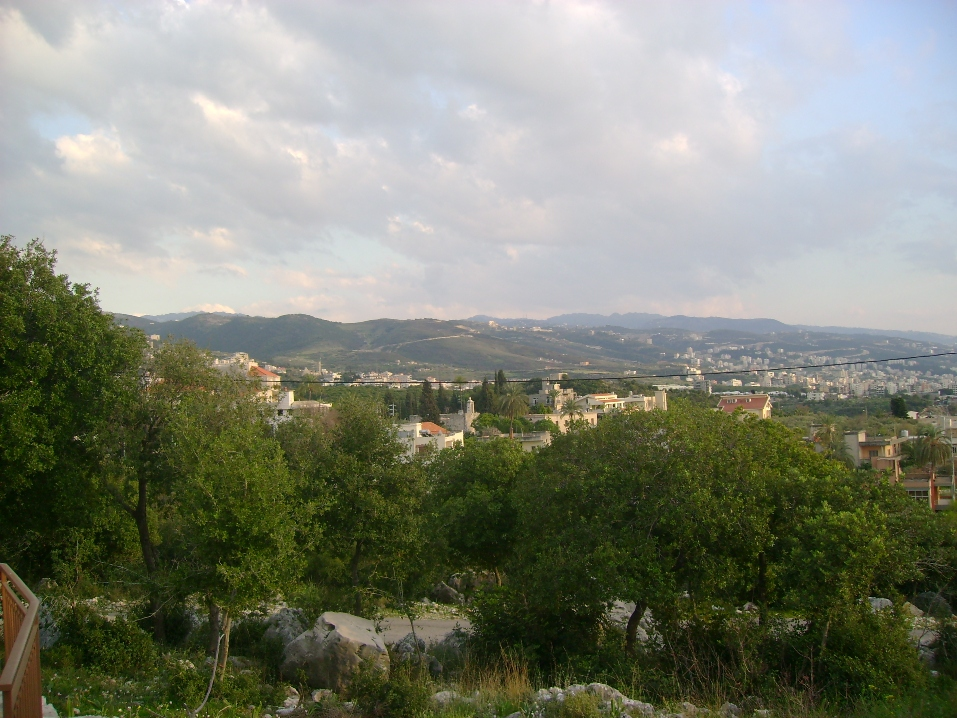
Edde Village
