= Keserwan-Jbeil Governorate =

Governorate of Lebanon

Keserwan-Jbeil كسروان - جبيل
- Governorate of Lebanon
- Location of Keserwan-Jbeil Governorate in Lebanon
- Coordinates: 34.1°N 35.8°E
- Country: Lebanon
- Established: 7 September 2017
- Capital: Jounieh

Government
  - Governor: Pauline Deeb (Independent)

Area
  - Total: 722 km^{2} (279 sq mi)

Population (31 December 2017)
  - Total: 282,222
  - Density: 391/km^{2} (1,010/sq mi)
- Time zone: UTC+2 (EET)
  - Summer (DST): UTC+3 (EEST)

Keserwan-Jbeil (Arabic: كسروان - جبيل) is the most recently created governorate of Lebanon. It consists of the districts of Jbeil and Keserwan. Keserwan-Jbeil covers an area of 722 km^{2} (279 sq mi) and is bounded by the North Governorate to the north, the Baalbek-Hermel Governorate to the east, the Mount Lebanon Governorate to the south, and the Mediterranean Sea to the west. The capital is at Jounieh.

As of the end of 2017, the combined population of the districts of Jbeil and Keserwan was estimated to be 282,222. Maronites comprise a large majority of the population in the governorate, while Shiites are the next largest confessional group. In the 2018 Lebanese general election, Jbeil and Keserwan formed the Mount Lebanon I electoral district which was allotted eight parliamentary seats in total, seven Maronite and one Shia.

A proposal to separate the districts of Jbeil and Keserwan from Mount Lebanon Governorate was first submitted to Parliament in 2003. The new governorate was finally established by the gazetting of Law 50 on 7 September 2017. Implementation of the governorate began in 2020 with the appointment of its first governor, Pauline Deeb.

Jabal Moussa Biosphere Reserve is located in the governorate.

The 2025 Municipal and Mayoral elections in Keserwan and Byblos where included in the Mount Lebanon elections as districts of Mount Lebanon and not as its own governorate.

== Districts ==
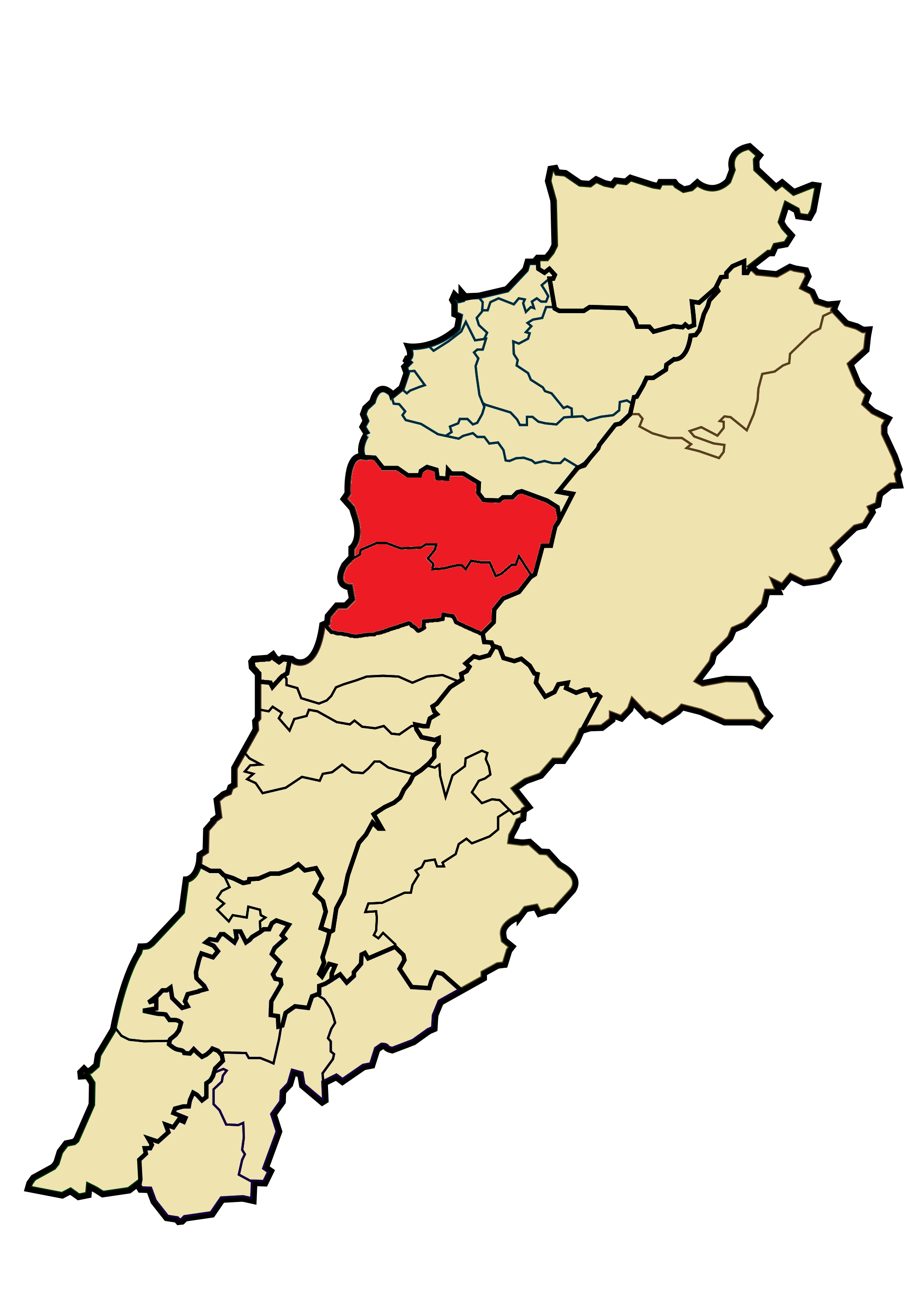
Districts of the Keserwan-Jbeil Governorate

The governorate is divided into two districts (aqḍiyah, singular qaḍāʼ):

District	Arabic name	Capital
Keserwan	قضاء كسروان	Jounieh
Byblos	قضاء جبيل	Byblos

The districts of Jbeil and Keserwan were part of Mount Lebanon Governorate until 7 September 2017, when they were separated to form Keserwan-Jbeil Governorate.

== Demographics ==
According to registered voters in 2014:

Religion in Keserwan-Jbeil Governorate
1. Christianity (87.4%)
2. Shia Islam (10.1%)
3. Sunni Islam (1.86%)
4. Other (0.60%)
Religion in Keserwan-Jbeil Governorate including Mount Lebanon Governorate
1. Christianity (63.0%)
2. Druze (18.9%)
3. Sunni Islam (9.06%)
4. Shia Islam (8.55%)
5. Other (0.51%)

	Christians						Muslims				Druze
Year	Total	Maronites	Greek Orthodox	Greek Catholics	Armenian Orthodox	Other Christians	Total	Shias	Sunnis	Alawites	Druze
2014	87.43%	75.70%	4.11%	3.59%	1.54%	2.49%	11.98%	10.11%	1.86%	0.01%	0.02%

== Cities, towns and villages ==
This list includes all cities, towns and villages with more than 6,000 registered voters in 2014:

English name	Population	District
Jounieh	16,310	Keserwan District
Byblos	8,727	Byblos District
Qartaba	6,212	Byblos District
