= List of schools in Lebanon =

Below is a list of primary and secondary schools in the Middle Eastern country of Lebanon. Tertiary schools are included in the list of universities in Lebanon.

== Beirut Governorate ==
Schools in the Beirut Governorate include:

- École Saint Vincent de Paul - Filles de la Charité - Clemenceau; svcc.college
- Collège des Soeurs des Saints-Coeurs - Sioufi - Rue Sioufi, Ashrafieh sioufi.sscc.edu.lb
- Collège Protestant Français - Rue Madame Curie cpf.edu.lb
- College de la Sagesse St Elie-Clemenceau - Rue Clémenceau
- College La Sagesse St Maron – Jdeideh – Metn; sagessesmj.edu.lb
- A & C Haydakos High School College – andc.college.edu.lb
- Ahliah school
- Al-Makassed Philanthropic Islamic Association of Beirut – makassed.org
- Al Bayader Beirut School
- American Academy of Beirut
- Armenian Evangelical Central High School – Achrafieh neighborhood of Beirut (city); aechs.com
- Armenian Evangelical Guertmenian School – Achrafieh neighborhood of Beirut (city)
- American Community School at Beirut
- Beirut Baptist School
- Beirut Evangelical School for Girls and Boys
- Beirut Modern School – bms95.edu.lb
- College La Sagesse St Joseph – Ashrafieh – Achrafieh neighborhood of Beirut (city); sagessesja.edu.lb
- Collège Louise Wegmann – clw.edu.lb
- College Melkart – melkart.edu.lb
- Collège Notre Dame de Nazareth – Achrafieh neighborhood of Beirut (city); ndn.edu.lb
- Collège Saint-Elie Btina – Beirut
- Collège Saint François Des Peres Capucinns – Hamra neighborhood of Beirut (city)
- Ecole des Trois Docteurs – Achrafieh neighborhood of Beirut (city); established 1835; www.eduvation.edu.lb/etd
- Ecole Secondaire des Filles de la Charité – Achrafieh neighborhood of Beirut (city); es-charite.edu.lb
- Ecole Zahret El Ihsan (ZEI) – Achrafieh neighborhood of Beirut (city); established 1880; zei.edu.lb
- Grand Lycée Franco-Libanais – Achrafieh neighborhood of Beirut (city)
- Collège Protestant Français- Kraytem - Beirut (city); www.cpf.edu.lb/cpf.edu.lb/
- Hariri High School II – hhs2.edu.lb
- International College, Beirut – Beirut; established 1891
- Lebanese International School – Beirut
- Lycée Abdel Kader – Batrakieh neighborhood of Beirut (city)
- Lycée Français International Elite – Msaytbeh neighborhood of Beirut (city)
- Lycée Franco-Libanais Verdun – Beirut
- Le lycée national beirut le-lycee-national.edu.lb
- Makassed Abed Al-Hadi Debs Vocational and Technical Center – debscenter.almakassed.edu.lb
- Makassed Abi Bakr Al-Sedeeq Elementary School – abss.almakassed.edu.lb
- Makassed Aisha Omm Al-Moemeneen Elementary School
- Makassed Ali Bin Abi Taleb College – abatc.almakassed.edu.lb
- Makassed Khadija Al-Kobra College – khadija.almakassed.edu.lb
- Makassed Khaled Bin Al-Walid College – kbwhc.almakassed.edu.lb
- Makassed Khalil Shehab Elementary School – ksps.almakassed.edu.lb
- Makassed Omar Bin Al-Khattab College – obkc.almakassed.edu.lb
- Makassed Othman Zi Al-Nourayn Elementary School
- Museum College - Beirut
- Wellspring Learning Community
- Yeprem and Martha Philibosian Armenian Evangelical College
- Students' Paradise School Beirut since 1962 www.paradise-school.com
- Saint Mary's Orthodox College (SMOC)

== Bekaa Governorate ==
Schools in the Bekaa Governorate include:

- School of Talents [Berr Al-Yas]
- Armenian Evangelical Secondary School of Anjar – Anjar
- Armenian Haratch CG School – Anjar
- Collège du Christ-Roi – Zahlé
- College Notre Dame des Apotres – Qabb Ilyas; ndak.edu.lb
- Collège St. Joseph des Soeurs Antonines – Ksara, Zahlé; antonineszk.org
- Lebanese International College – Rashaya
- Baaloul Public School
- Makassed Al-Loweis School
- Makassed Berr Al-Yas School
- Makassed Ersal School
- Makassed Ghazza School
- Makassed Jdaydet Al-Fakeha School
- Makassed Kaderiyya School
- Makassed Kamed Al-Lawz School
- Makassed Karoun School
- Makassed Kebb Al-Yas School
- Makassed Lala School
- Makassed Majdal Anjar School
- Makassed Marj School
- Makassed Swayri School
- Omar Al Mukhtar Al Tarbawy (OMEC)
- Al Manara Official High School
- Secondary Evangelical School Zahle
- Phoenix International School – Haret Hreik; phoenix.edu.lb

Canadian Academy of Baalbeck International and Lebanese curriculum- Douris Baalbeck

Secondary Evangelical School-Zahle

== Mount Lebanon Governorate ==
Schools in the Mount Lebanon Governorate include:

- Stars College - Dibbiyeh scs.edu.lb
- Al Rabih School – Qabreshmoon Aley District

rabihschool.com

- The International School of Choueifat – Choueifat Choueifat

iscchoueifat.sabis.net

- SABIS® International School – Adma Adma wa Dafneh

sisadma.sabis.net

- Leila C. Saad SABIS® School El-Metn Mtein

elmetn.sabis.net

- Lebanon Evangelical School for Boys and Girls - Loueizeh
- Toulouse College - Hadat
- Lebanese American School – Aramoun; www.las.edu.lb
- Beirut International School
- Albayan School – Choueifat, Beirut; albayanschools.com
- LWIS Adma International School lwis-ais.edu.lb
- Albayan High School – Hadat, Beirut; albayanschools.com
- Amjad High School – Choueifat
- Armenian Evangelical Peter and Elizabeth Torosian School – Amanos
- Armenian Evangelical Shamlian Tatigian Secondary School – Bourj Hammoud
- Athenee de Beyrouth – Bsalim
- Baskinta official public school - Baskinta
- Bchamoun Official Secondary School – Bchamoun
- BoldWin International School – Baakleen; boldwinschool.com
- Brummana High School – bhs.edu.lb
- College Des Apôtres – Jounieh
- Central College of the Lebanese Monks – Jounieh
- Christian Teaching Institute – Sin el Fil; cti-school.com
- Collège de Besançon – Baabdat
- Collège Elysée – Hazmieh; Home | LWIS-AiS | Keserwancollegeelysee.com

Member of aefe

- Collège des Frères Maristes Champville – Dik El Mehdi
- Collège des Sœurs des Saints Cœurs Hadath – Hadath, Mount Lebanon
- College Notre Dame de Louaize – Zouk Mosbeh; collegendl.com
- College Notre Dame des Graces – Kfarshima
- Collège Notre Dame des Soeurs Maronites de la Sainte Famille - Sahel Alma

Ecole Notre Dame – Sahel-Alma

- Collège Saint Joseph – Antoura – Antoura; college-antoura.edu.lb
- École Val Pere Jacques des Sœurs de la croix – Bqennaya; valperejacques.edu.lb; established in 1919
- Dhour Shweir Public Secondary School_Shweir
- Eastwood College – Kfarshima; established 1973 eastwoodcollege.com
- Eastwood International School – Mansourieh; established 1973 eastwoodis.com
- Eidyia Private School (After School) – Rabieh; eidyia-edu.com
- Hassan Kassir High School - Bir Hassan
- Hripsimiantz College – Jdeideh; hripsimiantzlb.com
- Institution Moderne du Liban – Fanar; instmod.edu.lb
- Jesus and Mary School – Rabieh, Cornet Chahwan; jmrab.edu.lb
- Lebanese Modern School – Baakleen
- Lycee Amchit – Amsheet; lyceeamchit.edu.lb
- Lycée de Ville – Adonis, Zouk Mosbeh; etablissement homologué par le Ministère français de l'Education Nationale; lyceedeville.com
- Le lycée national Choueifat; www.le-lycee-national.edu.lb
- Lycée Franco-Libanais Nahr Ibrahim – Nahr Ibrahim
- Makassed Barja School
- Makassed Khaldeh School
- Mont La Salle Ain-Saade
- Montana International College - Deek El Mehdi www.mic.edu.lb
- New Century School – Choueifat; newcentury-school.org
- Sagesse High School – Ain Saadeh; sagessehs.edu.lb
- College des freres Mont La Salle - Ain Saade
- Saint Joseph School – Cornet Chahwan; sjs.edu.lb
- Sainte Famille - Fanar; csff.edu.lb
- Shouf High School – Bakaata
- Universal College – Aley; universalcollege.edu.lb
- Wafaa Secondary School – Baakleen
- Yeghishe Manoukian College – Dbayeh

== North Governorate ==
Schools in the North Governorate include:

- Bishmezzine High School-Koura
- The International School of Choueifat - Koura
- Rawdat Al-Fayhaa secondary school (Tripoli, Lebanon)
- Collège des Soeurs des Saints Coeurs - El Mina; tripoli.sscc.edu.lb
- Azm School – Tripoli; azmschool.edu.lb
- David Karam Educational Campus - Koura District
- Ecole des Peres Antonins - El Mina
- Lycée Franco-Libanais Tripoli – Tripoli
- Makassed Akkar Al-Atika School – Akkar al-Atika
- Makassed Anfeh School
- Makassed Bayt Ayoub School
- Makassed Bebneen School
- Makassed Der Amar School
- Makassed Fnaydek School
- Makassed Mhammara School
- Makassed Moshmosh School
- Makassed Wadi Al-Jamous School
- Makassed Wata Moshmosh School
- Modern School – Akkar District
- Sainte Famille Maronite – Tripoli
- Tripoli Evangelical School for Boys & Girls – Tripoli
- noor el Houda school

== South Governorate ==
Schools in the South Governorate include:

- Stars College – Abbasiyeh (IB World School 064315 & Cognia accredited) ; scs.edu.lbscs.edu.lbwww.scs.edu.lb
- Stars College – Ghaziyeh ; www.scs.edu.lb
- Stars College – Nabatiyeh ; www.scs.edu.lb
- Al Hadara College - Lebaa, Jezzine District
- Al Ittihad School - Tyre, Hay Al Ramel, School Number: 07740212
- Al-Qualaa Secondary School - Sidon; qss.edu.lb
- College Notre Dame de Machmouché – Jezzine
- Makassed Dayaat Al-Arab School
- Makassed Sedekeen School
- Makassed Selaa School
- Makassed Shaayteyye School
- National Evangelical Institute for Girls & Boys – Sidon; neigb.net
- Rafic Hariri High School – Sidon; rhhs.edu.lb
- Tyre Community School – Jal El Bahr, Tyre; established 2012; tyreschool.net
- Tyre Official School for Girls
- Sscc jezzine
- Lycée Hanaway - Hanaouay;lyceehanaway.com

== Unsorted ==
=== A–D ===
- Adma International School - Adma, Fatka
- Adventist Secondary School – bass.edu.lb
- A.G.B.U. Boghos K. Garmirian
- A.G.B.U. Levon G. Nazarian
- A.G.B.U. Tarouhy Hovagimian Secondary School
- Al Amlieh High School
- Al Batoul
- Al Bayader
- Al Iman
- Al Mahdi
- Al Mustafa School
- Al Rafiid
- Al Takmalia - Halba
- Al Zahraa School - Borj al Shimali
- American High School Saida
- Amilieh Technical Institute – higher educational institute
- Antonine International School
- Antonine Sisters School Ksara, Ghazir, Mar Elias
- Ashrafieh Public Secondary School
- Barja Modern School
- Bourj International College
- Canadian High School (Aramoun/Bshamoun)
- Cedars International School – cedars.edu.lb
- Charite
- Charity School Mreijeh (Antoine N. Houaiss)
- City International School (CIS)
- Collège de la Providence – established 1952; providence.edu.lb
- College de la Sagesse St Elie-Clemenceau
- College des Apotres – Rawda
- Collège des Frères Maristes – Byblos
- Collège des Pères Antonin Baabda
- College des Soeur du Rosaire Mountazah
- Collège des Soeurs des Saints Coeurs – Bickfaya, Kfarhbab, Ain Najem Mansourieh, Fakiha, Byblos, Sioufi
- College Louise Wegman
- Collège Mar Doumit des Soeurs Antonines – cmdsa.edu.lb
- Collège Melkart – collegemelkart.com
- Collège Notre Dame – Balamand
- Collège Notre Dame de Jamhour
- College Notre Dame des Soeurs Salvatoriennes – Aabra
- Collège Notre Dame des Soeurs Salvatoriennes Hadath-Baabda
- Collège Patriarcal
- Collège Protestant Francais – cpf.edu.lb
- Collège Sacre-Coeur Gemmayze – established 1894
- Collège Saint-Grégoire – affiliated to the Collège Notre Dame de Jamhour
- Computer and Industrial Sciences College (also known as CIS College) – ciscollege.edu.lb
- Deutsche Schule Beirut (German School Beirut)

=== E–Z ===
- Ecoles D'Irfane
- George Mhanna's School
- Greater Beirut Evangelical School
- GreenField College – Bir Hassan
- Guardian Angel School – Byblos
- Ikhaa National School
- International College, Ain Aar – Ain Aar; established 1891
- International Lessing School Chouifat Amjad School
- International School – Al Koura; established 1985
- Institut Pédagogique National de L'Enseignement Technique – higher educational institute
- La Cité Nationale
- Lady of Balamand High School
- Lebanese English International School
- Lebanon Evangelical School for Boys and Girls, Loueizeh
- Levon & Sophia Hagopian Armenian College
- Ligue Des Freres
- Lycée Adonis
- Lycée de la Finnesse
- Lycée Déscartes – Baasir
- Lycée Hamidiye Arka Akkar
- Lycée Laique
- Lycée Laure Moughayzel - Chahrouri
- Lycée Musé
- Lycée National
- Lycée Notre Dame
- Lycée Pascal
- Mar Sawarios
- Maten High School
- Melankton and Haig Arslanian Djemaran
- Mesrobian College
- Modern Community School – Ain Al Rummaneh
- Montana International College – Deek El Mehdi
- Moussaitbeh Secondary Adventist School – mass.edu.lb; established 1929
- National American School
- Notre Dames des Graces
- Perpetual School
- Rawdat Al Fayhaa Schools
- Toulouse College
- Rawda High School
- Rayan Abou Hamdan High School – El Malek
- Sagesse Saint Jean Brasilia
- Saint Joseph de l'Apparition
- Saint Mary's Orthodox School
- Ste Anne Besançon Beyrouth
- Universal High School – Doha Aramoun
- Zahrat al-Ihsan (Flower of Charity) – established 1880

== See also ==
- Education in Lebanon
- Lists of schools
