= Evangelical School =

Evangelical School may refer to:

- Armenian Evangelical Central High School, Lebanon
- Armenian Evangelical School of Trad, East Beirut, Lebanon
- Basel Evangelical Mission Higher Secondary School, Palakkad, India
- Basel Evangelical School, Mangalore, Karnataka, India
- Evangelical Christian School, Tennessee, U.S.
- Evangelical School of Smyrna, Greece
- National Evangelical School (disambiguation)
- Trinity Evangelical Divinity School, Illinois, U.S.
- Tripoli Evangelical School, Tripoli, North Lebanon
- National Evangelical School, Homs, Syria
