= Zgheib =

Zgheib is a surname. Notable people with the surname include:

- Elsa Zgheib (born 1981), Lebanese actress
- Mohammad Zgheib, Lebanese officer
- Paul Zgheib (born 1977), Lebanese photographer
