= Armenian Evangelical Guertmenian School =

- Ashrafieh, Beirut; Lebanon

Information
- Type: Private
- Established: 1931
- Closed: 2015
- Grades: Kindergarten - Grade 9
- Religious Affiliation: Armenian Evangelical Church

The Armenian Evangelical Gertmenian School (Armenian: Հայ Աւետարանական Կերթմէնեան Վարժարան) was a primary school founded in 1931 in Beirut, Lebanon. It had kindergarten and six primary classes.

It was located in the heavily Armenian neighborhood Nor Hadjin, in greater Bourj Hammoud.

== History ==
In 1931, the Armenian Evangelical Gertmenian School (AEGS) opened its door with a Kindergarten and three Elementary classes, with the financial contributions of Costantine Guertmenian and Sarkis Devirian, of other Hajentzy Armenians living in the United States, and a grant from the League of Nations. In 1940, the first class of thirteen students graduated.

By that time, student enrollment had outgrown the original building. As the founders of the school deceased, their children decided it would be in the best interest of AEGS to grant ownership of the property and its operation to the Armenian Missionary Association of America. With a contribution from Mr. Stephen Philibosian and his assistance in finding new benefactors, funds were raised for the necessary reconstruction of the Kindergarten and elementary school buildings. Henry Guertmenian undertook the expense of constructing a new chapel.

The school prospered till 1975, when the Civil War started in Lebanon. In 1978, the school building was severely damaged by shelling and it was occupied by the militia of the area. But again, as soon as a ceasefire was announced, the classrooms were repaired and lessons resumed.

The school closed some time after 2013.

== See also ==
- Armenian Evangelical School of Trad (Trad, Lebanon)
- Armenian Evangelical Peter and Elizabeth Torosian School (Amanos, Lebanon)
- Armenian Evangelical Shamlian Tatigian Secondary School (Bourj Hammoud, Lebanon)
- Armenian Evangelical Central High School (Ashrafieh, Lebanon)
- Yeprem and Martha Philibosian Armenian Evangelical College (Beirut, Lebanon)
- Armenian Evangelical Secondary School of Anjar (Anjar, Lebanon)
- Haigazian University (Riad El Solh, Beirut, Lebanon)
