= Lycée Franco-Libanais =

Lycée Franco-Libanais may refer to:

- Grand Lycée Franco-Libanais
- The Lycée Franco-Libanais Tripoli
- Lycée Franco-Libanais Habbouche-Nabatieh
- Lycée Franco-Libanais Nahr-Ibrahim
