= Adonis, Lebanon =

Adonîs أدونيس Adūnīs
- Location in Lebanon
- Coordinates: 34°4′47″N 35°44′11″E
- Country: Lebanon
- Governorate: Keserwan-Jbeil
- District: Byblos
- Elevation: 629 m (2,064 ft)

Adonis (Arabic: أدونيس, also spelled Adūnīs) also known as Adonis Oua Sannour is a municipality in the Byblos District of Keserwan-Jbeil Governorate, Lebanon. It is located within Mount Lebanon, 48 kilometers north of Beirut. Adonis has an average elevation of 629 meters above sea level. Its inhabitants are predominantly Maronite Christians and Shia Muslims. As of 2014, the town had 476 registered voters.

== Etymology ==
The name Adonis comes from the Greek word Ἄδωνις (Ádōnis), Ancient Greek pronunciation: [ádɔːnis]) which is ultimately derived from the Canaanite word 𐤀𐤃𐤍 (ʼadōn), meaning "lord" in reference to the mythological figure Adonis who was known in Lebanon to have lived and died in Afqa near the Abraham River (which was formerly named after him as well).
