= Robert Mardini =

Lebanese–Swiss humanitarian

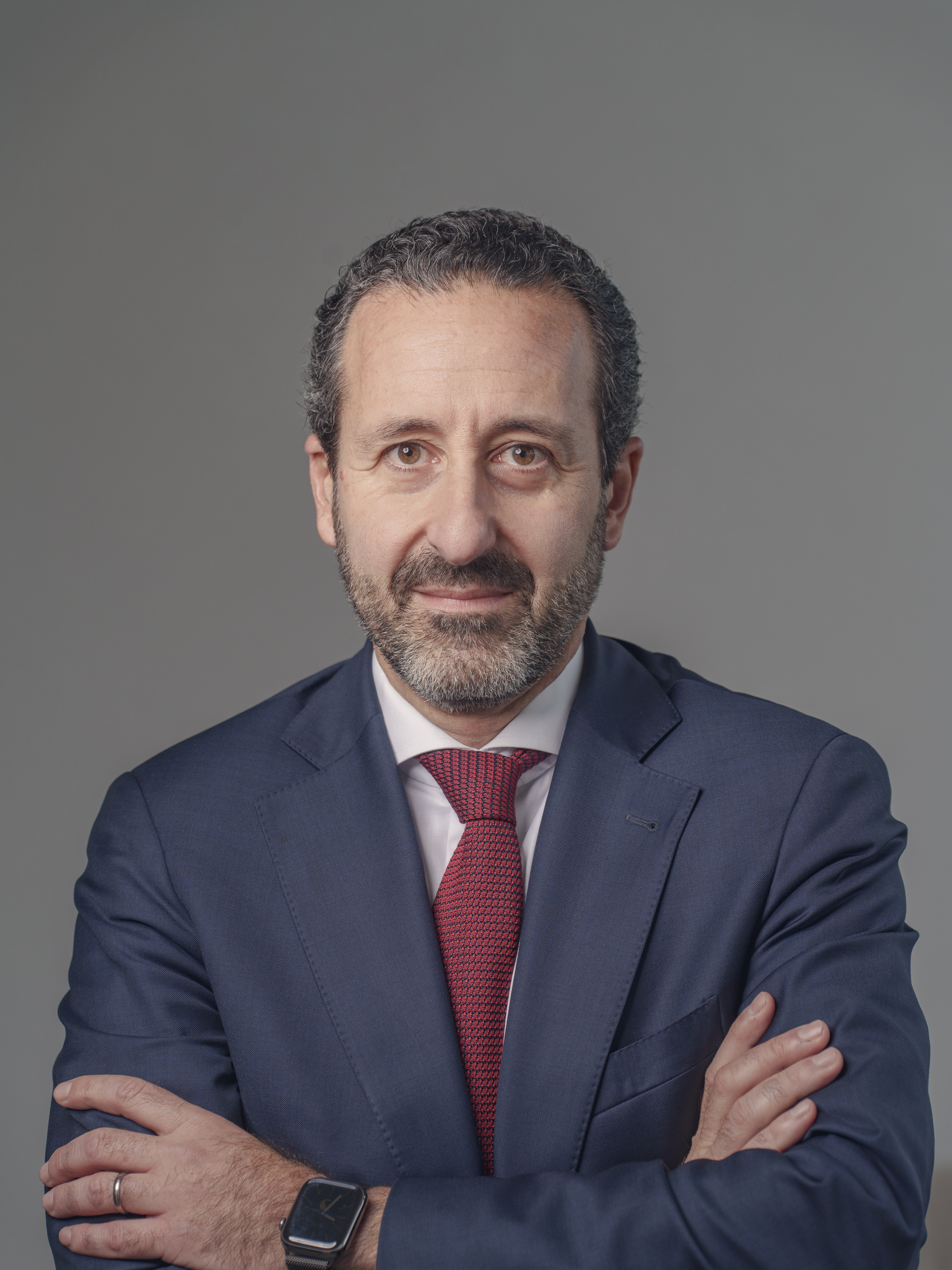
- Robert Mardini

Director General of the Geneva University Hospitals
- Incumbent
- Assumed office 1 September 2024
- Preceded by: Bertrand Levrat

Director-General of the International Committee of the Red Cross
- In office 1 April 2020 – 30 March 2024
- Preceded by: Yves Daccord
- Succeeded by: Pierre Krähenbühl

Robert Mardini (born 6 August 1972) is a Lebanese-Swiss humanitarian and public health leader. He took up office as Director General of the University hospital of Geneva in September 2024; he previously served as Director-General of the International Committee of the Red Cross (ICRC) from 2020 to 2024.

== Early life and education ==
Mardini was born and raised in Tripoli, Lebanon. He was educated at the Lycée Franco-Libanais Alphonse de Lamartine and at École Polytechnique Fédérale de Lausanne (EPFL) in Switzerland, where he was awarded a Master of Science in civil engineering and hydraulics in 1996.

== Professional career ==
Mardini joined the ICRC in 1997, coordinating water engineering programmes in Rwanda and Iraq, before leading the organization's Water & Habitat Unit with projects in over 40 countries, improving access to water, sanitation and hygiene services to around 14 million people per year. He went on to hold various senior positions within the organization, including Deputy Director General (2010–2012), Regional Director for the Near and Middle East (2012–2018) and Permanent Observer of the ICRC to the United Nations & Head of Delegation in New York (2018–2020). In this latter role, Mardini steered the ICRC's diplomatic engagement with the UN Security Council, the UN General Assembly, Member States and UN entities to influence decisions on humanitarian issues across policy themes and geographic contexts. He has spoken and published on a broad range of key issues such as armed conflict and humanitarian crisis in the Middle East; international humanitarian law; sexual violence in conflict; humanitarian action and counter-terrorism measures; the future of humanitarian action and digital transformation. Mardini was appointed ICRC Director-General in October 2019 and took up his position on 30 March 2020.

His tenure began during the COVID-19 pandemic, followed closely by the Russia-Ukraine international armed conflict, which precipitated a period of extraordinary humanitarian needs worldwide. At the same time, the gap between global humanitarian funding and needs widened to historical levels, with record shortfalls across the sector necessitating significant budget reductions. After almost three decades with the institution, Mardini completed his four-year mandate as Director General in March 2024.

== Awards and recognition ==
In 2020, he received the EPFL Alumni Award, a distinction awarded to former graduates who have led exceptional careers, "in recognition of his skills, strategic vision, and commitment, which have shaped a distinguished career within one of the most essential international organizations, thereby directly contributing to the protection of human lives around the world."

In 2021, Robert Mardini was elected a life member of the Swiss Academy of Engineering Sciences - SATW, "in recognition of his ability to mobilize his teams to provide effective emergency aid to victims of major armed conflicts."

Robert Mardini has been a member of the EPFL Strategic Advisory Board since 2022.

He was appointed an Executive in Residence of the IMD International Institute for Management Development in Lausanne in January 2024.

== Personal life ==
Mardini has dual Lebanese and Swiss citizenship. He is married and has two daughters.
