= Yeghishe Manoukian College =

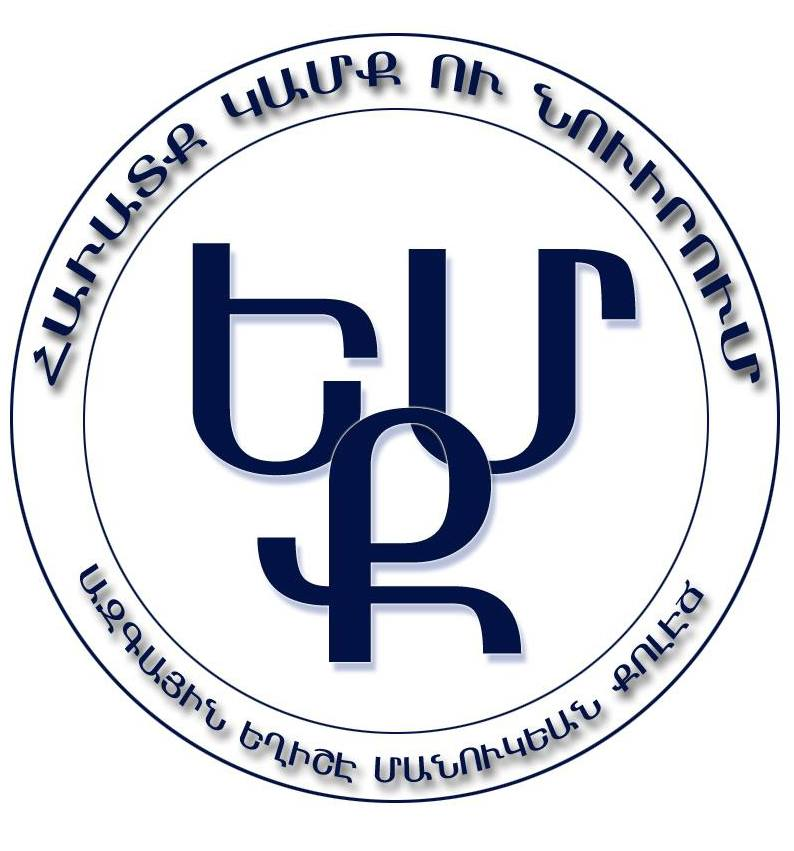
- Dbayyeh, Beirut; Lebanon

Information
- Type: KG, Elementary School, Middle School, High School.
- Motto: Faith, Will & Dedication
- Opened: 1963
- School district: Metn
- Website: ymc.me

Yeghishe Manoukian College is an Armenian college in Lebanon. It is situated in Dbayyeh, in the Metn district. It is considered one of the best Armenian schools in the vast Armenian Diaspora, and also in Lebanon thanks to its high success rates in the Lebanese Brevet and Baccalaureate exams.

== History ==
Yeghishe Manoukian College was founded in 1963 under the name of Mardikian Kindergarten-Elementary School. The founder of the school is believed to be Catholicos Sahag A. Khabian in the 1930s. Initially the school was located next to the Armenian Catholicosate of the Great Home of Cilicia, and was called Mesrobian School.

- In 1963, Nerces Pakhdikian was assigned director. In 1966, Archbishop Mesrob Ashjian was named director of the school, who at the same time was also the director of the seminary. He had Oshagan Choloian and Aram Keshishian as assistants. Both monks at the time, currently Oshagan Choloian is the guide of the Armenian diocese of Kuwait, and the latter currently the Catholicos of the Great Home of Cilicia.
- In 1969, the Lebanese Diocese board of Education invited Sarkis Choloian to guide the school. He first acted as a senior teacher then as principal until the end of the 1984–1985 academic year. During his reign the Mardikian Elementary school grew and starting from 1981, step by step climbed the secondary school levels. In the reign of S. Choloian, the number of students increases to such an extent that the school grounds are no longer capable of accepting any more students. The rise in students forces the administration to reject any newcomers.

In the course of 1984–1985 academic year, Catholicos Karekin the second comes to the rescue of the schools situation. The 10,000 m2 land in Dbayyeh, bought by the handsome donation of Vatche Manoukian and put under the disposal of the Catholicosate of Cilicia, along with the school buildings located on the property are given to the Mardikian School to transport there.

After this arrangement, the school was renamed in honor of Vatche Manoukians father, Yeghishe Manoukian, and beginning in 1985, the school became Yeghishe Manoukian National Secondary School.

For the 1985–1986 academic year, Papken Papazian and Manoushag Boyadjian were invited to become the principals of the school. At the end of the second year the school became a fully functioning college.

== Recent history ==
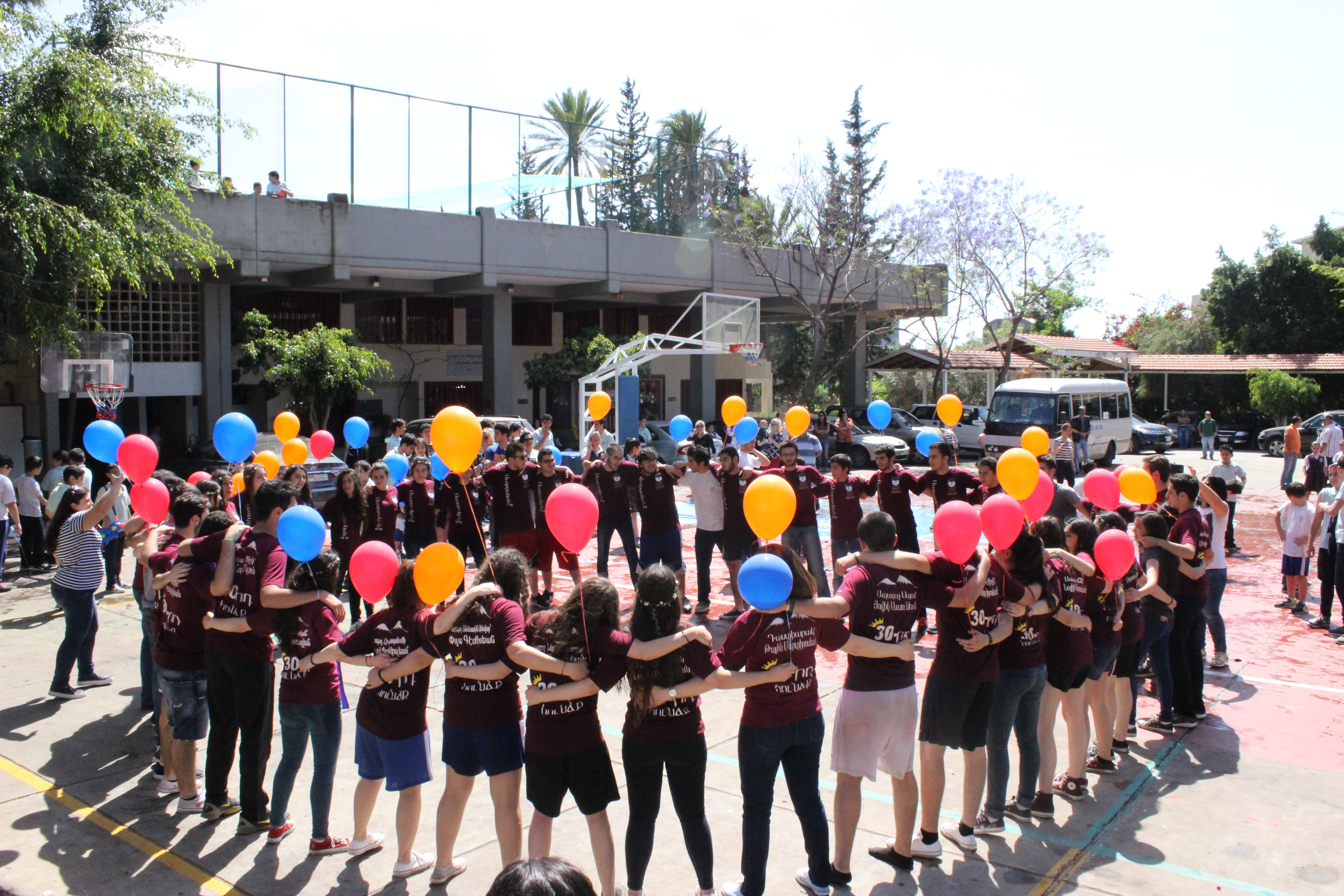
Last day for seniors at Yeghishe Manoukian College in the Matn District of Lebanon in 2016.

After the death of Papazian in February 1990, Manoushag Boyadjian conducted the school management until her death in March 2005. In September 2005, Seta Boyadjian (Manoushag Boyadjian's sister) was assigned principal of the school. She remained principal for 6 years, until in 2011 Zohrab Ghazarian was assigned principal. In the near future, Antranik Sarkissian will be assigned as the ambassador of YMC.

== See also ==
- List of schools in Lebanon
- Armenians in Lebanon
