= Baakline =

Baakline بعقلين
- City
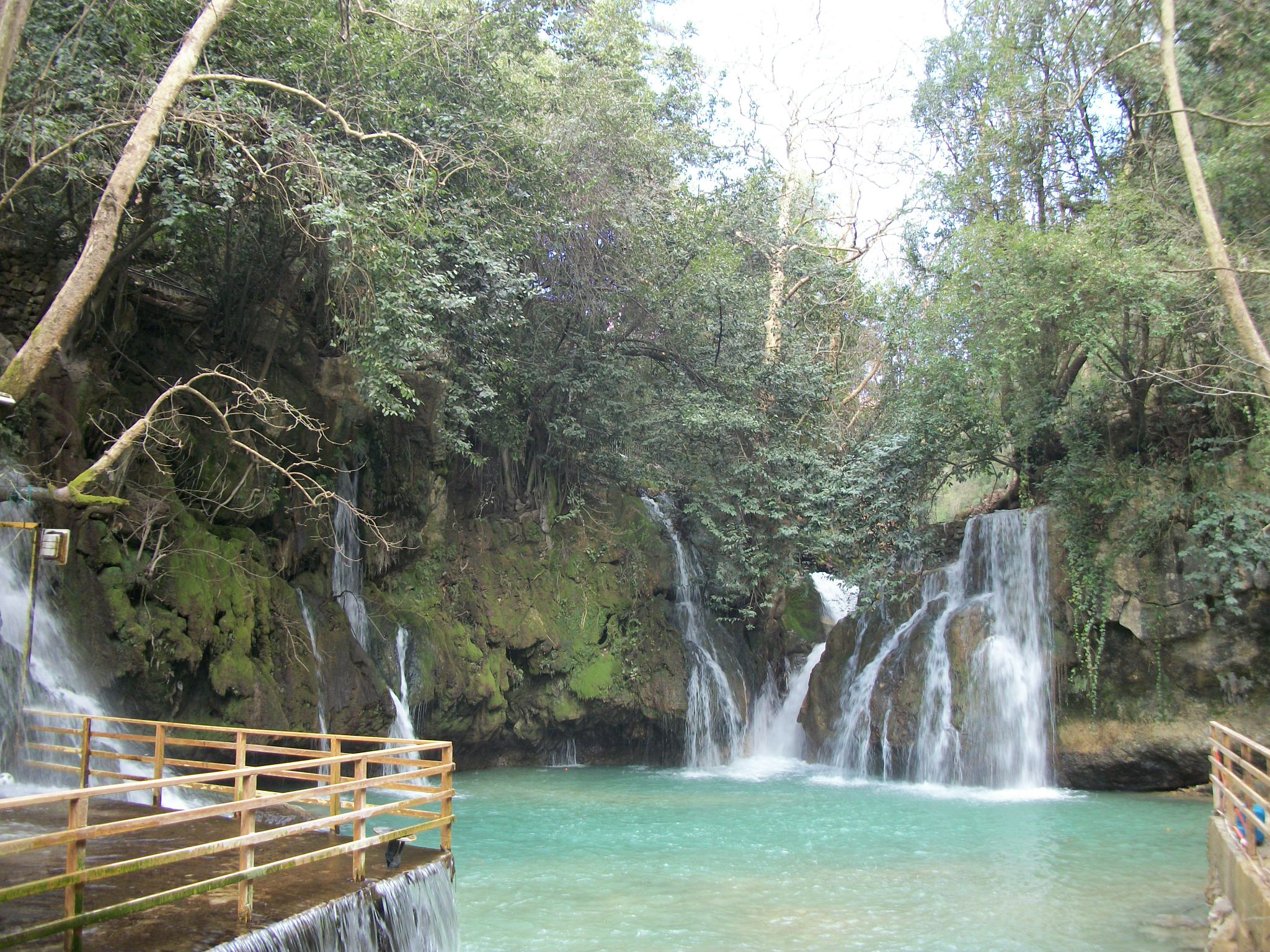
- Blue waterfall of Shallalat Al Zarka

- Location within Lebanon
- Coordinates: 33°40′47″N 35°33′30″E
- Country: Lebanon
- Governorate: Mount Lebanon Governorate
- District: Chouf District

Government

Area
  - Total: 14 km^{2} (5.4 sq mi)
- Highest elevation: 915 m (3,002 ft)
- Lowest elevation: 750 m (2,460 ft)

Population
  - Total: 17,000
  - Density: 1,200/km^{2} (3,100/sq mi)
- Time zone: UTC+2 (EET)
  - Summer (DST): UTC+3 (EEST)
- Dialing code: +961
- Website: www.baakleen.com

Baakline, also spelled Baakleen or Baaqlîne (Arabic: بعقلين, romanized: Baʿqlīn), is a town in the Chouf District of Mount Lebanon Governorate, Lebanon, located about 45 kilometres (28 mi) southeast of Beirut. Situated at an elevation of 850–920 metres (2,790–3,020 ft), it has a population of around 30,000 and covers an area of approximately 14 square kilometres (5.4 sq mi), containing about 2,870 homes. Baakline is the principal town of the Chouf's Druze community and is surrounded by several neighbouring villages, including Deir al-Qamar, Beit ed-Dine, Ainbal, Deir Dourit, Symkanieh, and Jahlieh.

== History ==
Founded in the 12th century by the Maan emirs, Baakline served as their capital until the early 17th century when its most famous Emir Fakhreddin II, moved to Deir el Qamar. Today, Baakline is an important Druze city. The beautiful grand serail, the main administrative building of Baakline before World War II, has been restored and transformed into a public library. In the area of the Serail are some Druze religious buildings of the 18th and 19th centuries, including, ancient tombs and Ain Aldiaa water source.

The roots of Lebanon as we know it today go back to Baakline. Around the year 1120 A.D., Amir Maan Ibn Rabeaah, the great grandfather of Amir Fakher Eddine Al Maani the second who established “Lubnan Al Kabeer”, settled in Baakleen. He was supported by his in-laws, the Tanoukhyeen. Amir Maan was married to the daughter of Amir Noaaman Al Tanoukhy. Historians agree that Baakleen was the capital of the Maani Emirate.

Due to water shortages in Baakline, the Maani Amirs were attracted to Neighboring Deir Al Kamar (according to Druze archives, called Dar Al Kamar), where they built many palaces and a mosque that still stands in the middle of the town square carrying the name of Amir Fakher Eddine Ibn Othman Ibn Al Hajj Younis Al Maani (1493 AD). The last of the Maan family Amirs was Amir Ahmad who died in 1697 A.D. and with his death, the rulers of the Emirate became the Shihab family who were tied to the Maan family through intermarriages and alliances.

Under the Ottoman rule, Baakline came back to the forefront as one of the “Qasabat” or major towns. It served as the summer capital for the Druze “Qaem Makqam” or the local governor in the name of the Ottoman Sultan.

On 21 April 2020, nine people were killed.

== Demographics ==
In 2014, Druze made up 97.25% of registered voters in Baakleen.

== Waterfalls and river ==
=== Blue waterfalls of Shallalat el Zarka ===
The waterfall is called Shallalat El Zarka, by which the restaurant holds the same name.

One can also see other magnificent waterfall and river in the village of Baakline.

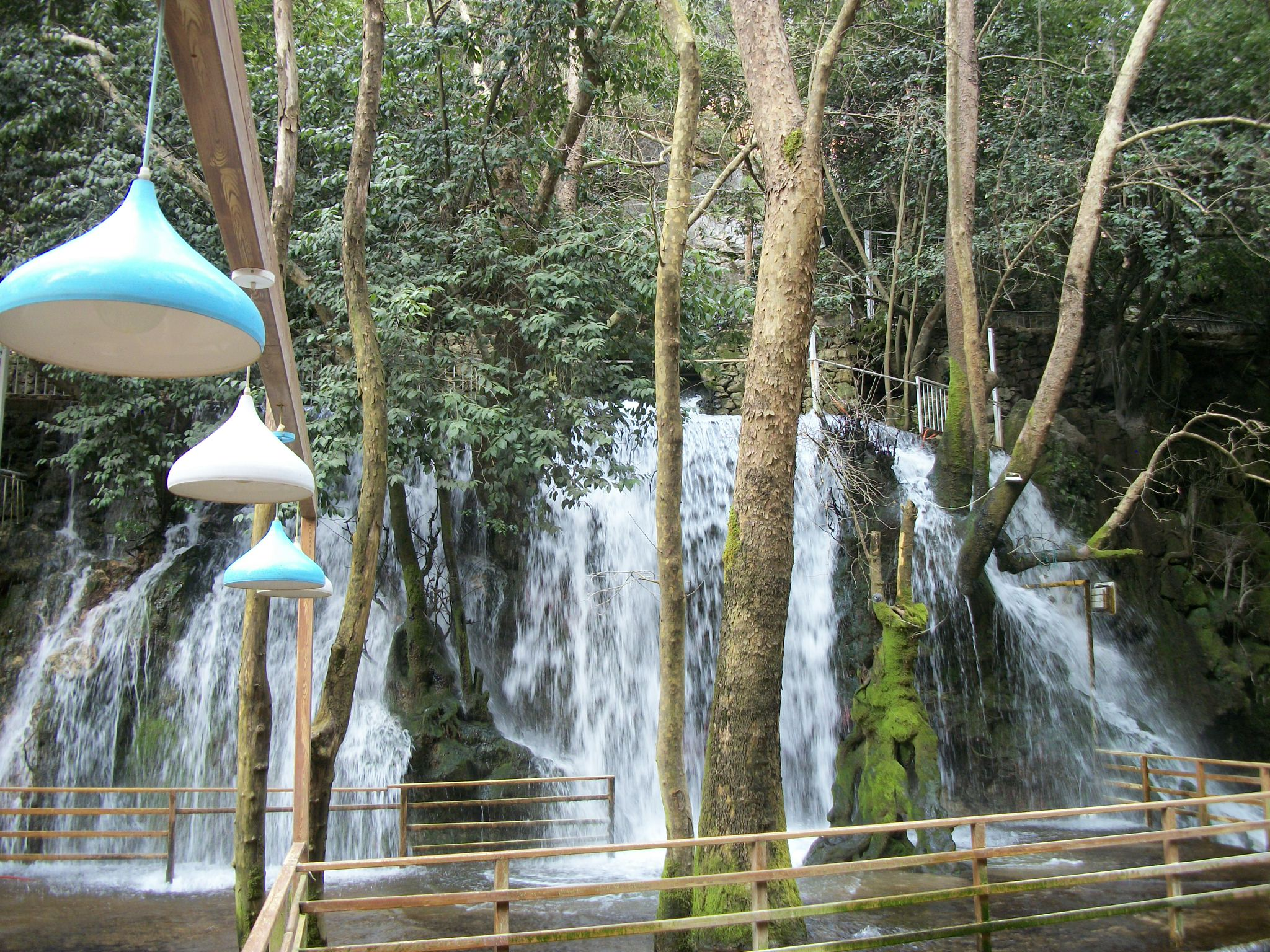
Blue waterfalls of Shallalat el Zarka

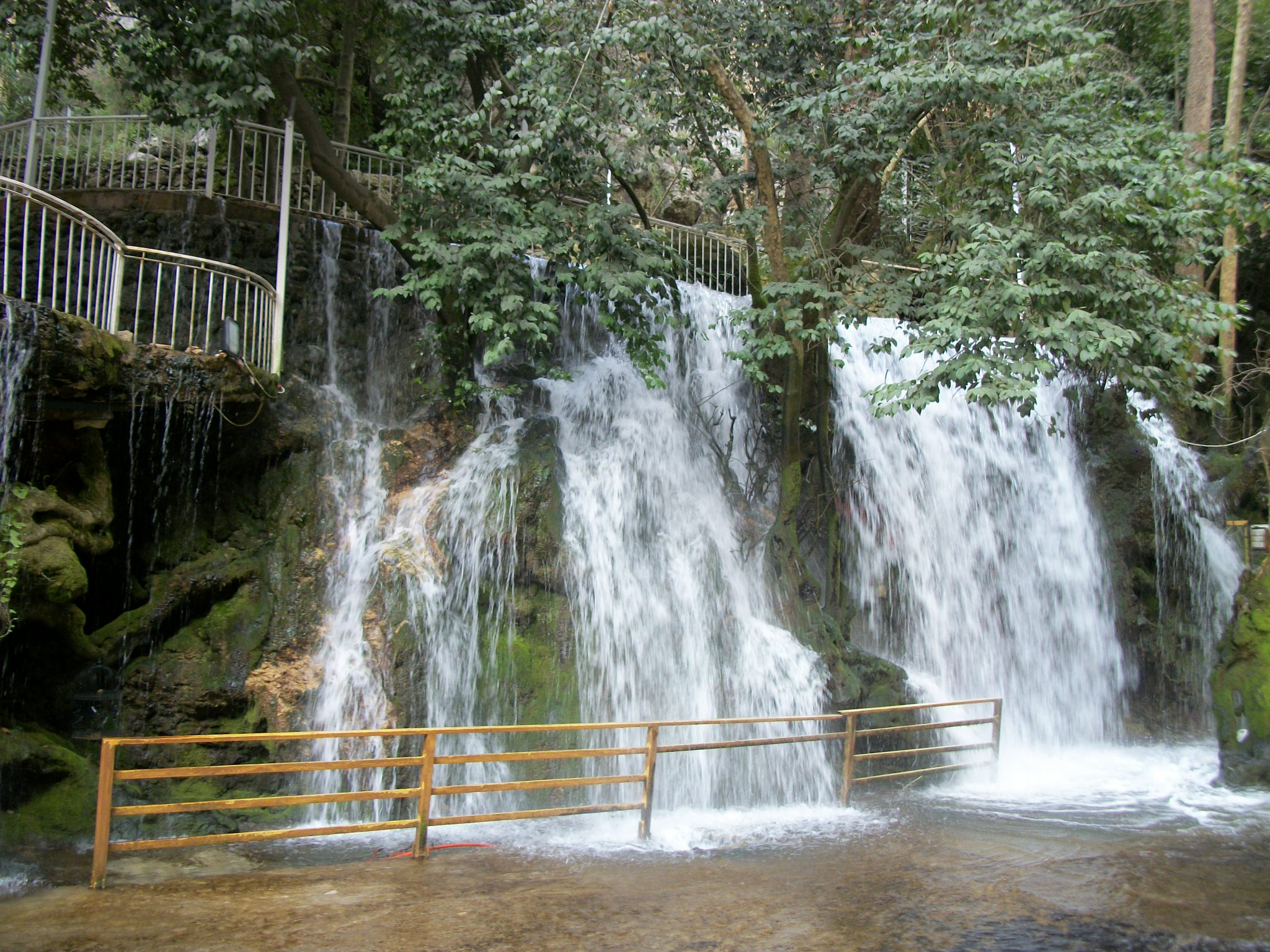
Blue waterfalls of Shallalat el Zarka

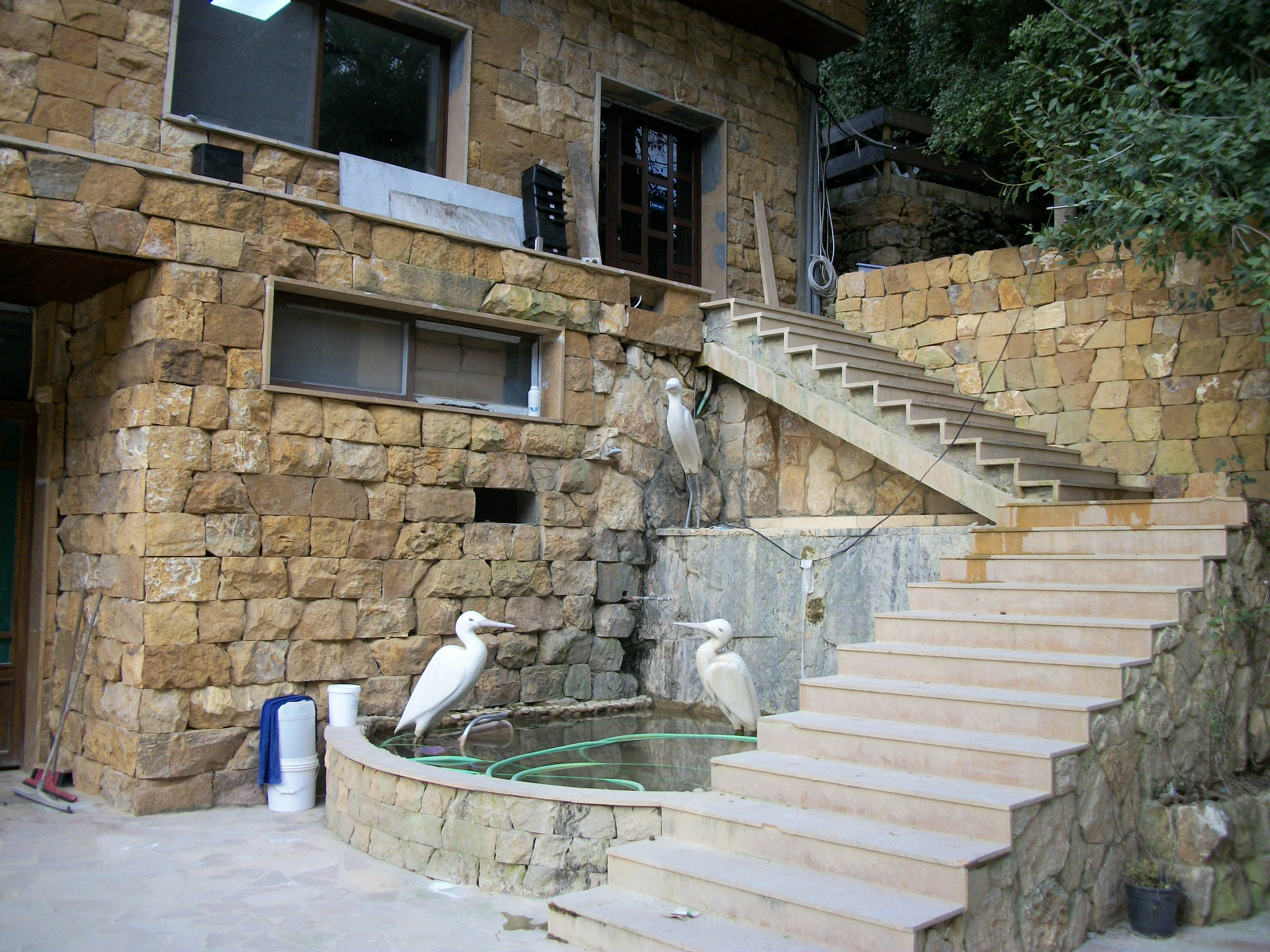

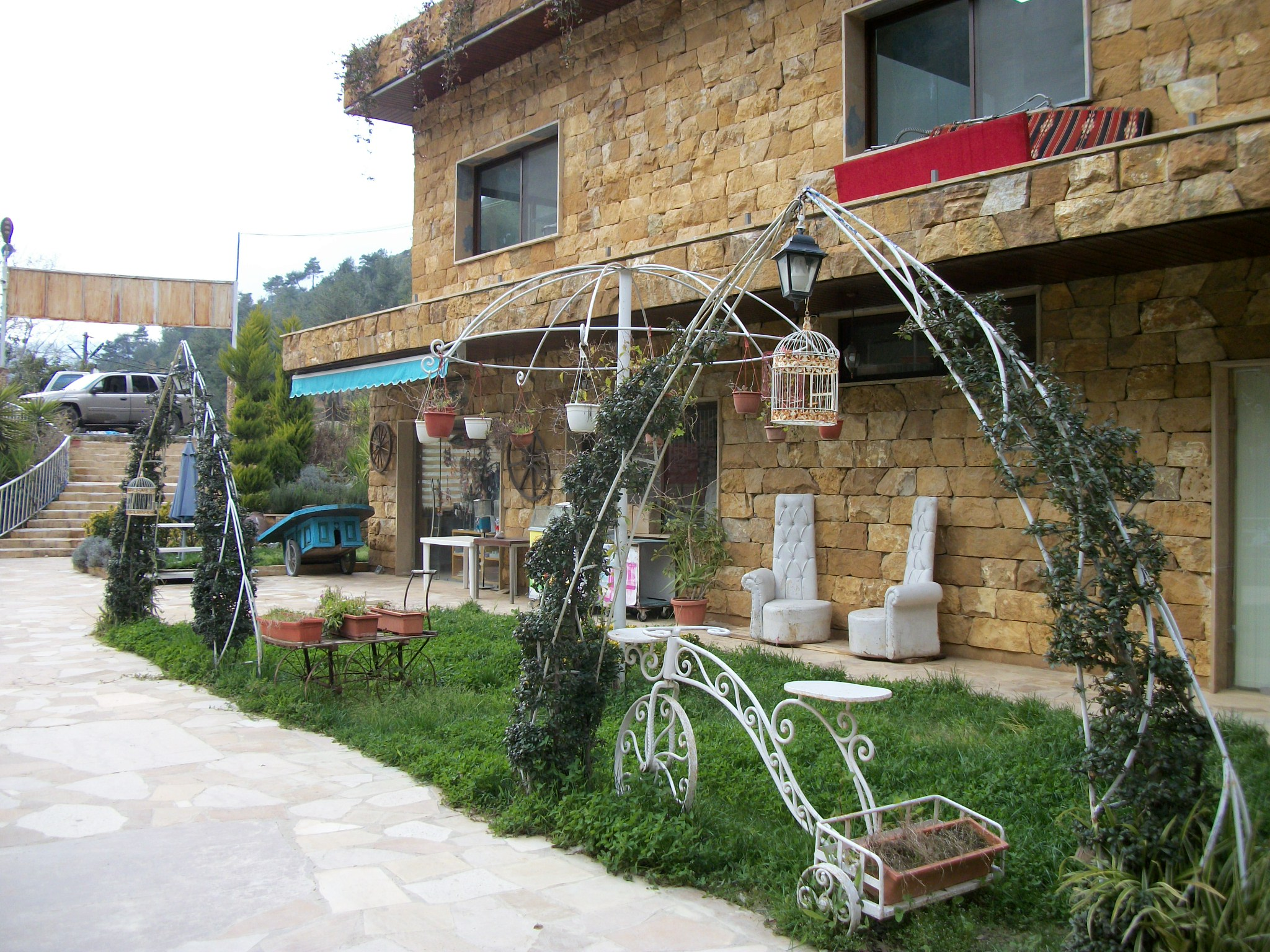
Independent house of the restaurant

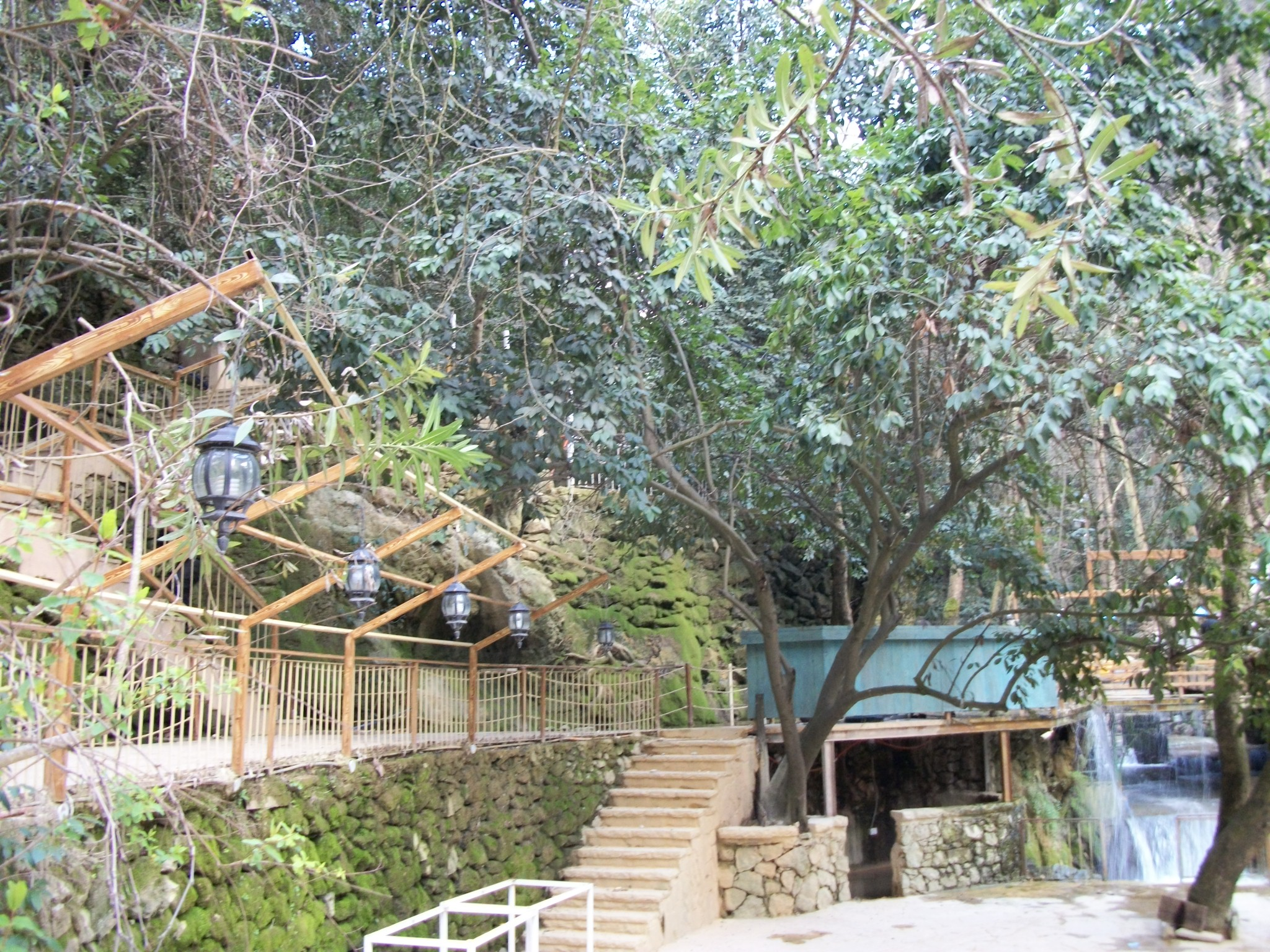
Stairs to access parking at the restaurant through the river and waterfalls

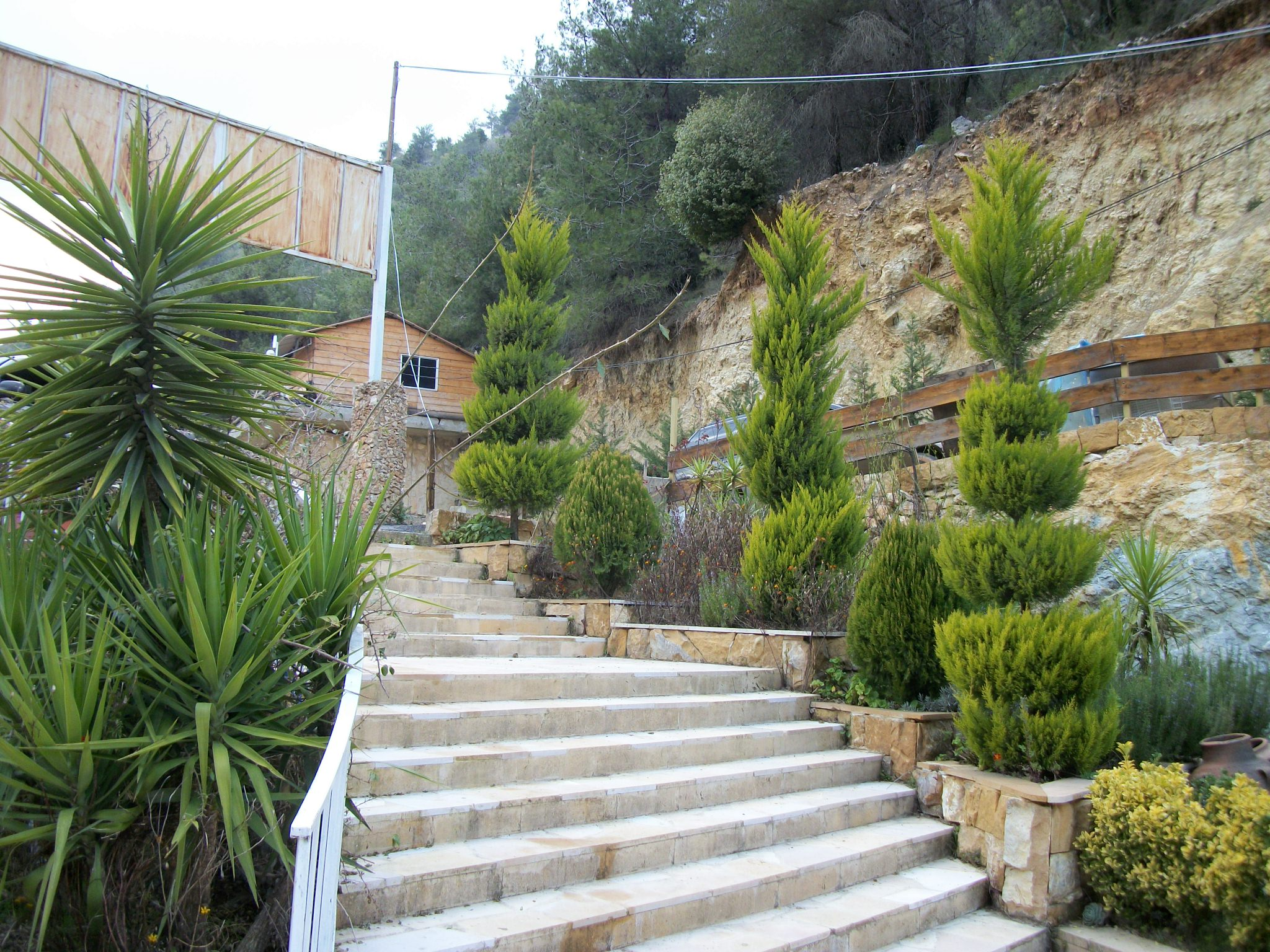
Stairs from parking to independent houses and to the restaurant
