= Aphacitis =

Ancient Greek mythological epithet

Aphacitis (Ancient Greek: Ἀφακῖτις) was an epithet of the goddess Aphrodite from Greek mythology, derived from the town of Aphaca (modern Afqa) in Coele-Syria, where she had a celebrated temple with an oracle, which was destroyed by the command of the emperor Constantine.

At the temple there was a small pool into which worshippers would throw offerings. If the offerings sank, it was proof they were acceptable to Aphrodite. Delegations would be sent from quite far away to the shrine during festivals to offer donations to the goddess here.
