= Baakline attack =

Killing spree in Lebanon

Baakline massacre
- Location: Baakline, Mount Lebanon Governorate, Lebanon
- Date: 21 April 2020; 3:30 p.m.
- Attack type: Honor killing
- Weapons: AK-47; Pump-action shotgun; Knife
- Deaths: 9
- Accused: Mazen Harfoush

On 21 April 2020 in Baakline, Chouf District, Mount Lebanon Governorate, Lebanon, nine people were killed. Mazen Harfoush is the suspect. His wife is one of those killed.

The killing spree began at 3:30 p.m., when a knife was used to kill Harfoush's wife; then eight other people were shot dead. They include Harfoush's brother, Fawzi Harfoush, who was previously suspected of being an accomplice. Six of the victims were Syrian and the other three Lebanese. Military and local municipal police personnel worked together in the search, setting up a 20-kilometre perimeter around Baakline village. Harfoush was arrested in the evening. The attack is suspected to be an honour killing.
