= Bakaata =

Bakaata بقعاتا Boqaâta, Baq'ata
- Location in Lebanon
- Coordinates: 33°40′13″N 35°35′59″E
- Country: Lebanon
- Governorate: Mount Lebanon
- District: Chouf
- Time zone: UTC+2 (EET)
  - Summer (DST): +3

Bakaata (Arabic: بقعاتا, romanized: Baqʿātā; also spelled Boqaâta or Baq'ata) is a town located in the Chouf District of the Mount Lebanon Governorate, about 45 kilometres (28 mi) southeast of Beirut. Its altitude ranges between 850 m (2,790 ft) – 950 m (3,120 ft) high. Bordering towns include Symkanieh, Ain wa Zein, and Jdeidet El Shouf. Its inhabitants are predominantly Druze.
