= Beirut Baptist School =

- Beirut; Lebanon

Information
- Type: Independent
- Established: 1956
- School district: Msaytbeh, Beirut
- Head of School: Alice Wazir
- Enrollment: Over 1000
- Average class size: 24 students
- Colors: Blue, Yellow & White
- Slogan: "You Shall Know The Truth and The truth will set you free".
- Yearbook: BBS FaceYearBook e-Magazine BBScoop
- Tuition: ± $4500
- Website: www.bbs.edu.lb

Beirut Baptist School (Arabic: المدرسة المعمدانية الإنجيلية) is a Baptist private school in Beirut, Lebanon, founded in 1956 by the Baptist Near East Mission. The school is currently run by Mrs. Alice Wazir. The school is open to students of all religions. Ownership was recently transferred to the Lebanese Society for Educational and Social Development (LSESD). Beirut Baptist School is one of the higher-level and top schools in Lebanon, and is accredited by AdvancED. The school is a complex of 3 buildings: Old Hall (Elementary School), James Ragland Secondary School (Bloc A & Bloc B) and Pre-school Building. In addition to the school's Moussaitbeh Baptist Church. As of 2023, it has a total of 1,450 students.

== History ==
The Baptist Near East Mission, begun by Dr. Finlay Graham and his wife, Julia, began in Lebanon in the early 1950s. In 1956 they founded the Beirut Baptist School. Dr. James Regland was the first principal. Mr. Elias Bitar became the second principal in 1987. Mr. Paul Oueis was the third principal in 2001. Pierre Michel Rahal was entrusted with the administration of the school in 2011 but since 2015 the school is run by Mr.Tony Haddad and Ms. Alice Wazir. The Baptist Near East Mission recently transferred the ownership of the school to the Lebanese Society for Educational and Social Development. From its modest beginnings in a small two-story building in 1954, the school grew to fill a 6700 m2 plot of prime real estate in the heart of Beirut.

== School Board ==
- Dr. Nabil Costa (Executive Director of LSESD)
- Ms. Alice Wazir (Principal)
- Rev. Reichardt Lutz
- Dr. Cedar Mansour (chairperson)
- Timothy Sawwah

== Campus ==
Beirut Baptist School campus is made up of a total of 4 buildings. 1. The Old Hall houses the school's administration, principal's office and financial counter. It also hosts all classes for elementary and intermediate education programs (Grade 1 to Grade 9). In addition to having an arts room, computer lab clinic, teacher's room, supervisor and administrators offices, and the school's counselling department. 2. The James Ragland Building is home for all secondary classes, ranging from Grade 10 to Grade 12. The building also hosts offices of the secondary school supervisors, teacher's room, computer lab, Michael Khoury Scientific Lab and the school's library. 3. The Pre-school building is active within all early start, nursery and kindergarten educational programs and classes. It also has a clinic and a teacher's room. 4. Moussaitbeh Baptist Church is the school's private church. The church holds great significance in the lives of the BBS students, teachers and administrators. The church holds the school's events, ranging all the way from educational events to private conferences and celebrations. Along with hosting weekly church prayers on Sundays. 5. BBS campus is also made of 9 grounds, split in accordance to the students' class level, mainly used for breaks and recess, along with hosting school events, such as; Independence Day and Science & Math Fair.

== See also ==
- List of schools in Lebanon
