= Hagop Panossian =

Armenian aerospace engineer, academic and philanthropist

- Յակոբ Փանոսեան
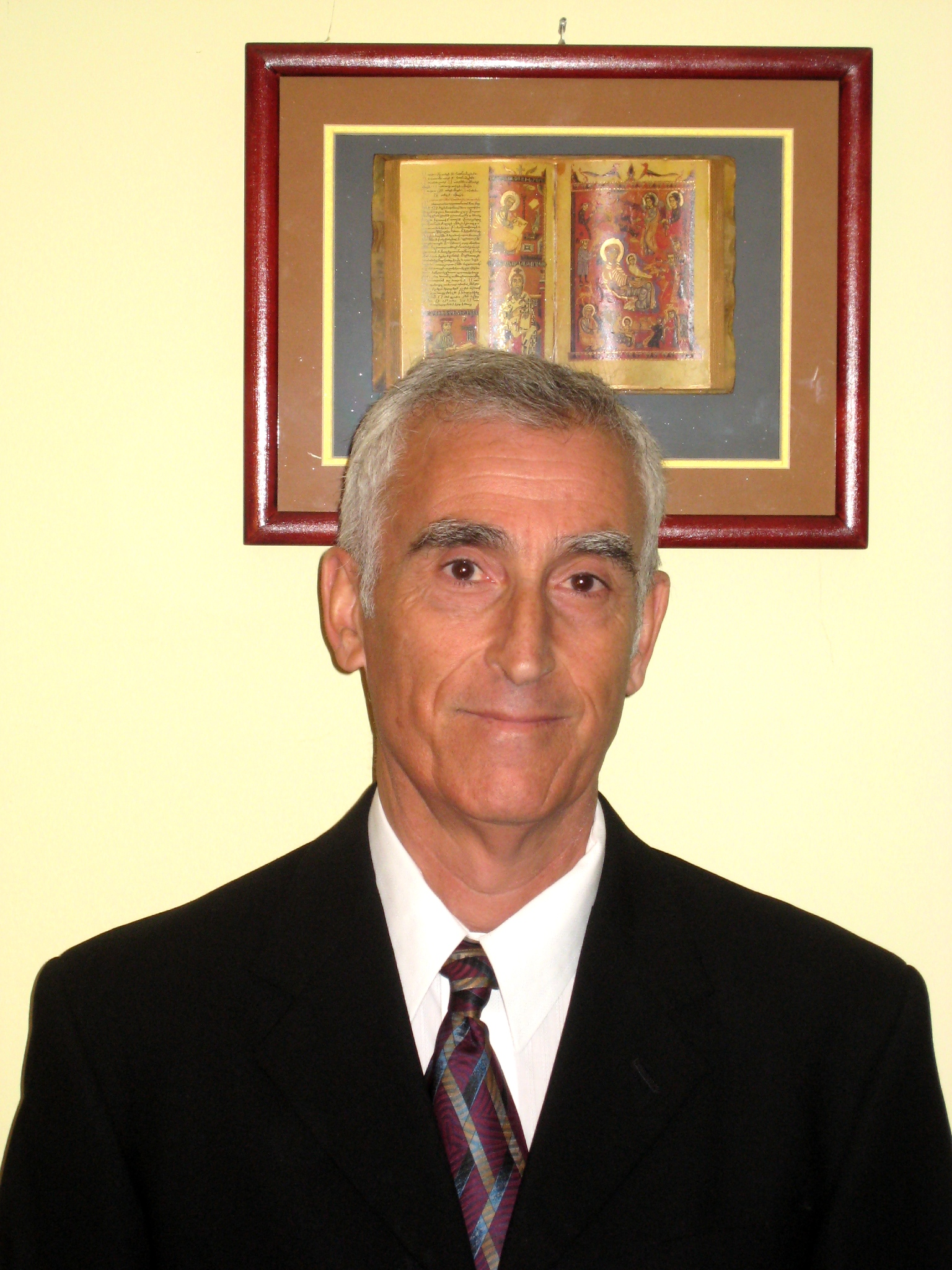
- Born: 8 June 1946 (age 80); Anjar, Lebanon
- Education: American University of Beirut; University of South Carolina; University of California, Los Angeles
- Occupations: Aerospace engineer, academic

Hagop Vartevar Panossian (Armenian: Յակոբ Փանոսեան; born 8 June 1946) is an Armenian aerospace engineer, academic and philanthropist with over 30 years of experience in rocket engine control and modeling, large space structures, actuation systems, failure detection, stochastic systems, vibration damping and optimal and adaptive control. Since founding the ARPA Institute in 1992, he has served as its president and remains actively involved in its wide range of initiatives.

== Early life and education ==
Panossian was born in Anjar, Lebanon, and received his primary and secondary education from the Armenian Evangelical Secondary School of Anjar. In 1969, he graduated with a Bachelor of Science in mathematics from the American University of Beirut. For five years, Panossian taught mathematics and sciences at the Calousd Gulbengian Secondary School, before moving to the United States at the age of 28.

He earned a master's degree in applied mathematics from the University of South Carolina in 1974, and a doctorate in engineering from the University of California, Los Angeles in 1981.

== Career ==
=== Work in aerospace engineering ===
From 1981 to 1987, Panossian worked at Textron, and since 1987, he has worked at Rockwell International, Rocketdyne, Boeing, and Pratt & Whitney, specialising in rocket systems and emerging high-frequency oscillations for space shuttle engines. Notably, he programmed the control law for the X33 Aerospike engine, and proposed an innovative method for managing high-frequency oscillations in engine parts and ensuring stability at low temperatures.

In 1987, he was selected by the Fulbright Association as an exchange scientist in Armenia for four months and taught on automatic control systems at Yerevan State University and Polytechnic universities.

In 2008, he was elected a foreign member of the National Academy of Sciences of Armenia.

Panossian has served as an adjunct professor at California State University, Northridge in the Mechanical Engineering Department. He is also an Associate Technical Fellow of the American Institute of Aeronautics and Astronatics, a Senior Member of the Institute of Electrical and Electronics Engineers, and a Fellow of the Institute for the Advancement of Engineering (IAE).

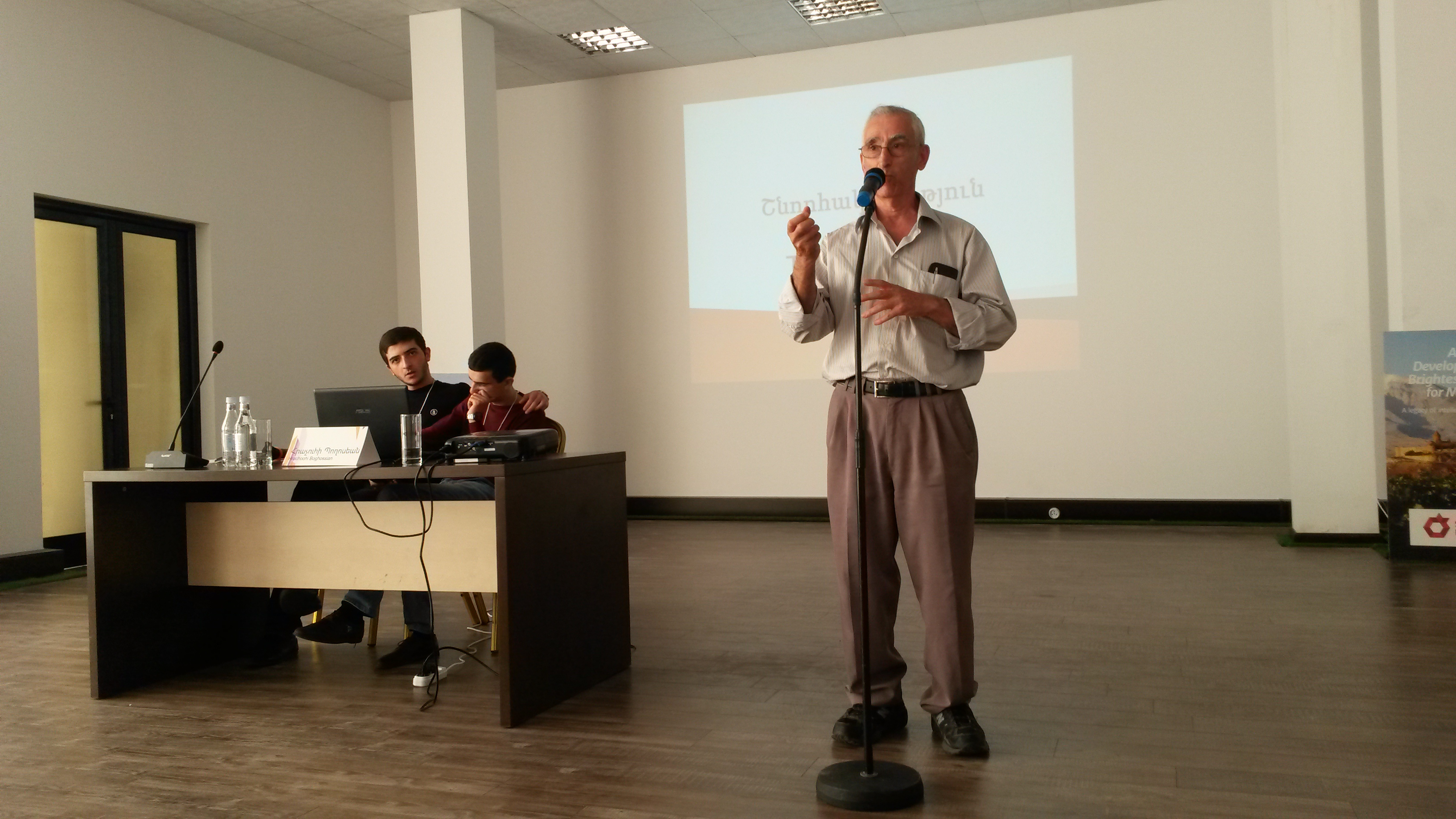
Hagop Panossian during DigiTech 2016

=== Non-profit organizations ===
Panossian has founded two non-profit philanthropic organizations in Los Angeles.

In 1983, he founded the Armenian Engineers and Scientists of America (AESA) and served as its president in 1987 and 1988.

In 1992, he founded the ARPA Institute (Analysis, Research & Planning for Armenia) and continues to serve as its president, coordinating lectures, invention competitions, awards and other programs. The Institute promotes international cooperation between the Republic of Armenia and the Armenian diaspora through consulting, analysis and research across various fields including education, economics, medicine, law, history and technologies.

Panossian has been actively involved in Armenia, leading initiatives through the ARPA Institute. He has helped in the modernization of Armenia's blood services system and education of youth about health risks of smoking and substance abuse. Through his initiatives, the first class 1000 cleanroom was established in the Alikhanyan National Science Laboratory, the first DNA sequencer and various other instruments were donated to the Institute of Molecular Biology, and valuable scientific devices and instruments to institutes of the National Academy of Sciences of Armenia.

Additionally, he organizes, through ARPA, an annual invention competition for young Armenian scientists and monthly lectures and/or panel discussion in Los Angeles, featuring specialists in various fields.

== Personal life ==
Panossian was married to Ani, who died in 2015, and has two sons, Armen and Baruir, and a daughter, Lorig.

== Honours ==
Panossian has received numerous awards, including:

- Rocketdyne President's Award for "Outstanding Achievements in Problem Resolving Through Applying NOPD to Graphic Division Printing Press Cylinders", Rockwell International, (July, 1992)
- "Engineer of the Year" award for "distinguished contributions in developing non obstructive particle damping techniques for reducing severe structural vibrations in a wide range of product applications", Rockwell International (February, 1993)
- Rocketdyne "Engineer of the Year" award "In recognition of outstanding professional contributions to Rocketdyne, the community and to engineering progress" (January, 1993)
- "Distinguished Engineering Achievements" award for "Outstanding contributions to industry, education and government and the entire engineering community", Institute for the Advancement of Engineering (March, 1993)
- Resolution for "remarkable achievements and contributions to the community", Los Angeles City Council Proclamation (April, 2012)

== Publications ==
Some of his publications include:

- Uncertainty Management In Modeling and Control of Large Flexible Structures (1984)
- Optimal Stochastic Modeling and Control of Flexible Structures (1988)
- Real-time failure control (SAFD) (1990)
- X-33 attitude control using the XRS-2200 linear aerospike engine (1999)
- Optimized Non-Obstructive Particle Damping (NOPD) Treatment for Composite Honeycomb Structures (2006)
- Non-Obstructive Particle Damping: New Experiences and Capabilities (2008)
- Modeling Techniques for Evaluating the Effectiveness of Particle Damping in Turbomachinery (2009)
