= Symkanieh =

Semqaniyeh, السمقانية
- City
- Location within Lebanon
- Coordinates: 33°40′52″N 35°35′17″E
- Country: Lebanon
- Governorate: Mount Lebanon Governorate
- District: Chouf District
- Elevation: 920 m (3,020 ft)
- Time zone: UTC+2 (EET)
  - Summer (DST): UTC+3 (EEST)
- Dialing code: +961

Symkanieh (Levantine Arabic: سمقانية, romanized: Semqāniyeh) is a Druze town located in the Chouf District of Mount Lebanon Governorate, about 45 kilometres (28 mi) southeast of Beirut. Its altitude ranges between 850 m (2,790 ft) – 950 m (3,120 ft) high. Bordering Towns: Bakaata and Baakline. Symkanieh is the ancestral seat of the Harmoush Family. It has the ancient ruins of the Palace of sheikh Mahmoud Pasha Harmoush who governed Mount Lebanon Emirate before he was defeated by Emir Haydar Shihab in the Battle of Ain Dara (1711).
