= Lycée Franco-Libanais Nahr Ibrahim =

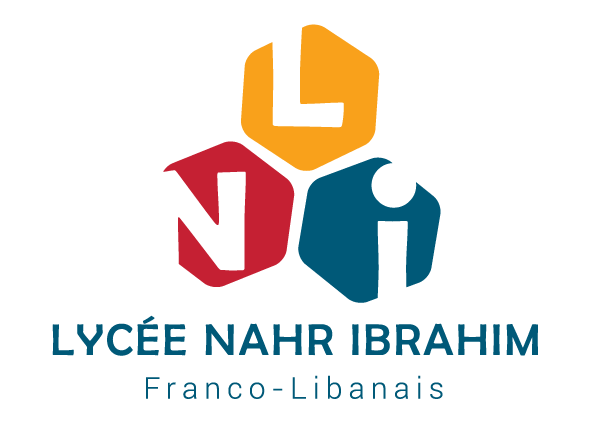

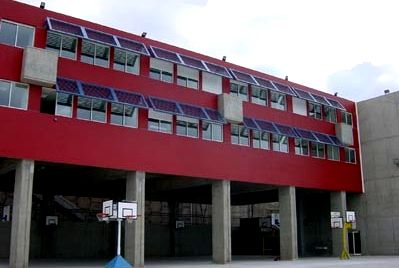
- Laboratory building

Location
- Al Maayssra; B.P. 9589 Jounieh; Lebanon
- Coordinates: 34.067922°N 35.662839°E

Information
- Type: French-International school
- Established: 1992; 34 years ago
- Founder: Mission laïque française
- Principal: Lionel Berger
- Grades: Preschool - 12th Grade
- Enrollment: 1,354 (2017-2018)
- Language: French, Arabic, English, Spanish
- Accreditations: Ministry of Education (Lebanon); Ministère de l'Éducation nationale (France)
- Affiliation: Mission laïque française
- Exam Preparation: French national diploma, Brevet Libanais, Baccalauréat Francais
- Language Certifications: French (DELF), English (Cambridge English)
- Website: www.lflni.edu.lb

The Lycée Franco-Libanais Nahr Ibrahim, LFLNI or LNI is a French primary and secondary school located in Nahr Ibrahim, Lebanon, founded in 1992 by the Mission laïque française. The location of the school overlooks the "Abraham River" (Nahr Ibrahim in Arabic) on a cliff facing the sea.

== Design and history ==
The school consists of three buildings, A and B for grade 6 to grade 12 and one for grade 1 to grade 5. In 1992, a parents' committee and the Mission laïque française agreed to establish the school on a partially-built site in Al-Maayssra whose owner was planning to establish a school in building A. In 1994, high school students began attending school in the newly opened building B. In 2002, a gymnasium and sports field were added, and in 2004, a two-story science laboratory was added.

== Education ==
The school caters for 1,500 pupils between the ages of 3 and 18 and teaches predominantly in French, but the school teaches English, Arabic and Spanish as well. Its curriculum and management are overseen by the French National Ministry of Education through the Agency for the Teaching of French Abroad (AEFE).

== See also ==
- Agency for French Education Abroad
- Education in France
- International school
- List of international schools
- Mission laïque française
- Multilingualism
- Nahr Ibrahim
