= National Evangelical School =

National Evangelical School can refer to:

- Evangelical School of Smyrna
- National Evangelical School (Homs, Syria)
- The National Evangelical School in Nabatieh – NESN
