= Nahr Ibrahim =

River in Lebanon

Coordinates: 34°03′44″N 35°38′32″E

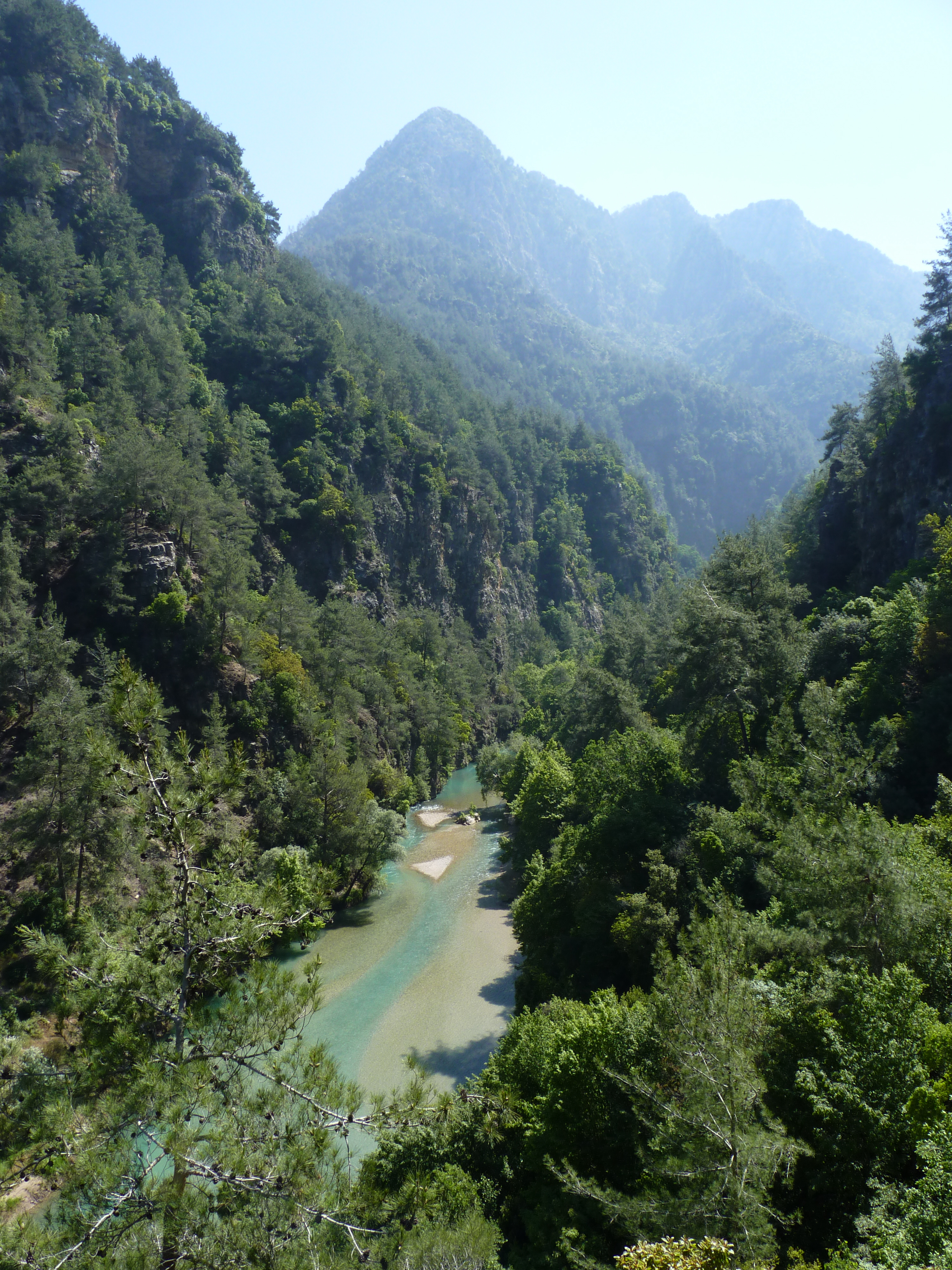

Location
- Towns and villages: Aaqoura, Adonis, Afqa, Ghabat, Yanouh, Qartaba, Janne, Maaysra, Nahr Ibrahim

Physical characteristics
- Source: Mount Lebanon
- Mouth: Mediterranean Sea
  - location: Nahr Ibrahim
- Discharge
  - location: Mediterranean Sea from Nahr Ibrahim
  - average: 16,1 m³/s

Basin features
- Bridges: 1 (Highway M51)

The Nahr Ibrahim (Arabic: نَهر إبراهيم; Abraham River) also known as Adonis River (نَهر أَدونيس), is a small river in the Keserwan-Jbeil Governorate in Lebanon, with a length of about 23 km. The river emerges from two sources: The Roueiss grotto in Aaqoura that provides two thirds the flow of the Nahr Ibrahim and from a huge cavern, the Afqa Grotto, that provides a third of the flow, nearly 1.5 km above sea level before it drops steeply through a series of falls and passes through a sheer gorge through the mountains. It passes through the town of Nahr Ibrahim before emptying into the Mediterranean Sea north of Beirut. The city takes its name from the river (nahr means river in Arabic).

== Association with the cult of Adonis ==
The ancient city of Byblos stood near its outlet and was a site for the veneration of Adonis, the god of love, rebirth, and beauty in Phoenician mythology. He was said to have been killed near the river by a wild boar sent by Ares, the god of war (or by Ares himself disguised as a boar, depending on the version). According to the myth, Adonis's blood flowed in the river, making the water reddish for centuries and spawning a carpet of scarlet buttercups along the river's banks. Indeed, the river flows red each February due to the volume of soil washed off the mountains by heavy winter rains, making it appear that the water is filled with blood.

Due to the river's mythological connections, it was revered in ancient times, and its valley contains the remains of numerous temples and shrines, such as the Roman temple at Yanouh. Even today, local people hang out clothes of sick people at a ruined temple near the river's source hoping to effect cures.

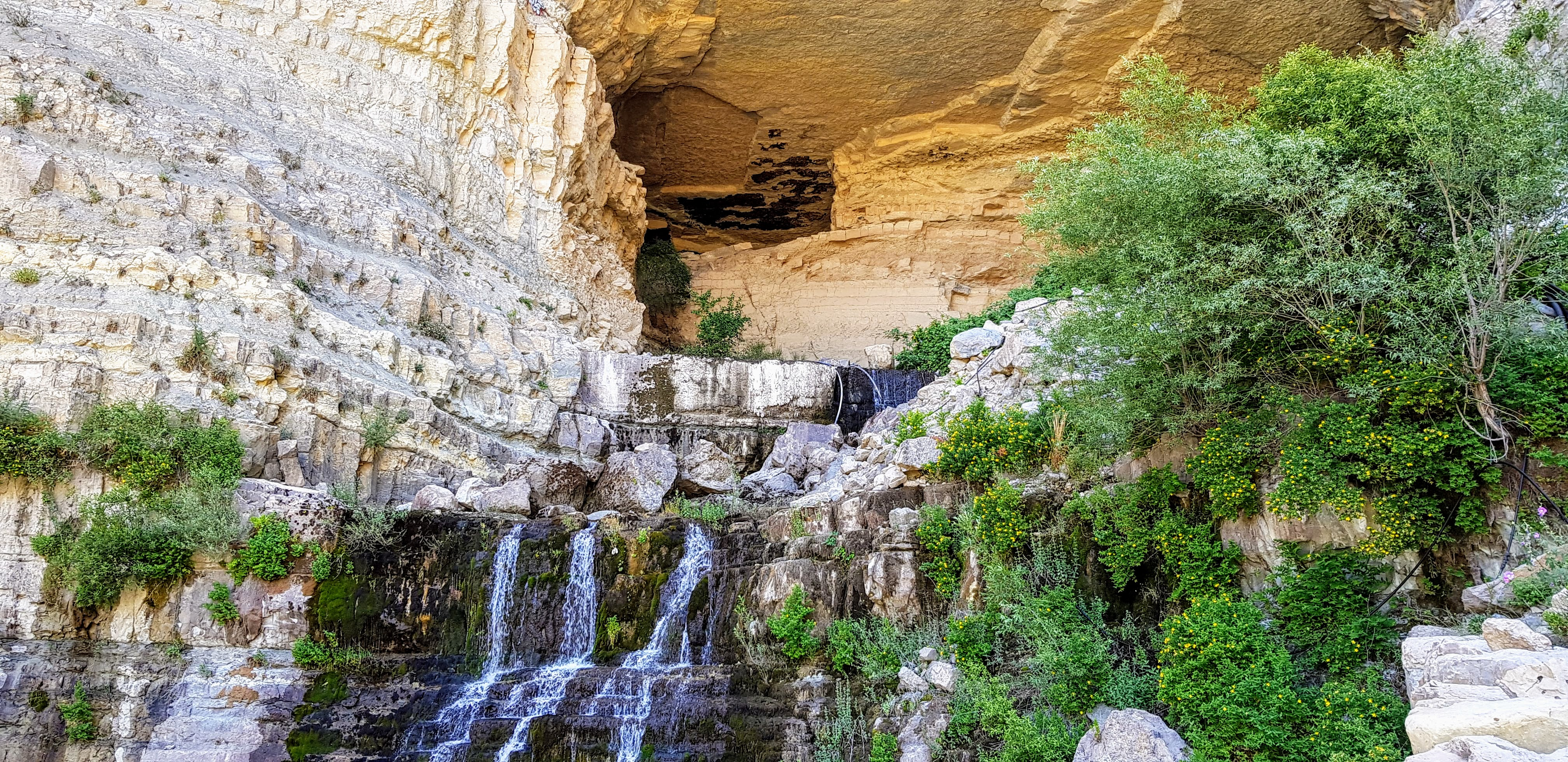
Afqa Grotto

== See also ==
- Abraham of Cyrrhus
- Apheca
- Adonis
- Adonis, Byblos District
