= Amsheet =

Amsheet عمشيت Amchit
- City
- Location within Lebanon
- Coordinates: 34.1500°N 35.6500°E
- Country: Lebanon
- Governorate: Keserwan-Jbeil
- District: Byblos

Area
  - Total: 5.95 km^{2} (2.30 sq mi)
- Elevation: 140 m (460 ft)
- Time zone: UTC+2 (EET)
  - Summer (DST): UTC+3 (EEST)
- Dialing code: +961 09
- Website: www.aamchit.com (Municipality of Amchit)

Amsheet (عمشيت, ʿAmšīt; also spelled Amchit) is a seaside town and municipality in the Byblos District of Keserwan-Jbeil Governorate, Lebanon, about 40 km north of Beirut. The town's average elevation is 140 meters above sea level and its total land area is 595 hectares. Its inhabitants are predominantly Maronites, although there is a Shia Muslim minority.

There are many old churches in Amsheet (more than a hundred and some old synagogues.).

== Demographics ==
Amsheet's population is around 25,000. The majority of the inhabitants are Maronite Christians. However, there is a significant Shia Muslim minority, who largely moved to Amsheet from predominantly Shia villages in the nearby mountains. Most Shia in Amsheet live in the Kfar Saleh neighborhood.

== Economy ==
There are 29 companies in Amsheet that employ at least five people. With the largest one being IPT Group. Amsheet is known for its baskets and mats woven from palm leaves. Olive and citrus fruits are the main agricultural products of the town.

== Education ==
There are two public schools with a total of 966 students in 2006 and three private schools with a total of 1,099 students in Amsheet. Schools in the town include:

- Lycee Amchit, a private school that provides kindergarten through to secondary education, that was established in 1977.

== Landmarks ==
The house of Zakhia family where Ernest Renan stayed, the French philosopher who lived in Amsheet for a long period in the 19th century, can be visited, as can the tomb of his sister who was buried at St. Marie Church in the Zakhia family Cemetery.Also the house of Raphael Lahoud built in 1838, Gabriel Lahoud and Michel Lahoud.The oldest school in Lebanon of Adib Lahoud.

The Church of Saint George was built on an ancient temple and the altar has both Greek and Arabic inscriptions. The adjoining churches of Saint Sophie and Saint Stephen retain their ancient vaulted porches and wall paintings. The churches were built on the remains of a Roman temple.

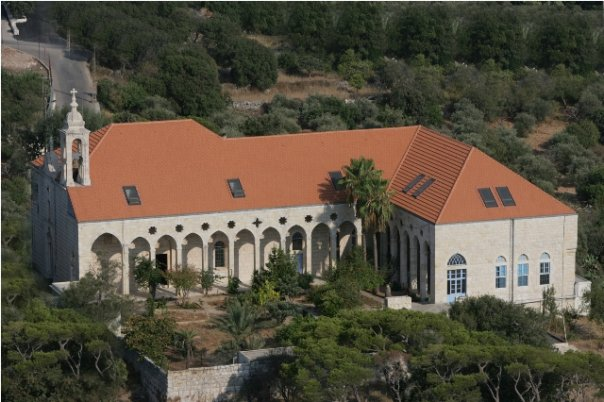
Saint-Michel Amsheet Hospital

The Church of Saint Nicholas (Mar Zakhia) has medieval wall paintings and was built in the 5th century.

== Tourism ==
The town is home to Lebanon's only organized coastal campsite, "Camping Les Colombes", a place with a history since its beginning in the 1950s.

== Environmental issues ==
See Oil pollution from ships in Amchit.

== Notable residents ==
- Michel Suleiman - Former President of the Lebanese Republic
- Charbel Rouhana - singer, composer
- Marcel Khalife - singer, composer
- Aline Lahoud - singer and actress
- Elsa Zgheib - Actress
- Salwa Al Katrib - stage actress and singer
- Marwan Khoury - Singer and composer
- 'Afifa Karam - Novelist and journalist
- Sabah Khoury - Basketball player
- Tony Issa - Actor
- Victor Khoury - Former Minister and Military Commander
