= Ainbal =

Ainbal عينبال
- Municipality
- Location in Lebanon
- Coordinates: 33°39′43″N 35°33′42″E
- Country: Lebanon
- Governorate: Mount Lebanon
- District: Chouf

Area
  - Total: 3.6 km^{2} (1.4 sq mi)
- Elevation: 850 m (2,790 ft)

Population
  - Total: 1,813
- (Registered voters)
- Time zone: UTC+2 (EET)
  - Summer (DST): UTC+3 (EEST)
- Dialing code: +961

Ainbal (Arabic: عينبال, romanized: ʿAynbāl) is a village and municipality in the Chouf District of the Mount Lebanon Governorate in Lebanon. It is located 50 kilometers southeast of Beirut. Its average elevation is 850 meters above sea level and its total land area is 360 hectares. In 2010, Ainbal had 1,813 registered voters. Ainbal's inhabitants are predominantly Druze.

Among several theories regarding the village name's origin is that is derived from the Aramaic word for "divine eye". In Ainbal's immediate vicinity are numerous caves and the ruins of Kouroum el-Qarya (Vineyard Village), which are situated on a hill above the village.
