= Afqa =

Village in Byblos District, Lebanon

Afqa Apheca, Afeca, Afka
- Village
- Interactive map of Afqa
- Country: Lebanon
- Governorate: Keserwan-Jbeil
- District: Byblos District

Area
  - Total: 9.34 km^{2} (3.61 sq mi)
- Elevation: 1,200 m (3,900 ft)

Afqa Grotto
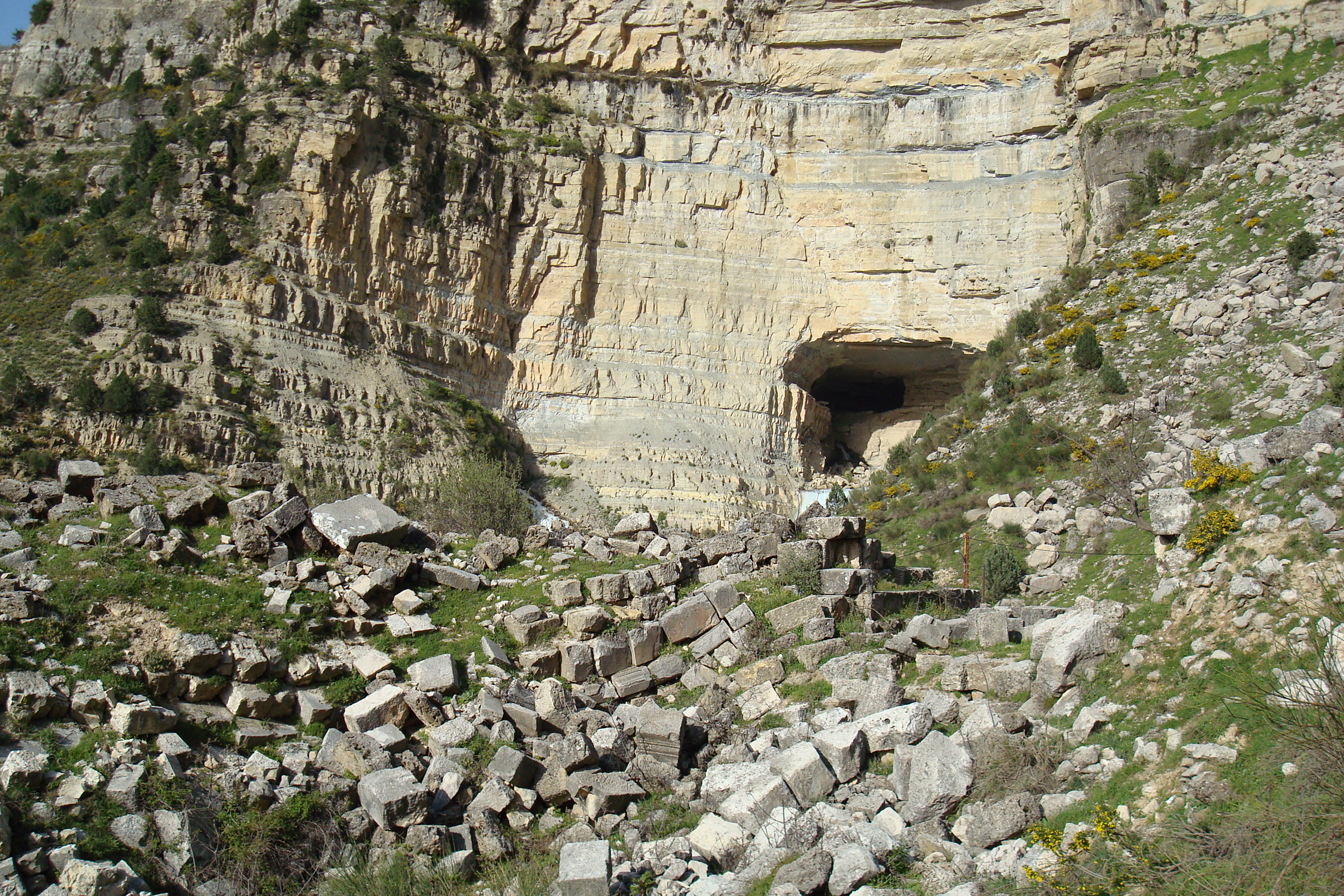

- Location within Lebanon
- 34.069167°N 35.886111°E
- Cultures: Roman, Ancient Greece, Phoenicia
- Location: 71 kilometres (44 mi) northeast of Beirut
- Region: Byblos District

Site notes
- Condition: Ruins
- Public access: Yes

Afqa (Arabic: افقا; also spelled Afka) is a village and municipality located in the Byblos District of the Keserwan-Jbeil Governorate, 71 kilometres (44 mi) northeast of Beirut in Lebanon. It has an average elevation of 1,200 meters above sea level and a total land area of 934 hectares. Its inhabitants are predominantly Shia Muslims.

== History ==
Known in ancient times as Aphaca (Ancient Greek: Ἄφακα), which can be interpreted as "source". It was possibly an early sanctuary of El. Marvin H. Pope identified the home of El in the Ugaritic texts of ca. 1200 BCE, described as "at the source[s] of the [two] rivers, amid the fountains of the [two] deeps", with this famous source of the river Adonis and Yammoune, an intermittent lake on the other side of the mountain, which Pope asserted was closely associated with it in legend.

Aphaca was more like a Delphi, a sacred sanctuary than a town, consisting of a collection of temples dedicated primarily to Astarte, also known as Beltis or Baaltis, whose worship was described by ancient sources as so sexually licentious that Constantine eventually prohibited its practices. Eusebius confirms that the worship of Astarte at Aphaca was notorious for sexual excess, with effeminate men participating in rituals intended to honor the goddess through sexual acts.

In Greek mythology, Adonis was born and died at the foot of the falls in Afqa. The ruins of the celebrated temple of Aphrodite Aphakitis— the Aphrodite particular to this site— are located there. Sir Richard Francis Burton and Sir James Frazer further attribute the temple at Afqa to the honouring of Astarte or Ishtar (Ashtaroth). Afqa is aligned centrally between Baalbek and Byblos, pointing to the summer solstice sunset over the Mediterranean. It is from Byblos that the myth was told of a mystical ark that came ashore containing the bones of Osiris. The ark became stuck in a swamp until Isis found it and carried it back to Ancient Egypt. Ottoman tax records, which did not differentiate different Muslim groups from each other, indicate Afqa, or "Ifqi", had 20 Muslim households and six bachelors in 1523, 38 Muslim households and five bachelors in 1530, and 25 Muslim households and 15 bachelors in 1543.

The Afaq archaeological sites were amongst 34 cultural heritage properties given enhanced protection by UNESCO to safeguard them during the Israeli invasion of Lebanon in 2024.

=== 2006 Lebanon War ===
During the 2006 Lebanon War, the Afqa bridge that connects Mount Lebanon with the Beqaa Valley was one of five bridges destroyed by Israeli jets.

== Physical description ==
Afqa is located in the mountains of Lebanon, about 20 kilometres from the ancient city of Byblos, just east of the town of Qartaba. It is the site of one of the finest waterfalls in the mountains of the Levant, which feeds into the Adonis River (also known as Abraham River), and forms Lake Yammoune, with which it is also associated by legend.

The waterfall at Afqa is the source for the River Adonis and is located on a 600-foot (180 m) bluff that forms an immense natural amphitheater. The river emerges from a large limestone cave in the cliff wall which stores and channels water from the melted snow of the mountains before releasing it into springs and streams below. At Afqa, several watery threads flow from the cave to form numerous cataracts, a scene of great beauty. The cave has over two miles (three km) of known passageways inside.

A great and ancient temple is located here, where the goddess Aphrodite was worshipped. Eusebius, the biographer of emperor Constantine I, wrote that the emperor ordered to demolish the Temple. Frazer attributes its construction to the legendary forebear of King Cinyras, who was said to have founded a sanctuary for Aphrodite (i.e. Astarte). Reconstructed on a grander scale in Hellenistic times, then destroyed by the Emperor Constantine the Great in the fourth century, it was partially rebuilt by the later fourth-century emperor, Julian the Apostate. The site was finally abandoned during the reign of Theodosius I Massive hewn blocks and a fine column of Syenite granite still mark the site, on a terrace facing the source of the river.

The remains of a Roman aqueduct that carried the waters of the River Adonis to the inhabitants of ancient Byblos are also located here.

Edward Robinson and Eli Smith camped at the site in 1852, merely remarking on its "shapeless ruins" and the difficulty of transport of two massive columns of Syenite granite. Frazer describes the village at Afqa in his 1922 book, The Golden Bough as:

"...the miserable village which still bears the name of Afqa at the head of the wild, romantic, wooded gorge of the Adonis. The hamlet stands among groves of noble walnut trees on the brink of the lyn. A little way off the river rushes from a cavern at the foot of a mighty amphitheater of towering cliffs to plunge in a series of cascades into the awful depths of the glen. The deeper it descends, the ranker and denser grows the vegetation, which, sprouting from the crannies and fissures of the rocks, spreads a green veil over the roaring or murmuring stream in the tremendous chasm below. There is something delicious, almost intoxicating, in the freshness of these tumbling waters, in the sweetness and purity of the mountain air, in the vivid green of the vegetation.

== Mythology ==
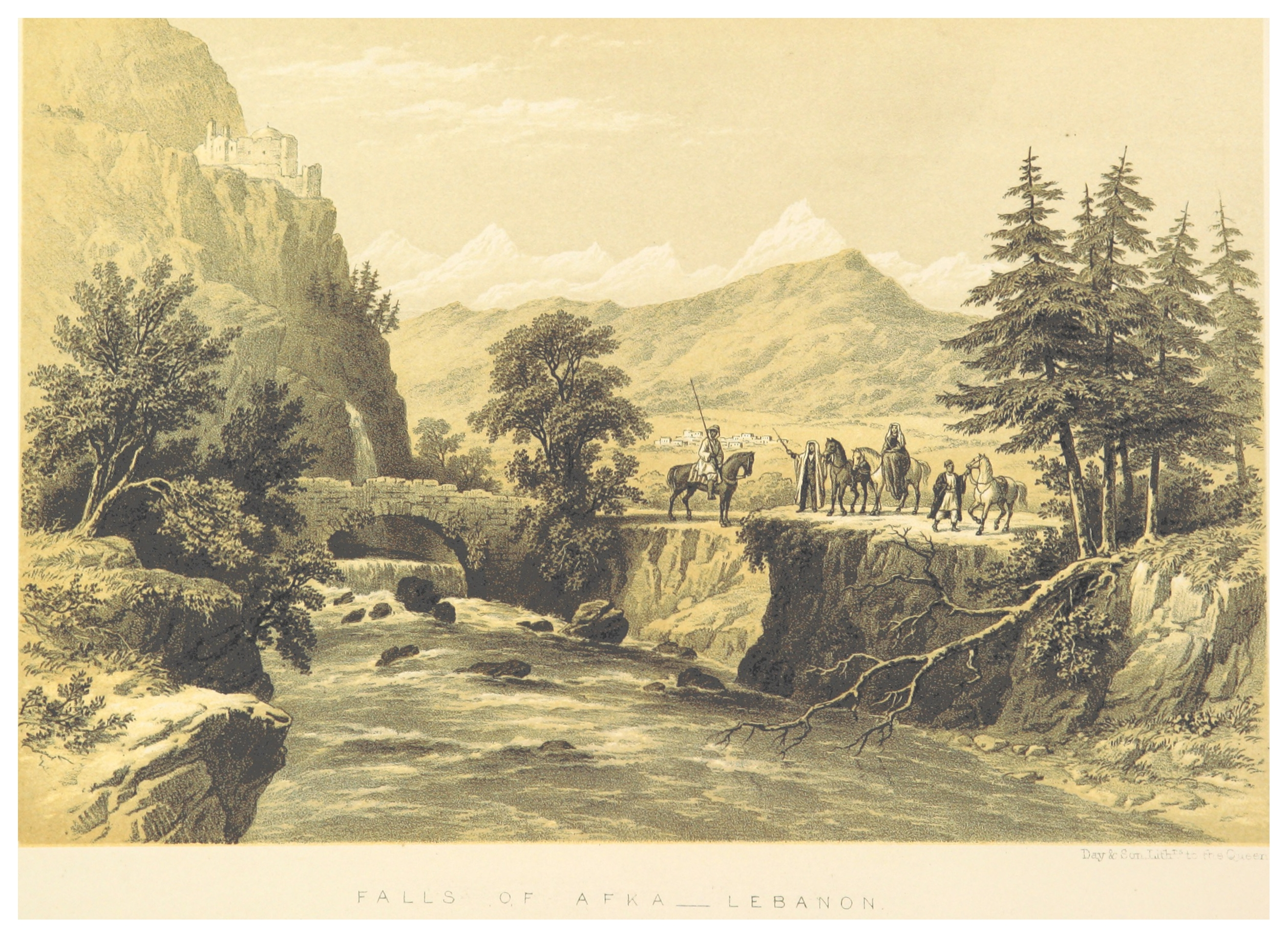
The Falls of Afka, with an ancient bridge (c.1860)

In classical Greek mythology, Afqa is associated with the cult of Aphrodite and Adonis. According to the myth, Cinyras, the King of Cyprus seduced his daughter Myrrha who was transformed into a tree that bears her name (see:Myrrh). After several months, the tree split open and the child Adonis emerged. He was reared by Aphrodite, who became enamored of him, causing her lover Ares to grow jealous. Ares sent a vicious boar to kill Adonis. At the pool at the foot of the falls of Afqa, Adonis bled to death from a deep wound in the groin. Aphrodite despaired at his death and out of pity for her the gods allowed Adonis to ascend from Hades for a short period each year.

Each spring at Afqa, the melting snows flood the river, bringing a reddish mud into the stream from the steep mountain slopes. The red stain can be seen feeding into the river and far out to the Mediterranean Sea. Legend held this to be the blood of Adonis, renewed each year, at the time of his death. Lucian of Samosata, a Syrian by birth, describes how a local man of Byblos debunked the legend:

"'This river, my friend and guest, passes through the Libanus: now this Libanus abounds in the red earth. The violent winds which blow regularly on those days bring down into the river a quantity of earth resembling vermilion. It is this earth that turns the river to red. And thus the change in the river's colour is due, not to blood as they affirm, but to the nature of the soil.' This was the story of the man of Byblos. But even assuming that he spoke the truth, yet there certainly seems to me something supernatural in the regular coincidence of the wind and the colouring of the river."

Lucian also describes practices by the Byblians of worship which some told him centered not on Adonis, but Osiris. He writes that he mastered the secret rites of Adonis at the temple at Afqa and that the locals there asserted that the legend about Adonis was true and occurred in their country. Lucian describes the rites, annually performed, that involved the beating of breasts and wailing, and the "perform[ing] [of] their secret ritual amid signs of mourning through the whole countryside. When they have finished their mourning and wailing, they sacrifice in the first place to Adonis, as to one who has departed this life: after this they allege that he is alive again, and exhibit his effigy to the sky."

Also in the fertile valley surrounding the river, millions of scarlet anemones bloom. Known as Adonis' flowers, according to legend, they spring from his blood, spilled as he lay dying beneath the trees at Afqa, and return each year in remembrance.

In his "Terminal Essay" in the 1885 translation of The Arabian Nights, Burton describes the temple at Afqa as a place of pilgrimage for the Metawali sect of Shia Islam, where vows are addressed to the Sayyidat al-Kabirah or "the Great Lady". In the early 20th century, strips of white cloth were still being attached to the ancient fig that shadows the source, and Metawalis and Christians alike were bringing the sick to be cured at "the abode of Sa’īdat Afkā, i.e. a feminine spirit of the same name as the place. Her husband built this temple. He was killed by a wild beast, and she searched among the mountains until she found his mangled body. This is evidently a modified view of the ancient myth of Astarte and Adonis," Lewis Bayles Paton reported in 1919, with a photograph of the cloth-hung fig tree. W. F. Albright noted this survival of this "female saint" as the most remarkable among "very few direct reflections of paganism in the names and legends of modern welis."

== Bibliography ==
- Bakhit, Muhammad Adnan Salamah (February 1972). The Ottoman Province of Damascus in the Sixteenth Century (PhD). School of Oriental and African Studies, University of London.
