= Paul Zgheib =

Lebanese photographer (born 1959)

Paul Zgheib (born 1959) is a Lebanese photographer.

== Life and Career ==
Zgheib is originally from Byblos.

He studied photography at the French School of Visual Communications (EFET) in Paris. Considered one of the leading photographers in Lebanon and the Levant, Zgheib currently teaches photography at the Université Saint-Esprit de Kaslik.
