= Lycee Amchit =

- (Lebanon) Amsheet; Lebanon

Information
- Type: Private
- Established: 1977
- Gender: Co-educational
- Language: Arabic French English
- Website: Official website

Lycee Amchit is a private school that provides kindergarten, primary, complementary and secondary teaching. The main campus is located in the town of Amsheet, Lebanon. It covers an area of 10,000 square metres.

== History ==
The School was founded in 1977 during the Lebanese Civil War by a psychologist (Claire Gedeon) and a specialized educator (Georges Gedeon) who fled from the war in the capital Beirut and settled in Amsheet.

== Organisation ==
Lycee Amchit educates students from the age of 3 years. The primary languages are Arabic and French. English is taught as a secondary language. Although secular, the school offers courses in religious education.

== Extracurricular activities ==
The school participated in the 2008 Model United Nations. They gave a dance performance at the 12th Annual Science and Arts Fair, on 7 May 2010, held at Lebanese American University, Byblos.
