= Wellspring Learning Community =

Coordinates: 33.882668°N 35.519153°E

- (Lebanon) Beirut; Lebanon

Information
- Established: 2007
- Principal: Dr Rita Zgheib
- Grades: Nursery - High School
- Website: https://www.wellspring.edu.lb

Wellspring Learning Community is a comprehensive school for grades Nursery - High School (US Grade-numbering system) located in Beirut, Lebanon. It was founded in 2007 with grades nursery - three. The original campus in the Mathaf neighborhood now serves grades preschool through 5, while a second campus in Hazmieh/Ain el Remaneh opened in 2013 to accommodated the middle and high school students.

== Languages ==
Wellspring's curriculum is taught primarily in English. Social studies are taught in Arabic, and the students study the Arabic language. Elementary students study French as a third language, while grades 6-12 can choose between Spanish and French.

== International Baccalaureate Programme ==
Wellspring is notable in Lebanon for its participation in the IB Programme. The subject areas of the Primary Years Programme are language, social studies, mathematics, science and technology, arts, and personal, social and physical education. It is the only school in Lebanon to offer the IB program at the middle school (grades 6-8) level, through the MYP (Middle Years Programme). It also offers the IB programme for high school (DP Diploma Programme). The school year 2015-16 was the first year in which it offered grade 12.

Assessment is carried out by teachers according to strategies provided by the IB, and with respect to guidelines to what the students should learn specified in the curriculum model.

== Technology ==
Computer-assisted teaching and learning, and interactive whiteboards are utilized in keeping with Wellspring's emphasis on technology in the classroom. Students in Grades 6-12 are required to bring an iPad to school and utilize it for their studies.

== Community, Careers, Sustainability and the Environment ==
As its name suggests, Wellspring seeks to foster community, and community service, among all its constituents: students, teachers, staff, parents and area residents. Sustainability and respect for the environment are reflected in its Learning Garden, recycling program, and Living Workshop, and in its career education program.
