= Val Pere Jacques =

Private school in Lebanon

École des Sœeurs de la Croix - Val Père Jacques

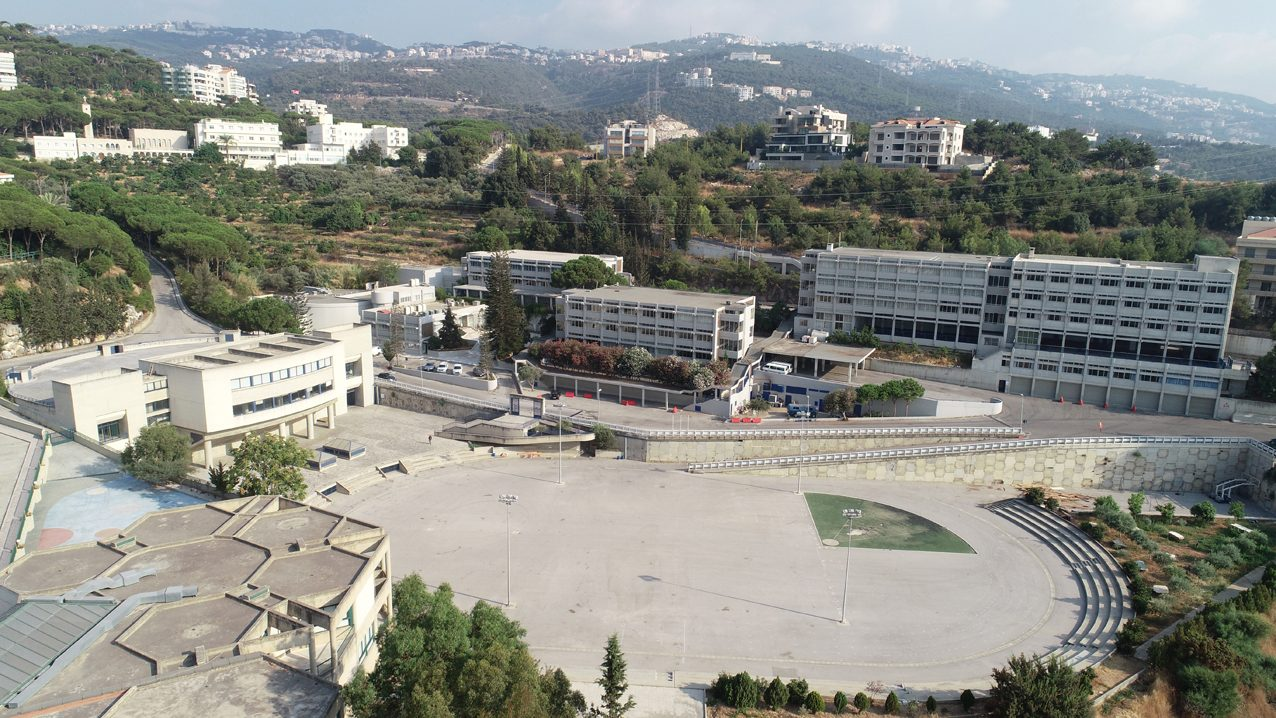
- Val Père Jacques school campus
- Jal el Dib - Bkenneya; Lebanon

Information
- Former name: Ecole Saint Francois des Sœeurs Franciscaines de la Croix
- School type: Private school
- Motto: Pour mieux vivre ensemble (To live together better)
- Religious affiliation: Christianity
- Denomination: Maronite
- Patron saint: Bx. Père Jacques
- Established: 1919
- Founder: Khalil Haddad
- Sister school: Ecole des Sœurs Franciscaines de la Croix - Hrajel
- Director: Sr. Thérèse Azar
- Faculty: Approx. 95
- Teaching staff: Approx. 190
- Key people: Approx. 10
- Grades: All grade levels are offered
- Primary years taught: 1st (EB1/12ème) through 5th (EB5/7ème) grades
- Secondary years taught: 6th (EB6/6ème) through 13th (terminale) grades
- Age range: 3 to 18 years old
- Enrollment: 2019 (2014-2019)
- Average class size: 23
- Student to teacher ratio: 11:1
- Education system: French, Lebanese
- Language: French, Arabic, English
- Hours in school day: 8-9 hours (max.)
- Classrooms: 90
- Colors: Navy, White
- Sports: Yes
- Accreditation: French baccalaureate; CELF; AEFE for cycle 1
- Yearbook: Panorama (Previously "Le Val")
- Annual tuition: Approx. US$5000
- Website: www.valperejacques.edu.lb

Val Père Jacques, also known as Val or VPJ, is a private French-language school in Bkenneya, Lebanon.

The school teaches all scholar levels, and follows both Lebanese and French baccalaureate programs, offering specializations in Mathematics (sciences générales - SG), Biology (sciences de la vie et de la terre - SV), and Economics and Social Sciences (sciences économiques et sociales - SE) for Lebanese baccalaureate students, and Economics and social sciences (Sciences économiques et sociales - SES), Mathematics (Mathématiques), Biology (Sciences de la vie et de la terre), and Physics/Chemistry (Physique-Chimie) for French baccalaureate students.

All subjects are taught in French, except for History, Geography, and Moral and Civic Education (for Lebanese baccalaureate students), with Arabic and English language classes.

The school is accredited by the Agency for French Education Abroad (Agence pour l'enseignement français à l'étranger - AEFE). Alongside receiving the CELF certification from the French Institute in Lebanon in 2025, a label recognising staff fluency in french.

The school also has extensive extracurricular activities such as diverse foreign language classes, a wide range of music classes and sports teams, scouts, an ecology club, an astronomy club, a social club, middle school and high school MUN programs, and their own "Franciscan youth" program.

== History ==
The school was founded in 1919 by Khalil al-Haddad (religious name Père Jacques), a Capuchin priest, as "École Saint François des Sœurs Franciscaines de la Croix". It was located at the time in Jal El Dib. In 1980 a new campus was built in Bkenneya. Since then, it has been known as "Val Père Jacques"

== Geographic location ==
- Region: Middle East
- Country: Lebanon
- City: Jal el Dib - Bkennaya / Biakout (In its far end)
- Caza: El Metn
- Mohafazat: Mount Lebanon
- Altitude: ≈125m

== Cycles ==
- Nursery Cycle (Cycle 1/Maternel)
- Primary School Cycle 1 (Cycle 2 / Élémentaire 1)
- Primary School Cycle 2 (Cycle 3 / Élémentaire 2)
- Complementary Cycle (Collège)
- Secondary Cycle (Lycée)
