= Ain W Zain =

Ain W Zain عين و زين
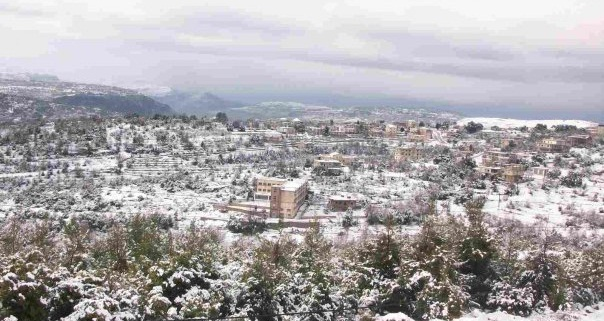

- Location in Lebanon
- Coordinates: 33°40′N 35°37′E
- Country: Lebanon
- Governorate: Mount Lebanon Governorate
- District: Chouf District

Government
  - Mayor: Mr. Marwan Al Hassanieh

Area
  - Total: 5 km^{2} (1.9 sq mi)
- Elevation: 1,050 m (3,440 ft)

Population
  - Total: 2,000
- Time zone: UTC+2 (EST)
  - Summer (DST): +3
- Postal code: 00961
- Area code: 5

Ain W Zain also known as Ain Wazein (Arabic: عين و زين, romanized: ʿAyn wa Zayn) is a Lebanese village in the Chouf District in the Mount Lebanon Governorate

== Geography ==
=== Population ===
The village has 2000 inhabitants and 925 voters between resident and expatriate. Literacy rate is high, and they major in various fields, especially medicine, engineering, law, education and modern technology. The majority of the population are self-employed and employees in the private and public sectors. A number of the villagers depend on agriculture.

== Landmarks ==
=== Ain W Zain Natural Grotto ===
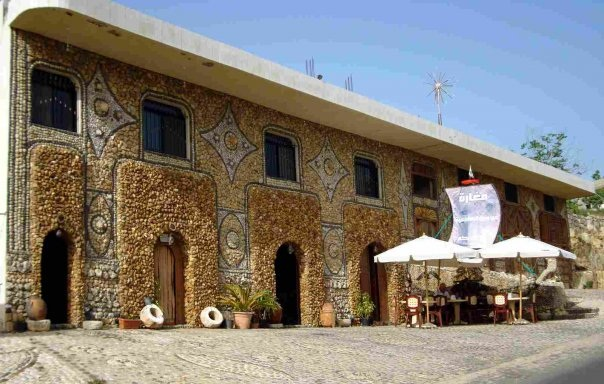
Ain W Zain Grotto.

The Grotto is located in Ain Wazein on an altitude of 1040 meters above sea level. It is 54 km from Beirut, and 9 km away from Beit-Eddine, center of the Shouf district. The Grotto that extends for 426 meters (till now) lies on Ain Wazein-Batloun road, near the northern end of Ain Wazein. The grotto was discovered in 2003. The preparation process lasted three years thanks to personal efforts.

The grotto includes a set of passageways, crevices or halls, and vaults of varied width and height. These natural formations resulted from accumulated water and its pressure. The grotto includes many distinct formations of stalagmites and stalactites, and other dangling rock formations. It is one of the grottos found in Lebanon, with its varied natural calcareous formations.

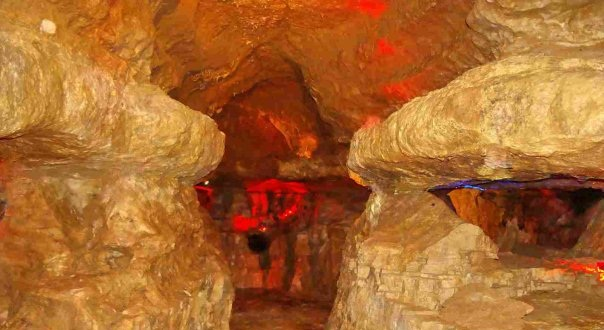
Ain W Zain Grotto.

Ain Wazein natural grotto is considered to be a continuous underground tourist site.

Ain Wazein grotto has calcareous formations found in its passages and sides. It is possible to organize scientific tours for high school and university students. This is possible because all geologic elements are clear in the grotto. It is possible also to carry out scientific research on its structural features.

Discovered in the year 2003, Ain Wazein Natural Grotto harbors rocks changed to narrow and branching passages, by waters flowing from the hollows of earth. Natural sculptures, suspended from its ceiling, flow in a musical procession along the notes of falling water droplets.

=== Ain W Zain Hospital ===
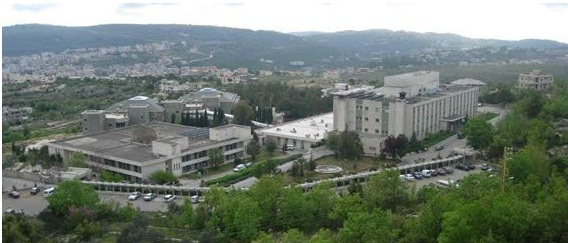
Ain W Zain Hospital.

The Health Establishment of the Druze Community is a private, non-profit organization, granted the qualification of public benefit with the notification No.133/AD, Decree No.4021. Located in the Chouf region, Mount Lebanon, at 40 km from Beirut and 45 km from Saida, the Establishment’s original role was to fulfill the needs of a region deprived and destroyed by war.

By the year 1978, spiritual leader of the Druze community, Shiek Akl Druze, Sheikh Mohammad Abu Chakra founded the “aged home” with the aim to provide superior quality health and residential care for the elderly. Later on, this “home” improved to become an elderly care center serving 75 residents.

The board of trustees and the Establishment’s management have planned for a new geriatric center that would be able to provide inpatient services to 300 residents in addition to outpatient services. The foundation stone was laid in September 2004, and the construction of the new geriatric care center is underway. The center opened its doors for its first customers in August 2009.

=== Nursing School ===
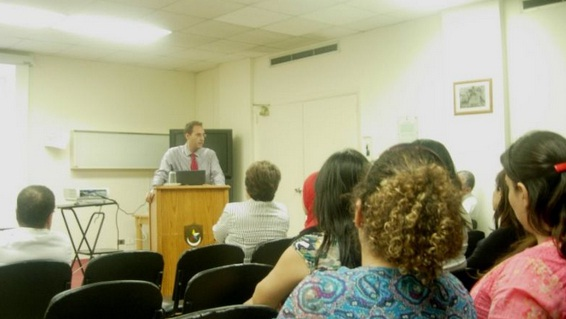
Ain W Zain Nursing school.

The Nursing Institute – Ain WaZein Hospital was established based on the agreement number -67- between Ministry of Education –The Directorate General of Vocational and Technical Education and the Board of Trustees of the "Health Establishment of the Druze Community" on 31 December 2001.

According to this agreement, the nursing institute continues to offer students public technical education in Nursing and Radiology. Students come from different areas: Shouf, Aley, Matn, Hasbaya, and Rachaya.

The institute has launched its work in 2001-2002 with nursing programs of two different degrees BT program (3 years post Brevet) and the BP program (1–2 years). The first class graduated in 2002 with 100% success in the official exams.

In 2004, degrees and specialties were upgraded to TS Program (3 years post secondary) in Nursing and Radiology. This provided an opportunity to gain higher degrees for those students willing to progress in professional education. 36 students graduated in the first TS graduation and this success has continued to the present date.

The total number of the graduates reached 222 till 2009, among them 50 registered nurses and 39 Radiology technicians. Theoretical and technical preparations of students are given according to official programs.

The graduates of the nursing institute are of the basic human staff in the medical organizations over the country regions especially Shouf area. And most of them attained Universities in order to gain higher educational degrees thus, being prepared to enroll in various responsibilities and meet requirement of.

== Gallery ==
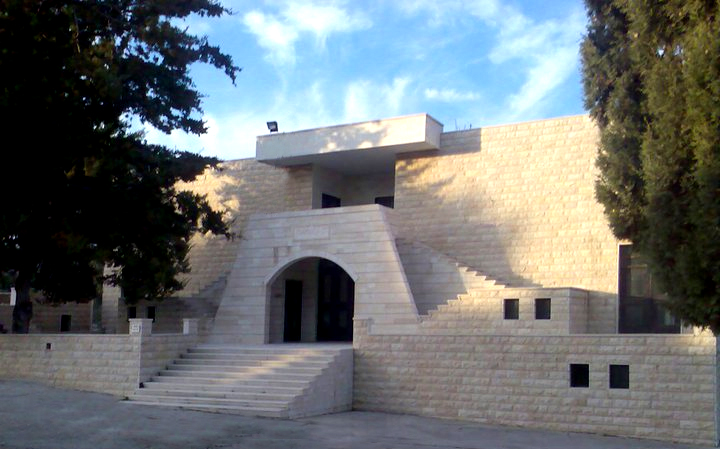
Village Hall in Ain W Zain

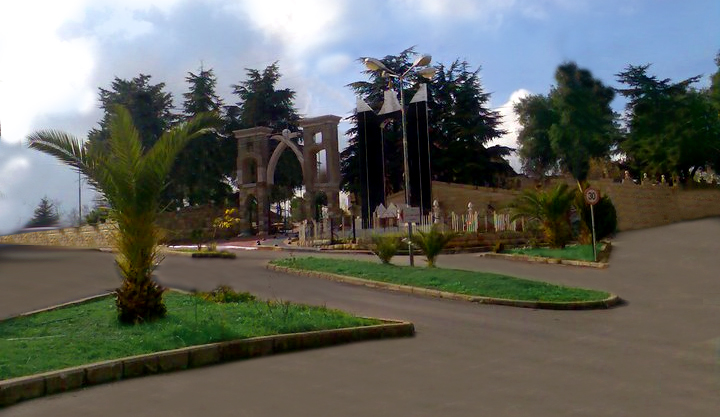
Ain W Zain main square

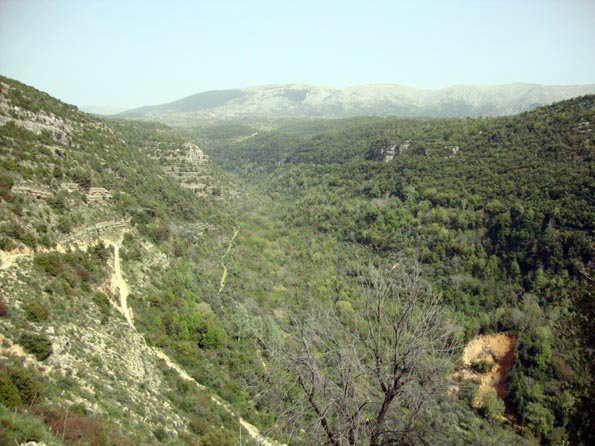
Ain W Zain Valley (Cliffs bordering the River)

Ain W Zain panoramic view as seen from the south-western hills
