= Elsa Zgheib =

Lebanese actress (born 1981)

- Born: February 1, 1981 (age 45); Amsheet, Lebanon
- Occupation: Actress
- Years active: 2003–present

Elsa Zgheib (Arabic: إلسا زغيب) is a Lebanese actress, born on February 1, 1981, in Amsheet, Lebanon.

== Early life ==
Elsa studied and graduated high school at Saint Coeur, Byblos, in 1998, and then studied theater in the Lebanese University and graduated in 2002. Her first appearance on TV was in the drama series "Min Ahla Byout Rass Bayrout" من أحلى بيوت راس بيروت (Season 2) on LBC, where she played the role of a lawyer.

== Career ==
=== 2003–2007: TV debut, teaching and commercials ===
Elsa began her career teaching theater in several schools until 2007. Her first appearance on the small screen began with commercials for Lebanon and the Arab World for various products and brands such as Arial, Kit Kat and Pizza Hut.

=== 2008–2016: TV series comeback, Studio El Fan ===
In 2008, Zgheib made a comeback to the small screen with small roles in several series starting with "Hawwa' fil Tarikh" ( حوّاء في التّاريخ) and the "Mafkoudin" (مفقودين) group series. She filmed several series such as "Mouabbad" (مؤبد )which aired in late 2009 on Future TV. Other projects included "Kadiyyat Youssef Chaaban" ( قضية يوسف شعبان) (LBC).

She played her first leading role in "Arlette and Edward" (أرليت و ادوار) (AL JADEED TV) in 2010. That year, she took part in the series "Min Ajli Aaynayha" ( من أجل عينيها) on OTV, in which she played the role of Salwa.

After the circulation of rumors that Zgheib would be presenting the newest season of TV's hit show "Studio El Fan" (استديو الفن), it was confirmed that she had gotten job. The show made its comeback on November 27, 2009, on MTV Lebanon until June 2010.

In November 2010, Zgheib was announced to play the lead role in a Lebanese TV drama named "Hiya wa Hiya" ( هي و هي ) opposite Lebanese actor Ammar Chalak which aired on Future TV and OTV. She was in the second part of "Al Ghaliboun" (2 الغالبون) which aired in Ramadan 2012. That year, she starred in "Jana Al Omer" (جنى العمر) opposite Youssef El Khal, which aired on "Future Television" and Al Jadeed in January 2013. In Ramadan of the same year, she starred in the series "Kiyamat Al Banadek" (قيامة البنادق). She played the role of an abused housewife in the 2014 series "Forsa Tenye" (فرصة تانية).

=== 2016–present: Pan-Arab TV series ===
In 2016, Zgheib returned to the small screen with two new series, "Fakhamet El Shak" (فخامة الشك). The following year, she starred in "Bi Lahza" (بلحظة). In 2019, she played the role of aunt Sabah in the pan-Arab series "Ma Fiyye" (ما فيي).

In 2021, she starred as Salma in the Jawwy TV series "Downtown" (داون تاون), whose misfortunes in life provide the basis of her character arch.

== Personal life ==
Zgheib is married to Riad Fahed with whom she has two children.

== Filmography ==
Television
| Year | Title | Role | Notes |
|---|---|---|---|
| 2001 | من أحلى بيوت راس بيروت | | |
| 2008 | حوّاء في التّاريخ | | |
| 2008 | مفقودين | | |
| 2009 | مؤبد | | |
| 2009 | قضية يوسف شعبان | | |
| 2010 | أرليت و ادوار | Arlette | Main role |
| 2010 | من أجل عينيها | Salwa | |
| 2010 | Studio El Fan | Host | 2009-2010 Season |
| 2011 | هي و هي | Dima - Main Role | Aired on Future TV and OTV |
| 2012 | الغالبون | Batoul | Season 2 |
| 2013 | جنى العمر | Salma - Main Role | Also aired on Al Jadeed in January 2013; Nominated for "Best Leading Actress" at the 2013 Murex D'Or. |
| 2013 | قيامة البنادق | Souaad | |
| 2014 | فرصة تانية | Ghida | |
| 2016 | فخامة الشك | Sara | |
| 2017 | بلحظة | Tala | |
| 2019 | ما فيي | Sabah | Season 1 and 2 |
| 2021 | داون تاون | Salma | Jawwy TV |

== Other projects ==
Zgheib established her own agency, The Divas, in 2008, which provides hosts, hostesses and coordinators for weddings and events.
