= Armenian Evangelical Peter and Elizabeth Torosian School =

Location
- Amanos, Mount Lebanon; Lebanon; 33.889117828299°N 35.54887989968707°E

Information
- Type: Private
- Established: 1951
- Principal: Seta Karageozian
- Grades: Kindergarten - Grade 9
- Religious Affiliation: Armenian Evangelical Church

The Armenian Evangelical Peter and Elizabeth Torosian School (Armenian: Հայ Աւետարանական Փիթր և Էլիզապէթ Թորոսեան Վարժարան) is a school in Bourj Hammoud, Lebanon.
