= Armenian Evangelical Secondary School of Anjar =

Location
- Anjar, Bekaa; Lebanon; 33.72825357329613°N 35.93291752646912°E

Information
- Type: Private
- Established: 1947
- Principal: Hagop Akbasharian
- Grades: Kindergarten - 12th
- Religious Affiliation: Armenian Evangelical Church

The Armenian Evangelical Secondary School of Anjar (Armenian: Հայ Աւետարանական Երկրորդական Վարժարան Այնճար) was founded by Swiss Missionaries in 1947. It has a dormitory for boys and girls.

== Notable alumni ==
- Hagop Panossian – aerospace engineer
