= National Evangelical School (Homs, Syria) =

The National Evangelical School
- الثانوية الإنجيلية الوطنية
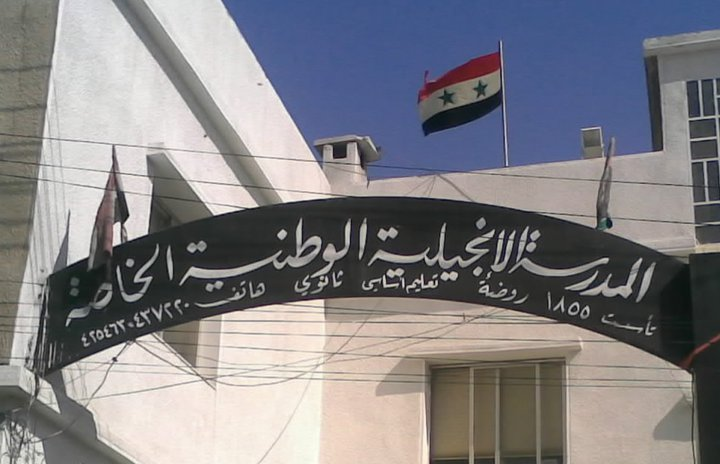

Location
- Bab El Sbaa; Homs; Syria

Information
- Type: Private
- Motto: Love of country and service to all without distinction
- Established: 1855; 171 years ago
- Founder: Rev. Hanna Khabbaz
- Principal: Marwan Deiratany
- Enrollment: 2,157
- Website: wihoms.atwebpages.com/NES.htm
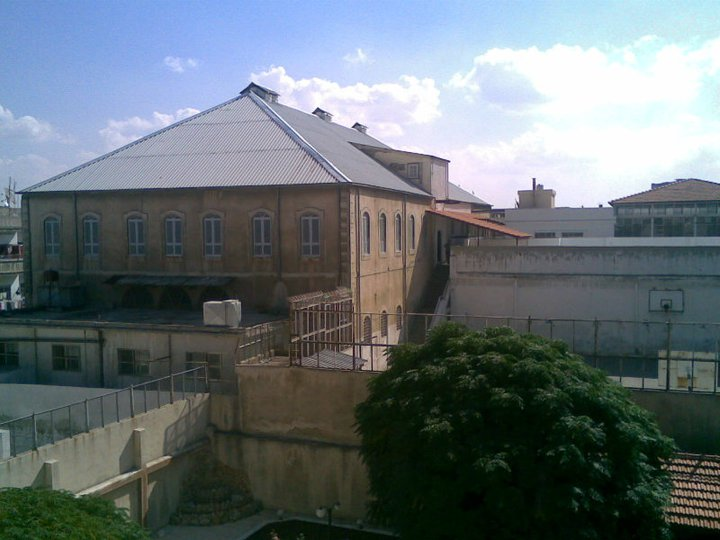
- The Main building of the school, 2010

The National Evangelical School is a private school located in Homs, Syria. It was founded in 1855 by American missionaries. It is owned now by the Presbyterian Evangelical Church in Homs which is a member of the National Evangelical Synod of Syria and Lebanon.

It is a kindergarten, primary, and secondary school that serves more than 2000 students, mixed and from all religions and sects.

== History ==
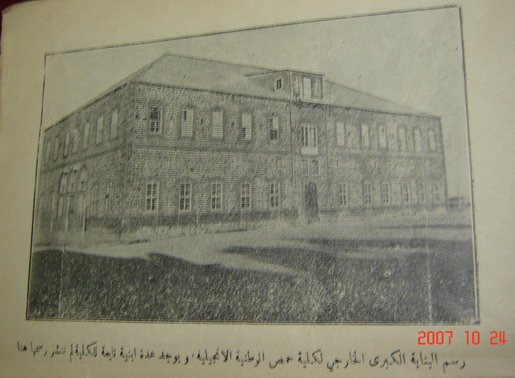
Drawing of the Main Building, 1907

- In 1855, it was founded by American missionaries as an elementary school with national management at the church property in Bestan El Diwan
- In 1905, It was developed nationally to a secondary school
- In 1907, the buildings in Bab El Sbaa were constructed by national effort without the help of the Missionary, and Rev. Hanna Khabbaz was its principal.
- In 1913, its graduates were accepted in the American University of Beirut for the first time without examination.
- During World War I, it was closed by the Ottoman Empire and became a military barracks.
- After the independence of Syria, the school's name was changed from National College to The National Evangelical School.
- In 1978, the school buildings for kindergarten were added.
- In 1996, another floor was added.
- In 2000, extension building was added to the primary section.

=== School names ===
The first name of the school was National College. it was also called Purity and Love. People in Homs once called it the English School, because it was the only school that conducted classes in English. It was also known as the Red Cross Hospital, after the British army occupied it and set the cross at the top of its main building. Afterwards, it became The National Evangelical School, as a sign of the Church's ownership.

== Campus ==
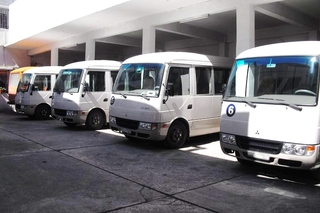
New school buses

The property of the school in Bab Al Sbaa is about 4,000 square meters. it includes 3 buildings each is two floors. Each section has its own courtyard or playground.

The school transports students using six busses it owns and more than 15 rented buses.

== Awards ==
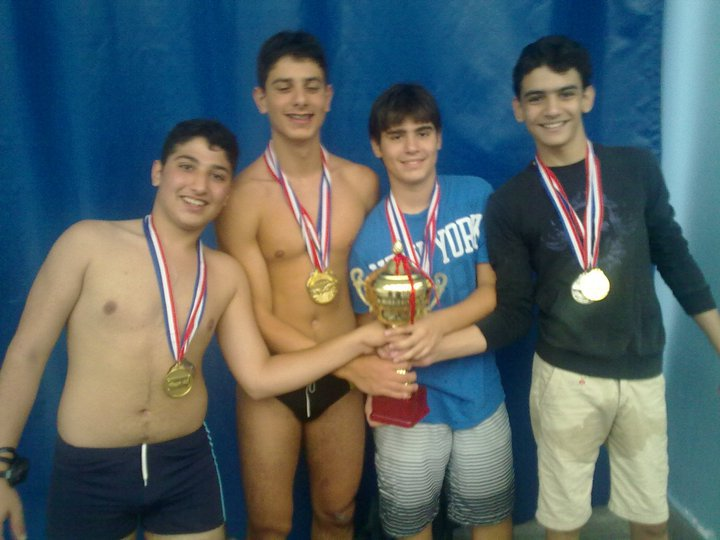
NES Swimming Team, Oct 2010

NES Swimming team:

- Third place in Homs Schools Swimming Tournament 2007-08
- First place in The International School of Choueifat Tournament under 14
- First Place in Homs Schools Swimming Tournament 2010:

First place in breast stroke 50m and 100m
First place in the Medley
