= Armenian Evangelical School of Trad =

- Bourj Hammoud, Mount Lebanon; Lebanon

Information
- Type: Private
- Established: 1936
- Closed: 2012
- Grades: Kindergarten - Elementary
- Religious Affiliation: Armenian Evangelical Church

The Armenian Evangelical School of Trad (Armenian: Հայ Աւետարանական Վարժարան Թրատ) was built in 1936, in a poor area in East Beirut named Trad District. It had kindergarten, and six primary classes..
