= Lycée Franco-Libanais Tripoli =

Lycée Alphonse de Lamartine Tripoli-Liban

Information
- Established: 1973
- Grades: Kindergarten - Grade 12
- Language: French

The Lycée Franco-Libanais de Tripoli, also known as Lycée Franco-Libanais Alphonse de Lamartine, is a 15-year private school (kindergarten through 12th grade) in North Lebanon, founded in 1973 by the Mission laïque française, as an annex to the Grand Lycée Franco-Libanais in Beirut. It was initially situated in Deddeh (Villa Bort) than relocated, due to 1975 war to Tripoli, then moved to Ras Maska and is now in its new establishment in Kfar Kahel.

== Education and curriculum ==
The primary language used in the school is French, but Arabic and English are also required.
As a member of the Mission laïque française (the French secular mission), the primary missions of the Lycée Franco-Libanais Tripoli are to spread secular values and the French language.
The school offers a double curriculum and invests in language instruction. Students are required to cover fully both the French curriculum and the Lebanese curriculum, with no "single curriculum" option except for children of expatriate French citizens who join late. For all students, but especially for Lebanese citizens, admission to the school is competitive based on examination, and priority is often given to children of alumni and siblings of current students.
Traditionally, more attention is given to the French curriculum in the final years of highschool (in preparation for the French baccalauréat, and more attention is given to the Lebanese curriculum in the final year of middle school (9th grade) in preparation for the Lebanese Brevet.
