= Nahr Ibrahim (town) =

- Town
- Location in Lebanon
- Coordinates: 34°3′58″N 35°38′42″E
- Country: Lebanon
- Governorate: Keserwan-Jbeil
- District: Byblos

Area
  - Total: 1.47 km^{2} (0.57 sq mi)
- Elevation: 220 m (720 ft)

Population (2017)
  - Total: 4,786
- Dialing Code: +961

Nahr Ibrahim is a town in the Byblos District of Keserwan-Jbeil Governorate, Lebanon. It is 47 kilometers north of Beirut. Nahr Ibrahim has an average elevation of 220 meters above sea level and a total land area of 341 hectares. The village has one public school, which enrolled 44 students in 2008 and a French university operating by the French and Lebanese governments' Conservatoire National des arts et métiers, which enrolled 2913 students as of May 2017. The village includes a large industrial area (papers, woods, cables, oil, oxygen,drugs, milk and cheese). Its inhabitants are predominantly Maronite Catholics.

== Culture and education ==
In 2010, a Public Library Section was established within the Cultural Centre in cooperation with the Province of Barcelona and United Cities and Local Governments. The municipality has been working on integrating approximately 1,300 Syrian refugees.

The municipality aims to expand its cultural center to become a comprehensive complex offering:

- Technical classes
- Educational programs
- Gymnasium facilities
- Dance studio
- Conference hall
- Social awareness sessions

This expansion is expected to create about 50 additional job opportunities.
