= Kisrawan =

Coastal region in Lebanon

The Kisrawan is a region between Mount Lebanon and the Mediterranean coast, north of the Lebanese capital Beirut and south of the Ibrahim River. It is administered by the eponymous Keserwan District, part of the Keserwan-Jbeil Governorate.

In the 12th–13th centuries it was a borderland between the Crusader states along the coast and the Muslim governments in Damascus. Its inhabitants at that time were Twelver Shia Muslims, Alawites, Druze and Maronite Christians. While the Kisrawanis acted independent of any outside authority, they often cooperated with the Crusader lords of Tripoli and Byblos. Soon after the Sunni Muslim Mamluks conquered the Crusader realms, they launched a series of punitive expeditions in 1292–1305 against the mountaineers of the Kisrawan. The assaults caused wide scale destruction and displacement, with Maronites from northern Mount Lebanon gradually migrating to the depopulated villages of the Kisrawan.

The Mamluks established Turkmen settlements in the coastland of the Kisrawan to keep guard over the region. The Turkmen chiefs from the Assaf dynasty continued to govern the Kisrawan with the onset of Ottoman rule in 1517. In alliance with the Maronite Hubaysh family, whose members served as their stewards and agents, the Assafs patronized Maronite settlement and prosperity in the region. The last Assaf emir was killed in 1591 by Yusuf Sayfa, the governor of Tripoli, who proceeded to take over the Kisrawan and kill the Hubayshs. After a number of struggles with the Druze Ma'ns over control of the Kisrawan, the Sayfas permanently lost their hold over the region to them in 1616. Under the patronage of the Ma'nid emir Fakhr al-Din II, the Maronite Khazen family gradually came to dominate the area, purchasing large tracts of land from Shia Muslim villagers. Their activities fostered the overwhelming Maronite majority of the region that persists until the present day.

The Khazens lost their grip over the region during a peasants' revolt led by Tanyus Shahin, who declared a republic over the Kisrawan in 1859. Although the Kisrawani militia played a key role sparking the 1860 Mount Lebanon civil war, the area largely avoided the bloodshed and destruction of that conflict. Shahin disbanded the republic while being pressured by the Maronite Church, as well as the Ottoman authorities. Shahin formally relinquished authority over the Kisrawan in 1861 after his defeat by Youssef Karam. During the Lebanese Civil War of 1975–1990, the Kisrawan was a stronghold of the Maronite-dominated Lebanese Forces militia.

== Etymology ==
The name Kesrawan has Persian origins. According to the historian Kamal Salibi, "the very name Kesrawan must have originally been that of a Persian clan called the Kisra". "Kisra" is the Arabic form of the common Persian name Khosrow and "Kisrawan" is the Persian plural form of Kisra.

== Geography ==
The Kisrawan is traditionally defined as the part of the Mount Lebanon region northeast of Beirut between the Ibrahim River in the north and the Kalb River in the south. It straddles the Mediterranean coast, extending eastward to the western slopes of the Mount Lebanon range.

== History ==
=== Early Muslim period ===
During the early Muslim period (630s–1099), the Kisrawan was part of Jund Dimashq (the military district of Damascus) and was administered from Baalbek. Mu'awiya I, the governor of the Levant in 639–661 and first Umayyad caliph (r. 661–680), settled Persian civilians and soldiers from other parts of the Levant in Baalbek and Tripoli. These Persian settlers had remained in the Levant after the Byzantines reconquered the region from the Persian Sasanian Empire and converted to Islam after the Muslim conquest in the 630s. Salibi holds that Mu'awiya also settled the Persians in the Kisrawan.

Information about the Christians of the Kisrawan before the 12th century is scant, though the local, 19th-century chronicler Tannus al-Shidyaq held there was an organized Christian, likely Maronite, community governed by village headmen by the early 9th century. The modern historian William Harris asserts that the origins of the Kisrawan Shia community in the 12th–13th centuries "are shrouded in mystery, with no clues in Arabic chronicles". Twelver Shia Muslim communities may have been established in the Kisrawan and the bordering Byblos area to the north during the 10th century when Shia Islam was in the ascendant in Tripoli and the Islamic world at large. According to the historian Jaafar al-Muhajir, the Twelvers of Kisrawan were likely remnants of the Shias of Tripoli who relocated to the Kisrawan during or after the Crusader siege of Tripoli in the early 12th century.

=== Crusader period ===
During Crusader rule in Tripoli and Beirut (c. 1099–1291), the Kisrawan was a rural borderland between the Crusader dominions along the Mediterranean coast and the Muslim states in the interior regions of the Levant. Its inhabitants were Twelver Shia, Alawite, Druze and Maronite tribesmen. The mountaineers of the Kisrawan acted independently of the Kingdom of Jerusalem, which controlled Sidon and Beirut, and the County of Tripoli, as well as the Muslim rulers of Damascus, all of whom claimed control of the Kisrawan. The Maronite chiefs there likely cooperated with the Crusaders and were strongly allied with the Embriaci lords of Byblos, who were vassals of the count of Tripoli. The Islamic communities in the Kisrawan did not share the Sunni Muslim faith of the Damascene rulers and may not have been enthusiastic supporters of their cause against the Crusaders, possibly even cooperating with the latter, although there's no historical evidence or mention of such a cooperation in the chronicles of the time.

=== Mamluk period ===
The Mamluks conquered Crusader Tripoli in 1289 and Beirut in 1291. According to the geographer al-Dimashqi (d. 1327), the region was part of the amal (subdistrict) of Baalbek, which was part of the al-Safaqa al-Shamaliyya (Northern Region) of Mamlakat Dimashq (Damascus Province). According to Salibi, it was part of the amal of Beirut, part of the same region and province.

==== Punitive campaigns ====
In the aftermath of the Crusader withdrawal from the Levant, the mountaineers of the Kisrawan frequently blocked the coastal road between Tripoli and Beirut and harassed passing Mamluk troops. The Mamluks launched a punitive campaign against them in 1292. It was led by Baydara, the viceroy of Egypt, the second highest-ranking official in the sultanate, after the commanders of Damascus expressed reticence fighting the experienced mountaineers in the region's narrow passes. Baydara was defeated and was able to withdraw his men only after bribing the Kisrawani chiefs.

When the Mamluks were routed by the Mongols of the Ilkhanate at the Battle of Wadi al-Khaznadar near Homs in 1299, the mountaineers attacked and robbed Mamluk troops in their panicked flight through the Kisrawani coastal roads and the road between Beirut and Damascus. The Mamluks reasserted their position in the Levant in 1300 and took punitive action against the Kisrawan. Under the Damascus governor Aqqush al-Afram, the Mamluks routed the Kisrawani warriors and imposed heavy penalties on the inhabitants and their leaders. Kisrawani rebel activity resumed within a few years and Aqqush led a final, large-scale campaign against the mountaineers in 1305. Hundreds of fighters were slain and the Mamluks destroyed numerous villages, churches and vineyards, while massacring and displacing many of the inhabitants.

The Alawites of the Kisrawan were particularly hard hit in the 1305 campaign and thereafter disappeared from the historical record. Many Shia Muslim families were relocated to Tripoli and were permanently displaced from the coastal area. They remained the majority population in the Kisrawan, but their numbers never recovered. The Maronites also suffered significantly, but the displacement of Shia and Alawite communities eventually paved the way for Maronites from northern Mount Lebanon to settle in their place.

==== Establishment of the Turkmens ====
The Mamluks settled Sunni Muslim Turkmens in the coastal villages of the Kisrawan in 1306 to serve as a permanent direct guard for the government over the region and the road to Beirut. Their territory extended along the coastal region of the Kisrawan between Antelias in the south and Nahr al-Mu'amalatayn, just north of the Bay of Jounieh. The Turkmens were granted this territory as an iqta. Although iqta-holders in principle were only granted the right to an area's revenues as a salary and to provide for their troops, the Turkmens, like their Druze Buhturid neighbors to the south, held them on a practically inheritable basis.

The Turkmens temporarily evacuated the Kisrawan for Ottoman-controlled Anatolia in 1366 to escape punishment by the Mamluks for failing to heed unspecified government orders. When the Circassian sultan Barquq was overthrown by the Turkish Mamluks who had previously ruled the sultanate in 1289, the Turkmens supported the Turks, while their Buhturid rivals backed Barquq. The Turkmens assaulted the Buhturid domains, killing 130 Buhturids and sacking their lands and houses in the Gharb area southeast of Beirut. Barquq retook the sultanate in 1390 and dispatched Arab tribesmen from the Beqaa Valley to attack the Turkmens, killing their leader Ali ibn al-A'ma. The Mamluks captured and soon after freed Ali's brother Umar, probably to not afford the Buhturids too much advantage from the Turkmens' losses.

=== Ottoman period ===
==== Assaf rule ====
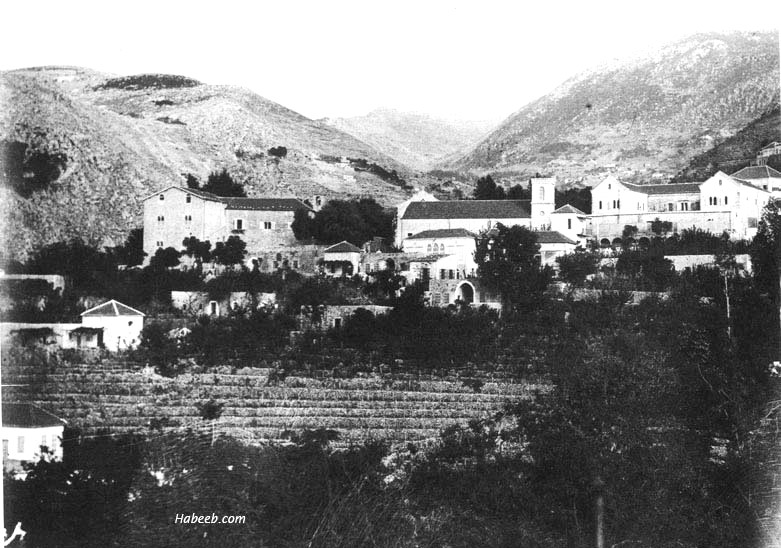
After the Ottoman conquest of the Levant in 1516, the Assaf lords of Kisrawan moved their headquarters to Ghazir (pictured in 1893), where they cultivated close ties with the Maronites of the district, particularly the Hubaysh family, at the expense of their Turkmen kinsmen.

The Ottomans conquered the Mamluk Sultanate in 1516–1517 and the Ottoman sultan Selim conferred on the Turkmen emir Assaf the inheritable lordship of the Kisrawan, as well as the neighboring Bilad Jubayl (the mountains of Byblos) to the north of Nahr al-Mu'amalatayn, in return for annual payment. Administratively, the Kisrawan became a nahiya (subdistrict) of the Sidon-Beirut Sanjak (Sidon-Beirut District) of the Damascus Eyalet (Damascus Province). Through the following several years the Kisrawan experienced peace and prosperity while conditions in the Druze Mountain to its south (i.e. the districts of the Matn, Gharb, Jurd and Chouf) were characterized by chaos and punitive expeditions by the Ottoman government. The Assafs ruled over the area with mildness and the government collected taxes at a relatively low rate. These conditions spurred increased resettlement of the region. Ottoman tax records indicate there were 28 villages in the subdistrict in 1523, rising to 31 in 1543.

The tax records did not distinguish different Muslim groups from each other, nor different Christian denominations. In the 1523 records, the Kisrawan had a population of 391 Muslim households, 37 Muslim bachelors, 7 imams, and 198 Christian households and 21 Christian bachelors. The Christian population had grown substantially by 1530, with 297 households and 5 bachelors, while the Muslim population grew to 404 households and 103 bachelors, the number of imams decreasing to 3. By 1543, the Muslim population decreased to 377 households, 65 bachelors and no imams, while Christian households and bachelors rose to 372 and 34. According to the 17th-century Maronite historian Istifan al-Duwayhi, Shia Muslims from Baalbek moved to Faraya, Bekataa and Harajil, Sunni Muslims from the southern Beqaa Valley settled in Fatqa, Sahel Alma, Faitroun, Fiqqay, Aramoun and Jdeideh, while Druze from the Matn settled in Brummana and smaller hamlets. Christians from northern Mount Lebanon continued to migrate to the Kisrawan, with Maronites from al-Majdal moving to Aramoun and the Hubaysh family of Yanouh settling in Ghazir.

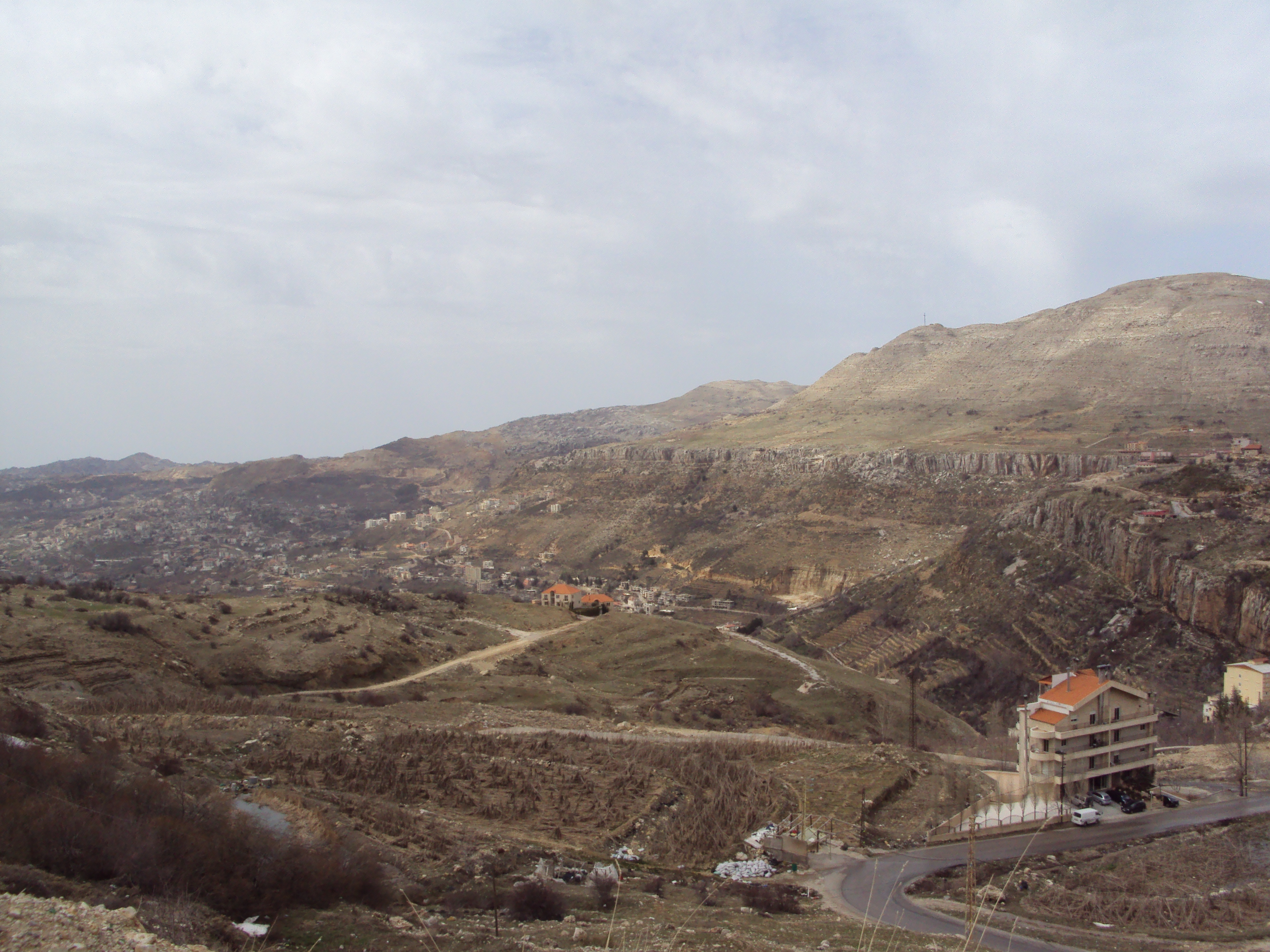
The village of Faraya in the Kisrawan was settled by Shia Muslims from Baalbek in the early 16th century

Assaf moved his headquarters to Ghazir; previously he divided his time between estates at Aintoura and Ain Shaqif. His move away from his Turkmen tribesmen's abodes closer to the coast, namely Zouk Mikael, Zouk Kharab, Zouk Mosbeh and Zouk Amiriyya, contributed to the estrangement between them and Assaf and his household. In Ghazir the Assafs cultivated ties with the Maronites, particularly the Hubaysh family, with Assaf and his sons Hasan and Husayn recruiting the Hubaysh brothers as their stewards and agents. The Hubayshes also acted as intermediaries between the Assafs and their Maronite subjects in the mostly Maronite Bilad al-Jubayl (the Byblos region). After Assaf died in 1518 his youngest son Qaytbay killed Hasan and Husayn, drove out the Hubayshes, and took over the Kisrawan from his base in Beirut. Five years later Qaytbay died and Hasan's son Mansur, with the support of the Hubaysh family, took charge of the Kisrawan.

In the late 1530s, Sunni Muslim opposition against Mansur and the Hubayshes was raised in the Kisrawan by the Turkmen chief of Zouk Mikael, who was resentful at the neglect by the Assafs in favor of the Maronites, and the Arab chief of Fatqa from the Beqaa-based Hanash family. In 1541 Mansur had them both assassinated, effectively voiding the brewing opposition against Assaf–Hubaysh domination. The blow to the Hanash and Turkmens in the Kisrawan opened the door to further Maronite migration from the north. In 1545 Maronites from Jaj moved to the district, the ancestor of the Khazen family moved to Ballouneh, the Gemayel family moved to Bikfaya and the Kumayd family moved to the Ghazir area.

Assaf dominance over northern Lebanon, including the Kisrawan persisted through Mansur's death in 1580 and the first five years under his son and successor Muhammad. In 1585 the Ottomans launched a punitive expedition against the rural chieftains of Mount Lebanon. Muhammad was arrested and imprisoned in the imperial capital Constantinople but returned the next year. At that point his authority was expanded to include the tax farms for all the districts of northern Mount Lebanon, excluding the city of Tripoli. The governor of Tripoli and a former dependent of the Assafs, Yusuf Sayfa, was also the chieftain of Akkar and thus a fiscal subordinate of Muhammad. He resolved to eliminate the Assaf emir and take over his territory. He refused to pay his tax arrears and when Muhammad moved against him in 1591, Sayfa had him assassinated. Afterward Sayfa married his widow and took over Assaf properties in Ghazir and gained the tax farm of the Kisrawan. Hubaysh influence took a decisive blow, with Sulayman Hubaysh and his nephews Mansur and Muhanna arrested and executed by Sayfa. The Shia Hamade clan gained influence in their place under Sayfa rule.

==== Sayfa–Ma'n conflict ====
The takeover of the Kisrawan by Sayfa caused consternation with the provincial government in Damascus. It viewed the district's control by the governor of Tripoli (Sayfa) as effectively separating it from Damascene administration. Further, by controlling the Kisrawan, Sayfa antagonized the Druze chief and district governor of Sidon-Beirut Sanjak, Fakhr al-Din Ma'n, whose jurisdiction bordered the Kisrawan. In 1598 Fakhr al-Din and the governor of Baalbek, Musa al-Harfush, with Damascene backing, routed the Sayfas in a battle at the Kalb River. Fakhr al-Din captured the Kisrawan but returned it to Sayfa a year later as part of an agreement with him.

During the rebellion of Ali Janbulad of Aleppo, Fakhr al-Din allied with the rebels and took over the Kisrawan in 1606, following the flight of Sayfa from Tripoli. He installed Yusuf al-Muslimani as his deputy over the subdistrict. When Fakhr al-Din fled Mount Lebanon for Tuscany during an Ottoman punitive expedition in 1613, the Kisrawan was restored to the Sayfas by the commander of the expedition, Hafiz Ahmed Pasha. The following year a new province was established, the Sidon Eyalet, and its governor Bustanji Pasha attempted to wrest control of the Kisrawan but was repulsed by the Sayfas. The Sayfas permanently lost the district in 1616, when Fakhr al-Din's son Ali and brother Yunus, with Ottoman backing, defeated the Sayfas' Druze allies and caused Hasan Sayfa (Yusuf's son) to flee for Akkar. In 1621, Fakhr al-Din, who had since returned to Mount Lebanon, compelled Sayfa to relinquish to him his remaining properties in Ghazir and Antelias to settle Sayfa's mounting debt.

==== Khazen control ====
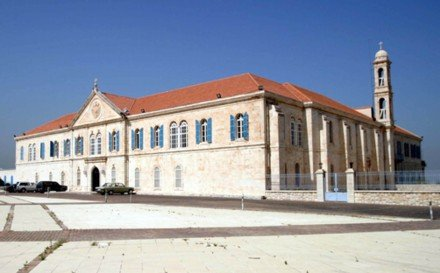
The Maronite Patriarchate in Bkerke, Kisrawan

The Khazens of Ballouneh had relocated to the Kisrawan village of Ajaltoun in 1606. The prominence they soon acquired in the region stemmed from their close alliance with Fakhr al-Din. The head of the Khazens, Abu Nadir (d. 1647), was Fakhr al-Din's aide and held the tax farm of Kisrawan in 1616–1618 and 1621. The Khazens lost control of the district to the Alam al-Dins after Fakhr al-Din's downfall in 1633, but regained it four years later when Fakhr al-Din's nephew Mulhim Ma'n defeated the Alam al-Dins.

Abu Nadir consolidated Khazen control of the Kisrawan by purchasing large tracts of land there from the impoverished Twelver Shias of the district. His son Abu Nawfal continued his father's land acquisitions and, with his sons, was granted an extensive estate in the district by Sultan Mehmed IV in 1671. Moreover, Abu Nawfal gained the influential office of French vice-consul in Beirut in 1658 and again in 1662. His descendants held the office for considerable periods through the late 17th and early 18th centuries. During this period, Abu Nawfal divided his estate in the Kisrawan among his eight sons. The sons and their descendants mainly based themselves in the villages of Ghosta, Ajaltoun and Zouk Mikael, and to a lesser extent Daraoun and Sahel Alma.

Khazen domination of the Kisrawan facilitated its demographic transition into an overwhelmingly Maronite-populated region. Besides the tax collection rights the family obtained on a practically inheritable basis, the Khazens monopolized the silk trade in Kisrawan, fostering sericulture there and the migration of Maronite peasants from northern Mount Lebanon.

==== Peasants' revolt and the 1860 civil war ====
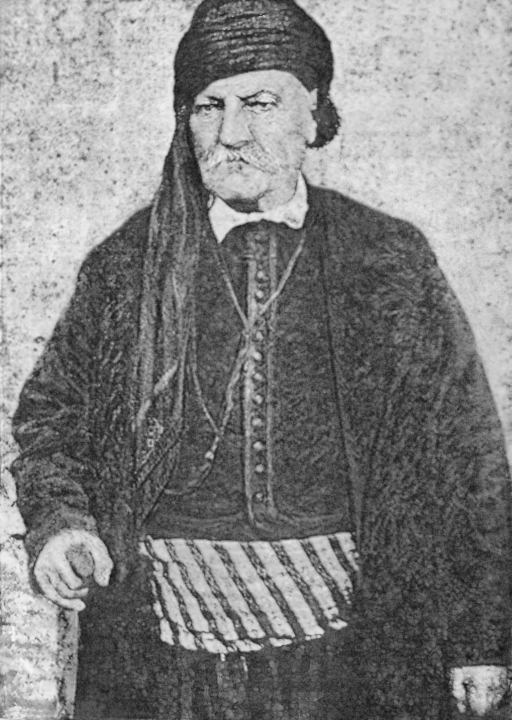
Tanyus Shahin of the village of Rayfoun led the peasants of Kisrawan in revolt against their Khazen lords in 1859

Frustration had been mounting among the peasants of the Kisrawan from the mid-19th century, due to the burdens of corvée (unpaid labor for a landlord) that had been imposed during the rule of Emir Bashir Shihab II, general economic hardship, and the decreasing availability of land. Khazen power had been significantly diminished under Bashir. To meet the latter's increased tax demands and finance their attempt to consolidate their control over Kisrawan's silk production, the Khazens took loans from Beirut lenders and accumulated significant debts. Several family members became destitute in the 1830s and 1840s and Khazen influence over the Maronite Church waned. To compensate for their economic, social and political stagnation, the Khazens increased their pressure on the peasants of Kisrawan in the late 1850s, while also spending extravagantly. The Khazens opposed the creation of the "Double Qaimaqmate" in Mount Lebanon in the 1840s, which divided Mount Lebanon into Druze and Christian-run sectors, and were incensed at the appointment of a sheikh from the mixed Druze-Christian Abu'l-Lama family as the qaimaqam (deputy governor) of the Maronite section of the Qaimaqamate. The Khazens feared that such an appointment would formally subordinate them to the Abu'l-Lama sheikhs. Following the Abu'l-Lama sheikh's death in 1854, his successor Bashir Ahmad Abu'l-Lama attempted to further reduce the Khazens' influence, prompting the Khazens to stir the peasants to revolt against him. The revolt against Bashir Ahmad soon turned against the Khazen sheikhs and their feudal allies. The peasant subjects of the Khazen sheikhs had long been wary of their rule due to the excessive taxes they imposed as well as the additional gifts the peasants were virtually obligated to give the sheikhs, which many peasants considered humiliating.

In early 1858, a group of peasants from the Kisrawan lodged a formal complaint against the Khazens to Khurshid Pasha, the Ottoman governor of Beirut. Later, in March 1858, the Khazens held a summit for the people of the Kisrawan to garner support for their nomination of a new qaimaqam. Instead, the peasants participating in the summit voiced their dissent against the Khazens and in October, several villages in the Kisrawan allied against the Khazen sheikhs. A muleteer and youths boss from Rayfoun, Tanyus Shahin, was chosen by this alliance of peasants as their leader in December, and was declared the wakil awwal (first delegate). This popular revolt completely broke with the traditional way of organizing politics in the region of Mount Lebanon. Before, politics were dominated by powerful families and elites such as the Khazens. In an attempt to break with the elite rule, the revolutionaries demanded to elect their own representatives (wakils). Thereby they insisted that they were equal to their shaykhs in social status. However, the Khazens refused to recognize the newly established political agency of the common people. In their view, these ordinary people could not have organized this radical movement independently. The Khazens described the rebellion as acting out of juhl (ignorance) and could only believe that it was planned by hidden conspirators.

In January 1859, Shahin intensified the armed revolt against the Khazen sheikhs and with 800 of his peasant fighters, he besieged the Khazens during a summit they were holding in Ghosta. The siege prompted the sheikhs to flee the village, and the peasants under Shahin subsequently plundered the Khazens' estates. Shahin and his men proceeded to attack the Khazens in other villages with little blood spilled in the process, with the exception of the wife and daughter of a Khazen sheikh who were killed in Ajaltoun in July during a raid on their home by the peasants. The Maronite patriarch, Paul Peter Massad, condemned their killing as a "horrific crime". Silk and wheat warehouses belonging to the sheikhs were plundered and the goods were redistributed among the peasants of the Kisrawan. By July, the Khazens had been routed and between 500 and 600 family members had fled to Beirut in an impoverished state. Shahin broadened the peasants' main demands of tax relief and refunds for the illegal payments they had previously paid to the Khazen sheikhs to also include political and legal reforms. Shahin cited the Edict of Gülhane, which mandated equality for all Ottoman citizens. According to Makdisi, Shahin understood the edict's promise of equality to mean equality between rich and poor as well as between religious communities. Ottoman authorities rejected this interpretation. They intended the equality mentioned in the Edict of Gülhane as religious equality. The reformers did not foresee an interpretation that justified social equality between notables and common people. Shahin's demand for social equality based on this edict brought the Ottoman state in a crisis.

Shahin declared a republic in the Kisrawan and a government composed of a 100-member council of representatives of the Kisrawan's villages, mostly peasants but also landowners and clergymen, presided by Shahin was established to govern the region backed by his 1,000-man militia. The republic was mainly supported by the villages of Rayfoun, Ajaltoun, Ashqout, Qleiat and Mazraat Kfardebian, and the headquarters was originally in Zouk Mikael before being relocated to Rayfoun. Opposition to the government was strongest in the villages of Ghosta, Aramoun, Ghazir and Ftuh. Shahin's star rose among the Christians of Mount Lebanon in general, who saw in him their defender against the Druze landlords and the traditional Maronite elites. In response to complaints of harassment of Shia Muslim villagers by local Christians in the region, Shahin assaulted and looted Shia villages in the Kisrawan and Byblos hills in late 1859.

In May 1860, Shahin's militiamen intervened on the side of Christian villagers in the neighboring Matn region to the south during clashes with their Druze counterparts. The clashes and counterattacks that followed developed into a full-scale civil war. This was fought mainly between the Druze and the Christians of Mount Lebanon. Despite a proclamation that he could raise a 50,000-strong army for the Christian side, Shahin's militia mainly guarded their home region of the Kisrawan, while the Druze advanced against their Christian opponents elsewhere in Mount Lebanon. Under pressure by the Maronite Church and the Ottomans, Shahin practically disbanded his peasants' republic. The following year, after an international intervention ended the civil war, a rival Maronite leader, Youssef Karam, defeated Shahin at a battle between Rayfoun and Ashqout. They reconciled soon afterward and Shahin formally relinquished the republic.

==== Modern times ====
During the 1975-1990 civil war Kesrawan became a stronghold of Samir Geagea’s Lebanese Forces (LF). In 1990 the LF retained control of the area, as well as East Beirut, despite a month long offensive by Lebanese Army troops loyal to General Michel Aoun which caused extensive damage and many casualties.

== Demographic history ==
At the start of Ottoman rule, Kesrawan was sparsely populated. Maronites from the north increasingly moved into the region through the 16th century, such that they nearly equaled the number of Twelver Shia there by the 1569 census. It showed Muslims, presumably Twelver Shias, and Christians, presumably Maronites, comprising 43% and 38% of Kesrawan's 892 households. By around the mid-17th century, under the patronage of the Khazen chiefs, Maronite migration made the community the majority group in Kesrawan. Likely during the 18th century, a proportion of the remaining Twelver Shias there converted to Maronite Christianity. Unlike in the parts of Mount Lebanon south of Kesrawan where Druze landlords held sway, many of the Maronite peasants in Kesrawan owned their agricultural property. Western travelers estimated the Maronite population of Kesrawan combined with rural northern Mount Lebanon to be 50,000 in 1690 and 115,000 in 1783.

== Bibliography ==
- Abu-Husayn, Abdul-Rahim (1985). Provincial Leaderships in Syria, 1575–1650. Beirut: American University of Beirut. ISBN 9780815660729.
- Aytekin, E. Attila (2012). "Peasant Protest in the Late Ottoman Empire: Moral Economy, Revolt, and the Tanzimat Reforms". International Review of Social History. 57 (2): 191–227. doi:10.1017/S0020859012000193. hdl:11511/48429.
- Bakhit, Muhammad Adnan Salamah (February 1972). The Ottoman Province of Damascus in the Sixteenth Century (PhD). School of Oriental and African Studies, University of London.
- Fawaz, L. T. (1994). An Occasion for War: Civil Conflict in Lebanon and Damascus in 1860. University of California Press. ISBN 9780520087828.
- Harris, William (2012). Lebanon: A History, 600–2011. Oxford University Press. ISBN 9780195181111.
- Hokayem, Antoine (1988). Les provinces arabes de l'Empire Ottoman aux Archives du Ministère des affaires étrangères de France, 1793-1918 (in French). Editions universitaires du Liban.
- Johnson, Michael (2001). All Honourable Men: The Social Origins of War in Lebanon. I.B.Tauris. ISBN 9781860647154.
- van Leeuwen, Richard (1994). Notables and Clergy in Mount Lebanon: The Khāzin Sheikhs and the Maronite Church, 1736–1840. Leiden, New York and Koln: Brill. ISBN 90-04-09978-6.
- Makdisi, Ussama Samir (2000). The Culture of Sectarianism: Community, History, and Violence in Nineteenth-Century Ottoman Lebanon. University of California Press. ISBN 9780520922792.
- Al-Muhajir, Ja'far (1992). The Foundation for the History of the Shiites in Lebanon and Syria: The First Scientific Study on the History of the Shiites in the Region (in Arabic). Beirut: Dar Al-Malak.
- Salibi, Kamal S. (September 1957). "The Maronites of Lebanon under Frankish and Mamluk Rule (1099–1516)". Arabica. 4 (3): 288–303. doi:10.1163/157005857X00057. JSTOR 4055054.
- Salibi, Kamal S. (January 1961). "The Buḥturids of the Garb. Mediaeval Lords of Beirut and of Southern Lebanon". Arabica. 8 (1): 74–97. doi:10.1163/157005861X00043. JSTOR 4054971.
- Salibi, Kamal (June 1967). "Northern Lebanon under the Dominance of Ġazīr (1517–1591)". Arabica. 14 (2): 144–166. doi:10.1163/157005867X00029. JSTOR 4055631.
- Salibi, Kamal S. (2005). A House of Many Mansions: The History of Lebanon Reconsidered. I.B. Tauris. ISBN 978-1-86064-912-7.
- Thompson, Elizabeth F. (2013). Justice Interrupted: The Struggle for Constitutional Government in the Middle East. Harvard University Press. ISBN 9780674076099.
- Trablousi, Fawwaz (2007). A History of Modern Lebanon. Pluto Press. ISBN 9780745324371.
- Winter, Stefan (2010). The Shiites of Lebanon under Ottoman Rule, 1516–1788. Cambridge University Press. ISBN 9781139486811.
