= Jouret =

Jouret may refer to

- Jouret (surname)
- Jouret Bedran, a village and municipality in Lebanon
- Jouret el ballout, a village in Lebanon
- Jouret el-Termos, a village and municipality in Lebanon
- Chahtoul-Jouret Mhad, a municipality in Lebanon
