= Kisra of Baskinta =

Maronite Muqaddam of Mount Lebanon

Amir Kisra of Baskinta was a Maronite Muqaddam and Malik of Kisrawan, whose namesake comes from him, and later Malik of Mount Lebanon.

== Life ==
Kisra was born sometime in the 11th century to a Maronite family in Baskinta, Lebanon. He was probably of noble descent due to his eventual ascension as muqaddam of his village.

Kisra, along with his maternal nephew Sim'an, were muqaddams of the village of Baskinta and held an autonomous jurisdiction over the Outer Kisrawan region, then known simply as "al-Hariga" (roughly translating to outer or borderlands), free from direct Crusader or Islamic control. However, Kisra still had contact with the Crusaders and often fought alongside them against Islamic forces. In one instance, he tried to hire a fellow muqaddam, Kamil of Lehfed, into his service but the latter refused pledging his fealty to the Lord of Gibelet, Hugo I Embriaco. Still seeking an alliance, Kisra tried to arrange a marriage between his son and Kamil's daughter with the marriage only taking place after Kamil got the approval of his Lord. This showed the complex political situation of the Maronites at the time with some exercising independence from any outside foreign rule while others willingly became the loyal subjects of the European newcomers.

Sim'an was summoned to Gibelet, along with the Maronite Patriarch Gregory IV of Halat and all of the Maronite bishops, and was officially appointed Malik of Kisrawan by William II Embriaco as a reward for his fighting against the Muslims for thirty years and finally defeating them at Nahr al-Kalb. Kisra later succeeded his nephew as Malik of Kisrawan and went on pilgrimage to Constantinople to pay homage to the Byzantine Emperor, John II Komnenos.

According to Gabriel ibn al-Qilai, after being received in the Byzantine court:

The Emperor, placing a sword over Kisra's head, dubbed him malik of Mount Lebanon. He also added, rather vaguely, that the sword of Kisra was "a cross on the battlefield" (possibly meaning that it had the Crusader cruciform hilt) and that his armour bore the sign of the cross, signifying that he fought among the ranks of the Crusaders.

== Legacy ==
The region of al-Hariga was renamed Kisrawan in honor of Kisra and the name survives to this day as the Keserwan District.

== See also ==
- Baskinta
- County of Tripoli
- Mardaites
- Maronites
