= Keserwan =

Keserwan may refer to the following:

- Kisrawan (or Keserwan), a historical region in Mount Lebanon
- Keserwan District, the administrative district in the Keserwan-Jbeil Governorate of modern Lebanon
- Keserwan-Jbeil Governorate, a governorate in modern Lebanon
