= Daraya =

Daraya may refer to the following places:

- Daraya, Keserwan, a village in Keserwan District, Lebanon
- Daraya, Zgharta, a village in Zgharta District, Lebanon
- Darayya, a town in Rif Dimashq Governorate, Syria
