= Ghazir Volleyball =

Ghazir
- Full name: Club Ghazir
- Founded: 17 / 09 / 1965
- Ground: Club Ghazir (Capacity: 4,500)
- League: Lebanese Volleyball League

Uniforms
Home	Away

Club Ghazir is a professional volleyball team based in Ghazir, Lebanon. It plays in the Lebanese Volleyball League. It has won two times the Lebanese Volleyball League (2003, 2004), and the Lebanese Volleyball Cup twice (1993, 2003). The current president is Jean Hammam.

== Achievements ==
- Lebanese Volleyball League (2)
  - Winner: 2003, 2004
  - 2nd place: 1996, 1997, 1998, 1999, 2000, 2001
- Lebanese Volleyball Cup (2)
  - Winner: 1993, 2003
- Arab Championship
  - Fourth Place: 18th Arab Championship (Morocco, 1999), 21st Arab Championship (Lebanon 2002)
- Asian Championship
  - Fifth Place: 9th Asian Championship (Lebanon, 1997), 10th Asian Championship (Lebanon, 1998), 11th Asian Championship (Thailand, 1999)
