= Adma wa Dafneh =

Adma wa Dafneh أدما والدفنة
- Town
- Location in Lebanon
- Coordinates: 34°1′21″N 35°38′50″E
- Country: Lebanon
- Governorate: Keserwan-Jbeil
- District: Keserwan
- Established: 19th century

Government
  - Mayor: Charbel Hanna Chahwan

Area
  - Total: 2.733 km^{2} (1.055 sq mi)
- Elevation: 215 m (705 ft)
- Highest elevation: 330 m (1,080 ft)
- Lowest elevation: 100 m (330 ft)

Population (2015)
  - Total: 2,497
  - Density: 913.5/km^{2} (2,366/sq mi)
- Time zone: UTC+2 (EET)
  - Summer (DST): UTC+3 (EEST)
- Dialing code: +961
- Website: Adma wa Dafneh

Adma wa Dafneh (Arabic: أدْما والدّفنة, romanized: ʾAdmā wa ad-Dafneh), also known as Adma (Arabic: أدما, romanized: ʾAdmā), is an upper-class town in the Keserwan District of the Keserwan-Jbeil Governorate in Lebanon. The town consists of the villages of Adma and Dafneh. The town is located 27 kilometers north of Beirut on a cliff facing South.

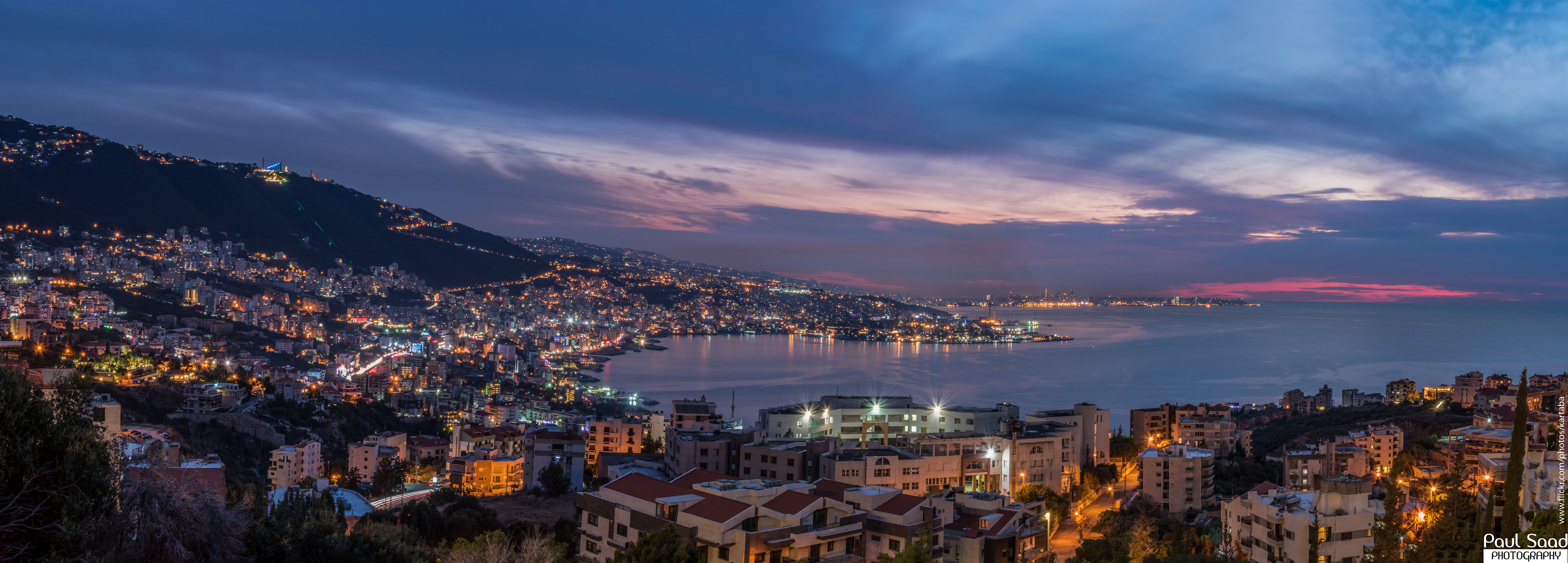
Jounieh at Sunset From Adma

Its elevation ranges between 100 and 330 meters above sea level and the town's total land area consists of 456 hectares. Adma wa Dafneh is markedly more vacant and vast than most Lebanese settlements, as it consists mostly of villas and aesthetically pleasing apartments as opposed to functional buildings and is strongly connected to Jounieh and Tabarja to its south and north respectively. Adma wa Dafneh's inhabitants are predominantly Maronite Christians.

== Etymology ==
"Adam" (𐤀𐤃𐤌 in Phoenician) is derived from red, and there is an etymological connection between adam and admah, admah designating "red clay" or "red ground" in a non-theological context. The Village of Adma was named after its fertile and rich soil which was covered by vegetation before urbanisation.

== Topography and history ==
=== Topography ===
Adma wa Dafneh is largely made up of sparse structures situated between thick brush and forestation on the limestone hillsides and cliffs of Kasrouane.

=== History ===
In February 1990, following the Taif agreement ending the 15-year Lebanese Civil War, the town was the site of a battle between the Lebanese Army and the Lebanese Forces militia (LF). Two hundred commandos loyal to General Michel Aoun were trapped in their base in Adma by Samir Geagea’s LF fighters until a truce was arranged, 17 February, to allow their evacuation. Traces of the fighting can still be seen. The town also features a ruined civil war-era structure with a hidden arms depository, now empty, that survived the war.

== Residency and accommodations ==
=== Residency ===
Adma wa Dafneh today is mostly home to the upper mid-class and the high society, as well as foreign diplomats and international business expatriates working in Lebanon. The town includes some of the most prestigious gated communities in Lebanon, such as BelHorizon Village and Admir. Mansions, large homes, as well as family buildings represent most of the dwellings in Adma.

=== Accommodations ===
The town has also managed to create its own ecosystem of accommodations which includes a Carrefour Market, convenience stores, gas stations, churches, a medical center, schools, restaurants, shops, hotels, etc.
