= Lycée de Ville =

French international school in Adonis, Lebanon

Lycée de Ville is a French international school in Adonis, Keserwan District, Lebanon. It serves petite section through terminale, the final year of lycée (senior high school). It was founded in 1995.
