= Jihan Gazawi Aony =

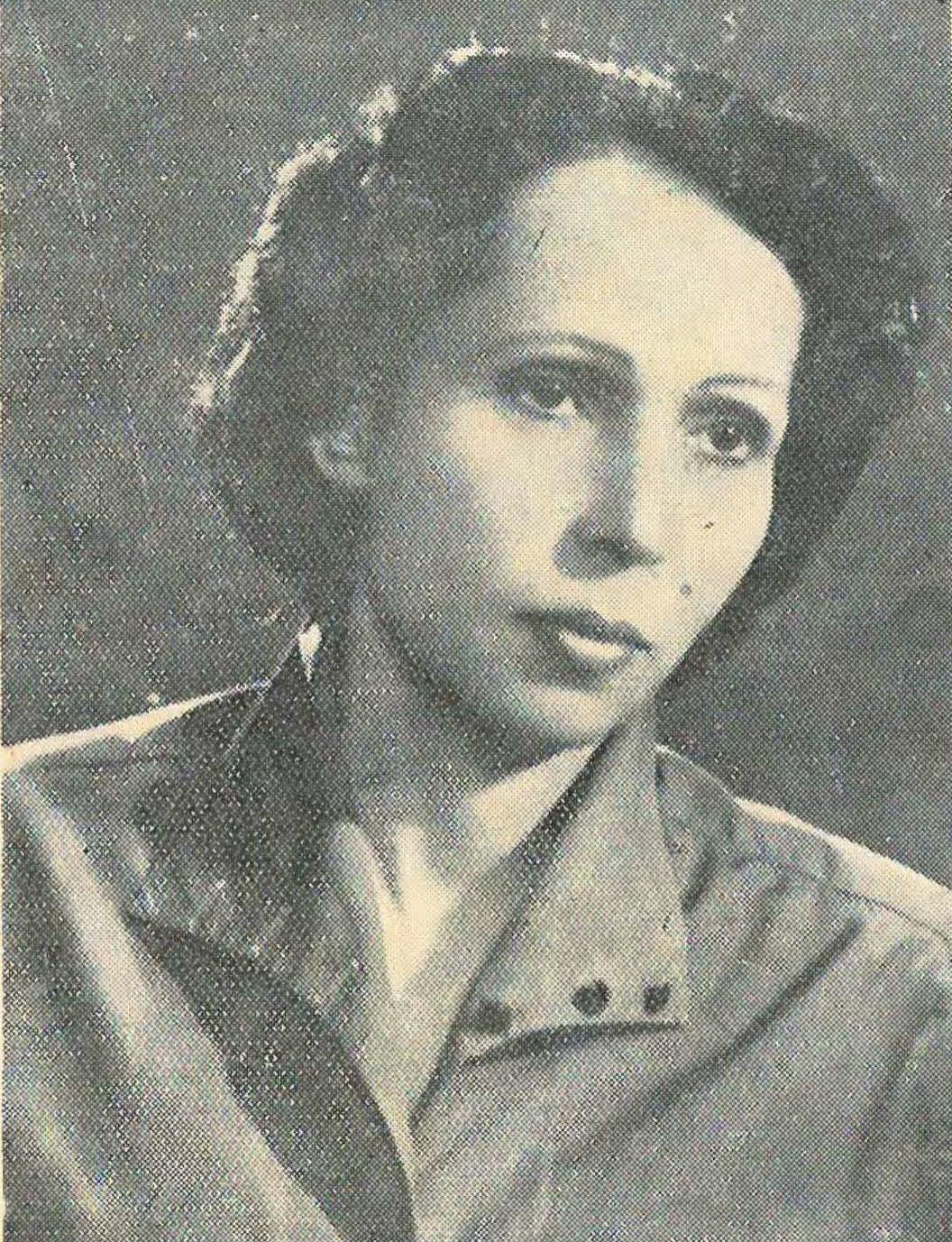
- Born: 1916–1918; Tripoli, Vilayet of Beirut, Ottoman Empire
- Died: September 1956 (aged 37–40); Tripoli, Lebanon
- Occupations: Short story writer, literary critic, school teacher and poet

Jahan Ghazzawi Aouni (Note: Arabic: جهان غزاوي عوني, romanised: Jīhān Ghazzāwī ʻAwnī) (1916 – September 1956) was a Lebanese writer, literary critic, and teacher. She taught from 1946 until her death at the age of 38 or 40. She has been known for her work in the area of women's empowerment, has contributed to many charitable social activities, and her home has been a literary salon. She left manuscript works, numerous articles and stories published in newspapers. She wrote several articles about May Ziadeh, and was well known for defending her in literary criticism.

== Biography ==
Jahan Ghazzawi was born in Tripoli in 1918 in the period of administration of occupied enemy territory or in 1916 in the Ottoman Tripoli period. From a young age, she wrote her thoughts about life and her feelings in the form of a short story or essay. She studied at the Tallian Institute in Tripoli. She had to drop out of school after her mother died to take care of the house. She began teaching in 1946, after the independence of Lebanon, working in Tripoli's official schools for 10 years. She was known for her particular teaching style, most notably "the duality of tenacity by imposing respect for order and by being agile and passionate in the course of fulfilling tasks."

In 1941, she married Tahsen Awni, the postmaster of Tripoli. Their children include Nassima Awni al-Khatib, who married Sami al-Khatib, and Hassan Walid Auni.

Ghazzawi died in September 1956.

== Literary career ==
She was a member of the Northern Literary Association. She wrote many articles in various literary journals, such as "The Voice of Women," "Etiquette," "The Letter," and "The Literature."

She exchanged messages with the literati of her time, including Samira Azam, and defended May Ziadeh's literary career.

=== Stories ===
In the Lebanese magazine "The Voice of Women," she wrote several stories and literary essays. Her stories published in 1952 are "The Gift of Destiny," "Happiness" and "The Game of Life." In her story "Saad," she talks about a poor student named Sahid, who was one of her students. Brie Issa Fatoh, writer of "Adipat Arab: Course and Studies", said that these three stories show: "A true spirit of motherhood, compassion for the poor, tormented and deprived, and for those small, vulnerable creatures who have not yet been able to make their way into life." He said of her style, "In Jahan Ghazwai's transparent and agile style, and in her smooth and sweet language, she tends to portray poetic words that she knows how to choose with elegance, fine taste, sound nature... And we don't see her abandoning this poetic style in everything she writes. If God had come to this talented, creative writing, she would have given us much of what she was destined to give."

=== Poetry ===
The book "The Literature of Tripoli and the North" brought attention to her writing, and a number of poems were published in the newspapers of her time. The Epistle of the Papyrus says of her poetry, "Her poetry revolves around her personal and emotional concerns. She tends to meditate on the night's slumber over the romantic habit of poets, and she has poetry calling for the rejection of melancholy, the hugging of life [...] a touch of mild grief that reveals the weariness of her sense, the warmth of her feelings. She wrote poetry with weight and rhyme, as she wrote it in what is known as action poetry, and wrote prose poem. Her language is flush and soft, and her imagination is energetic. It's diverse in its light and rhymes, highlighting its tendency to regenerate."

=== Studies and criticism ===
She is best known for her studies on Ziadeh and her defense in literary criticism. She and Em Faris Ibrahim had a wide-ranging discussion in the Telegraph literary supplement about Mei.

== Impact ==
She is a revered figure among some of Tripoli's elite, and they have paid tribute to her, including Maha Kayal, who said in 2009,

This Tripoli literary and intellectual figure distinguished herself through her various life activities. As a young girl, she contributed to the management of her parental home and later became a wife and mother, caring for a family of two and three children. These responsibilities, which were regarded as the primary occupations of girls of her generation, were not sufficient to contain her considerable energy and abilities. She therefore devoted herself to education, attending school from 1946 to 1956, while also developing her literary talents, many of whose works were published in various magazines. Her literary contributions were also widely presented through Lebanese radio. In addition to these intellectual and literary pursuits, she played an important role as a social activist in a field to which she was deeply devoted.
