= Bqaatouta =

Village on the upper mountains of Keserwan District, Lebanon

Bqaatouta (Arabic: بقعتوتا, romanized: Bqaʿtūtā) is a village located on the upper mountains of Keserwan District, Lebanon, at an average altitude of 1,300 metres aboved sea level. Its population is around 1,650 persons (Maronites). It is 45 kilometres from Beirut. It is known for its dry and healthy air as well as for its apple gardens. It has a historic monastery (1767) dedicated to St Mary and two other old churches. It is home for the Sannine bottled water company. Other important employers include the Hajj concrete and construction company. The village is surrounded by the highest peaks of Metn and Keserwan and lies at the sources of the dog river (Nahr el Kalb) separating the two casas; Bqaatouta Municipality was created in 2009 and is working closely to transform the infrastructure of the village into a modern and environmentally friendly one. Among these improvements were changes to the houses drains, which are recuperated into a natural waste water treatment facility located on the lower part of the village and functioning only on Rheed beds; one of the largest of its type in Lebanon. . More recently, the municipality managed, through international donation, to secure photovoltaic systems to all the village houses. Bqaatouta falls also on the LMT (Lebanon Mountain Trail) trail in the midsection between Kfardebian and Baskinta. in 2020 it created a "Heritage trail" linking several archeological, natural and traditional points of interest.
