= Kfar Yassine =

Kfar Yassine كفر ياسين
- Village
- Location in Lebanon
- Coordinates: 34°1′30″N 35°38′1″E
- Country: Lebanon
- Governorate: Keserwan-Jbeil
- District: Keserwan

Area
  - Total: 4.56 km^{2} (1.76 sq mi)
- Elevation: 10 m (33 ft)
- Time zone: UTC+2 (EET)
  - Summer (DST): UTC+3 (EEST)
- Dialing code: +961

Kfar Yassine (Arabic: كفر ياسين, romanized: Kfar Yāsīn) is a village in the Keserwan District of the Keserwan-Jbeil in Lebanon. It is part of the municipality of Tabarja-KfarYassine. The municipality is located 24 kilometers north of Beirut. Its average elevation is 10 meters above sea level and its total land area is 456 hectares. Kfar Yassine's inhabitants are predominantly Maronite Christians.
