= Ghidras =

Ghadras غدراس
- Municipality
- Location in Lebanon
- Coordinates: 34°2′39″N 35°40′45″E
- Country: Lebanon
- Governorate: Keserwan-Jbeil
- District: Keserwan

Government
  - Type: town

Area
  - Total: 3.55 km^{2} (1.37 sq mi)
- Elevation: 500 m (1,600 ft)
- Time zone: UTC+2 (EET)
  - Summer (DST): +3

Ghadras (Arabic: غدراس, romanized: Ghadrās) is a village and municipality in the Keserwan District of the Keserwan-Jbeil Governorate of Lebanon. It is located 30 kilometers north of Beirut. It has an average elevation between 500 and 700 meters above sea level and a total land area of 355 hectares. Ghadras's name is derived from Syriac root words for "Small Water walk", as the village was known for its numerous Water walks. Ghadras is divided into four major parts: Main Village, Quarsa, Hellan, and Almdar. The inhabitants of Ghadras are predominantly Maronite Catholics.
