= May Ziadeh =

Lebanese-Palestinian writer (1886–1941)

May Ziadeh مي زيادة
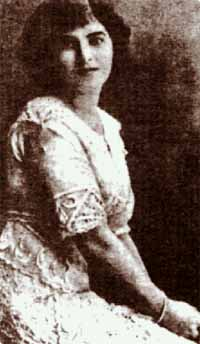
- Born: 11 February 1886; Nazareth, Palestine, Acre Sanjak, Ottoman Empire
- Died: 17 October 1941 (aged 55); Cairo, Kingdom of Egypt
- Occupation: Writer
- Writing career
- Pen name: Isis Copia

May Elias Ziadeh (/ziˈɑːdə/ zee-AH-də; Arabic: مي إلياس زيادة, ALA-LC: Mayy Ilyās Ziyādah; (Note: Also transcribed Ziadé, Ziyada, Ziyadah, Ziyadeh.) 11 February 1886 – 17 October 1941) was a Lebanese-Palestinian Maronite poet, essayist, and translator, who wrote many different works both in Arabic and in French.

Born in Nazareth, Palestine to a Lebanese father and a Palestinian mother, Ziadeh attended school in her native city and in Lebanon, before immigrating along with her family to Egypt in 1908. She started publishing her works in French (under the pen name Isis Copia) in 1911, and Kahlil Gibran entered into a correspondence with her in 1912. Being a prolific writer, she wrote for Arabic-language newspapers and periodicals, along with publishing poems and books. May Elias Ziadeh held one of the most famous literary salons in the modern Arab world in the year 1921. After suffering some personal losses at the beginning of the 1930s, she came back to Lebanon where her relatives placed her in a psychiatric hospital. After a hunger strike and a public campaign for her release, she was able to leave the hospital in 1938. Shortly after, she moved to Cairo where she later died.

Ziadeh was one of the key figures of the Nahda in the early 20th-century Middle Eastern literary scene and a "pioneer of Oriental feminism."

== Biography ==
=== Early and personal life ===
May Ziadeh was the daughter of Elias Zakhur Ziadeh, a Lebanese Maronite from Chahtoul village and Nuzha Khalil Mu'mar, a Palestinian Christian whose family was originally from Hauran, Syria, settled in the early 19th century She was born in Nazareth, Ottoman Palestine. Her father had been a teacher and the editor of Al Mahrūsah.

May Elias Ziadeh attended primary school in Nazareth. As her father came to the Keserwan region of Mount Lebanon, she was sent at the age of 14 to Aintoura to pursue her secondary studies at a French convent school for girls. Her studies in Aintoura exposed her to French and Romantic literature, to which she took a particular liking. She attended several Roman Catholic schools in Lebanon before returning to Nazareth in the year 1904 to be with her parents. She is reported to have published her first articles at the age of 16. In 1908, she and her family immigrated to Egypt.

Ziadeh never married, but from 1912 onward, she maintained an extensive written correspondence with one of the literary giants of the twentieth century, the Lebanese-American poet and writer Khalil Gibran. Although the pair never met, the correspondence lasted 19 years until his death in 1931.

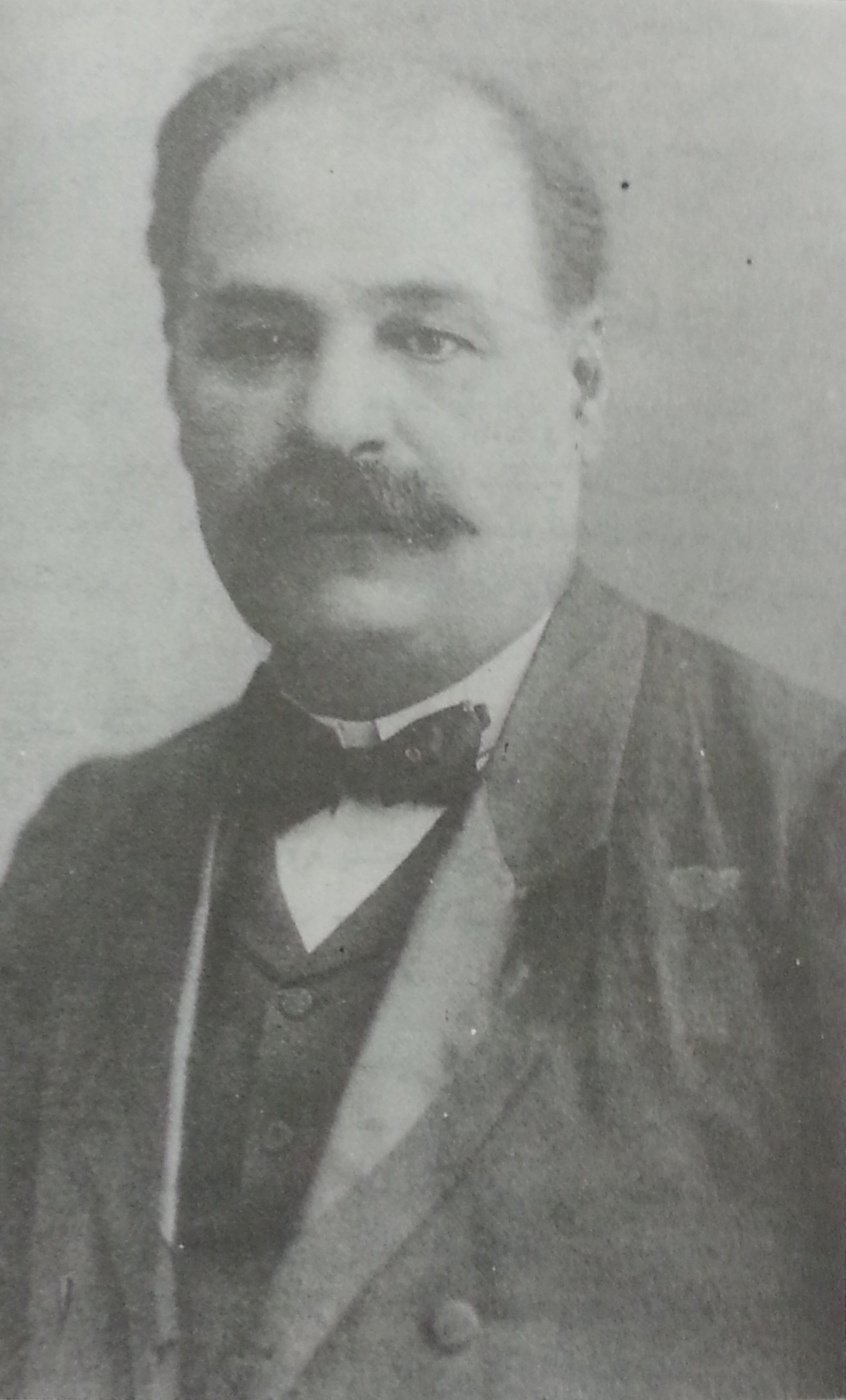
May's father, Elias Ziadeh

Between 1928 and 1932, Ziadeh suffered a series of personal losses, beginning with the death of her parents, a number of her friends, and above all Khalil Gibran. She fell into a deep depression and returned to Lebanon where her relatives placed her in a psychiatric hospital to gain control over her estate. Nawal El Saadawi alleges that Ziadeh was sent to the hospital for expressing feminist sentiments. Ziadeh was profoundly humiliated and incensed by this decision; she eventually recovered and left after a medical report proved that she was of sound mental health. She returned to Cairo where she died on October 17, 1941.

=== Journalism and language studies ===
Ziadeh's father founded Al Mahroussah newspaper while the family was in Egypt. She contributed to a number of articles. She also published articles in Al Hilal, Al Ahram and Al Muqtataf.

Ziadeh was particularly interested in learning languages. She studied privately at home alongside her French-Catholic education, and later at a local university for a Modern Languages degree while in Egypt. She graduated in 1917. As a result, Ziadeh was completely bilingual in Arabic and French, and had working knowledge of English, Italian, German, Syriac (as an integral part of her ethnoreligious Lebanese Maronite identity), Spanish, Latin, as well as Modern Greek.

=== Key Middle Eastern literary figure ===
Ziadeh was well known in Middle Eastern literary circles, receiving many male and female writers and intellectuals at a literary salon she established in 1912 (and which Egyptian poet Gamila El Alaily attempted to emulate after Ziadeh's death). Among those that frequented the salon were Taha Hussein, Khalil Moutrane, Ahmed Lutfi el-Sayed, Anton Gemayel, Walieddine Yakan, Abbas el-Akkad and Yaqub Sarruf. Ziadeh is credited with introducing the work of Khalil Gibran to the Egyptian public.

== Philosophical views ==
=== Feminism and Orientalism ===
Unlike her peers Princess Nazli Fazil and Huda Sha'arawi, May Ziadeh was more a 'woman of letters' than a social reformer. However, she was also involved in the women's emancipation movement. Ziadeh was deeply concerned with the emancipation of the Middle Eastern woman; a task to be effected first by tackling ignorance, and then anachronistic traditions. She considered women to be the basic elements of every human society and wrote that a woman enslaved could not breastfeed her children with her own milk when that milk smelled strongly of servitude.

She specified that female evolution towards equality need not be enacted at the expense of femininity, but rather that it was a parallel process. In 1921, she convened a conference under the heading, "Le but de la vie" ("The goal of life"), where she called upon Middle Eastern women to aspire toward freedom, and to be open to the Occident without forgetting their Oriental identity. Despite her death in 1941 her writings still represent the ideals of the first wave of Lebanese feminism. Ziadeh believed in liberating women and the first wave focused on doing just that through education, receiving voting rights, and finally having representation in government.

=== Romanticism ===
Bearing a romantic streak from childhood, Ziadeh was successively influenced by Lamartine, Byron, Shelley, and finally Gibran. These influences are evident in the majority of her works. She often reflected on her nostalgia for Lebanon and her fertile, vibrant, sensitive imagination is as evident as her mystery, melancholy and despair.

== Works ==
Ziadeh's first published work, Fleurs de rêve (1911), was a volume of poetry, written in French, using the pen name of Isis Copia. She wrote quite extensively in French, and occasionally English or Italian, but as she matured she increasingly found her literary voice in Arabic. She published works of criticism and biography, volumes of free-verse poetry and essays, and novels. She translated several European authors into Arabic, including Arthur Conan Doyle from English, Brada (the Italian Contessa Henriette Consuelo di Puliga) from French, and Max Müller from German. She hosted the most famous literary salon during the twenties and thirties in Cairo.

Well noted titles of her works in Arabic (with English translation in brackets) include:

- Bâhithat el-Bâdiya باحثة البادية ("Seeker in the Desert", pen name of Malak Hifni Nasif)
- Sawâneh fatât سوانح فتاة (Platters of Crumbs)
- Zulumât wa Ichâ'ât ظلمات وإشاعات (Humiliation and Rumors...)
- Kalimât wa Ichârât كلمات وإشارات (Words and Signs)
- Al Saha'ef الصحائف (The Newspapers)
- Ghayat Al-Hayât غاية الحياة (The Meaning of Life)
- Al-Musâwât المساواة (Equality)
- Bayna l-Jazri wa l-Madd بين الجزر والمد (Between the Ebb and Flow)

=== Feminist works ===
Ziadeh is considered by many as integral to the feminist movement having published many autobiographies of women between 1919-1925, this was part of her advocacy for the empowerment of women, examples of women featured in her work include Egyptian feminist Malak Hifni Nassef in her book Bahithat-ul-Badia. She was credited as being the first woman to use the term "women's cause" in the Middle East according to critic Hossam Aql, "She was the first professional writer to take a critical approach to women's stories or novels". Her fiction often included strong female characters and discussed the condition of Middle Eastern women, for example in one of her short stories, she illustrates the evil of frequent divorce and remarriage which she blames on men and patriarchal society.

== Awards ==
In 1999, May Ziadeh was named by the Lebanese Minister of Culture as the personage of the year around which the annual celebration of "Beirut, cultural capital of the Arab world" would be held.

== Legacy ==
A Google Doodle on 11 February 2012 commemorated Ziadeh's 126th birth anniversary.

== Other ==
- "Goodbye Lebanon", trans. Rose DeMaris In Virginia's Sisters: An Anthology of Women's Writings, London: Aurora Metro Books, 2023. ISBN 9781912430789

== See also ==
- Women's literary salons and societies in the Arab world
