= Bekaata Kenaan =

Village in Keserwen District, Lebanon

Coordinates: 33°57′49″N 35°46′06″E

Beqaatet Kenaan (Arabic: بقعاتة كنعان) is a village located in the mountains of the Keserwen District, Lebanon, at an elevation ranging between 900 and 1,250 meters above sea level. Its population is around 1500 people, most of whom belong to the Maronite Christian community. The village is approximately 50 kilometres away from Beirut and covers a total surface area of around 3 million square meters. Bekaatet Kenaan is known for its mild climate, fresh air, and fruit cultivation (apples, peaches and cherrys) that offer scenic views of the surrounding Metn and Keserwen mountains. Despite its small population, Bekaatet Kenaan holds cultural and religious significance. It is home to an old chapel dedicated to Saint Abda. The community celebrates several annual feasts and maintains a strong connection to traditional village life. In recent years, the municipality of Bekaatet Kenaan has focused on improving local infrastructure while preserving the village's environmental and architectural identity. The village is also located near several eco-touristic trails and has become a modest destination for hikers and nature enthusiasts seeking a peaceful retreat in the Lebanese mountains. Its location near the Lebanon Mountain Trail (LMT) (with section 13,14 and Literary trail passing through the town) allows trekkers to pass through or rest in the village as they journey through the central highlands. Since 2013, a dam project intended to store water, has been under construction near the village, though it remains under construction to this day.
