= Okaibe =

Okaibe عقيبة
- Municipality
- Location in Lebanon
- Coordinates: 34.056°N 35.643°E
- Country: Lebanon
- Governorate: Keserwan-Jbeil
- District: Keserwan

Area
  - Total: 1.5 km^{2} (0.58 sq mi)
- Elevation: 10 m (33 ft)
- Highest elevation: 300 m (980 ft)
- Lowest elevation: 0 m (0 ft)

Population (2021)
  - Total: 12,500
  - Density: 8,300/km^{2} (22,000/sq mi)
- Time zone: UTC+2 (EET)
  - Summer (DST): UTC+3 (EEST)
- Dialing code: +961

Okaibe (Arabic: عقيبة, romanized: ʿOqaybeh) is a coastal village in Keserwan-Jbeil Governorate in Lebanon, well known for its public sandy beach, fishing port and market. It is a mix of a semi urban lively market street, and three distinctive residential areas situated on elevated ground and overlooking the coast. The river of "Nahr Ibrahim" runs through Okaibe and flows into the sea along the famous sandy beach. Historically a fishing community, with exclusively local residents, Okaibe has recently opened up through small scale real-estate investments that boosted the population growth. The overwhelming majority of the population is Christian and particularly Maronite Catholic.

== Geography ==
Okaibe is located around 27 km (17 mi) north of Beirut, in the district of Keserwan. The city has a 2 km (1.2 mi) coastal front consisting of sandy and rocky beaches along with a remarkable crystal blue water. Moreover, it is renowned for the year-long running river known as " Nahr Ibrahim".

The city is bordered by Nahr Ibrahim and Zaytoun to the north, Bouar to the South, and Al-Nammoura to the east.

The five Communal areas in Okaibe are Al-Mina (Arabic translation for "port"), Boukak El Dine, Kfarchiham, Kmayrze and Jazayer Nahr Ibrahim.

== Demographics ==
Okaibe has an estimated population of 12,500 as of 2021, they are predominantly Maronite Catholics.

== Religious sites ==
Maronite churches are a common site in Okaibe, with 6 churches, 2 monasteries, and 2 chapels. Notably, there is also 1 Hindu temple for the Indian community residing in the area.
