= Sarba, Lebanon =

Sarba صربا
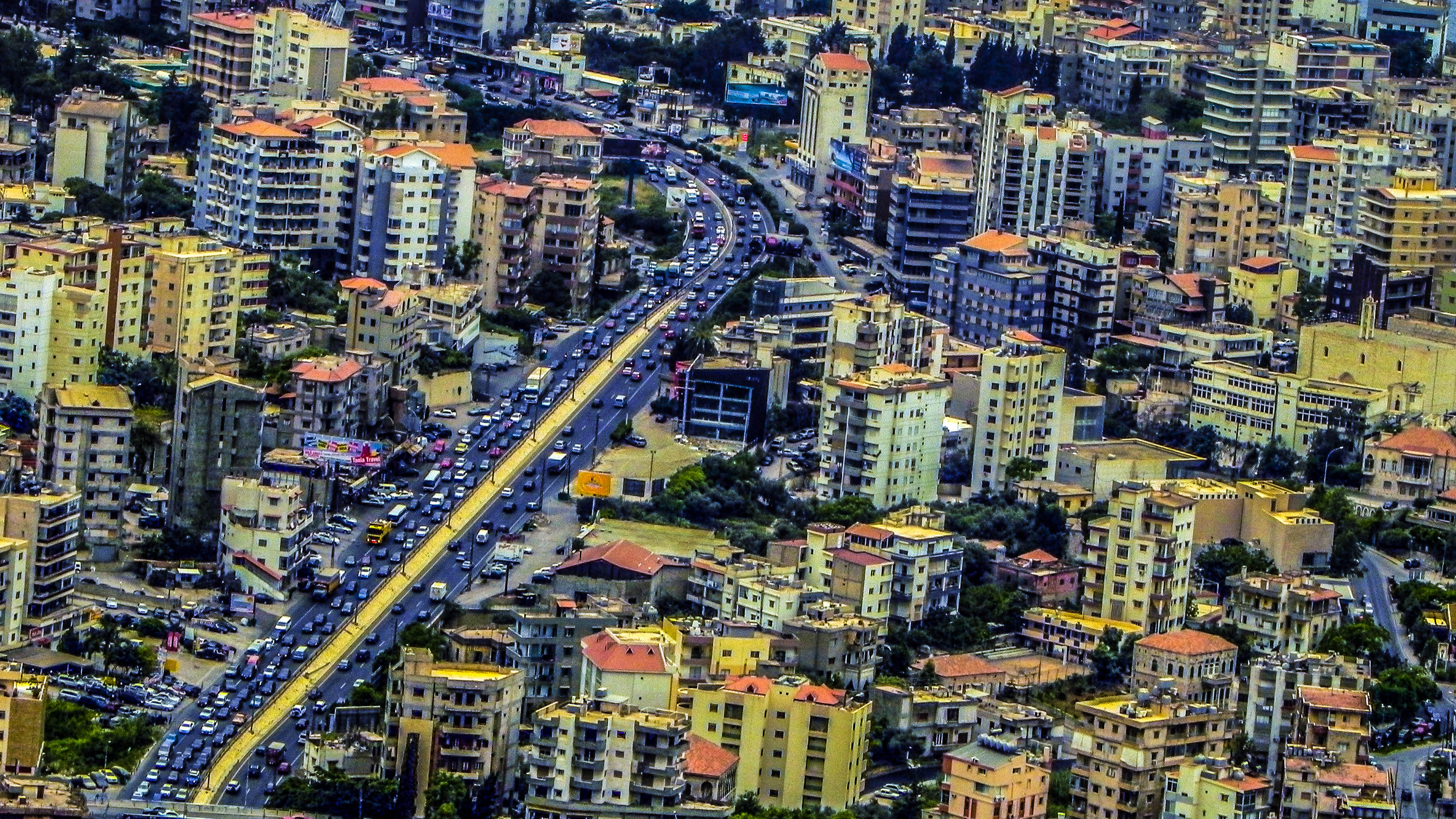
- Sarba, seen from Harissa

- Location in Lebanon
- Coordinates: 33°58′38.8″N 35°37′06.1″E
- Country: Lebanon
- Governorate: Keserwan-Jbeil
- District: Keserwan
- Time zone: UTC+2 (EET)
  - Summer (DST): +3

Sarba (Arabic: صربا, romanized: Ṣarbā) is a town located in the Keserwan District of the Keserwan-Jbeil Governorate in Lebanon.

== History ==
In 1838, Eli Smith noted Serba as a village located in "Aklim el-Kesrawan, Northeast of Beirut; the chief seat of the Maronites".

During the Great Famine of Mount Lebanon in 1916, five villagers did of starvation.

== See also ==
- Jounieh, nearby coastal city; article includes historical data about Sarba

== Bibliography ==
- Robinson, E.; Smith, E. (1841). Biblical Researches in Palestine, Mount Sinai and Arabia Petraea: A Journal of Travels in the year 1838. Vol. 3. Boston: Crocker & Brewster.
