= Ghazir =

Ghazir غزير
- Municipality
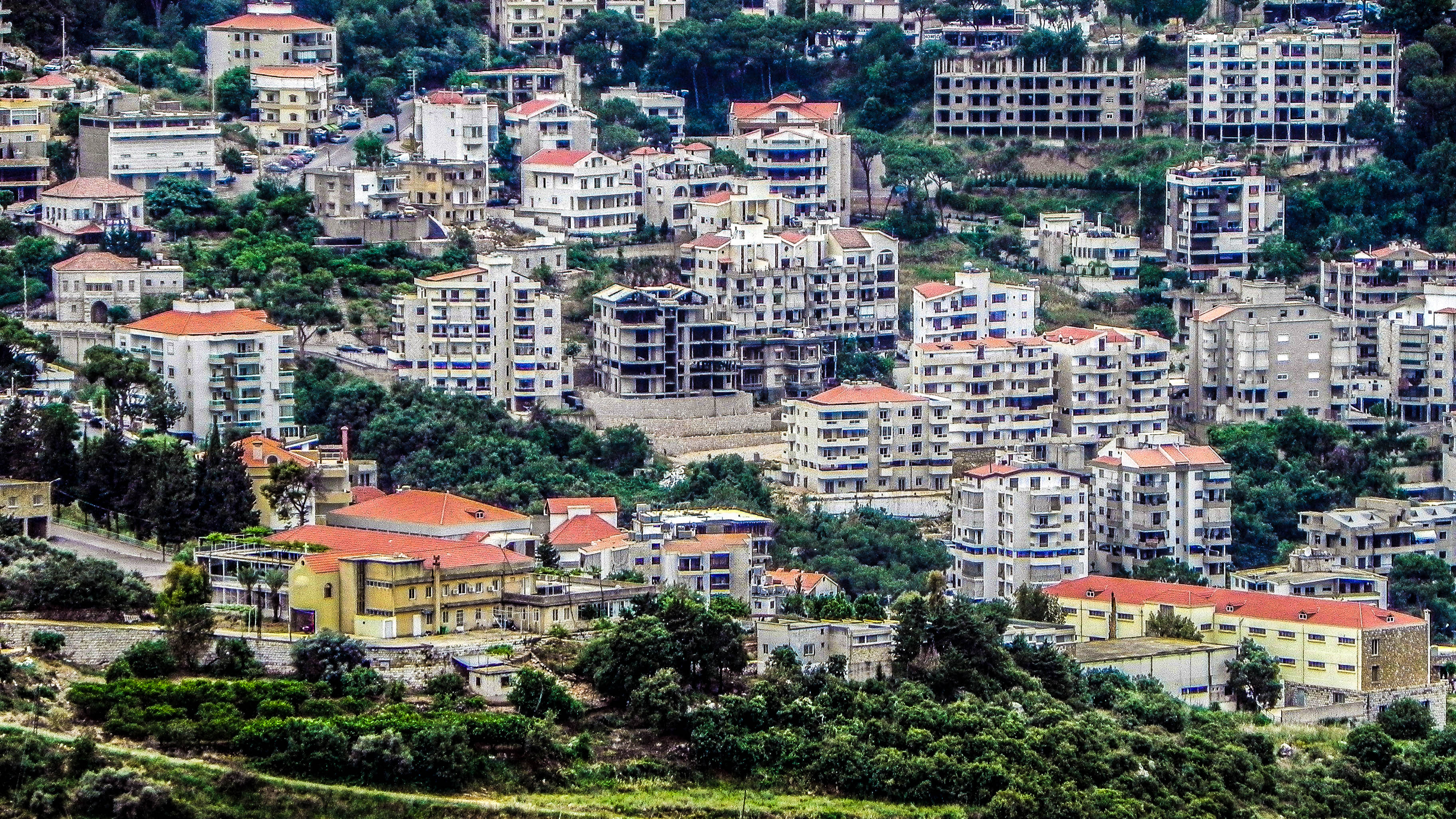
- Ghazir

- Location in Lebanon
- Coordinates: 34°1′4″N 35°39′50″E
- Country: Lebanon
- Governorate: Keserwan-Jbeil
- District: Keserwan

Government
  - Type: Municipally
  - Mayor: Christophe Bassil

Area
  - Total: 5.42 km^{2} (2.09 sq mi)
- Elevation: 380 m (1,250 ft)
- Time zone: UTC+2 (EET)
  - Summer (DST): +3

Ghazir (Arabic: غزير, romanized: Ghazīr) is a town and municipality in the Keserwan District of the Keserwan-Jbeil Governorate of Lebanon. It is located 27 kilometres (17 mi) north of Beirut. It has an average elevation of 380 meters above sea level and a total land area of 542 hectares (2.09 sq mi).

Ghazir is divided into three major parts: Ghazir el-Fawka, Central Ghazir, and Kfarhbab. The inhabitants of Ghazir are predominantly Maronite Catholics. The town has four schools, two public and two private, with a total of 3,253 students as of 2008. Maameltein is part of the Ghazir village.

== Etymology ==
Ghazir's name is derived from Arabic root words for "heavy rains", and the town is known for its numerous groundwater reserves.

== History ==
=== Mamluk period ===
In the 13th century, when Ghazir was a small village, the Mamluk army invaded Keserwan and destroyed Ghazir among other villages of the district. However, at the time, the local Maronite militias were able to repel the Mamluks. The latter returned in 1305, launching a third surprise offensive against the Keserwani Maronites, massacring or exiling many of them. According to Lebanese historian Kamal Salibi, the Mamluks' target in the Keserwan campaigns were the Alawite and Shia Muslims who dominated the region. Afterward, the Mamluks garrisoned troops in Ghazir under the command of Suleiman Ibn 'Arab to guard the sea route between Tabarja and the Nahr al-Kalb river. The garrisoned force consisted of Sunni Muslim Turkmen tribesmen, who made Ghazir their headquarters in their ensuing feudal rivalry with the Druze Tanukh tribe that dominated southern Mount Lebanon.

Following its integration into the Mamluk Sultanate, Ghazir came under the jurisdiction of Wilayat Bayrut (Beirut District), part of the Safaqa al-Shamaliya (Northern Region) centered in Baalbek, which was part of the larger Mamlakat Dimashq (Damascus Province). The Turkmen emirs of Keserwan, like their Buhturid counterparts in southern Mount Lebanon, were able to hold onto their iqta'at (fiefs) in Keserwan and pass ownership to their descendants, which was atypical of iqta-holders under the Mamluks, who had to be frequently appointed by the authorities. The names of only four Turkmen emirs of Keserwan are known, a certain Sa'id, who was emir in 1361, his brother and successor 'Isa, and Ali ibn al-A'ma and his brother Umar ibn al-A'ma. The latter two were involved in the Mamluk rebellion led by Yalbugha an-Nasiri of Aleppo against the new sultan Barquq in 1389. Ali was killed when Barquq returned to power and sent an expedition against the Turkmens of Keserwan, while Umar was imprisoned and later released. Afterward, little information is known about the Turkmen, who continued to hold the Keserwan through the end of the Mamluk era in 1516.

=== Ottoman era ===
==== 'Assaf period ====
The Ottoman Empire conquered the region after defeating the Mamluks in 1516. The Ottomans granted the 'Assaf clan control over Keserwan in addition to tax farms in the surrounding region. Moreover, the 'Assaf became the dominant political power in the Tripoli region. In 1517, Emir Assaf moved his family's headquarters from the Turkmen-dominated coastal villages and the Nahr al-Kalb ridge to Ghazir. The move to Ghazir likely contributed to the gradual deterioration of relations between the Assafs and the Turkmens, while at the same time bringing the Assafs socially and politically closer to the Maronites who lived in the interior of Keserwan. Ottoman tax records indicate Ghazir had 20 a population of 16 Christian and 3 Muslim households in 1523, 21 Christian and 14 Muslim households and 3 Christian bachelors in 1530, and 20 Christian and 4 Muslim households and 2 Christian bachelors in 1543.

Throughout the rule of Emir Mansur Assaf (r. 1528–1579), he eliminated his Sunni and Shia Muslim rivals in northern Mount Lebanon and the Tripoli region, including a massacre of several Bedouin tribesmen from the Ibn al-Hansh at a reception in his Ghazir headquarters. Emir Mansur maintained policies favorable to the Maronite clans of northern Mount Lebanon, who he did not view to be as dangerous of a threat to his power as his Muslim rivals, and encouraged their resettlement of Keserwan. Among these Maronite clans were the Khazens and Gemayels, but Mansur developed particularly strong ties with the Hubaysh family, who settled in Ghazir itself in 1517–1518 and served as the 'Assaf's chief political agents.

The 'Assaf emirs launched numerous building works in Ghazir, including the construction of a Serail on the site of the Convent of St. Francis, a mosque, bathhouses, hydraulic installations and gardens. Emir Mansur's successor, Emir Muhammad, returned to Mount Lebanon in 1585 after being exiled for his part in a rebellion against the authorities. Upon his return, he assigned members of the Shia Muslim Hamade clan as his deputies for the Byblos region and had them based in Ghazir. After Emir Muhammad's death without a male heir in 1591, Yusuf Pasha Sayfa married Muhammad's widow, confiscated 'Assaf properties in Ghazir and had the heads of the Hubaysh clan, Sheikh Yusuf Hubaysh and the latter's nephew Mansur executed. Also following Emir Muhammad's death, the Hamade succeeded the 'Assaf in northern Mount Lebanon. However, before the end of the 16th century, the Hamade relocated their headquarters from Ghazir to Tripoli.

==== Sayfa and Ma'an period ====
In 1613, Yusuf Sayfa Pasha installed his sons Husayn Pasha and Hasan Bey in Ghazir to maintain Sayfa control over Keserwan. The following year, however, the Ottoman authorities stripped Yusuf Pasha of control over Keserwan, but the Sayfas refused to withdraw. Consequently, the newly appointed governor of Sidon Sanjak, of which Keserwan was part, attempted to oust the Sayfas, but his forces were repelled. In January 1616, the imperial authorities once more ordered the Sayfas to withdraw from Ghazir to no avail. However, the Druze Ma'an dynasty gained state support for moving against the Sayfas, their longtime foes, and defeated the Sayfas in confrontations at the coastal villages of Damour and Na'ameh south of Beirut. As a result, Yusuf Pasha withdrew his sons and forces from Ghazir, which came under Maanid control. The Ma'ans restored Ghazir as the headquarters of the Hubaysh clan. In 1665 Sheikh Turabay Hubaysh commissioned the construction of the Mar Elias Monastery in Ghazir. Ahmad Ma'an, the ruler of the Mount Lebanon Emirate, appointed Talib and Turabay Hubaysh as the governors of Ghazir in 1670.

==== Shihab period ====
In 1709, the Hubaysh clan provided safe haven for Emir Haydar Shihab, the Sunni Muslim head of the Druze Qaysi faction, in Ghazir after he was forced out of the Chouf by his rivals in the Druze Yamani faction. The commander of the latter, Mahmoud Abi Harmush, pursued Haydar to Ghazir, attacking and plundering the town with the assistance of the Ottoman troops of Sidon Eyalet's governor, Bashir Pasha al-Matarji. In 1711, Emir Haydar led the Qaysis to a decisive victory over the Banu Yaman tribe at the Battle of Ain Dara. That year, members of the Shihab clan settled in Ghazir, which became a refuge for Emir Yusuf Shihab in 1778 when his tax farms in the Chouf were transferred to his brothers Sayyid-Ahmad and Efendi by Sidon governor Ahmad Pasha al-Jazzar. Emir Yusuf was restored to Chouf after paying a bribe to al-Jazzar later that year.

In 1767, Emir Bashir Shihab II was born in Ghazir, where he was also baptized by Capuchin friars based in the town. Emir Bashir would later succeed Emir Yusuf as the ruler of the Mount Lebanon Emirate. As part of Emir Bashir's centralization and reorganization efforts in Mount Lebanon following his destruction of his erstwhile Druze allies' feudal power, he appointed a Maronite bishop as qadi (chief judge) and based him in Ghazir. The bishop was one of Bashir's three chief judges, who were given the judicial authority traditionally held by the Druze feudal lords; the other two judges were a Maronite deacon based in Zgharta and a Druze sheikh based in Deir el-Qamar. Emir Bashir's brother, Emir Hasan, initiated the construction of a palace, a qaysariyah (silk market) and a souk (open-air market) in Ghazir in 1804.

==== Qaymaqamate and Mutasarrifate period ====
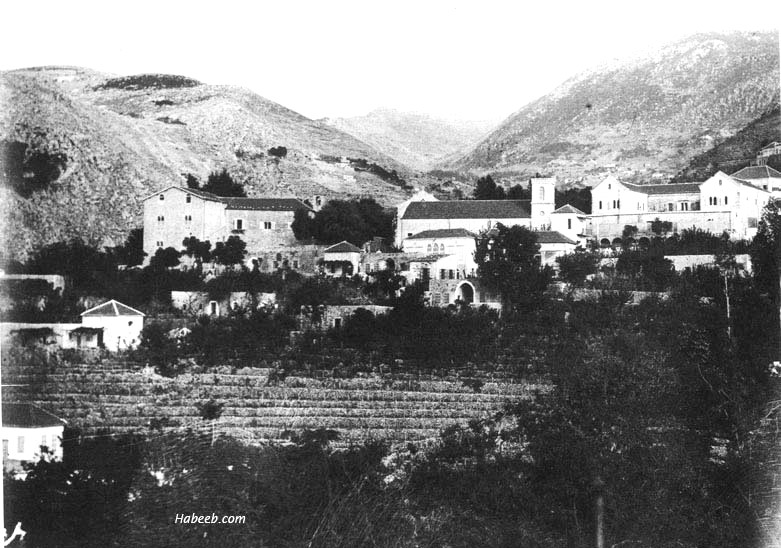
Ghazir in 1893

In 1843, the Jesuits established the Jesuit College in Ghazir to teach the local Maronite clergy. The Jesuit College (also called the Ghazir Seminary) became the center of the Jesuits' missionary activity in Lebanon and their largest seminary in the Middle East. The seminary was an addition to a boys secondary school they built in Ghazir in the 1840s. The local artist Daoud Corm (1852–1930) was discovered by the friars of Ghazir, which was his mother's hometown, and they employed him as a painting instructor in the Ghazir Seminary in 1862. Ghazir became the canvas of Corm's early works. The Ghazir Seminary was also where historian Henri Lammens received an education, and, in 1861, was a literary retreat for French historian and philosopher Ernest Renan. The French writer and politician Édouard Lockroy spent a considerable amount of time in Ghazir where he befriended several of the town's residents. In 1875, the Ghazir Seminary was relocated to Beirut and renamed the Saint Joseph University or simply the "Jesuit College". In 1886, a municipality was established to administer the local affairs of Ghazir.

=== Modern era ===
Ghazir remained a major political and economic center in Mount Lebanon until the end of the 19th century. In 1905, Muzaffar Pasha, the governor of the Mount Lebanon Mutasarrifate, built a second serail in the town. However, during the early years of the 20th century, Ghazir's regional role declined as Mount Lebanon was politically reorganized. With the establishment of the modern Lebanese Republic in 1946, Ghazir did not see a political revival. However, the town and the Keserwan region in general saw an influx of Christians coming from other parts of Lebanon during the 1975–1990 Lebanese Civil War.

The significant boom in the population during the civil war put a burden on the Ghazir Municipality's capabilities and led to major changes to the town's traditional architectural heritage, which had remained largely undisturbed through the 1960s. Modern buildings were constructed and roads were built and widened in the old core of the town. To make way for the new infrastructure, a part of the old souk and several old houses were demolished. As of 2003, the Ghazir Municipality undertook efforts to preserve Ghazir's traditional architecture, particularly with regards to the old souk, the 'Assaf Mosque and the old serail.

== Geography ==
Ghazir is situated in the region of Keserwan, overlooking the bay of Jounieh. The town is located 27 kilometers north of the Lebanese capital, Beirut. Its average elevation is 380 meters above sea level and its total land area consists of 542 hectares (5.42 square kilometers). The town rests on beds of limestone and marl.

Ghazir sees an average of 81 days of rain annually, with an average rainfall of 1.071 millimeters. The town is known for the numerous groundwater reserves that are present in its environs. However, Ghazir lacked a reservoir to store water, leading to significant losses of rainwater and limited access to water in Ghazir and the villages in its vicinity. In response, the Agency for Technical Cooperation and Development, with German and UN funding, built a reservoir in the town with a capacity of 1,000 cubed meters.

== Demographics ==
As of 2003, Ghazir had an estimated population of 27,000, of which about 9,000 were native to Ghazir. The inhabitants are predominantly Maronite Catholics, but there are also Christians from other denominations. Almost all churches in Ghazir (eleven out of twelve) are Maronite churches, and the remaining one located in lower Kfarhbab is Orthodox. Ghazir's major families are Ghazal, Frem, Bakhos, Chlela, Tayah, Haddad, Slaiby, Ghobeira, Zeenny, Zayek, Awaida, Nasr and many others.

== Economy ==
Ghazir's traditional economy during the Ottoman era centered on silk production, although that industry is now extinct in the town. However, other old traditional industries survive in Ghazir, including tapestry manufacturing, straw furniture-making, ironwork and wine and olive oil production. The town's modern economy is centered on small businesses and the town's role as a summertime resort. As of 2008, there were 32 companies with over five employees operating in Ghazir.

== Bibliography ==
- Bakhit, Muhammad Adnan Salamah (February 1972). The Ottoman Province of Damascus in the Sixteenth Century (PhD). School of Oriental and African Studies, University of London.
- Dau, Butros (1984). History of the Maronites: Religious, Cultural, and Political. Butros Dau.
- Harris, William (2012). Lebanon: A History, 600–2011. Oxford University Press. ISBN 9780195181111.
- Salameh, Franck (2010). Language, Memory, and Identity in the Middle East: The Case for Lebanon. Lexington Books. ISBN 9780739137406.
- Salibi, Kamal (June 1967). "Northern Lebanon under the dominance of Ġazīr (1517–1591)". Arabica. 14 (2): 144–166. doi:10.1163/157005867X00029. JSTOR 4055631.
- Winter, Stefan (2010). The Shiites of Lebanon under Ottoman Rule, 1516–1788. Cambridge University Press. ISBN 9781139486811.
