= Sehaileh =

Sehaileh سهيلة
- Municipality
- Location in Lebanon
- Coordinates: 33°57′21″N 35°39′22″E
- Country: Lebanon
- Governorate: Mount Lebanon
- District: Keserwan

Area
  - Total: 2.21 km^{2} (0.85 sq mi)
- Elevation: 550 m (1,800 ft)
- Time zone: UTC+2 (EET)
  - Summer (DST): UTC+3 (EEST)
- Dialing code: +961

Sehaileh (Levantine Arabic: سهيلة, romanized: Sehayleh; also spelled Seheileh or Shayleh) is a municipality in the Keserwan District of the Mount Lebanon Governorate in Lebanon. It is located 25 kilometers north of Beirut. Its average elevation is 550 meters above sea level and its total land area is 221 hectares. Sehaileh's inhabitants are predominantly Maronite Christians.
