= Chnaniir =

Chnaniir شننعير
- Village
- Location in Lebanon
- Coordinates: 34°0′20″N 35°39′51″E
- Country: Lebanon
- Governorate: Keserwan-Jbeil
- District: Keserwan
- Elevation: 1,250 ft (380 m)
- Time zone: UTC+2 (EET)
  - Summer (DST): +3

Chnaniir (Arabic: شننعير, romanized: Shnanʿīr) is a village located in the Keserwan District of the Keserwan-Jbeil Governorate in Lebanon.

In 1996 Fuad Hamdan, Greenpeace’s Mediterranean spokesperson, claimed there was a toxic waste dump in Chnaniir. The waste was part of an estimated 10,000 barrels shipped from Italy in the late 1980s and dumped in various sites in Lebanon, inland and along the coast. It included Cadmium and other heavy metals, Organophospate pesticides and Chlorines. The site in Chnaniir was allegedly concealed by a cow shed.
