= Qleiat =

Qleiat قليعات
- Village
- Location within Lebanon
- Coordinates: 33.972435°N 35.714025°E
- Country: Lebanon
- Governorate: Keserwan-Jbeil
- District: Keserwan

Area
  - Total: 6.46 km^{2} (2.49 sq mi)
- Elevation: 1,050 m (3,440 ft)
- Time zone: UTC+2 (EET)
  - Summer (DST): UTC+3 (EEST)
- Dialing code: +961

Qleiat (Arabic: قليعات; also spelled Qulaya'at, Qlaiaat, Qliyat, Qleiaat, Qleiat or Kleiat) is a town and municipality in the Keserwan District of the Keserwan-Jbeil Governorate of Lebanon. It is located 28 kilometers north of Beirut. Qleiat's average elevation is 1,050 meters above sea level and its total land area is 646 hectares. Its inhabitants are predominantly Maronite Catholic, with Christians from other denominations in the minority.

The 17th-century Convent of the Sfeir (couvent des Sfeir). founded by chevalier Nader Sfeir is located in Kleiat.
