= Jouret (surname) =

Jouret is a French language surname. Notable people with the surname include:

- Luc Jouret (1947–1994), Belgian cult leader
- Plastic Bertrand (born Roger Allen François Jouret in 1954), Belgian musician, songwriter, producer, editor and television presenter
