= Ballouneh =

Ballouneh بلونة
- Municipality
- Location in Lebanon
- Coordinates: 33°56′58″N 35°40′29″E
- Country: Lebanon
- Governorate: Keserwan-Jbeil
- District: Keserwan

Area
  - Total: 3.93 km^{2} (1.52 sq mi)
- Elevation: 650 m (2,130 ft)
- Time zone: UTC+2 (EET)
  - Summer (DST): UTC+3 (EEST)

Ballouneh (Levantine Arabic: بلونة, romanized: Ballūneh) is a town and municipality in the Keserwan District of the Keserwan-Jbeil Governorate of Lebanon. It is located 18 kilometers north of Beirut. It has an approximate area of 3.93 square kilometers and an average elevation of 650 meters above sea level. Ballouneh's inhabitants are predominantly Maronite Catholics, although Christians from other denominations also live in the town.

== Etymology ==
There are two versions regarding the origin of the word Ballouneh, either deriving from the Syriac word ballani/ballana meaning bath or pertaining to the Greek name of the god Apollo.

== Notable sites ==
- The old Roman well (near the municipality's building)
- The house of Sheikh Abou Nader el Khazen
- The church of St. Mary (dating back to the sixteenth century)

== See also ==
Fakhr-al-Din II
