= Chahtoul-Jouret Mhad =

Municipality in Keserwan-Jbeil, Lebanon

Chahtoul-Jouret Mhad جورة مهاد-شحتول
- Municipality
- Location within Lebanon
- Coordinates: 34°1′57″N 35°43′14″E
- Country: Lebanon
- Governorate: Keserwan-Jbeil
- District: Keserwan

Area
  - Total: 2.9 km^{2} (1.1 sq mi)
- Elevation: 920 m (3,020 ft)
- Time zone: UTC+2 (EET)
  - Summer (DST): UTC+3 (EEST)
- Dialing code: +961

Chahtoul-Jouret Mhad (Arabic: جورة مهاد-شحتول, romanized: Jūret Mhād-Shaḥtūl; also spelled Shahtoul or Shahtul) is a municipality in the Keserwan District of the Keserwan-Jbeil Governorate, Lebanon. It consists of the village of Chahtoul, 32 kilometers north of Beirut. Its average elevation is 920 meters above sea level and its total land area is 290 hectares.

Its inhabitants are predominantly Maronite Catholics.

Chahtoul is the hometown of the Lebanese writer May Ziadeh. A statue of her is in the village.
