= Daraya, Keserwan =

Daraya داريا
- Municipality
- Location in Lebanon
- Coordinates: 33°57′19″N 35°41′55″E
- Country: Lebanon
- Governorate: Keserwan-Jbeil
- District: Keserwan

Area
  - Total: 0.91 km^{2} (0.35 sq mi)
- Elevation: 690 m (2,260 ft)
- Time zone: UTC+2 (EET)
  - Summer (DST): UTC+3 (EEST)

Daraya (Arabic: داريا, romanized: Dārayyā; also spelled Daraiya or Darayya) is a town and municipality located in the Keserwan District of the Keserwan-Jbeil Governorate of Lebanon. The town is about 21 kilometres (13 mi) north of Beirut. It has an average elevation of 690 meters above sea level and a total land area of 91 hectares. Daraya's inhabitants are Maronites.
