= Aintoura =

Aintoura عينطورا ܥܝܢܛܘܪܐ
- Municipality
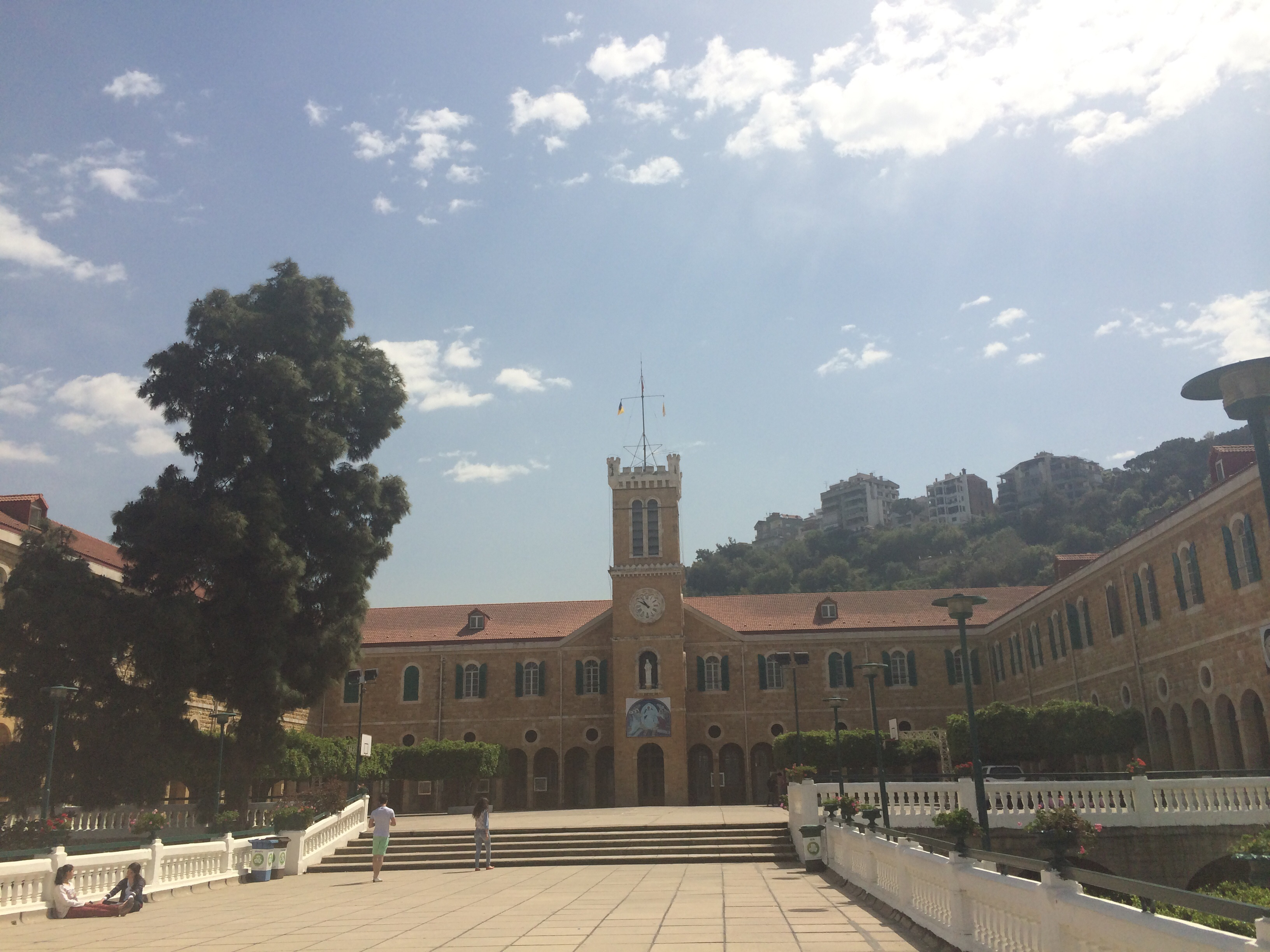
- Collège Saint Joseph in Aintoura

- Location in Lebanon
- Coordinates: 33°57′0″N 35°38′0″E
- Country: Lebanon
- Governorate: Mount Lebanon
- District: Keserwan

Area
  - Total: 0.71 km^{2} (0.27 sq mi)
- Elevation: 230 m (750 ft)
- Time zone: UTC+2 (EET)
  - Summer (DST): +3

Aintoura (Arabic: عينطورا, romanized: ʿAynṭūrā; Syriac: ܥܝܢܛܘܪܐ) is a town and municipality in the Keserwan District of the Keserwan-Jbeil Governorate, Lebanon. It is located 18 kilometers east of Beirut. The average elevation of Aintoura is 230 meters above the sea level and its total land area is 71 hectares. Its inhabitants are predominantly Maronite Christians.

== History ==
Aintoura, which means "the water spring of the mountain" (ܥܝܢܛܘܪܐ) in Syriac, is a very old village inhabited, as tools found in two of its historic grottos witness, since the Stone Age. More recent history shows that Aintoura has been inhabited between 1307 and 1515, and since 1657 when people started living there on a continuous basis.

Main Religious Centers of Attraction: The Convent of the Visitation: Founded in 1746, it was a convent for nuns, which was instituted in 1862, and was the first school for girls in the entire region. May Ziadeh, a well-known scholar, graduated from this school. The Cemetery of Armenian Orphans: This cemetery, hosted within the walls of Saint- Joseph College in Antoura, is the resting home for more than three hundred Armenian children who had died from typhus during World War I, after having been lodged in the college. At the time, Lebanon was an integral part of the Ottoman Empire, and Saint Joseph College had been morphed into an orphanage, its church into a first aid center, and its tower into a minaret. Also, the Turks had proceeded to changing the names of those orphans into Arabic names, while making them follow Islam.

== Geography ==
Aintoura is located 21 km east of Beirut (Capital of Lebanon), in the heart of Mount Lebanon. From an elevation of 250m, it overlooks green, pine covered valleys on one side, and the Mediterranean Sea on the other. Aintoura spreads over 760.000 square meters, is home to 3200 inhabitants, and enjoys a very mild climate.

== Education ==
The village of Aintoura is known for hosting the first school in the Middle East, Collège Saint Joseph of Aintoura, founded in 1653. For uncountable years, it has hosted sons of legions of notables from all over the region: Iran, Egypt, Cyprus, Syria and Turkey. Christians, Muslims, and Jews, sons of political foes, all grew side by side, became friends, shared the same values, thanks to an education that gave proper respect to ethical and moral values, while respecting personal differences. The teachings have had a lasting effect on the political developments in the region. Several public figures had studied in Collège Saint Joseph of Aintoura, namely three former Lebanese Presidents, Suleiman Frangieh, Rene Mouawad, and Elias Sarkis, May Ziadeh, Kamal Jumblatt, Ghassan Tueni, Maurice Gemayel, and many others... Aintoura, as a village, has, therefore, a proper higher learning institution, not a simple village school. This institution has been rearing, every year, around 3800 students from several neighboring areas.

The Lebanese Canadian University, LCU, founded in 2000, has been graduating around 1500 students every year with degrees in business, Sciences, Arts, and Humanities in partnership with internationally renowned universities such as l'Université Montesquieu Bordeaux IV, Grenoble École de Management, IPAC France & Switzerland, Université du Quebec in Montreal, and Université de Sherbrooke in Canada.
