= Hrajel =

Hrajel حراجل
- Municipality
- Location in Lebanon
- Coordinates: 34°0′54″N 35°47′41″E
- Country: Lebanon
- Governorate: Keserwan-Jbeil
- District: Keserwan

Area
  - Total: 12.30 km^{2} (4.75 sq mi)
- Elevation: 1,320 m (4,330 ft)
- Time zone: UTC+2 (EET)
  - Summer (DST): UTC+3 (EEST)

Hrajel (Arabic: حراجل, romanized: Ḥrājel) is a town and municipality located in the Keserwan District of the Keserwan-Jbeil Governorate of Lebanon. The town is about 42 kilometres (26 mi) north of Beirut. It has an average elevation of 1,320 meters above sea level and a total land area of 1,230 hectares. Hrajel's inhabitants are Maronites.

A hidden grotto can be found in Hrajel next to a river that feeds Nahr el Kalb. The grotto is rumored to be a far upward extension of the Jeita grotto but it is currently closed to the public.

== Bibliography ==
- Bakhit, Muhammad Adnan Salamah (February 1972). The Ottoman Province of Damascus in the Sixteenth Century (PhD). School of Oriental and African Studies, University of London.
