= Fatqa =

Fatqa فتقا
- Village
- Location in Lebanon
- Coordinates: 34°2′4″N 35°40′2″E
- Country: Lebanon
- Governorate: Keserwan-Jbeil
- District: Keserwan
- Elevation: 1,710 ft (520 m)
- Time zone: UTC+2 (EET)
  - Summer (DST): +3

Fatqa (Arabic: فتقا, romanized: Fatqā) is a village located in the Keserwan District of the Keserwan-Jbeil Governorate in Lebanon.
