= Tabarja =

Tabarja طبرجا
- Village
- Location within Lebanon
- Coordinates: 34°02′N 35°38′E
- Country: Lebanon
- Governorate: Keserwan-Jbeil
- District: Keserwan District
- Time zone: UTC+2 (EET)
  - Summer (DST): UTC+3 (EEST)
- Dialing code: +961

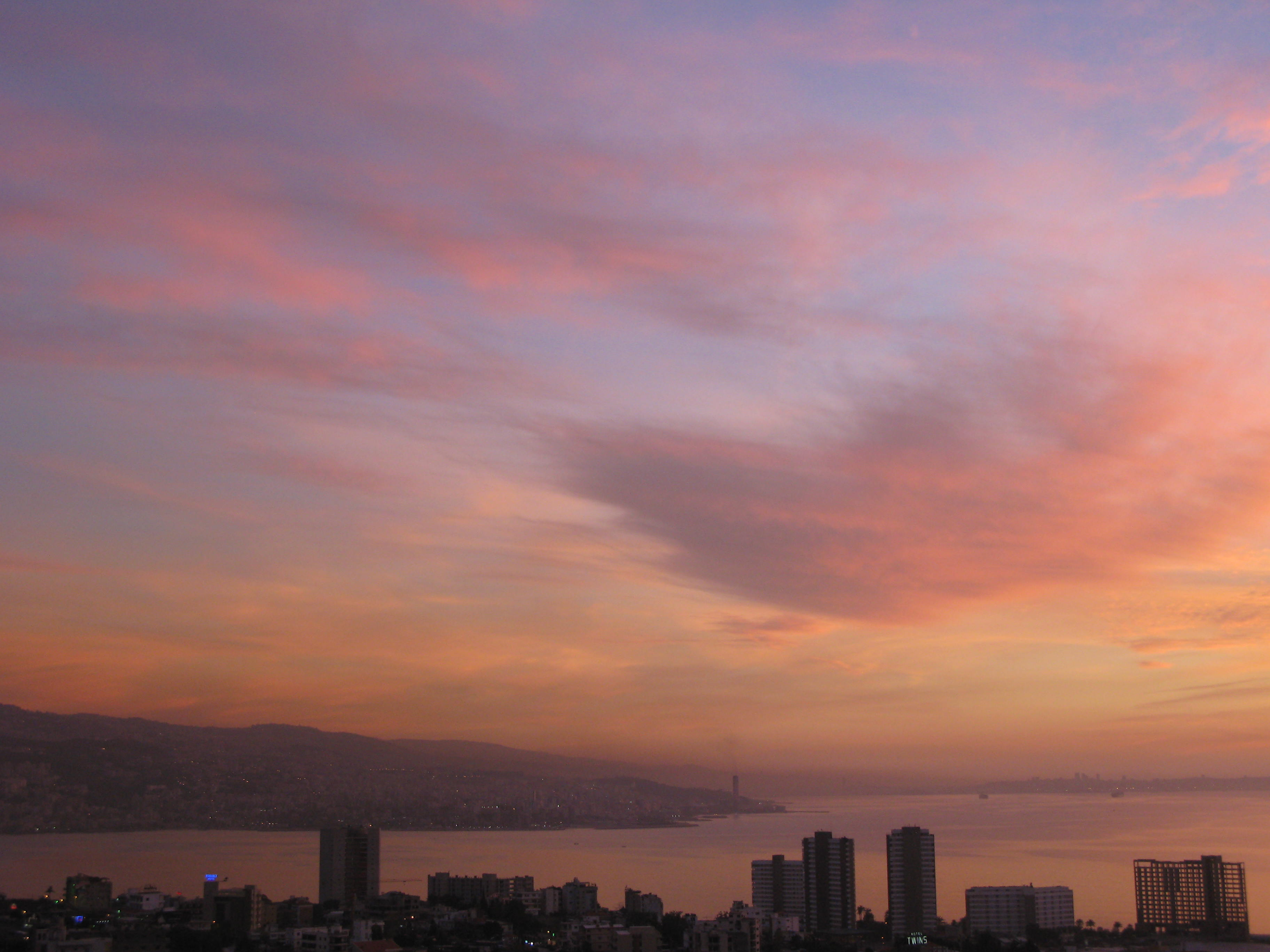
A sunset in Tabarja

Tabarja (Arabic: طبرجا, romanized: Ṭabarjā) is an ancient coastal village in Lebanon, situated in Kesrouan, 26 km (16 mi)

== Etymology ==
Tabarja has been known by various names throughout its history.

It is identified with the coastal town of Trieres in Polybius' Histories. The historian places the Lycus river, Calamus, and Trieres between Beirut and Batrun. In the 6th-century AD pilgrimage guide Antonini Placentini Itinerarium, Trieri (Trierim civitatem) is mentioned and placed between Beirut and Byblos. Trieres was a Greek exonym meaning "trireme" which implies the location of the settlement next to a harbor.

According to Lipiński, the name Tabarja (Tabarga) stems from Tiberias through an Arabic dialectal change of -iyya in "Tabariyya" into "Tabarigg", or a Frankish process of palatalization to "Tabarge". (Note: Sayda (Sidon) became Sagette.) The settlement was so-called after emperor Tiberius, like the town built in the first century AD on the western shore of the Sea of Galilee. This is corroborated by 13th-century AD Arab geographer Yaqut al-Hamawi, who lists a Tabarayya in as-Sham besides the one in Palestine. As for the Semitic root of the Greek exonym Trieres, Lipiński suggests "traʿ- ʾarʿā" which means in Aramaic "the gate of the country"; a hypothesis that is corroborated by the Latin name of "Passus Pagani" (the Pass of the Countrymen" mentioned by William, a 12th-century chronicler and archbishop of Tyre.

The Aramaic name dates to the Persian period, when it indicated the geographical frontier between the lands of the kingdoms of Sidon and Byblos.

== Local lore ==
Local tradition reports that a rich king called Bargis lived in this town in the ancient times. This story could date to when Tabarja was still "Tiberias" (see Etymology).

== Modern History ==
On 18 December 1996 a minibus carrying Syrian workers was ambushed by gunmen in Tabarja. The driver was killed and seven passengers wounded. At the time it was estimated there were around one million Syrian workers in Lebanon.
