= Jouret el-Termos =

Jouret el-Termos جورة الترمس
- Municipality
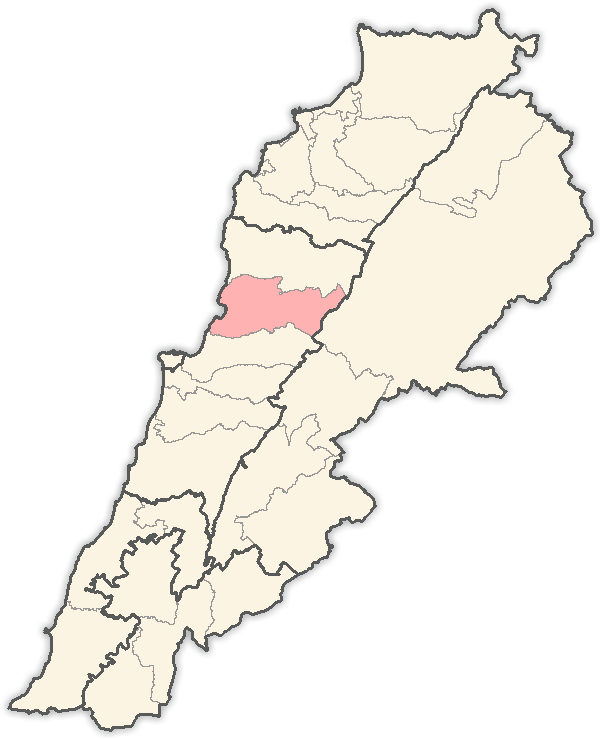
- Keserwan District, Lebanon.

- Location in Lebanon
- Coordinates: 34°2′41″N 35°43′12″E
- Country: Lebanon
- Governorate: Keserwan-Jbeil
- District: Keserwan

Area
  - Total: 3.2 km^{2} (1.22 sq mi)
- Elevation: 1,010 m (3,310 ft)
- Time zone: UTC+2 (EET)
  - Summer (DST): UTC+3 (EEST)

Jouret el-Termos (Arabic: جورة الترمس, romanized: Jūrat at-Turmus, locally Jūret et-Termos; also spelled Jurat et-Tourmous) is a village and municipality located in the Keserwan District of the Keserwan-Jbeil Governorate in Lebanon. The village is 37 kilometres (23 mi) north of Beirut. It has an average elevation of 1,010 meters above sea level (ranging from 750 to 1,100 m) and a total land area of 122 hectares. Jouret el-Termos's inhabitants are Maronites.
