= Daraoun =

Daraoun درعون
- Village
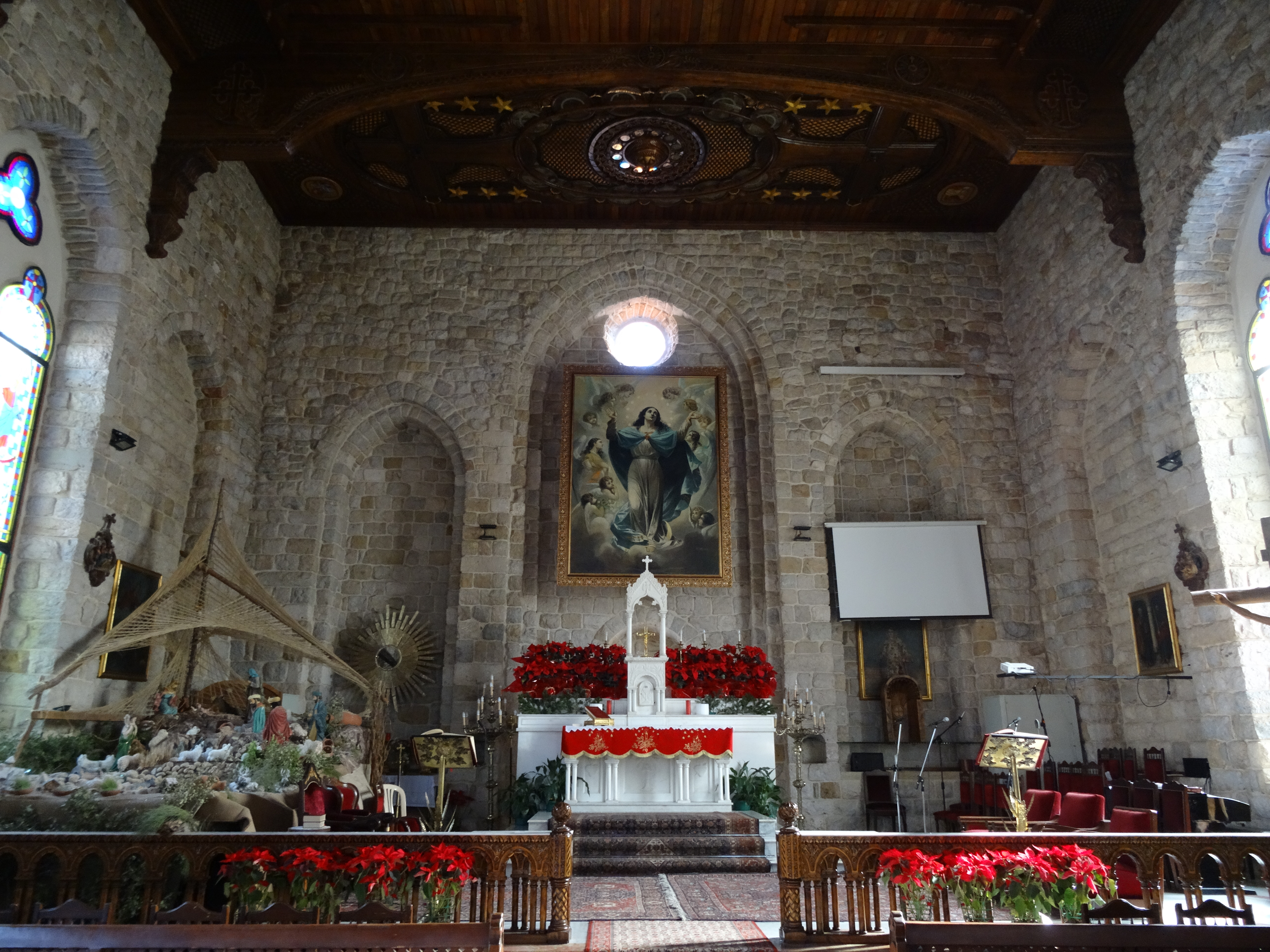
- Maronite Church Notre-Dame-de-l'Assomption

- Location in Lebanon
- Coordinates: 33°58′37″N 35°39′31″E
- Country: Lebanon
- Governorate: Keserwan-Jbeil
- District: Keserwan
- Time zone: UTC+2 (EET)
  - Summer (DST): +3

Daraoun (Arabic: درعون, romanized: Darʿūn) is a village, part of Harissa-Daraoun municipality, located in the Keserwan District of the Keserwan-Jbeil Governorate in Lebanon.

== History ==
Ottoman tax records indicate Daraoun had seven Christian households and three Christian bachelors in 1523, sixteen Muslim households and one imam in 1530, and ten Christian households and three Christian bachelors in 1543. Sons or descendants of Abu Nawfal, the 17th-century head of the Khazen family, settled to some extent in Daraoun.

In 1838, Eli Smith noted Der'an as a village located in "Aklim el-Kesrawan, Northeast of Beirut; the chief seat of the Maronites".

== Bibliography ==
- Bakhit, Muhammad Adnan Salamah (February 1972). The Ottoman Province of Damascus in the Sixteenth Century (PhD). School of Oriental and African Studies, University of London.
- van Leeuwen, Richard (1994). Notables and Clergy in Mount Lebanon: The Khāzin Sheikhs and the Maronite Church, 1736–1840. Leiden, New York and Koln: Brill. ISBN 90-04-09978-6.
- Robinson, E.; Smith, E. (1841). Biblical Researches in Palestine, Mount Sinai and Arabia Petraea: A Journal of Travels in the year 1838. Vol. 3. Boston: Crocker & Brewster.
