= Keserwan District =

Coordinates: 33°58′11″N 35°36′56″E

Keserwan District قضاء كسروان
- District
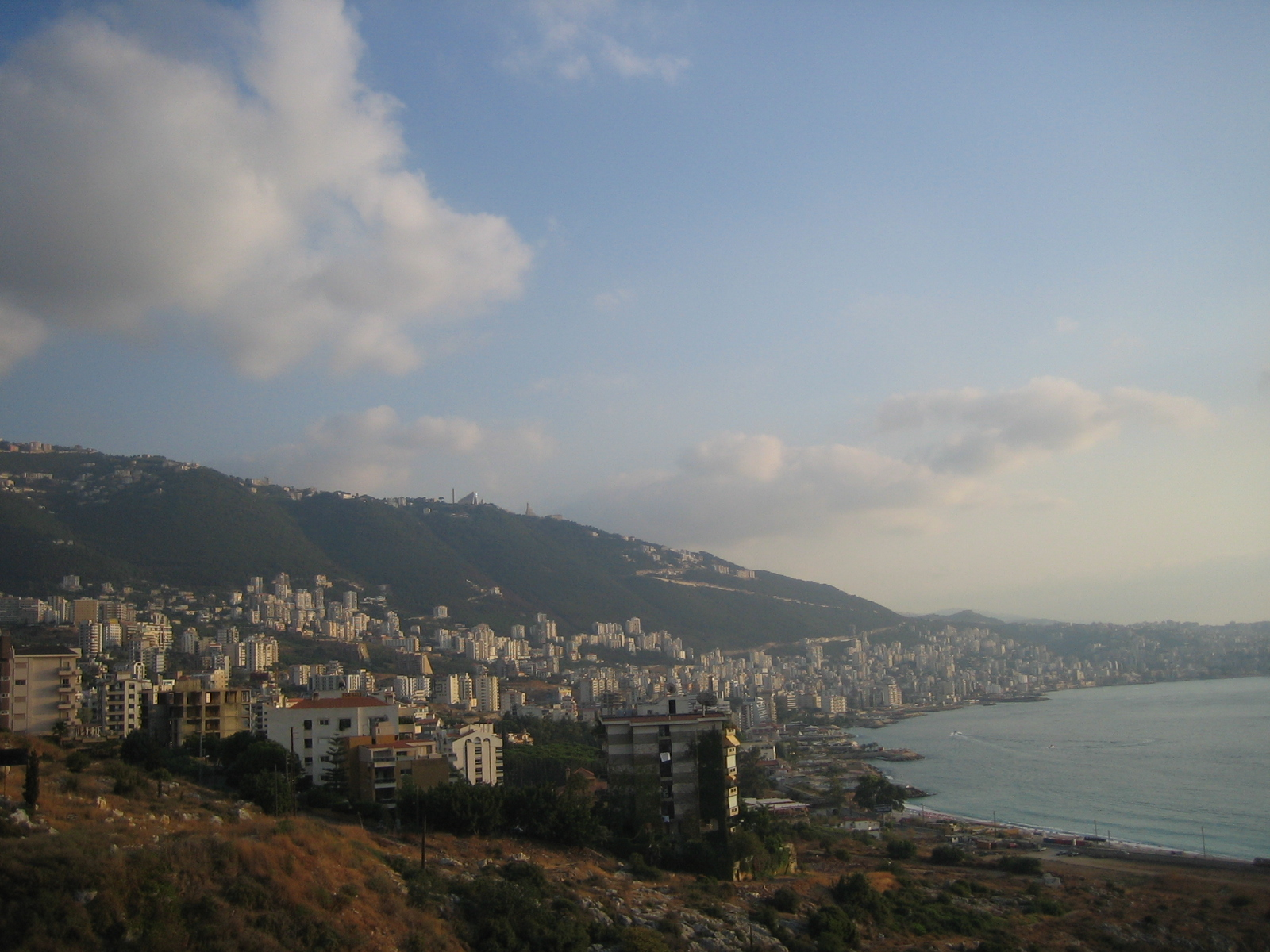
- Jounieh Bay
- Motto: "The Christians' Castle"
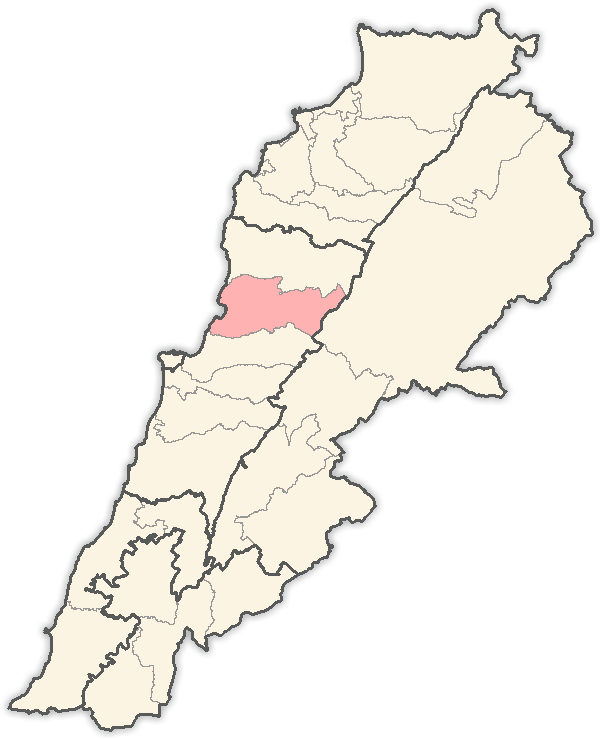
- Location in Lebanon
- Country: Lebanon
- Governorate: Keserwan-Jbeil
- Capital: Jounieh

Area
  - Total: 336 km^{2} (130 sq mi)

Population
  - Estimate (31 December 2017): 182,834
  - Density: 544/km^{2} (1,410/sq mi)
- Time zone: UTC+2 (EET)
  - Summer (DST): UTC+3 (EEST)

Keserwan District (Arabic: قضاء كسروان, transliteration: Qaḍā' Kisrawān) is a district (qadaa) in Keserwan-Jbeil Governorate, Lebanon, to the northeast of Lebanon's capital Beirut. The capital, Jounieh, is overwhelmingly Christian, mostly consisting of Maronites. The area is home to the Jabal Moussa Biosphere Reserve.

== Etymology ==
According to the medieval historian Gabriel ibn al-Qilai, the name “Kesrwan” derives from the Maronite muqadam Kisra of Baskinta. During the time of the Crusades, Keserwan was the northern frontier of the Kingdom of Jerusalem.

== Demographics ==
According to registered voters in 2014:

Year	Christians						Muslims			Druze
Year	Total	Maronites	Greek Catholics	Greek Orthodox	Armenian Orthodox	Other Christians	Total	Shias	Sunnis	Druze
2014	96.96%	82.80%	5.06%	3.73%	1.74%	3.63%	2.36%	1.78%	0.58%	0.03%
2018	97.53%	82.70%	5.08%	3.79%	1.69%	4.27%	2.42%	1.83%	0.59%	0.03%
2022	98.13%	84.37%	5.17%	3.85%	1.47%	3.27%	1.86%	1.69%	0.17%	0.00%
2026	98.11%	90.64%	2.22%	0.93%	1.49%	2.83%	1.89%	1.89%	0.00%	0.00%

Number of registered voters (21+ years old) over the years.

Years	Women	Men	Total	Growth (%)
2009	45,778	43,449	89,227	—N/a
2010	46,028 ▲	43,697 ▲	89,725 ▲	+0.55% ▲
2011	45,612 ▼	43,616 ▼	89,228 ▼	-0.56% ▼
2012	45,887 ▲	43,774 ▲	89,661 ▲	+0.48% ▲
2013	46,428 ▲	44,147 ▲	90,575 ▲	+1.01% ▲
2014	46,804 ▲	44,531 ▲	91,335 ▲	+0.83% ▼
2015	47,162 ▲	44,831 ▲	91,993 ▲	+0.72% ▼
2016	47,503 ▲	45,362 ▲	92,865 ▲	+0.94% ▲
2017	47,906 ▲	45,634 ▲	93,540 ▲	+0.72% ▼
2018	48,335 ▲	45,875 ▲	94,210 ▲	+0.71% ▼
2019	48,700 ▲	46,167 ▲	94,867 ▲	+0.69% ▼
2020	49,086 ▲	46,560 ▲	95,646 ▲	+0.81% ▲
2021	49,231 ▲	46,709 ▲	95,940 ▲	+0.31% ▼
2022	49,481 ▲	46,938 ▲	96,419 ▲	+0.50% ▲
2023	49,509 ▲	46,831 ▼	96,340 ▼	-0.08% ▼
2024	49,670 ▲	46,902 ▲	96,572 ▲	+0.24% ▲
2025	49,817 ▲	47,075 ▲	96,892 ▲	+0.33% ▲
2026	—N/a	—N/a	97,292 ▲	+0.41% ▲
Source: DGCS

=== Electoral constituency ===
The district is part of the Keserwan-Byblos electoral district, with the district of Keserwan being allocated 5 Maronite seats (and the overall constituency having 7 Maronites and 1 Shi'ia).

== Cities, towns, and villages ==
- Aazra
- Adma
- Adonis
- Ain-bzil
- Ain El Delbeh
- Ain el-Rihaneh
- Aintoura
- Ajaltoun
- Akaybeh
- Aramoun
- Ashqout
- Attine
- Azra & Ozor
- Ballouneh
- Batha
- Bekaata Ashqout
- Bekaata Kenaan
- Bezhel
- Bezhel & Mradyeh
- Bkerké
- Bouar
- Bqaatouta (Bkaatouta)
- Bzoummar
- Chahtoul
- Chnaniir
- Dafne
- Daher Sarba
- Daraoun
- Daraya
- Dlebta
- Faitroun
- Faqra
- Faraya
- Fatqa
- Ghadir
- Ghbaleh
- Ghidras
- Ghineh
- Ghosta
- Harissa
- Harharaya
- Hiyata
- Hosein
- Hrajel
- Jdaidet Ghazir
- Jeita
- Jounieh
- Jouret Bedran
- Jouret Mhad
- Jouret el-Termos
- Jwar El Hous
- Kaslik
- Kattine
- Kfardebian
- Kfaryassine
- Kfour
- Kleiat
- Maarab
- Maaysra
- Mayrouba
- Nammoura
- Okaibe
- Raachine
- Rayfoun
- Safra
- Sahel Alma
- Sarba
- Sehaileh
- Tabarja
- Wata El Jawz
- Yahchouch
- Zaaytre
- Zeytoun
- Zouk Mikael
- Zouk Mosbeh

== Notable families ==
- Assaf dynasty Sultan Selim I assigned the Assafs as his chief agents in the region between Beirut and Tripoli, confirming their control of Keserwan, and awarding them tax farms in the nawahi of Byblos and Beirut. While Emir Assaf had lived in Aintoura in the winter and elsewhere along the Nahr al-Kalb ridge prior to the Ottoman conquest, in 1517, he moved his headquarters to Ghazir.
- Khazen family
- Sfeir The clan legend is that a Crusader King, most likely Godfrey of Bouillon, granted to the Sfeir clan a portion of what is today the Keserwan District of Mount Lebanon, which was the northern frontier of the Kingdom of Jerusalem, as a reward for their loyalty to his reign and bravery in battle.

== Gallery ==
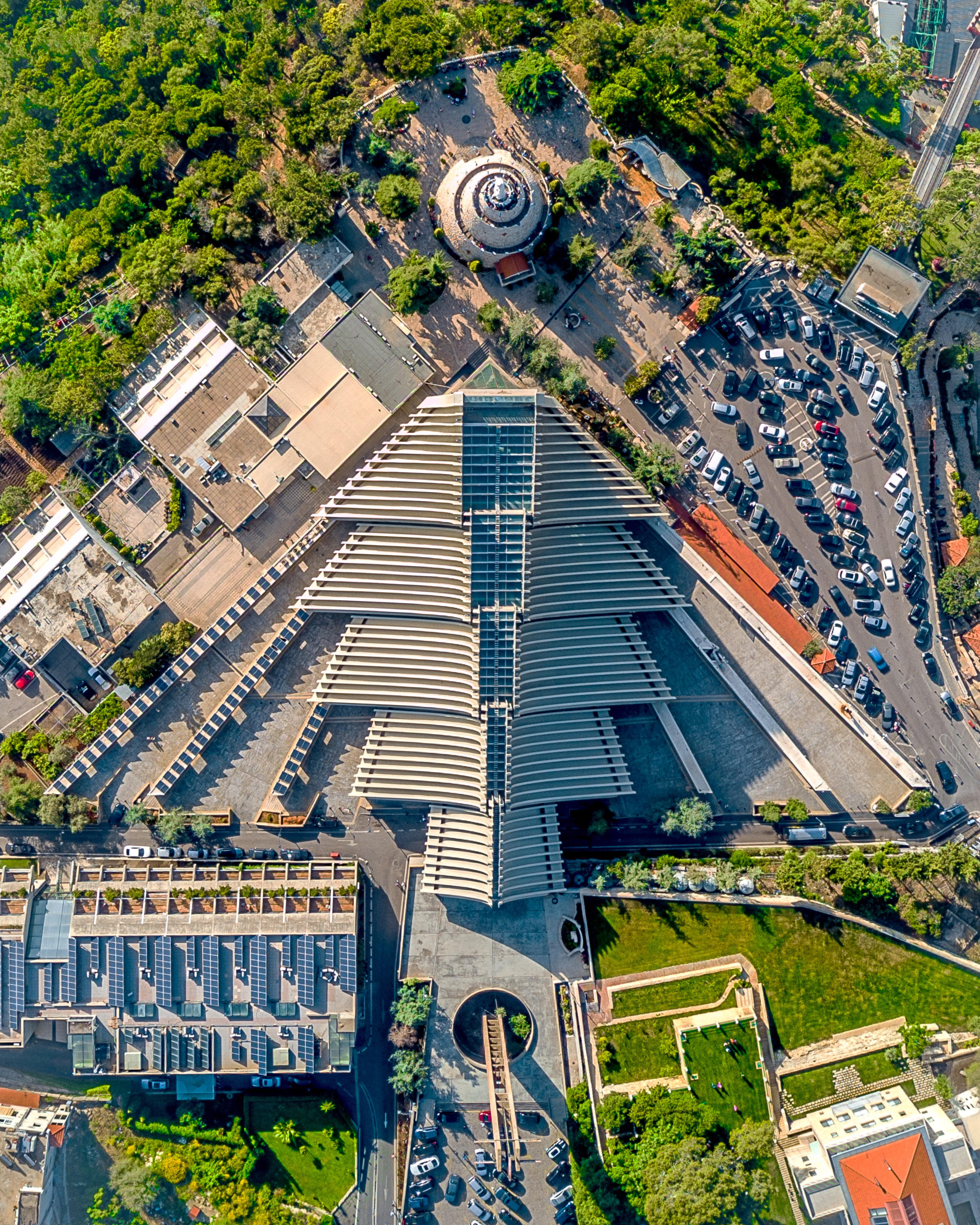
Our Lady of Lebanon church, Keserwan District

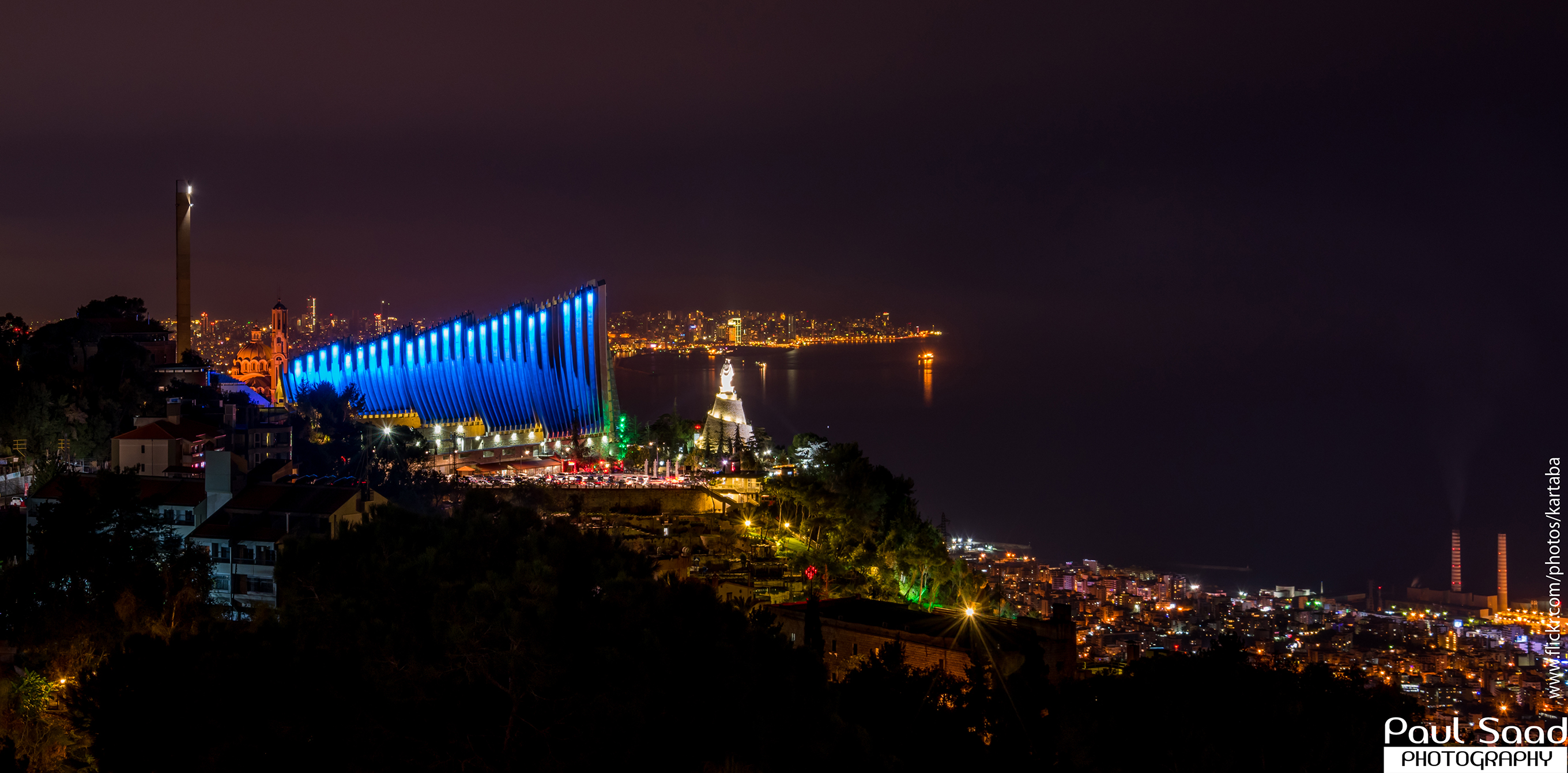
Cathedral of Our Lady of Lebanon, Harissa

== See also ==
- Assaf dynasty
- Kisrawan
- Mount Lebanon revolts of 752 and 759

== Bibliography ==
- Crawford, Robert (April 1955). "William of Tyre and the Maronites". Speculum. 30 (2). The University of Chicago Press: 222–228. JSTOR 28448470.
- Fahd, Butros (1974). Arciescovo Pietro Sfair grande orientalista e predicatore, vita e opere [Archbishop Pietro Sfair great orientalist and preacher, life and work] (in Italian). Rome: Matabi al-Karim al-Hadithath. Archived from the original on 18 January 2025.
- Antoine Khoury Harb, The Maronites: History and Constants (ASIN B000B0F6NU)
- Matti Moosa, The Maronites in History (ISBN 1-59333-182-7)
- Richard Van Leeuwen, Notables and Clergy in Mount Lebanon: The Khāzin Sheikhs and the Maronite Church (1736-1840) (ISBN 90-04-09978-6)
- Farid el-Khazen, The Breakdown of the State in Lebanon, 1967-1976 (ISBN 0-674-08105-6)
- Harris, William (2012). Lebanon: A History, 600-2011. Oxford University Press. ISBN 978-0-19-518111-1.
- Salibi, Kamal (September 1957). "The Maronites of Lebanon under Frankish and Mamluk Rule (1099-1516)". Arabica. 4 (3). Brill: 288–303. doi:10.1163/157005857X00057. JSTOR 4055054.
- Salibi, Kamal S. (1959). Maronite Historians of Medieval Lebanon. Beirut: American University of Beirut.
- Salibi, Kamal (June 1967). "Northern Lebanon under the Dominance of Ġazīr (1517–1591)". Arabica. 14 (2): 144–166. doi:10.1163/157005867X00029. JSTOR 4055631.
- Salibi, Kamal S. (1988). A House of Many Mansions: The History of Lebanon Reconsidered. University of California Press. ISBN 9780520071964.
- Catholic-Hierarchy
- The sword of the Maronite Prince
- Origins of the "Prince of Maronite" Title
- National Geographic Magazine DNA sample from Khazen member
- An Interview with Cheikh Malek el-Khazen
