= Nahr al-Kalb =

River in Lebanon

Coordinates: 33°57′N 35°36′E

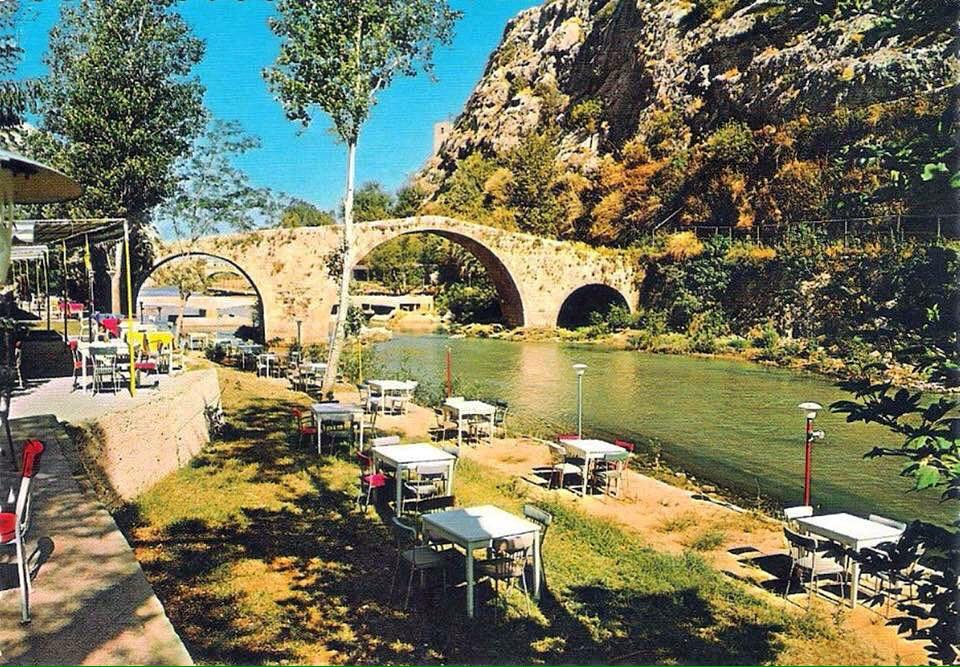
Nahr El-Kalb in 1965

The Nahr al-Kalb (Arabic: نهر الكلب, meaning Dog River) is a river in Lebanon that runs for 31 km (19 mi) from a spring in Jeita near the Jeita Grotto to the Mediterranean Sea. The river was historically used as a natural border. It is the site of the Stelae of Nahr el-Kalb.

== Historical significance ==
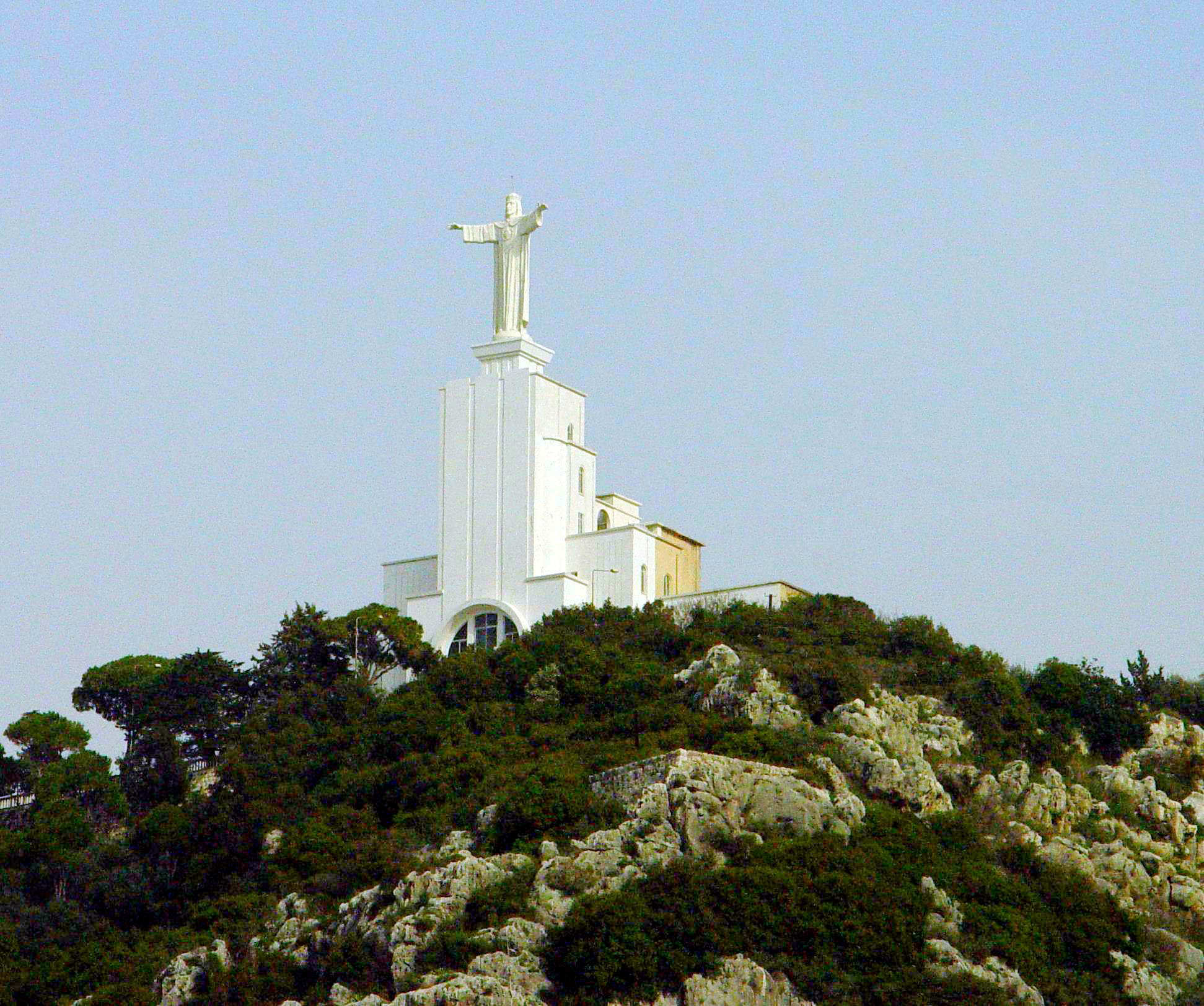
Christ the King statue overlooking the river basin

The Nahr al-Kalb is the ancient Lycus River. The river mouth is renowned for its Commemorative stelae of Nahr el-Kalb, featuring inscriptions from various civilizations. Past generals and conquerors have traditionally built monuments at the mouth of the Nahr al-Kalb, known as the Commemorative stelae of Nahr el-Kalb. The notable inscriptions are of: Assyrian, Babylonian, Roman, Crusader, Ottoman, and modern era.

The entire site of the Nahr el-Kelb valley with the archaeological sites it conceals is classified on the indicative list of UNESCO world heritage.

The Battle of the Dog River was fought between Baldwin I of Jerusalem and Seljuk forces at the river in 1100.

The Nahr al-Kalb served as a natural border. By 1516, the river served as the border between two provinces of the Mamluk Sultanate, Tripoli and Damascus. Fakhr al-Din II expanded his territory north to the Nahr al-Kalb in 1598, and expanded past the river in 1605.

== Geography ==
Kisrawan borders the Nahr al-Kalb.

== Recent developments ==
As of February 2025, the site remains a focus of historical research and preservation. In November 2023, digital documentation of the cuneiform inscriptions was carried out to support their preservation and study.

== Works cited ==
=== Books ===
- Buck, Andrew; Smith, Thomas, eds. (2019). Remembering the Crusades in Medieval Texts and Songs. University of Wales Press. ISBN 9781786835048.
- Heyberger, Bernard (2013). Hindiyya, Mystic and Criminal, 1720-1798: A Political and Religious Crisis in Lebanon. The Lutterworth Press. ISBN 9780227173886.

=== Journals ===
- Salibi, Kamal (1967). "Northern Lebanon under the dominance of Ġazīr (1517-1591)". Arabica. Brill Publishers: 144–166. doi:10.2307/4055631. JSTOR 4055631.
- Salibi, Kamal (1973). "The Sayfās and the eyalet of Tripoli 1579-1640". Arabica. Brill Publishers: 25–52. doi:10.2307/4056003. JSTOR 4056003.
