= Ghbaleh =

Ghbaleh غبالة
- Municipality
- Location in Lebanon
- Coordinates: 34°3′17″N 35°43′20″E
- Country: Lebanon
- Governorate: Keserwan-Jbeil
- District: Keserwan

Area
  - Total: 2.71 km^{2} (1.05 sq mi)
- Highest elevation: 1,100 m (3,600 ft)
- Lowest elevation: 700 m (2,300 ft)
- Time zone: UTC+2 (EET)
  - Summer (DST): UTC+3 (EEST)
- Dialing code: +961

Ghbaleh (Levantine Arabic: غبالة, romanized: Ghbaleh, also spelled Ghebaleh) is a village and municipality in the Keserwan District of the Keserwan-Jbeil Governorate in central Lebanon. It is located 42 kilometers northeast of Beirut. Its average elevation is 890 meters above sea level and its total land area consists of 271 hectares. The village is bordered by the villages of Ghineh, Jouret El Termos, Azra, Jouret Bedran and Nahr El Dahab.

== History ==
Historically, it is believed that Phoenicians inhabited the region since remains are found in nearby Ghineh, where historians believe is the resting place of the historical figure Adonis. The region was later occupied by Maronite communities who experienced a degree of independence during the rule of the Crusaders, and this, until its destruction at the hands of the Mamluks in 1307. The region was abandoned for the next three centuries until Christian families arrived somewhere during the 17th century. Until 1863, Ghbaleh was considered the capital of the Ftouh Keserwan region and encompassed all neighbouring villages under the name "Ghbaleh and its farms".

== Families ==
Ghbaleh's main families are Khairallah, Bou Assaf, Lteif, Ephram, Boustany, Zouain, Al Hossry, Bassil, Haddad, Tayeh, Fahed, Assaf, Awad, Atallah, Said, Ghanem, Khoury, Korkmaz, Karam, Beaino, Chelela, Hallany, Dahdah, Abi Khalil, Chamy, Ziade, Abi Zeid, Saade, Fikany, Khouwairy, Najmeh and Khalil.

The Ghanem family is descended from Moussa Ghanem Al-Ghassani, a descendant of the Ghassanids, who were a Christian dynasty in the Levant under the aegis of the Byzantine Empire. Moussa came to Yanouh in the 9th century and settled there. Later, in 1121, some of his descendants moved to Lehfed. Finally, Sarkis Ghanem moved from Lehfed to Ftouh Keserwan during the 17th century and settled there.

== Feasts and festivals ==
On September 13 of each year, Ghbaleh hosts the "Eid Al Saleeb" festival (Feast of the Cross), which includes a carnival, as well as musical and religious events. Attendees come from all over Lebanon, in addition to locals living abroad.

== Administration and demography ==
Ghbaleh has a population of about 3500 inhabitants. These included 1,452 registered voters in 2010. Its inhabitants are predominantly Maronite Christians. Antoine Hossri is the mayor of Ghbaleh since 2025.

== Places of worship ==
Ghbaleh's 17th-century Saints Sergius and Bacchus Church is one of the oldest religious monuments in the region, in addition to the Saint George Church at Hakl al Rayes, the Saint Challita Church, the Saint Anthony Church, the Saint Nohra Church, the Church of Our Lady of Shekiff and the Immaculate Conception Church.

== Etymology ==
Ghbaleh name is derived from Syriac and means the mount of mud, referencing the mud used there in the pottery industry..
