= Azra wa el-Azr =

Azra wa el-Azr العذرا والعذر
- Municipality
- Location in Lebanon
- Coordinates: 34°3′44″N 35°42′17″E
- Country: Lebanon
- Governorate: Keserwan-Jbeil
- District: Keserwan

Area
  - Total: 1.13 km^{2} (0.44 sq mi)
- Elevation: 750 m (2,460 ft)
- Time zone: UTC+2 (EET)
  - Summer (DST): UTC+3 (EEST)

Azra wa el-Azr (Arabic: العذرا والعذر, romanized: al-ʿAzrā wa al-ʿAzr; also spelled Aazra ou el Aazr or simply Azra) is a municipality located in the Keserwan District of the Keserwan-Jbeil Governorate in Lebanon. It is bordered by the villages of Zeaitreh, Zeitoun, Mradiyeh, Jouret Bedran and Ghbaleh.

The municipality, which consists of the villages of Azra and el-Azr, is about 39 kilometres (24 mi) north of Beirut. It has an average elevation of 750 meters above sea level, a total land area of 113 hectares.

== History ==
Historically, it is believed that Phoenicians inhabited the region since remains are found in nearby Ghineh, where historians believe is the resting place of the historical figure Adonis. The region was later inhabited by the Maronites, who experienced a degree of independence under the Crusaders, and this, until its destruction at the hands of the Mamluks in 1305. The region was then abandoned for the next three centuries until Christian families arrived somewhere during the 17th century. Until 1863, Azra was geographically and administratively a part of what was called "Ghbaleh and its farms". In 1863, Azra and Jouret Bedran became a separate entity under the name of "Jouret Bedran and its suburbs", and this, until 1872. In 1872, the inhabitants of Azra, led by Youssef Kamel, then known as Abou Hosn, announced their separation from Jouret Bedran and the installation of their own municipality.

== Activities ==
Each summer, the monastery of the village organizes a four-day fair preceding the feast of Saints Peter and Paul on June 29. In addition, Saint Charbel is celebrated on the third Sunday of July, Saint Elijah on July 20, Saint Stephen on August 2 and Saint Dometius on August 7.

The monastery, which used to serve as a school, also carries out a large number of activities throughout the year, offering mainly Syriac and theology classes, exhibitions, concerts, conferences, prayers and social activities.

In 2025, on the occasion of the feast of Saint Dometius, the town hosted the 10th edition of Souk El Akel, a very popular street food festival in Lebanon.

== Etymology ==
The etymology of the name can be interpreted in several ways. On the one hand, some assume that the village bears the name of the Virgin Mary, "العذراء" (al-ʿAzrāʾ) in Arabic, while others claim that it is named after the turkey oak tree, "العذر" (al-ʿAzr) in Arabic, once abundant in the village and its region. On the other hand, it may be of Aramaic origin, "Ezr" meaning the support, the column, or even a herd of sheep or goats.

== Places of worship ==
The main place of worship in the village is the Saint Stephen Church that serves as the seat of the Azra-Jouret Bedran parish, inaugurated in 1792 in a joint initiative from the Kamel, Korkmaz, Zouain, Imad and Ghanem families of Azra and Jouret Bedran. It is the third church ever built in the region, the first being the Saints Sergius and Bacchus Church built in nearby Ghbaleh in 1780 and the second being the Church of Our Lady also built in Ghbaleh in 1789.

Other places of worship are:

- Monastery of Saints Peter and Paul (built by the Lebanese Maronite Order in 1854)
- Saint Elijah Church (built by Youssef Rouhana Abi Imad in 1861)
- Saint Dometius Church (built by Francis Kamel in 1869)
- Chapel of Our Lady of Lourdes (built by Boutros Imad in 1937)

== Demography ==
The village population consists of around 550 electors. The majority of this population is settled in Jounieh and its suburbs and treat the village as a summer destination to get away from the heat and bustle of the city.
The inhabitants of Azra are mainly followers of the Maronite Church.

== Families ==
The first Christians to arrive to the village after the destruction of Ftouh Keserwan by the Mamluks in 1305 were the predecessors of the Hosri family who came from Hasroun and settled in proximity of the Saints Peter and Paul Monastery. They were followed by the Korkmaz and Imad families who came from Aaqoura in 1636 and the Zouain family in 1664. The Ghanem family came from Lehfed and settled in nearby Jouret Bedran sometime during the 17th century. Lastly, the Kamel family arrived sometime during the 18th century from Aaqoura. The majority of the inhabitants of the village today hold the Kamel surname.

The families of Korkmaz and Imad are descended from Korkmaz II, grandson of Prince Korkmaz I of Aleppo, who is of Albanian descent and died in battle in Alexandria in 1439. His father, Abi Korkmaz II, fled Damascus and settled in Ferzol in 1440, then in Yanouh in 1471, where he was baptized with this family. Korkmaz II then moved to Aaqoura. His sons built the Saint Saba Church. Later, in 1636, the sons of Korkmaz IV, great-great-grandson of Korkmaz II, moved to modern-day Azra, which was then part of Ghbaleh and its farms. They were Semaan Korkmaz, forefather of the Korkmaz family, and Gerges Imad, forefather of the Imad family.

The Ghanem family is descended from Moussa Ghanem, a descendant of the Ghassanids, who were a Christian dynasty in the Levant under the aegis of the Byzantine Empire. Moussa came to Yanouh in the 9th century and settled there. Later, in 1121, some of his descendants moved to Lehfed. According to the priest and historian Youssef Abi Saab (1985), in his book Tārīkh al-Kafūr, Kisrawān wa-Usarihā (“History of the Villages of Keserwan and Their Families”), drawing on Ghanem family correspondence, and providing a detailed account of the migration from Lehfed, one of Moussa Ghanem’s descendants, the muqaddam Ghanem, had three sons and a daughter named Marie, renowned for her beauty. During the Middle Ages, the muqaddam was an elected local leader who served as both commander and representative of his district and played a key role in assisting the Maronite patriarchs in safeguarding the interests of the Maronite community. Upon hearing of her, the Mamluk governor of Tripoli sought her hand in marriage. When her father refused, the governor allegedly came to Lehfed with his soldiers to seize her by force. According to the narrative, Marie’s brother Antonios disguised himself in her clothing and was handed over instead, allowing the rest of the family to flee toward the Nahr Ibrahim area. While en route to Tripoli, Antonios reportedly killed the governor under cover of night and escaped, later rejoining his family. Following this incident, supporters of the governor are said to have burned Lehfed in 1605.
