= Jouret Bedran =

Jouret Bedran جورة بدران
- Municipality
- Location in Lebanon
- Coordinates: 34°3′42″N 35°42′45″E
- Country: Lebanon
- Governorate: Keserwan-Jbeil
- District: Keserwan

Area
  - Total: 3.1 km^{2} (1.2 sq mi)
- Elevation: 1,186 m (3,891 ft)
- Time zone: UTC+2 (EET)
  - Summer (DST): UTC+3 (EEST)

Jouret Bedran (Levantine Arabic: جورة بدران, romanized: Jūret Bedrān; also spelled Jurat Badran) is a village and municipality located in the Keserwan District of the Keserwan-Jbeil Governorate in Lebanon. The village is 50 kilometres (31 mi) north of Beirut. It has an average elevation of 1200 meters above sea level and a total land area of 120 hectares. The village is bordered by the villages of Yahchouch, Ghbaleh, Azra, Mradiyeh and Hakl El Rayes. Jouret Bedran's inhabitants are Maronites.

== History ==
Historically, it is believed that Phoenicians inhabited the region since remains are found in nearby Ghineh, where historians believe is the resting place of the historical figure Adonis. The region was later inhabited by the Maronites, who experienced a degree of independence under the Crusaders, and this, until its destruction at the hands of the Mamluks in 1305. The region was then abandoned for the next three centuries until Christian families arrived somewhere during the 17th century. Until 1863, Jouret Bedran was geographically and administratively a part of what was called "Ghbaleh and its farms". In 1863, the inhabitants of Jouret Bedran and Azra, led by Rouhana Zouein, announced their separation from Ghbaleh and a separate entity named "Jouret Bedran and its suburbs" was created, and this, until 1872. In 1872, the inhabitants of Azra, led by Youssef Kamel, then known as Abou Hosn, announced their separation from Jouret Bedran and the installation of their own municipality.

== Families ==
The majority of the village's population holds the Ghanem surname. There are also inhabitants from the Zouein and Awad families.

The Ghanem family is descended from Moussa Ghanem, a descendant of the Ghassanids, who were a Christian dynasty in the Levant under the aegis of the Byzantine Empire. Moussa came to Yanouh in the 9th century and settled there. Later, in 1121, some of his descendants moved to Lehfed. According to the priest and historian Youssef Abi Saab (1985), in his book Tārīkh al-Kafūr, Kisrawān wa-Usarihā (“History of the Villages of Keserwan and Their Families”), drawing on Ghanem family correspondence, and providing a detailed account of the migration from Lehfed, one of Moussa Ghanem’s descendants, the muqaddam Ghanem, had three sons and a daughter named Marie, renowned for her beauty. During the Middle Ages, the muqaddam was an elected local leader who served as both commander and representative of his district and played a key role in assisting the Maronite patriarchs in safeguarding the interests of the Maronite community. Upon hearing of her, the Mamluk governor of Tripoli sought her hand in marriage. When her father refused, the governor allegedly came to Lehfed with his soldiers to seize her by force. According to the narrative, Marie’s brother Antonios disguised himself in her clothing and was handed over instead, allowing the rest of the family to flee toward the Nahr Ibrahim area. While en route to Tripoli, Antonios reportedly killed the governor under cover of night and escaped, later rejoining his family. Following this incident, supporters of the governor are said to have burned Lehfed in 1605.

== Places of worship ==
The main place of worship in the village is the Saint Stephen Church that serves as the seat of the Azra-Jouret Bedran parish, inaugurated in 1792 in a joint initiative from the inhabitants of Azra and Jouret Bedran. It is the third church ever built in the region, the first being the Saints Sergius and Bacchus Church built in nearby Ghbaleh in 1780 and the second being the Church of Our Lady also built in Ghbaleh in 1789.

Other places of worship are:

- Saint Joseph Church, built by Father Youssef Ghanem towards the end of the 19th century
- Saint George Church, built by Father Gerges Ghanem II
- Saint Charbel Church
