= Aramaic inscription of Yanouh =

Second century BC Aramaic inscription

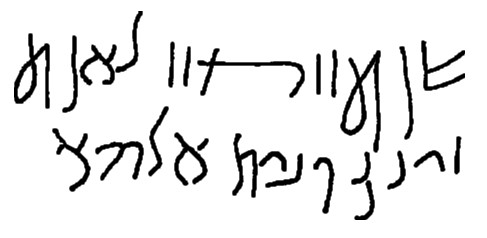
- The inscription reads: šnt 203 lʾnt(...?]) zy bnw byt ʾlhʾ (+?[1]
- Material: Sandstone
- Size: 75 cm × 40 cm × 40 cm (30 in × 16 in × 16 in)
- Writing: Aramaic
- Created: 110–109 BC
- Discovered: 1960s Discovered reused as spolia in the protobyzantine basilica of Yanouh, Lebanon
- Discovered by: H. Kalayan

The Aramaic inscription of Yanouh is a fragmentary two-line inscription written in the Aramaic alphabet, carved on a sandstone block, discovered in the 1960s in the Sanctuary of Yanouh, Lebanon. Found re-used in a Byzantine period basilica, the inscribed stone is dated to the year 203 of the Seleucid era, corresponding to 110–109 BC. It mentions the construction of a temple, possibly by the Ituraeans, a people of Arab origin, who established a principality in the region. Its script has been compared with Nabataean, Edessan, and Palmyrene forms. It has been described as the earliest attested public use of Aramaic in Mount Lebanon.

== Discovery and context ==
The inscription was first identified in the 1960s during excavations led by the Lebanese archaeologist Haroutune Kalayan at the site of Yanouh, located in the hinterland of Byblos (modern Jbeil), in the northern Lebanese mountains. It was found on ashlar masonry stone re-used as a door jamb in a Byzantine basilica, though its original placement was in a sandstone Hellenistic-era cultic structure.

== Description and interpretation ==
The Yanouh inscription is crafted from local sandstone. The stone block measures 75 cm × 40 cm (30 in × 16 in), and 40 cm (16 in) in thickness. It bears a fragmentary inscription of two surviving lines in Aramaic that reads as follows.

Line	Aramaic text	Reconstruction
(1)	[...] šnt 203 lʾnt [...]	[...] year 203 for (the deity) ’nt [...]
(2)	[...] zy bnw byt ’lh’ [...]	[...] who built the house of god(s) [...]
Missing text is enclosed in [square brackets].

The date "203" is based on the Seleucid era calendar, placing the inscription in 110–109 BC. (Note: Alternative interpretations of the era include the Actium era (31 BC) which would place the inscription in 172–173 AD, but this era was not widely used in Lebanon.) The reference to "’nt" remains unclear, but may denote a local deity. The script displays features resembling Nabataean (e.g., beth, lamed, nun), Edessan (e.g., aleph, taw with a loop), and Palmyrene (yodh) letter forms. Briquel-Chatonnet and Bordreuil regarded the letter forms as evidence of a local Aramaic script with affinities to several other traditions. Comparisons have been drawn to the El-Māl inscription (late first century BC) and the Sr‘ bilingual (dated to 203 of the Seleucid era, 110–109 BC), though the Yanouh script appears more developed. The text is considered significant as the first attested use of Aramaic as a public language in Mount Lebanon; Julien Aliquot, Bordreuil and Briquel-Chatonnet, relate the inscription to the use of Aramaic among the Ituraeans.

Briquel-Chatonnet interpreted the contrast with contemporary Phoenician inscriptions from Byblos as possible evidence for a different political or cultural context in the mountain hinterland. Briquel-Chatonnet discussed the inscription in connection with the Ituraeans, people of Arab-origin, who established a principality in the Beqaa Valley and northern Lebanon by the first century BC. This hypothesis is supported by the presence of Aramaic letters (beth and mim) on a coin of Lysanias, an Ituraean ruler, interpreted as Bar Ma‘nay ("son of Mennaios"). The inscription's date (110–109 BC), predating the known consolidation of Ituraean power under Ptolemy, son of Mennaios (c. 84 BC). The inscription thus suggests that the Ituraeans were already established in the northern Lebanon mountains by the late second century BC, challenging earlier assumptions that they were nomadic raiders. The dedication of a temple indicates that the Ituraeans had adopted Aramaic for official use while maintaining distinct cultural practices. The inscription's location near Byblos, a Phoenician stronghold, may reflect Ituraean expansion into the hinterland.
