= Yanouh =

Yanouh may refer to:

- Yanouh, Byblos, a historic Lebanese village in the district of Byblos
  - Sanctuary of Yanouh, a historic temple complex in the village
- Yanouh, Tyre, a Lebanese village in the southern district of Tyre
- Yanuh-Jat, a congregation of two villages Yanuh and Jat in the north district of Israel
