= Ganem =

Ganem is a surname and given name which may refer to:

== Surname ==
- Bruno Ganem (born 1986), Brazilian politician
- Donald Ganem (born 1950), American physician and virologist
- Edy Ganem, American actress

== Given name ==
- Ganem W. Washburn (1823–1907), American lawyer, judge, and politician

== See also ==
- Ghanem, another given name and surname
