= Shihab Ghanem =

Emirati engineer and author

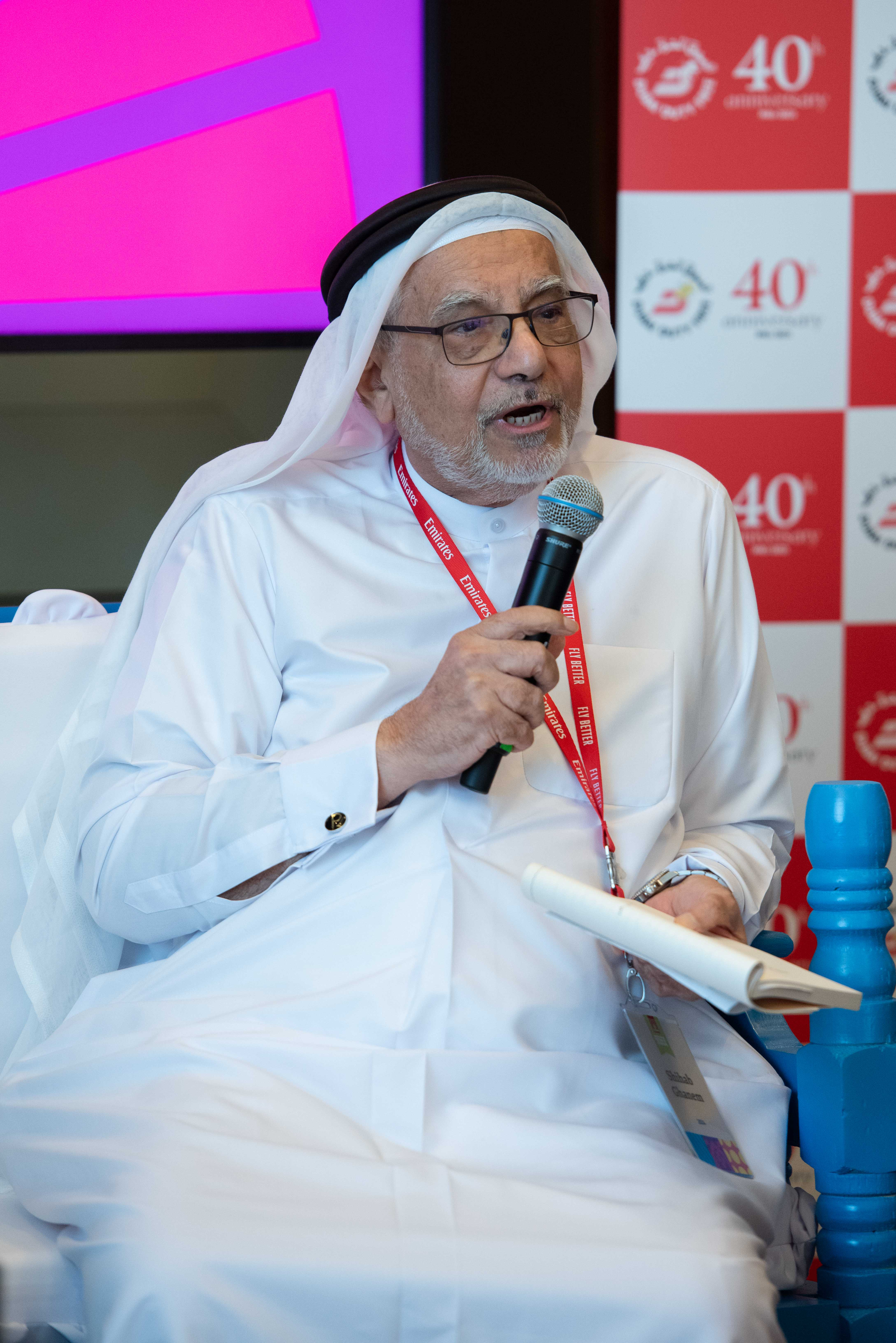
- Born: 1940 (age 85–86); Aden
- Citizenship: United Arab Emirates
- Writing career
- Language: Arabic
- Website: www.shihabghanem.com

Shihab Ghanem (Arabic: شهاب غانم) (born 1940) is an Emirati engineer, administrator, poet and author.

Ghanem was the first Arab to win The Tagore Peace Award in 2012 from the Asian Society in Calcutta, India, the Poetry Award for Culture & Humanism in 2013 from the World Poetry Society Intercontinental, Chennai, India; and the Cultural Personality of the Year in 2013 from Al-Owais Creativity Award, Dubai, UAE.

Ghanem is also a translator, translating modern Arabic poems into English, as well as works from around the world into Arabic. His poems have been translated into 12 languages.

== Biography ==
Shihab Muhammad Abduh Ghanem Al-Hashmi was born in Aden in 1940 and completed his secondary education at Aden College. He then obtained a double degree in Mechanical and Electrical engineering from Aberdeen University in Scotland in 1964. Ghanem obtained a master's degree in Water Resources Development from Roorkee University in India in 1975 and a Doctorate in industrial development from the economics department of Cardiff University in Wales in 1989. He became a Fellow of the Institution of Mechanical Engineers of UK in 1990, and a Fellow of the Institute of Management of UK in 1990. He also received an honorary Doctorate in 2015 from Soka University in Japan.

== Engineering career ==
Ghanem worked as Deputy Permanent Secretary of Public Works and Communications in Aden, Chief engineer of Eterno Supplies in Lebanon, Plant Manager of Gulf Eternit in Dubai. He was editor of "World of Engineering" from 1996 to 1999. Between 1988 and 2023 he worked as Director of Engineering of DP World and Jebel Free Zone, and managing director of Mohammed Bin Rashid Technology Park.

== Literary career ==
Ghanem was editor of Aden College magazine (1957–60), committee member of Al-Muntada, the UAE first literary magazine (1983–87), member of the advisory committee of Shuoon Adabiyah UAE writers magazine (2003–2005), member of advisory committee of Kalima translation project (2011–2015), advisor of Aden College website since it was established in 2009, advisor of Al-Mishkat literary magazine since 2012, and an Advisory member of Kalima project. He is the co-founder and advisor of the international poetry festival Poetic Heart since 2011.

Ghanem has published 62 books, including 24 collections of translations of verse from Arabic to English or English to Arabic. His 16 poetry books include works in Arabic such as Complete Poetry works (2009), One Hundred and One Poems (2011), and Al-Amwaj (2015), as well as works which have been translated into English: Shades of Love (1995), In the Valley of the Muses (2011) and other collections.

Ghanem's 22 prose works include: Industrialization in the United Arab Emirates (in English, Avebury, U.K., 2002), Bayn Madinatain (Biography of his father in Arabic) (2008), 1500 English Proverbs with Arabic Equivalents (Express Printing, 2015), Al-Fatihah (in English co-authored with his son Dr Waddah Ghanem, Patridge, Singapore 2016)

== Awards ==
Shihab Ghanem was awarded the Tagore Peace Prize in 2013 from the Asiatic Society based in India for his "significant contribution to the development of Human Understanding towards peace". He is the first Arab to receive this award. He also received the Poetry Award for Culture and Humanism from <World Poetry Society Intercontinental the same year. He was the recipient of the Rashid Prize for Scientific Excellence in 1989, the Ibha Literary Club poetry prize from Saudi Arabia and The Dubai Kairali Kala Kendram award for literature (both in 1996), as well as the *Al Owais Prize For Innovation & Scientific Research in 1999. he has also been Honoured by the Minister of Culture and Tourism in Yemen and the UAE Society of Engineers in 1999, and the Minister of Culture in Tunis in 2000.

== Personal life ==
Ghanem's paternal grandfather Abduh Ghanem (1889–56) was a legislative council member and president of the Arab Reform Club in Tawahi, Aden. His maternal grandfather advocate and novelist Mohammed Ali Lokman (1898–1966) was a renaissance figure in Aden and established the first Arabic and first English independent newspapers there. His father is Arab poet Muhammad Abduh Ghanem (1912–1994).

Ghanem lives in Dubai, UAE and has three children.
