= Sanctuary of Yanouh =

Ancient sanctuary in Lebanon

- معبد يانوح (Arabic)
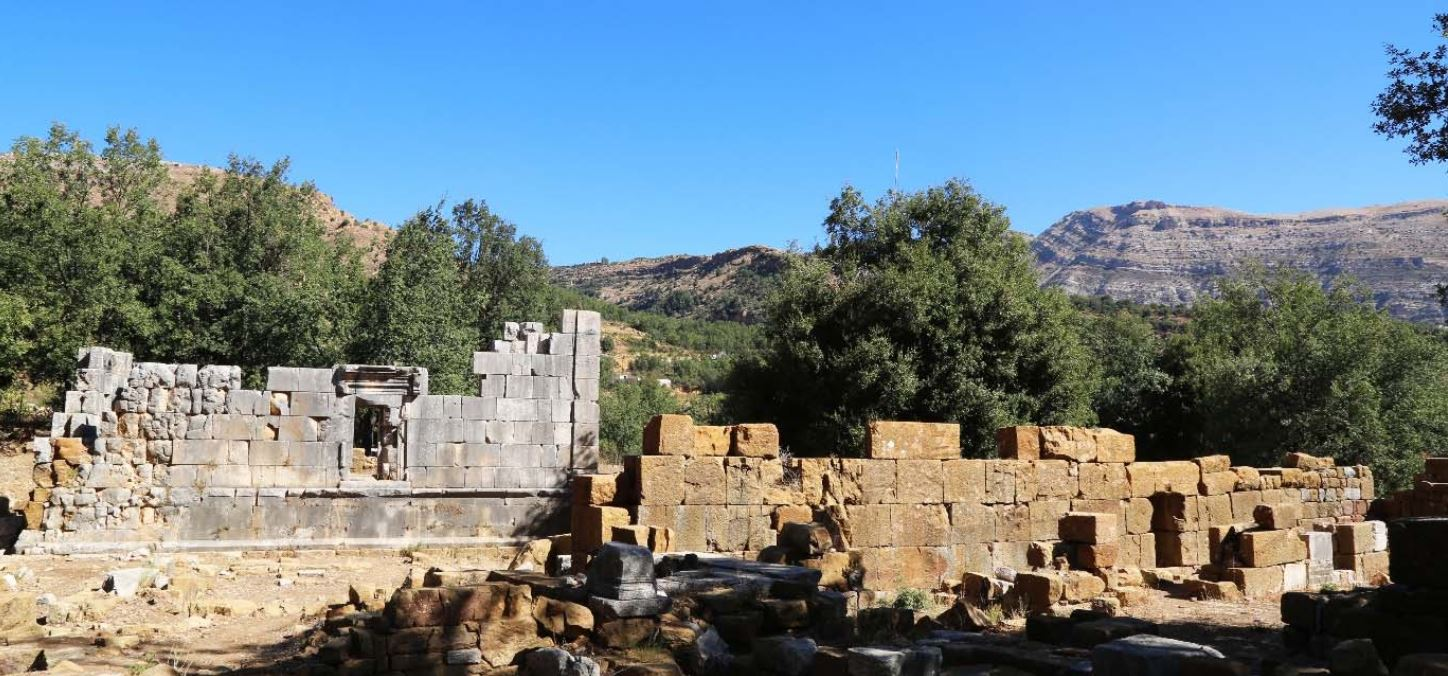
- Remains of the basilica, the small temple, temenos and the great temple of Yanouh

- Location within Lebanon
- 34.10343°N 35.8846°E
- Location: Yanouh, Byblos, Mount Lebanon Governorate, Lebanon

History
- Built: Hellenistic cultic structure: second century BC; Roman sanctuary: first half of the second century AD

Site notes
- Architectural styles: Corinthian order, Roman
- Governing body: Lebanese Directorate General of Antiquities

The Sanctuary of Yanouh, locally known as Mar Girios el-Azraq (Arabic: مار جريس الأزرق, lit. 'Saint George the Blue'), is a historic temple complex in the village of Yanouh, in Lebanon's Byblos hinterland. The origins of the sanctuary lay in the Hellenistic period, with significant expansion under Roman rule, and later Christian reuse. It is situated on a mountain slope above the upper Adonis River (Nahr Ibrahim) valley, at approximately 1,165 metres (3,822 ft) above sea level. The site lies along the ancient pilgrimage route linking the Phoenician coast to the sanctuary of Aphaca at the river's headwaters. The death of Adonis, a god associated with beauty, and seasonal vegetation renewal, was commemorated in annual rites held along the river.

The site encompasses a succession of sacred buildings spanning from the second century BC through the medieval period. Its remains include a second-century AD tetrastyle prostyle Roman temple built of distinctive blue-grey limestone within a walled temenos (sacred precinct surrounding a temple), a smaller adjacent Roman temple, and a late-fifth- to early sixth-century three-aisled Christian basilica constructed partly with the temple's blocks. The earliest phase is attested by a second-century BC Aramaic inscription commemorating the consecration of a "House of God" (byt'lh'), the oldest known Aramaic text in the Lebanese mountains. The inscription records the foundation of an earlier Hellenistic-era cultic structure and is linked to the Ituraeans, an Arabized Levantine people who controlled the region at the time. The large Roman temple, oriented to the east within a porticoed peribolos (wall enclosing a sacred precinct), incorporates distinctly local architectural features alongside Roman elements, like an adyton with a shell-shaped niche and two lateral cella windows, uncommon in Roman temples. The titulary deity of the temple remains unidentified, though a relief fragment known as the "Lady of Yanouh", depicting a veiled mourning goddess, has been associated with the Aphrodite of Aphaca and the Venus lugens 'Venus in mourning' tradition.

In later history, Yanouh became a major Maronite center, serving as the seat of the Maronite Patriarchate from 750 to 1277 AD, in which time the large Roman temple was converted into a church dedicated to Saint George. The site is explicitly mentioned in a papal bull issued by Pope Innocent III in 1215. Following the Mamluk takeover in the second half of the 13th century, the site was largely abandoned.

Archaeological investigations at Yanouh began with Ernest Renan's 19th-century survey. Further excavations were conducted from 1999 to 2005, jointly led by Saint Joseph University, the Lebanese Directorate General of Antiquities, and the Institut Français du Proche-Orient. These investigations documented continuous occupation at the nearby archaeological site of Tell el-Kharayeb, from the Early Bronze Age into medieval times.

== Location ==
Yanouh lies approximately 33 km (21 mi) east of the coastal city of Byblos (ancient Gubla) and 60 km north of Beirut, in the Byblos District of Mount Lebanon Governorate. The Yanouh sanctuary occupies a hillside on the right bank of the Nahr Ibrahim (Adonis River), at about 1,165 m (3,822 ft) above sea level. Yanouh overlooks the upper Nahr Ibrahim valley which is shaped like a broad amphitheater bordered by the mountains of Jabal el-Laqlouq to the north, Jabal el-Mnaitra to the east, and Jabal Moussa to the south. Toward the west and downstream, the valley narrows at the edge of Qartaba. The sanctuary lies along the old mountain road from Byblos toward the Nahr Ibrahim headwaters at Aphaca (modern Afqa), placing it on an important ancient route for goods and pilgrims traveling between the coast and the Beqaa valley. During the Roman era (63 BC – 337 AD), (Note: Levantine chronologies begin the Roman period in 64 BC with Pompey's annexation of the area, whereas the British classical historian Fergus Millar adopts 32 BC to avoid the complexities of the late Roman Republic and to frame the Near East from the battle of Actium onward; he ends in 337 AD because Emperor Constantine I's death marks the onset of major religious and institutional transformations that redefine the region.) imperial authorities paid special attention to the valley, overseeing the establishment of forest reserves on nearby mountains, the placement of boundary markers, and the laying out of a road to the Beqaa via the Aqoura pass. The pass retained its strategic importance into the medieval period, when it came under the control of the Crusader fortress of Moinestre (Mnaitra).

The Yanouh archaeological site comprises three main sectors: the sanctuary sector; Tell el-Kharayeb, situated to the south of the sanctuary; and the region within a 600 m (2,000 ft) radius of Tell el-Kharayeb and the sanctuary, featuring the remnants of Christian chapels, predominantly dating from the medieval period.

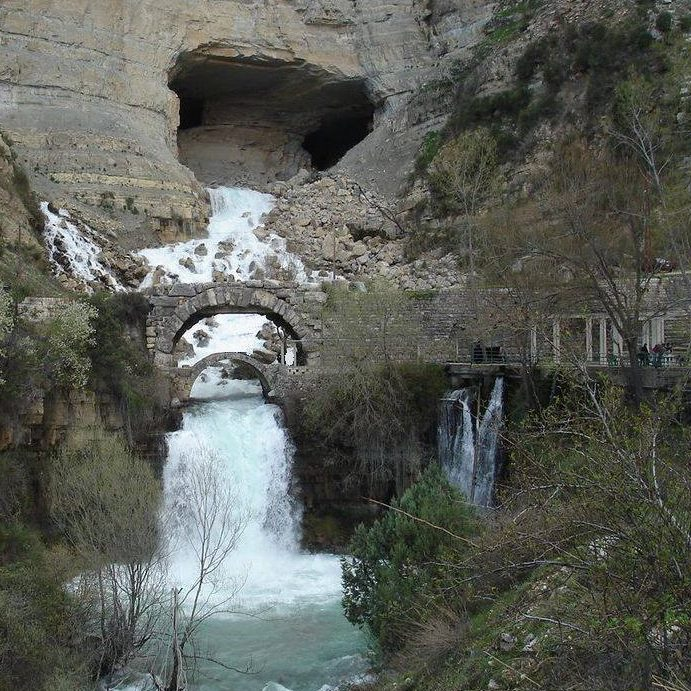
Grotto of Aphaca, a major cultic center at the Adonis River headwaters

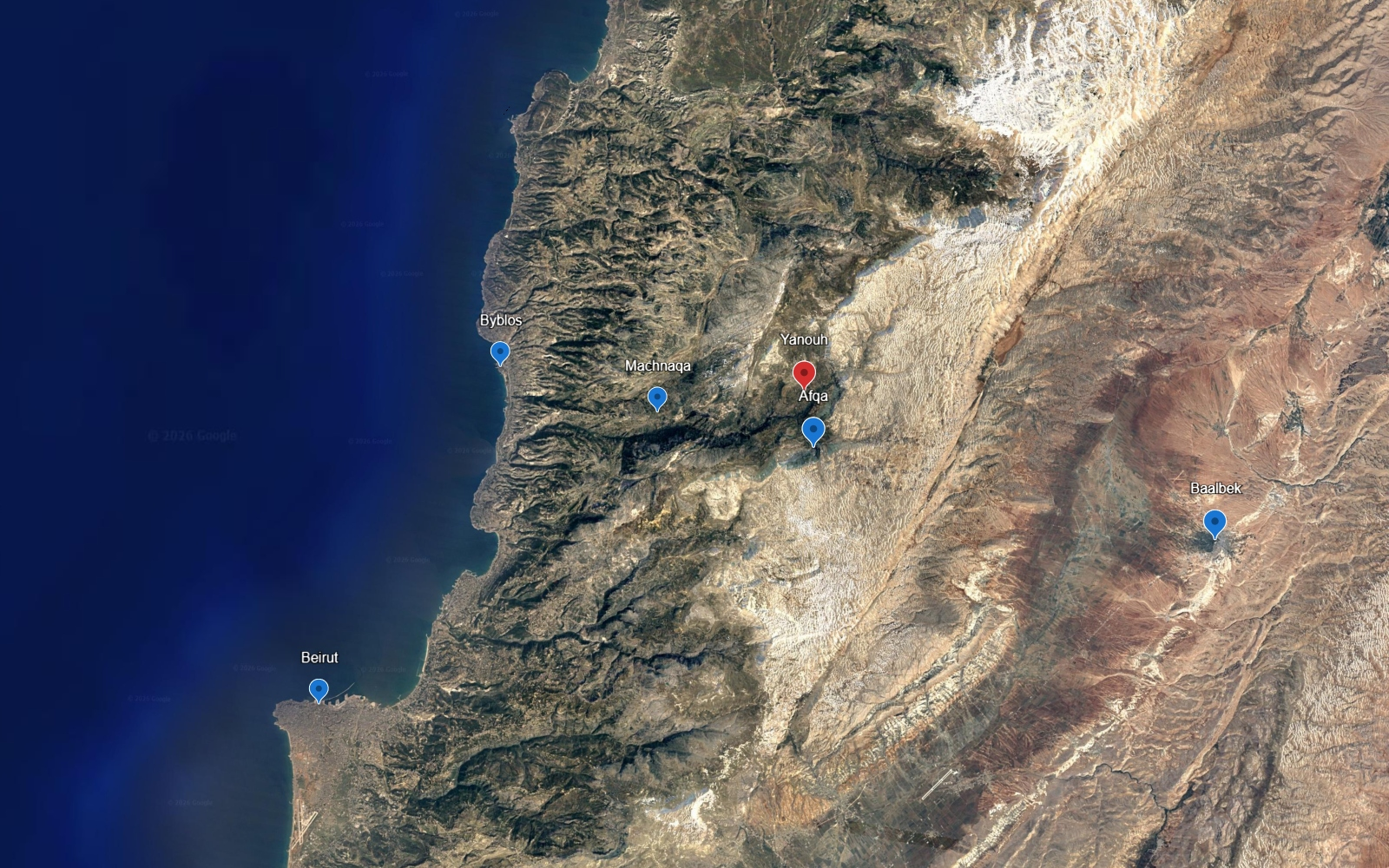
Location map of Yanouh, Machnaqa, and Aphaca cultic sites in relation to Byblos, Beirut and Baalbek

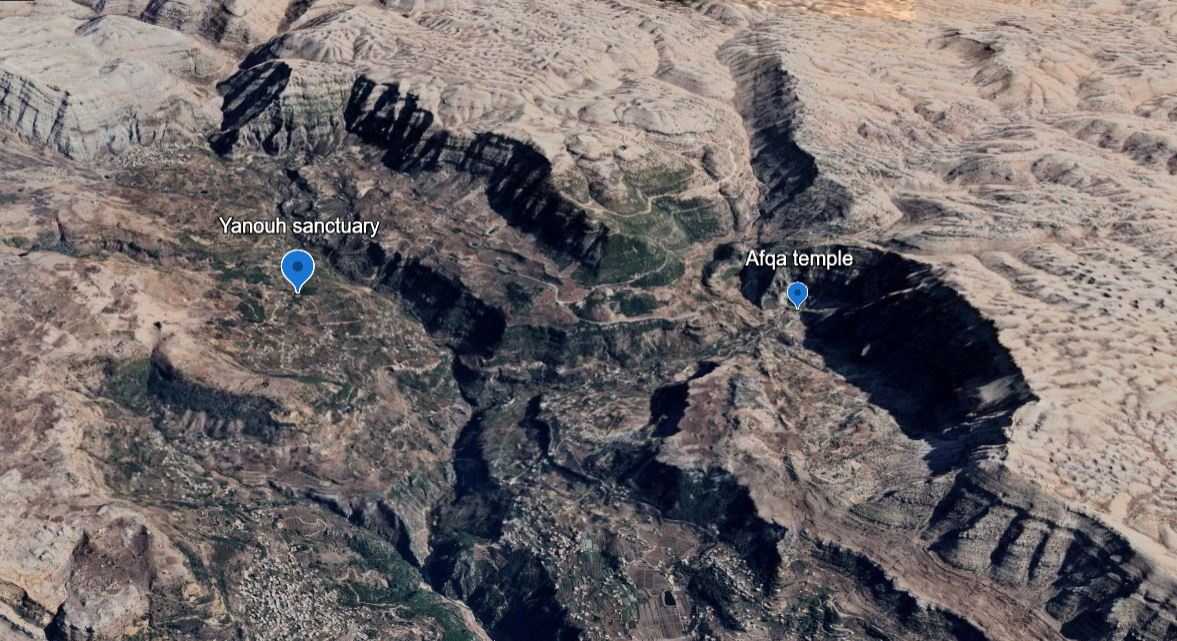
Location map of Yanouh and Aphaca temples

== Etymology ==
The name Yanouh (Arabic: يانوح) is of Semitic origin. The local historian and toponymist Tony Mufarrej interprets it as deriving from an Aramaic root meaning "rest" or "tranquility". In Crusader and Maronite Christian usage, the site's shrine became known as Saydet Yanouh ('Our Lady of Yanouh'), and Sanctae Mariae de Yanoch ('Saint Mary of Yanouh'). The Great Temple is known to locals as Mar Girios el-Azraq (Arabic: مار جريس الأزرق, lit. 'Saint George the Blue'), so named because of the blue-gray color of the great temple's limestone ashlar, and its connection with the Christian Saint George to whom a Maronite church was dedicated in the repurposed temple building. The town's archaeological tell is called Tell el-Kharayeb (Arabic: تل الخرائب, lit. 'Hill of Ruins').

== History ==
=== Prehistoric and Bronze Age settlement ===
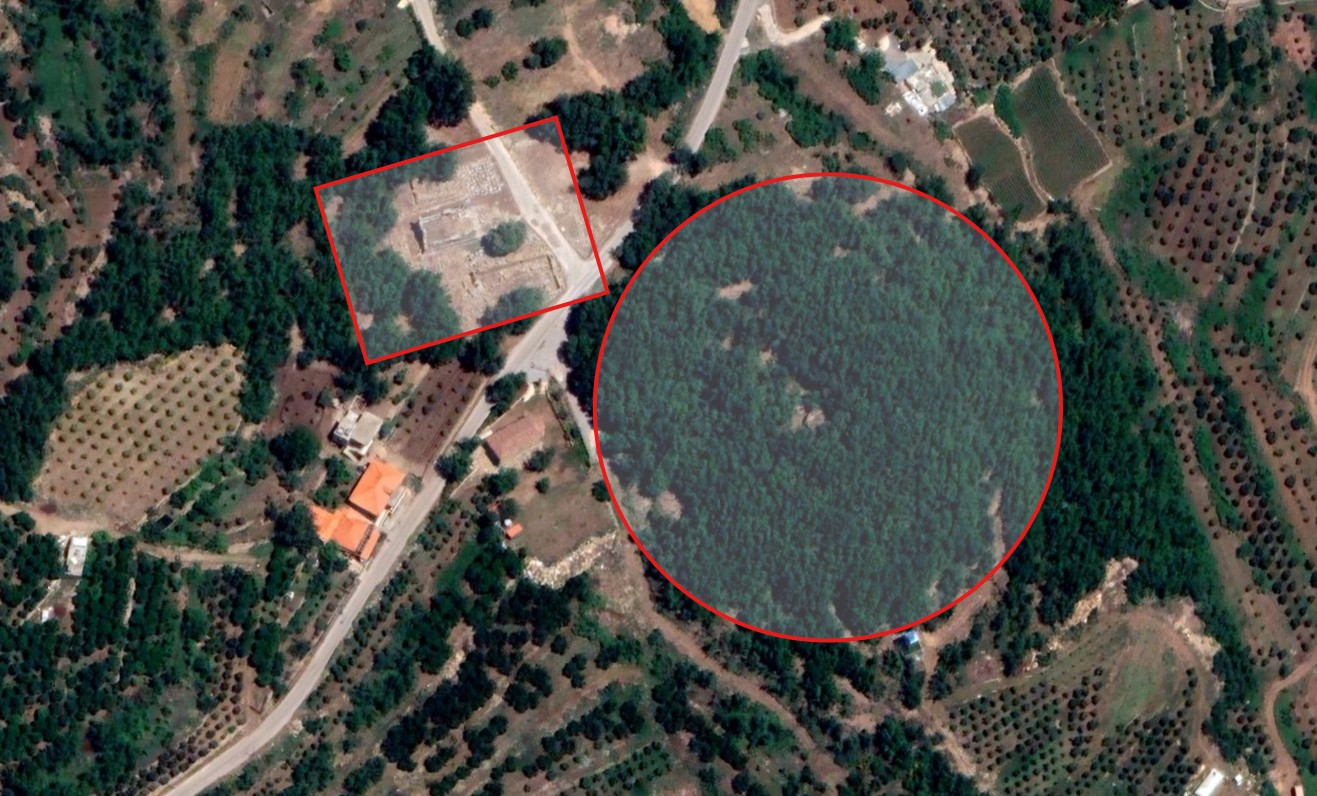
Sanctuary area (outlined by the rectangle) and Tell el-Kharayeb (circled), Yanouh; aerial view

Archaeological investigations in the Nahr Ibrahim basin have identified Yanouh's Tell el-Kharayeb preserves a deep stratigraphic sequence spanning several millennia, from the Early Bronze Age II (3000–2700 BC) through the medieval period. The earliest known settlement covers approximately six hectares (15 acres) and dates to the early third millennium BC. Evidence suggests human presence extends further back, with residual Neolithic material dating to the sixth millennium BC. Additionally, charcoal-rich soil layers suggest that people were clearing forest areas as far back as the fifth millennium BC. The site preserves several meters of stratified occupation deposits. Large storage vessels dating back to the Bronze Age have also been found, alongside evidence of the development of an agrarian economy and a sedentary population engaged in organized agriculture and craft production.

=== Phoenician period and cultic role ===
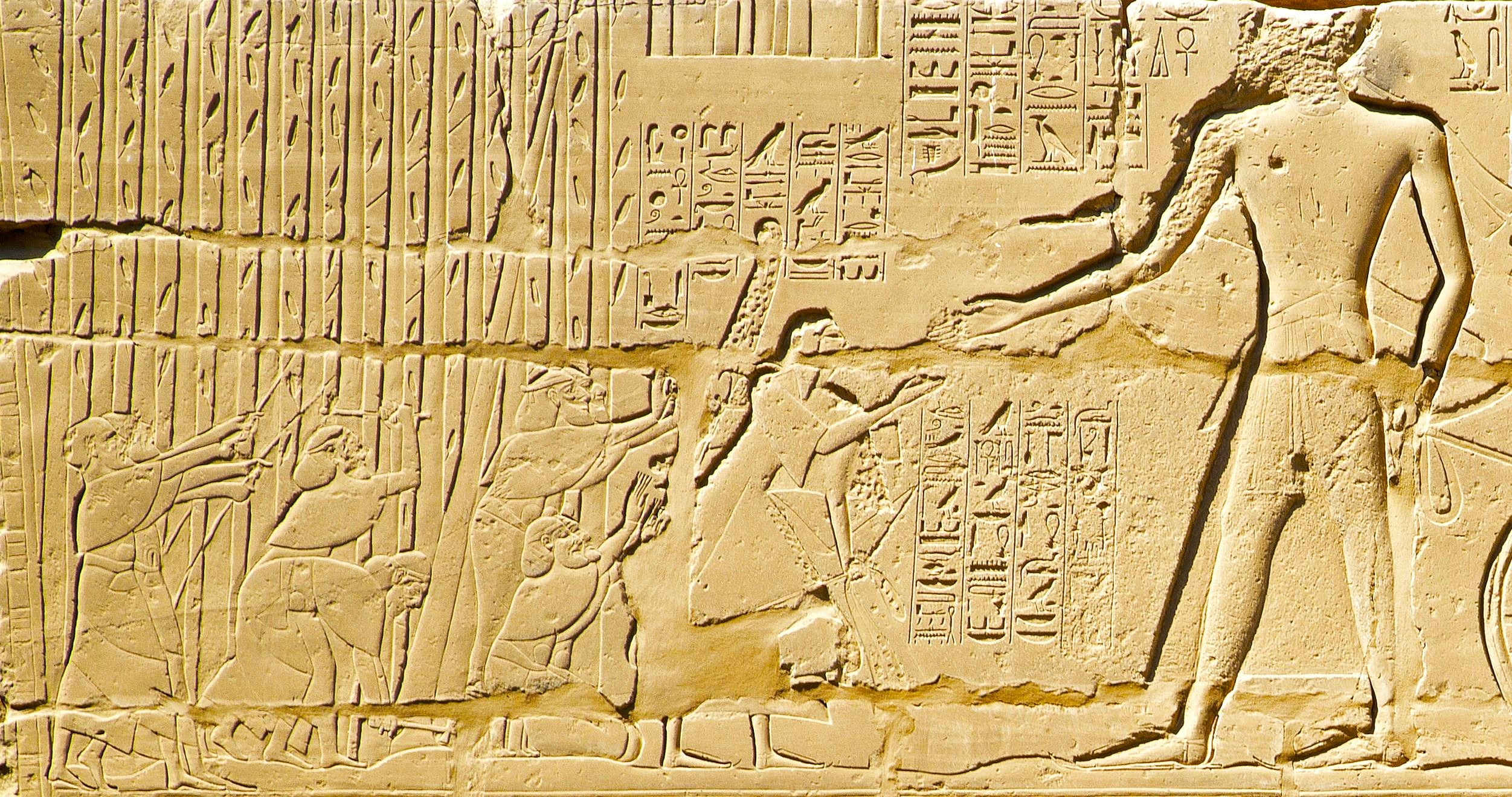
The Chiefs of Lebanon felling trees for Seti I. Relief from Pylon III of the Great Hypostyle Hall of the Karnak Temple.

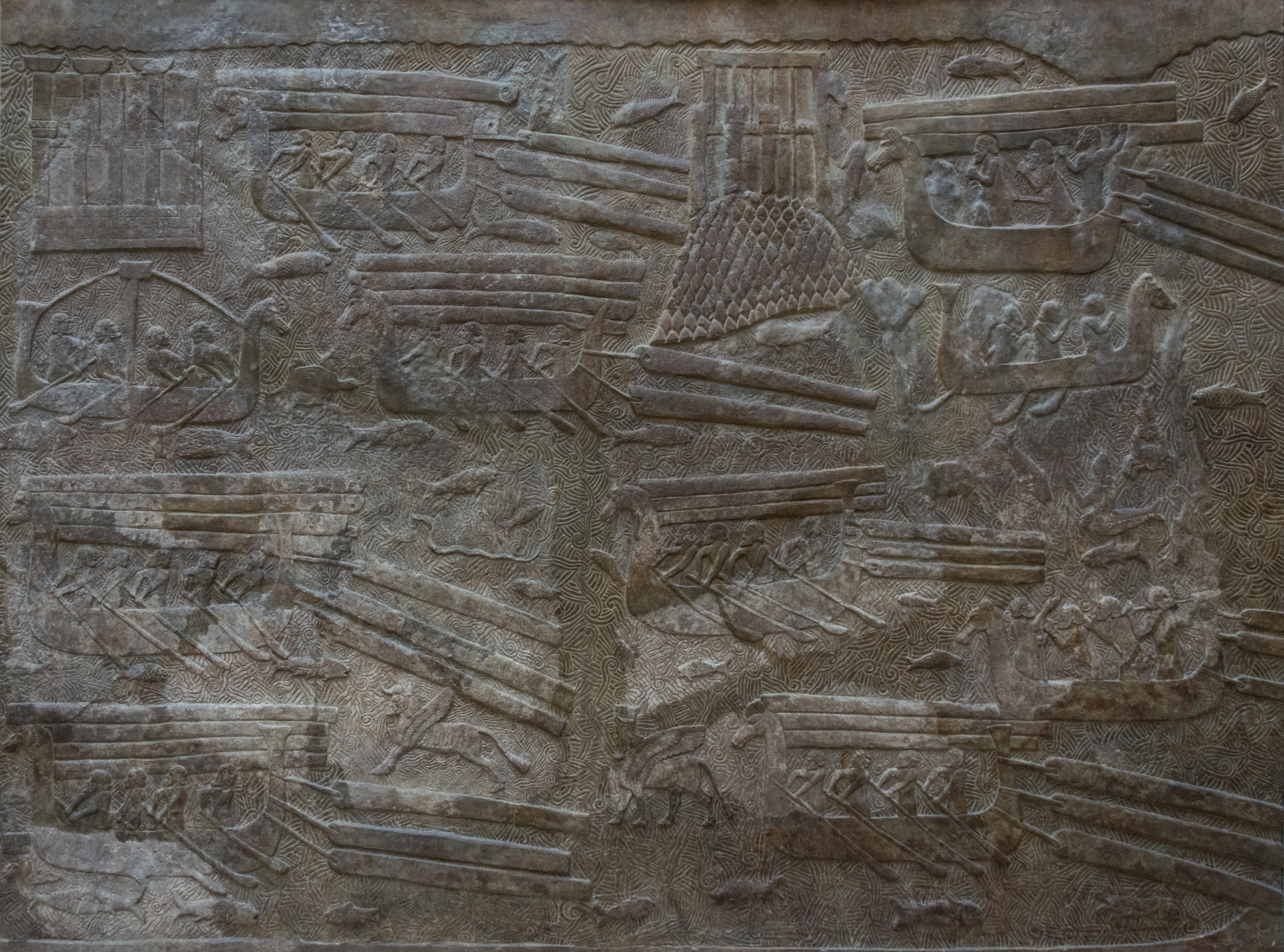
Transporting cedar wood from Lebanon from the north facade of the courtyard of Sargon II's Dur-Sharrukin Palace in Iraq, eighth century BC

During the Phoenician era, corresponding to the Iron Age (1200–332 BC) Yanouh was as a satellite settlement in the mountainous hinterland of the Phoenician city of Byblos, a coastal city famed for its export of cedar wood and mercantile fleet. Mount Lebanon and its forests were held sacred by the Phoenicians, who considered them as the personal domain of the god Baal, and cedar wood, renowned for its durability and resistance to decay, was highly prized in antiquity. The process of harvesting and transporting massive logs involved felling trees in the high-altitude forests of Mount Lebanon and utilizing the region's river systems to drive them downstream to Byblos for export. This trade was especially significant in Byblos' interactions with ancient Egypt, where cedar was in great demand for shipbuilding and monumental construction. Yanouh's Tell el-Kharayeb experienced significant growth by the mid-first millennium BC, and likely played a role in forest exploitation in the region. Excavations have uncovered Iron Age habitation layers, including terraced agriculture fields and pottery. A silver hoard discovered in 2006 contained a rare mix of Archaic Greek silver coins, early Phoenician silver issues from Byblos, Sidon, and Tyre, and numerous hacksilver fragments. (Note: The silver hoard's archaeological context and the absence of later Athenian or Macedonian coinage indicate a burial date around 480 BC. The find also places the beginning of Phoenician silver coinage in the early fifth century BC, earlier than previously thought.) Finds at Tell el-Kharayeb also include fine imported ceramics and Phoenician products that indicate trade connections with coastal cities. Residential remains from the early first century BC show that inhabitants cultivated land that would later be developed further under Roman rule. A number of classical sources identify Byblos and its upland territory as a principal setting of the myth of Adonis, particularly his fatal wounding and the mourning rites associated with him. The valley of the Adonis River carried an ancient route from the Phoenician coast up to its sources, where the sanctuary of Aphaca stood as a well-known pilgrimage site visited by travelers from Byblos. Ancient authors described the sanctuary itself: Lucian visited it and reported an ancient temple of Aphrodite there, said to have been founded by the legendary king Cinyras, and the later writer Zosimus described an oracular rite practiced at a pool near the temple. The high places of Yanouh and Machnaqa were among the cultic sites situated along this route.

=== Construction and reuse in the Hellenistic, Roman, and Byzantine periods ===
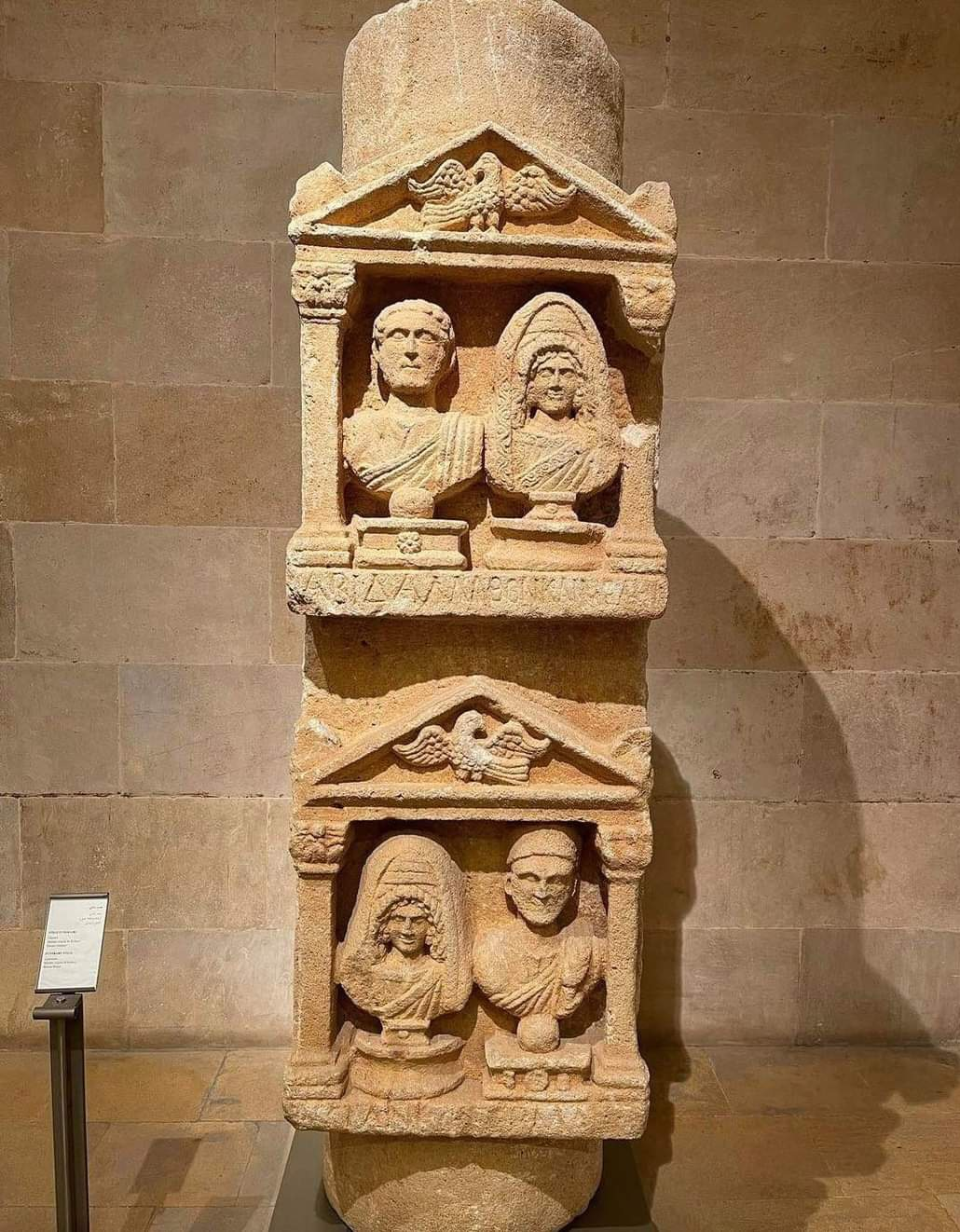
Funerary column of Qartaba (dated ca. 120–160 AD). By the first to second centuries AD the local population in the area of Yanouh was identified as Ituraean, an Arabized Levantine people. The column depicts two couples with Greco-Roman attire and Semitic or mixed-language names.

The earliest known cultic structure of the Yanouh complex was a sandstone edifice constructed in the Hellenistic period, in the latter half of the second century BC. This religious structure was dedicated to local deities, as evidenced by an Aramaic inscription found on site. Under Roman rule, in the first half of the second century AD, the existing Hellenistic cultic structure was expanded, with the addition of a large sanctuary and temenos (a sacred precinct surrounding a temple) to its north and a smaller temple on its eastern side. The sanctuary of Yanouh stood across the valley from the Temple of Adonis at Aphaca, overlooking the river whose periodic reddish tint, caused by natural sediment washed down from the mountains, was interpreted in antiquity as the blood of Adonis. In the Greco-Roman tradition, Adonis was associated with beauty, and seasonal vegetation renewal. At Byblos, annual ceremonies known as the Adonia commemorated his death and return.

In the proto-Byzantine period (324–457 AD), following an apparent decline in settlement activity during the third and fourth centuries AD, the construction of churches such as Mar Edna and the church of Yanouh. Towards the end of the fifth century or the beginning of the sixth century, a Christian basilica with columns was constructed outside the enclosure of the large Roman temple, at a time when pagan religious buildings had likely been abandoned for some time. According to Harfouche et al., the basilica is the oldest Christian religious monument of the Lebanese mountain. Significant modifications occurred at the site, including the partial dismantling of the small Roman temple. To the west of the main temple, a grape press was installed and was later replaced by an oil press. The original columned basilica was destroyed in the first half of the seventh century, possibly during the Sassanian Persian occupation or the Muslim conquest, and was replaced with a pillar basilica, and the site became a monastery.

=== Medieval and Ottoman periods ===
The sanctuary site was abandoned during the Abbasid period in the eighth century AD. Subsequent reoccupation is attested across the valley during the medieval period (12th and 13th centuries AD) by a range of surface-level installations; these remains include domestic hearths and artisanal features. The restoration of the basilica and the site's transformation reflect Yanouh's growing importance as a Maronite religious center and Maronite patriarchal seat (a residence of the patriarch, the supreme head, of the Maronite Church). New villages emerged and multiple chapels were constructed in the vicinity, likely influenced by the presence of the Maronite Patriarchate in the locality. However, by the second half of the 13th century, the site appears to have been largely abandoned following the Mamluk takeover of the region. Its use as a cemetery persisted until at least the 15th century, possibly due to the site's religious significance. The Mamluk and early Ottoman periods are poorly documented archaeologically, making written records the main sources for tracing the valley's history up to the abandonment of Yanouh, which may have occurred in the early 16th century, coinciding with the Shiite demographic expansion in the region. The last significant phase of development occurred in the nineteenth century, as reflected in the architectural remains of the period.

=== Excavation history ===
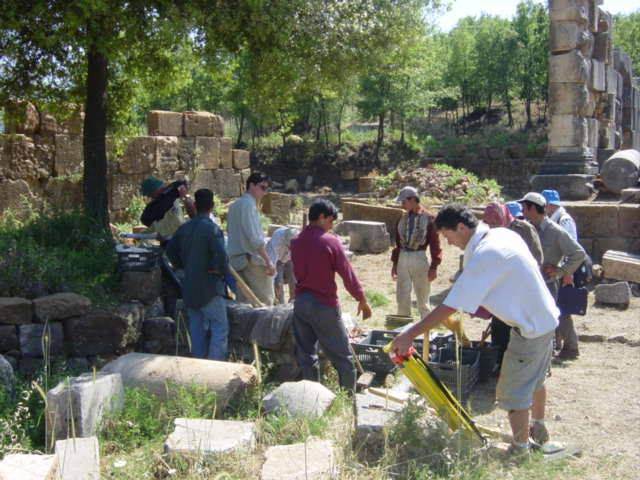
Members of the 2002 archaeological mission

The ruins of the Great Temple of Yanouh and remains of an ancient settlement were mentioned by French orientalist Ernest Renan in 1860, including the Roman temple transformed into a church, and a building located south of the sanctuary. Initial drawings of the site were published by the German architecture historian Daniel Krencker and the classical archaeologist Willy Zschietzschmann in 1938 in a work dedicated to the architectural study of temples in Syria and Lebanon. In the 1960s, a restoration operation was initiated by the Lebanese Directorate General of Antiquities. As part of this project, Lebanese archaeologist Haroutune Kalayan conducted restoration work on the temple, and excavated the structures around it. He uncovered the three-aisled church parallel to and south of the Great Temple, the northern chapel, and the Aramaic inscription. The site of Yanouh was further excavated during a 1999–2005 archaeological survey jointly led by the Saint Joseph University and the Directorate General of Antiquities of Lebanon, in partnership with the HiSoMA laboratory (UMR 5189) of the Maison de l'Orient et de la Méditerranée and the Institut Français du Proche-Orient. The archaeological survey, directed by the French archaeologist Pierre-Louis Gatier, was part of a larger mission focusing on surveying the upper Nahr Ibrahim valley in the Byblos hinterland. The mission investigated the occupation and development of the Lebanese mountain region, an area notable for the presence of the previously unexcavated Roman sanctuary of Aphaca. The survey also included the site of Machnaqa downstream from Yanouh.

==== Settlement hypotheses ====
Before the Nahr Ibrahim valley mission and the Yanouh excavations (1999–2005), scholars held conflicting views about the timeline of settlement and the construction of monumental temples in Lebanon's mountainous regions. In his 1864 Mission de Phénicie, Ernest Renan asserted that the Lebanon Mountains never had any large cities. In 1939, the French archaeologist Henri Seyrig proposed, based on the distribution of remains and the absence of Hellenistic period temples at the time of his writing, that monumental temple construction in the Lebanese mountains only began once villages developed during the Roman period. Before that, he argued, local communities likely had only "simple rustic sanctuaries, enclosures on elevated ground, where they worshiped shapeless idols in the open air". On the other hand, the French scholar Xavier de Planhol, writing in 1968, went as far as to suggest that the mountainous regions of Lebanon remained uninhabited until the early Middle Ages, when Maronite and Druze communities sought refuge in areas he described as nearly devoid of human presence. More recent surveys and excavations at the Yanouh sanctuary confirmed Seyrig's hypothesis regarding the Roman-era monumentalization.

== Structures and description ==
Plan of the sanctuary sector site showing, from top-left to bottom right in order: the medieval chapel (in olive green), the large temple within its peribolos wall, the Hellenistic sandstone building (in blue) and the small Roman temple next to it, and the early Byzantine peruid Christian basilica in dark red.

The sanctuary sector contains the remains of five main structures dating back to various time periods, the oldest a Hellenistic-era sandstone platform. Adjacent to the platform stood the small Roman-era temple and an early Byzantine period basilica. To the north, the small Roman-era temple and the Christian basilica lies the large Roman-era temple within its porticoed peribolos (wall enclosing the sacred precinct). The fifth and most recent structure within the sanctuary sector is the medieval Christian chapel that occupied a section of the northern peribolos wall.

=== Hellenistic-era cultic platform and Aramaic inscription ===
The sandstone Hellenistic-era structure consists of an elongated platform measuring 5.7 m × 7.2 m (19 ft × 24 ft). It dates back to the second century BC, and predates the site's monumentalization works carried out during the Roman period. The platform was accessible through steps on its long, southeast side. A survey conducted around the perimeter and in the western section of the ancient platform revealed that it was built in an area previously occupied during the Late Bronze and Early Iron Ages. The fragmentary Aramaic inscription carved on a 75 cm × 40 cm (30 in × 16 in) sandstone block was discovered in the spolia reused in the Christian basilica. The inscription commemorates the consecration of a "house of the god(s)" (byt'lh') by a group of people whose names are incomplete, in the year 203 of the Seleucid era, corresponding to 110–109 BC. The structure it refers to is believed to relate to the Hellenistic-era platform. The dated inscription is linked to the Ituraeans, who are thought to have established a presence in the area at that time, and is the earliest known example of an Aramaic inscription in the Lebanese mountains. (Note: Similar Aramaic inscriptions appear on coins minted by Lysanias, a dynast of Chalcis (fl. 40 – c. 36 BC), further corroborating the Ituraean use of Aramaic.)

=== Roman-era Small Temple ===
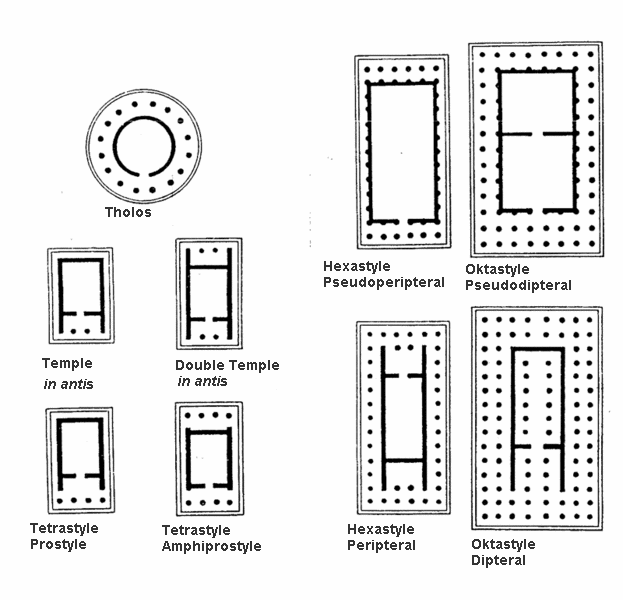
A diagram of the typology of classical temples. At the center-left is a depiction of a tetrastyle prostyle temple, like the ones in Yanouh.

East of and parallel to the platform stand the remains of a small, single-room Roman-era temple. Like the platform, the Small Temple faces the south-east. Only the foundation, a part of the podium and the first course of the west wall of the cella remain in place. It is situated outside the large temple's peribolos wall at a distance of 1.5 m (4.9 ft). The small temple's rectangular sandstone foundation is fully preserved; its last course covers an area 7.5 m (25 ft) long and 4.15 m (13.6 ft) wide. The temple sat on a low podium accessible via a 2.78 m (9.1 ft) wide staircase. The podium would have measured 6.3 m × 3.9 m (21 ft × 13 ft), and 1.1 m (3.6 ft) high; it was partly reused in the west wall of the early Byzantine period basilica, and the six-step staircase leading up to the temple was dismantled when the Byzantine basilica was built. The Small Temple was a limestone prostyle temple (a temple with a columned portico across the front facade only) of the Corinthian order. Its reconstruction was possible from surviving elements and spolia reused in later constructions. The temple likely had a tetrastyle pronaos (a pronaos with four front columns), with 37 cm (15 in) diameter shafts, corresponding to the width of a surviving pilaster. A 1.32 m (4.3 ft) deep pronaos gave access to a square plan cella measuring with sides measuring each 2.76 m (9.1 ft). The cella featured corner pilasters.

No block-level evidence survives for the Small Temple's elevation; the French architect-archaeologist Gérard Charpentier instead reconstructed it using the Corinthian order's proportional relationships, cross-referenced against the Great Temple's dimensions, yielding a total height of 4.56 m (15.0 ft) from the base of the pilaster to the upper edge of the cornice. The Small Temple is believed to be contemporaneous with the Great Temple, dated to the first half of the second century AD, and appears to extend the earlier Hellenistic-era building. Charpentier interpreted the Small Temple as part of the Roman-period transformation of the sanctuary and as a link between the earlier and later phases of worship. Both the Small Temple and the Hellenistic-era platform are arranged on a north–south axis shifted about ten degrees from the Great Temple, and separated from each other by a 0.7 m (2.3 ft) gap. Their south-facing facades were preceded by staircases submerged under paving of later levels. To the south of the courtyard, the remains of a square limestone altar base associated with the Small Temple were uncovered; it had been leveled and integrated into the courtyard paving by the seventh century AD.

=== The Great Temple and temenos ===
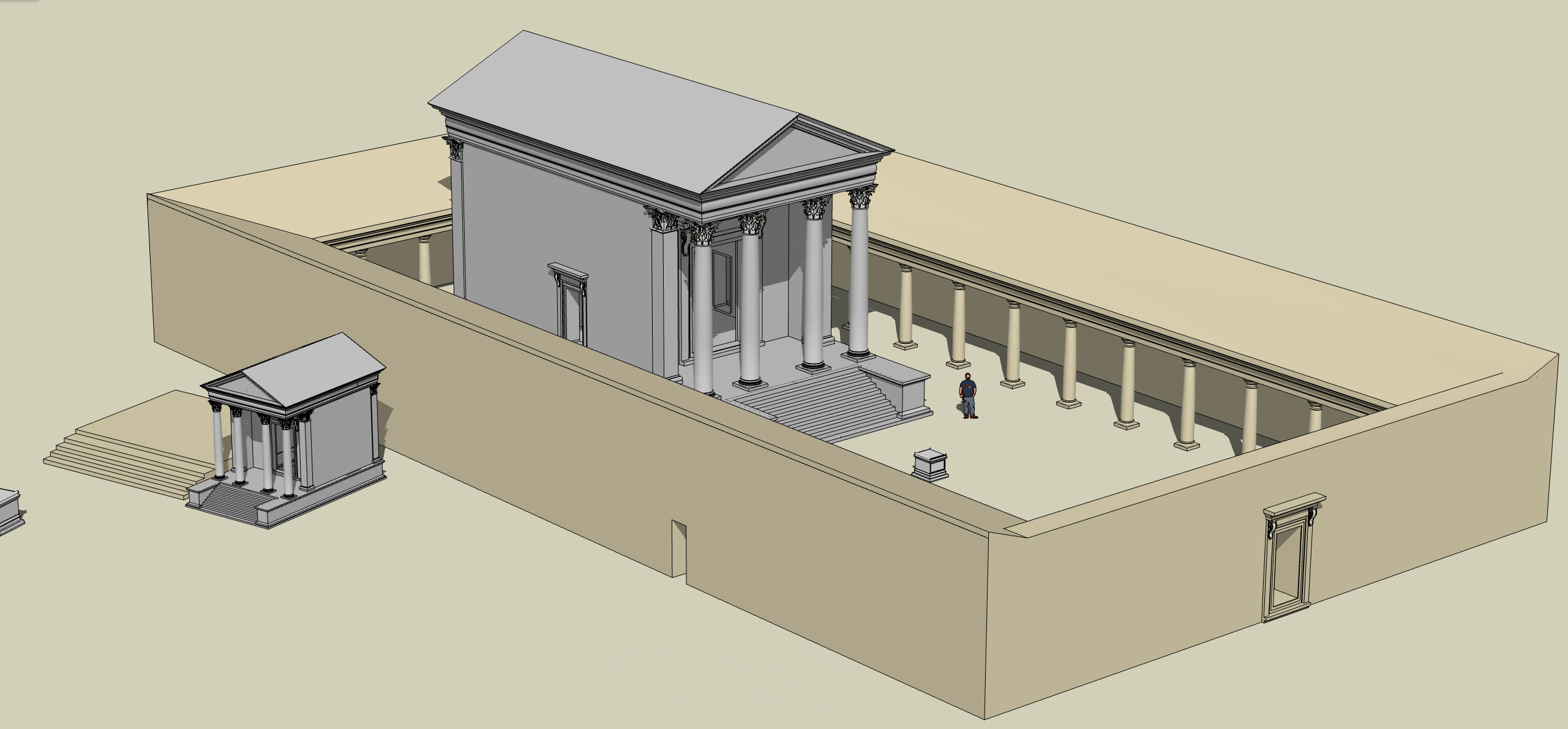
Digital architectural maquette illustrating a reconstruction of the sanctuary at Yanouh

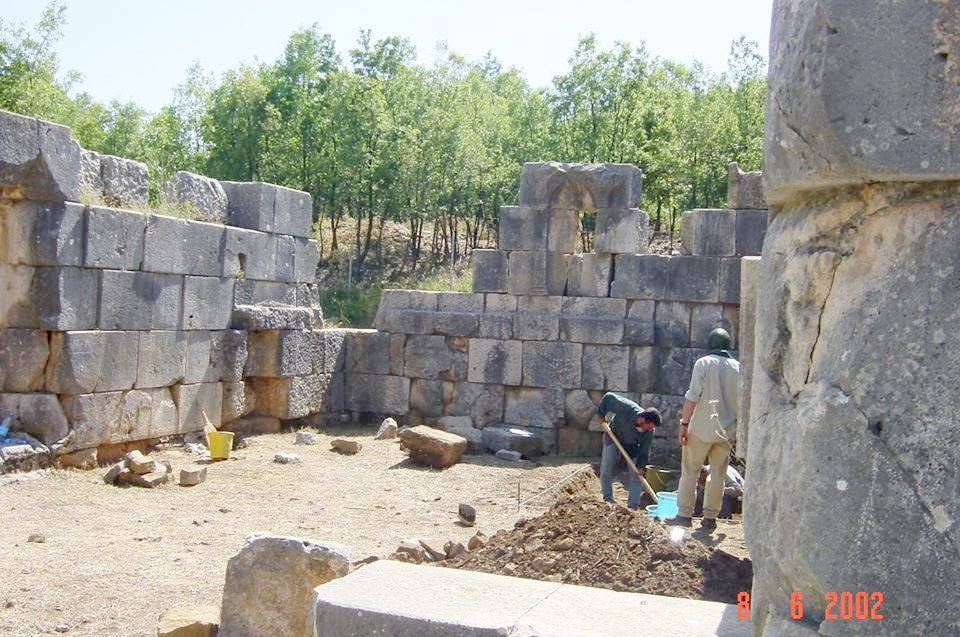
Cella of the large Roman temple at Yanouh

North of the platform and the Small Temple stretches a large rectangular temenos measuring 51.2 m × 28.4 m (168 ft × 93 ft) housing the site's large temple and a monumental open-air altar, of which only three sandstone foundation blocks remain. The temenos is enclosed by a 1.1 m (3.6 ft) wide peribolos wall, constructed from sandstone ashlar blocks assembled with dry joints. An inner columnated portico ran along the peribolos, with a monumental gate opening to the east. The temenos and the large temple are oriented to the east and were built around the same time as the Small Temple. The large temple is built on a rectangular podium measuring 20.30 m × 9.65 m (66.6 ft × 31.7 ft). Visible elements of the large temple are constructed from blue-grey limestone ashlar blocks, contrasting with the peribolos wall made of yellow sandstone. The ashlar blocks are laid in regular courses, with an average height of 64 centimetres (25 in).

The large temple measures 17 m × 8.5 m (56 ft × 28 ft). It is a tetrastyle prostyle building in the Corinthian order, (Note: Krencker and Zschietzschmann incorrectly described the temple as a distyle in antis.) comprising a pronaos and a cella extended by a raised adyton (innermost sanctuary). A nine-step stairway at the front of the temple led to the pronaos. This stairway was dismantled during a later phase of occupation. The pronaos is framed by two antae, and two unfluted column drums from the original four-column pronaos colonnade have survived into modern times. Each column stood 6 m (20 ft) tall and was composed of three drums: two measuring 1.92 m (6.3 ft) in height and one measuring 2.16 m (7.1 ft). The columns were surmounted by Corinthian capitals measuring 0.86 m (2.8 ft) in height. The height of the architrave (the lowest beam of the entablature, the moldings and bands which lie horizontally above columns) is estimated at 0.54 m (1.8 ft). Based on a frieze block recovered from the collapse, which measures 0.31 m (1.0 ft) in height, the entablature was estimated to have an average height of 1.45 m (4.8 ft). The well-preserved cornice block at the top of the temple's east facade permitted the reconstruction of the pediment which had a slope of 26 degrees. The pronaos opened through a monumental doorway measuring 4.8 m × 2.4 m (15.7 ft × 7.9 ft) to the square cella which had an area of 7.2 m^{2} (78 sq ft). (Note: 10.8 m × 7.2 m (35 ft × 24 ft) with the adyton included.)

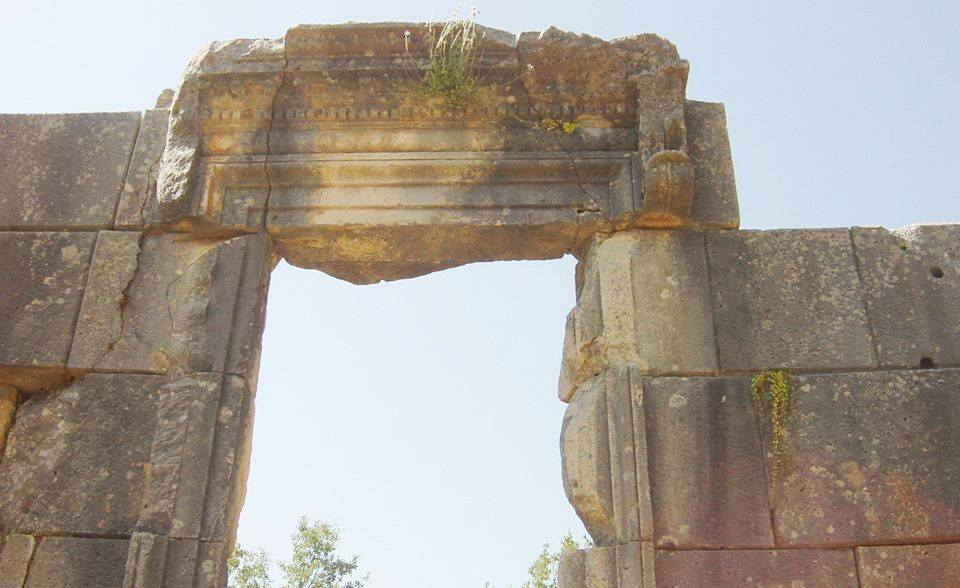
Cella window architrave

The center of the cella is flanked by two well-preserved lateral windows measuring 2.4 m × 1.2 m (7.9 ft × 3.9 ft) oriented along the north and south walls. The lintels of the windows are located in the fifth layer of masonry. The positioning of the windows within the cella, as well as their external design, gives them a door-like character; they feature a molded frame topped by a bracketed lintel decorated with an egg-and-dart frieze, a dentil course, a crown molding, and finally, a sima. The crown molding ends with ornate voluted corbels. The interiors of the windows are smooth and unadorned. The layout of the cella is based on a tripartite division along its main axis. A square lower level occupies the eastern two-thirds of the cella's length, its center aligned with the north–south axis of the lateral windows. The cella's large door was twice as high and wide as the lateral windows. The paving of the cella is not preserved, but marks at the base of the walls show that it sloped slightly to facilitate cleaning and the draining of water into a pipe running through the wall. The far, western third of the cella was occupied by the adyton platform, which measured 7.10 m × 3.6 m (23.3 ft × 11.8 ft) and was raised 1.92 m (6.3 ft) above the cella floor. The staircase leading to the adyton platform comprised eleven steps, the first of which was aligned with the west jamb of the lateral windows. An ornate arched 0.6 m-deep (2.0 ft) niche, designed to house a statue of a deity, survives, integrated into the back wall of the adyton in the temple's median axis. The niche's semi-dome is shell-shaped; it sits 1.3 m (4.3 ft) above the adyton platform paving and was once framed by an edicule surmounted by a low arch. The front of the edicule was supported by two colonnettes with small Corinthian capitals, one of which was found reused in the Byzantine church. The western outer facing of the walls is adorned with corner pilasters.

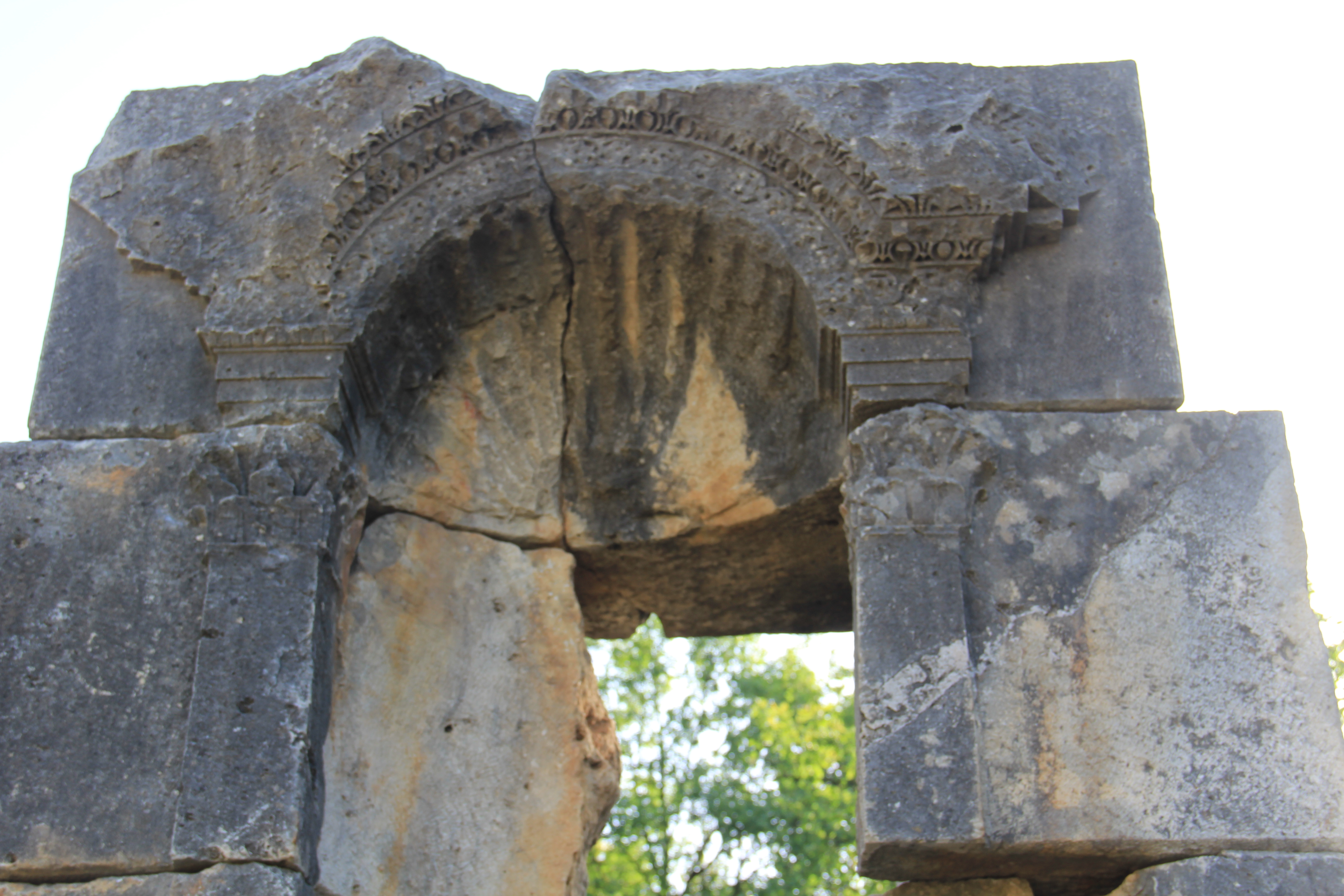
Niche in the adyton (innermost sanctuary) of the temple

The temple displays a systematic use of proportional ratios, enabling a complete virtual reconstruction of its elevations. The Great Temple incorporates Roman architectural elements, namely its podium, Corinthian order, the regularity of its proportions, and its tetrastyle prostyle front, with distinct local features, most notably the adyton with its central niche, and the two exceptional lateral windows. In Christian times, the Great Temple was converted into a church, and an apse was built into the temple's pronaos. The eastern façade and adyton platform were dismantled between the fifth and eighth centuries AD. By the seventh or eighth centuries, an unidentified structure was added to its side. The temple's conversion into a church was completed by the 12th century AD. This church had fallen into disrepair by the time it was described by Krencker and Zschietzschmann in 1938. The temenos portico was completely dismantled during the Byzantine and medieval periods, making way for an artisanal sector with an oil mill and ovens located to the west, behind the Great Temple. These artisanal installations also extended further to the south, near the early Byzantine period Christian basilica built outside the great temple's temenos.

=== The early Byzantine period basilica ===
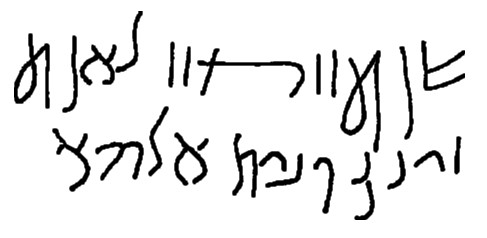
The inscription reads: šnt 203 lʾnt(...?]) zy bnw byt ʾlhʾ (+?

The early Byzantine period basilica underwent three major modifications between the early Byzantine and medieval periods. The initial structure was a three-aisled, columned basilica built around the end of the fifth century AD. It had a trapezoidal plan, featuring a semi-circular protruding apse oriented to the east, and two lateral aisles terminating in straight walls at the east. The southern wall of the peribolos of the Great Temple was partially repurposed as the basilica's northern wall. This first basilica was built with columns repurposed from the dismantled great temple's temenos portico. It had two rows of five columns spaced 1.6 m (5.2 ft) apart, supporting semicircular arches. Access to the basilica was provided by two doorways in the western wall. The primary entrance, which opened onto the nave (the central section of the church), was preceded by a two-column portico.

In the seventh century AD, following a period of destruction, a second basilica featuring pillars replaced the earlier structure. During this period, the temple's monumental altar was leveled, and its base was integrated into the paved courtyard west of the church. The Hellenistic cultic platform was repurposed to house a basin, and the basilica's courtyard pavement covered its former staircase. Structures northwest of the main temple and on the site of the sanctuary's western portico may have held monastic functions. The aisles were extended to the east by the construction of a wall that encompassed part of the original apse, the columns were replaced by pillars, and the choir was pierced laterally by two small doorways leading to the side aisles. The entrance portico was transformed into a narthex (a vestibule separating the church interior from the outside), accessed from the south via a small staircase with five steps.

In the third phase of occupation during the medieval era, the orientation of the main entrance to the pillared basilica was changed to the south with the closing of the central door on the basilica's west side. A new door was opened in the south wall. The actual ruins of the basilica correspond to this third phase of modifications. The surviving structure consists of a three-nave main building with a narthex to the west. It has a roughly trapezoidal layout: the northern and southern walls measure 23 m (75 ft) and 20.75 m (68.1 ft), respectively, while its width ranges from 12.55 m (41.2 ft) to 13.95 m (45.8 ft). The wall thickness also varies, with the north and east walls averaging 1.1 m (3.6 ft) and the south and west walls measuring 0.9 m (3.0 ft). This basilica was abandoned in the second half of the 13th century.

=== The northern chapel ===
A small Christian chapel stood approximately 3 metres (9.8 feet) north of and parallel to the Great Temple. The chapel consisted of a single nave and measured 9.3 m × 5.2 m (31 ft × 17 ft). The nave ended in the east with a protruding semicircular apse. The chapel was built using small stone blocks with minimal reuse of ancient materials. This chapel was accessed through a single doorway, positioned centrally in the western wall. The doorposts are composed of two large monolithic blocks reused from earlier structures. The nave, characterized by walls approximately 1.10 meters thick, was likely covered by a barrel vault.

== Archaeological study ==
=== Building proportions ===
The Great Temple was designed using a regulating grid of 3.6 m (12 ft), which was split into ten modules measuring 0.36 m (14 in) each, corresponding to the column shaft radius. This grid governed both the plan and elevations, with proportions following Corinthian order principles. The cella's layout adheres to this grid, divided into three sections, while the facade columns (6.00 m tall, ~16.67 modules) and entablature (1.45 m, four modules) reflect modular harmony. The Small Temple was a scaled-down version of the large temple, built at half its size, and the temenos portico likely followed a 20-module column height (5.20 m). Key elements, such as intercolumniations (2.40–3.15 m), column diameters (0.72 m, two modules), and antae widths (0.72 m), confirm the pervasive use of the 0.36 m module.

| Element | Measurement (m) | Module Equivalent |
|---|---|---|
The Grand Temple
| Base module equals radius of the column shaft | 0.36 | 1 module |
| Column shaft diameter | 0.72 | 2 modules |
| Entablature height | 1.45 | 4 modules |
| Cella regular grid | 3.60 | 10 modules |
| Cella width | 7.20 | 20 modules |
| Cella length | 10.80 | 30 modules |
| Adyton platform | 7.10 x 3.60 | ~20 x 10 modules |
| Architrave height | 0.54 | 1.5 modules |
| Side window-doors | 1.20 x 2.40 | 3.33 x 6.67 modules |
| Facade column height | 6.00 | 16.67 modules |
| Capital height | 0.86 | 2.39 modules |
The Small Temple
| Pilaster width | 0.37 | ~1 module |
| Wall width | 0.48 | 1.33 modules |
| Temple footprint length | 7.2 | 20 modules |
| Cella side | 2.76 | 7.67 modules |

=== Finds ===
An altar fragment decorated with a relief carving of a veiled goddess (discussed in the Function and dedication section) was discovered reused in a small wall at the southern extremity of the survey site. Coins from the first century AD struck at Byblos were found at the site, as well as coins from the eighth century AD. Hellenistic-era ceramic ware, ceramics from the 12th to 13th centuries AD, and a tomb of a child from the late medieval period were found in the artisanal sector. Small ossuary tombs containing children's bones were discovered in shallow pits carved into the stair treads of the basilica narthex. The tombs contained a jeton (token) from the 15th century, a cut medieval coin with a square shape, and several small pieces of jewelry such as earrings and bracelets dated approximately to the 14th–16th centuries AD.

A number of unmarked arched stelae, possibly funerary monuments, and at least one confirmed tombstone from the mid-third century suggest the presence of a Roman necropolis around the temple site. A funerary column found in nearby Qartaba, dated between 120 and 160 AD, belonged to the family tomb of a priest likely associated with a local sacred site. Its Greek inscriptions preserve names of Semitic and Latin origin, while the monument itself adopts Roman funerary conventions; Gatier interpreted these features in the context of the region's integration into the Roman world and the adoption of Greco-Roman cultural forms by local elites.

== Function and dedication ==
The deity venerated in the Hellenistic-era structure cannot be established, since the Aramaic dedicatory formula employed, "house of the god(s)" offers only a generic designation rather than a specific theonym. The titulary deity of the Roman temple is likewise unidentified due to the absence of inscriptions. Gatier has discussed a relief known as the "Lady of Yanouh", in connection with Venus lugens ("mourning Venus") mentioned by Macrobius. The relief depicts a veiled female figure accompanied by lions. Gatier compared the figure with goddesses worshipped at Byblos and Arqa, and suggested a possible identification with the Aphrodite of Aphaca. Such imagery supports the claim by Philo of Byblos that Phoenician cities and villages shared common myths. The accompanying lions, however, also have parallels in representations of Atargatis (a West Semitic mother-goddess) and Allat (an Arabian pre-Islamic goddess). Gatier has suggested that this figure may correspond to the Aphrodite of Aphaca and that the Ituraeans, who controlled the region in the first century AD, may have facilitated the spread of her cult to Arqa. Additionally, the reference to the goddess Libanitis in Lucian's satire Adversus Indoctum could be relevant to the sanctuary at Aphaca and the Adonis myth, as later glosses clarify that she represents Aphrodite, the lover of Adonis, who spent time with him on Mount Lebanon.

In the Byzantine period, Yanouh became a Christian center. The site is explicitly mentioned in a papal bull issued by Pope Innocent III on 3 January 1215, which states that the seat of the patriarch is found in the church of the Virgin at Yanoch. Yanouh served as the seat of the Maronite patriarchate from 750 to 1277 AD, in which time the converted large temple was dedicated to Saint George, and another church was built in the north of the site, along with several chapels in the vicinity.

== Gallery ==
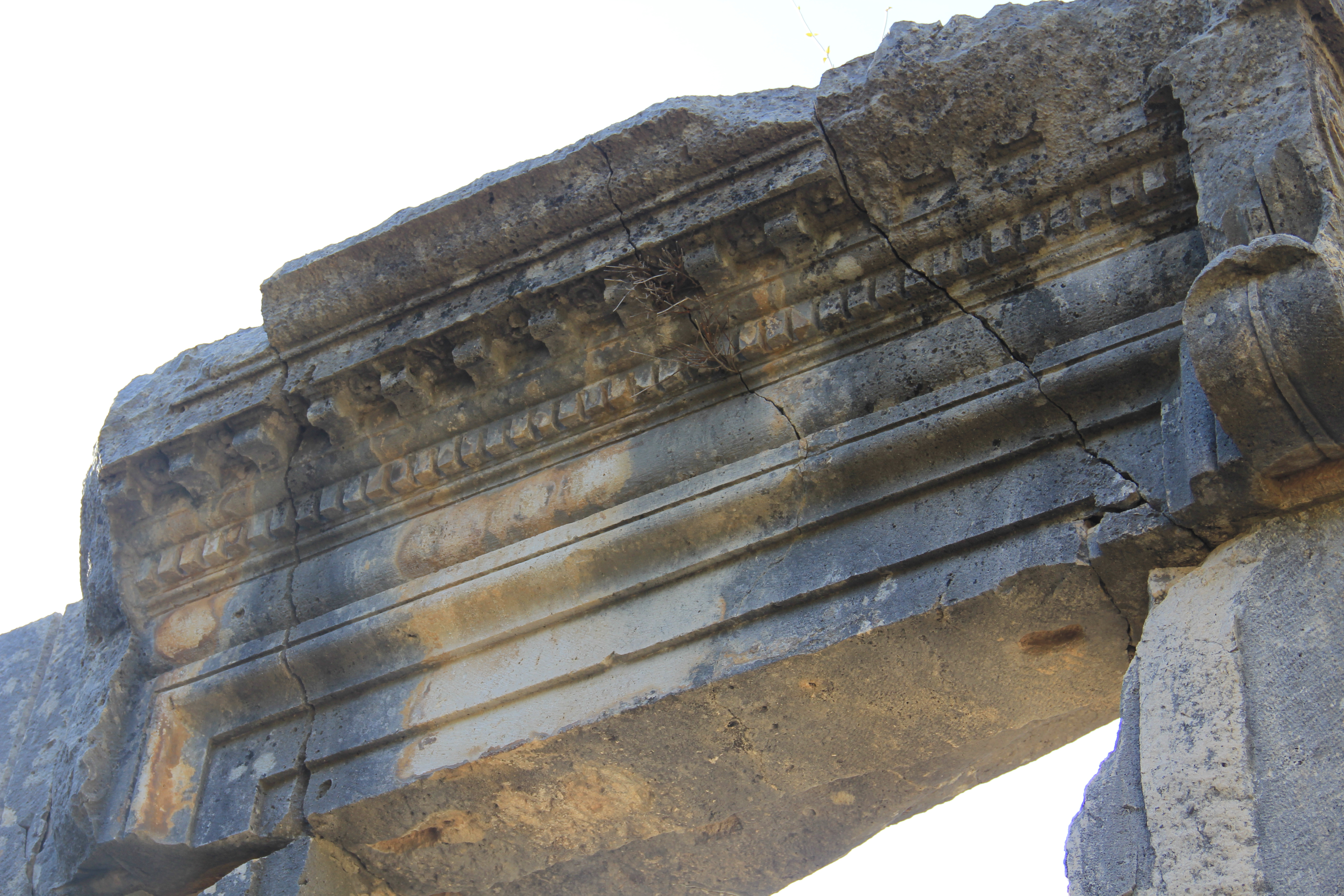
Close-up of the cella window architrave

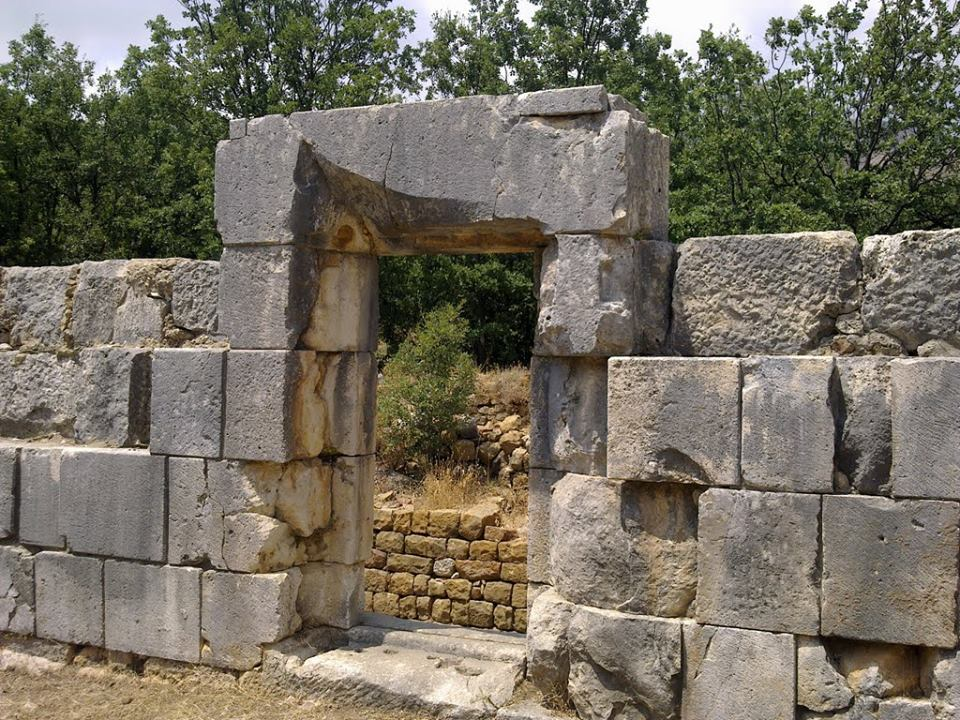
Cella window architrave viewed from inside the cella

== See also ==
- Law school of Berytus – Ancient school of Roman law, to 551 AD
- Phoenician sanctuary of Kharayeb – Historic temple remains in Lebanon
- Roman temple of Bziza – Cultural heritage building in Bziza, Lebanon
- Tower of Qalaat Faqra – Roman-period tower in Mount Lebanon
