= Ghanem =

Ghanem (Arabic: غانم) is an Arabic masculine given name and a surname. The surname is especially prevalent in the Levant.

"Ghanem" may refer to:

== Given name ==
- Ghanem al-Dosari (born 1980), Saudi human rights activist and satirist
- Ghanem Hamarsheh (born 1977), Jordanian footballer
- Ghanem Zrelly (born 1984), Tunisian actor

== Surname ==
- Abdullah Ghanem (born 1995), Emirati footballer
- Abu Samra Ghanem (1820–1895), right hand of Tanyus Shahin, leader of the Mount Lebanon peasants' revolt of 1859
- Antoine Ghanem (1943–2007), Lebanese politician
- Ali Ghanem (born 1963), Syrian politician and Minister of Petroleum and Mineral Resources
- Asma Ghanem (born 1991), Palestinian artist and musician
- Donia Samir Ghanem (born 1985), Egyptian singer and actress
- Edy Ganem (born 1983), American actress of Lebanese descent
- Iskandar Ghanem (1911–2005), Lebanese army general
- Marcel Ghanem (born 1964), Lebanese journalist
- Mohamed El Ghanem, Egyptian refugee detained without charge for seven years by the Geneva judiciary from 2007 to 2013
- Najwa Ghanem (born 1960), Syrian first wife and first cousin of Osama bin Laden
- Nassir Al-Ghanem (born 1961), Kuwaiti footballer
- Nujoom Al-Ghanem (born 1962), Emirati poet, artist and film director
- Robert Ghanem (1942–2019), Lebanese lawyer and politician
- Sabine Ghanem (born 1984), Swiss-Lebanese jewelry designer and socialite
- Samir Ghanem (1937–2021), Egyptian comedian
- Saoud Ghanem (born 1981), Kuwaiti-born Qatari footballer
- Shihab Ghanem (born 1940), Emirati engineer, administrator, poet and author
- Shukri Ghanem (1942–2012), Libyan politician, prime minister

== See also ==
- Ganem, a given name and surname
