= Haroutune Kalayan =

Armenian-Lebanese archaeologist

Haroutune Kalayan (June 2, 1908 – December 21, 2003) was an Armenian-Lebanese archaeologist and engineer known for his contributions to the preservation and restoration of ancient sites in the Middle East.

== Early life and education ==
Kalayan was born in 1908 in Aintab, Türkiye. In 1915, during the Armenian genocide, his older brother and father were massacred, forcing him to move with his mother and brother to Aleppo in Syria. He attended Aleppo College. Later, he enrolled at the American University of Beirut where he graduated with a Bachelor of Science in Engineering in 1946.

== Career ==
In 1937, Kalayan married Berjouhie Shirajian and moved to Cyprus, where he taught at the Melkonian College for several years. After Lebanon gained its independence, he returned to Beirut and was the chief engineer of the Lebanese Department of Antiquities. Concurrently, he taught part-time at AUB’s Faculty of Engineering and Architecture. Kalayan is known for his restoration work on ancient ruins in Lebanon. His efforts were recognized with the Said Akl Award. In 1978, Kalayan moved to Jordan and worked with its Department of Antiquities until his retirement in 1989. Post-retirement, he relocated to the United States to live with his children.

== Selected publications ==
- Kalayan, Haroutune (1988). The Architectural Information Through Symmetry. Hashemite Kingdom of Jordan, Department of Antiquities.
- Kalayan, Haroutune Y.; Liger-Belair (architecte), Jacques (1966). L'habitation au Liban: essai de classification. première partie (in French). Association pour la protection des sites et anciennes demeures.
- Kalayan, Haroutune (1975). The Symmetry and Proportion of Armenian Architecture. Shoushan.
- Kalayan, Haratoune (1968). A New Outlook Into the History of Architecture Through the Tools Used as Schools of Masonry. Al-Mouhandess.
