= Ghineh =

Ghineh غينه
- City
- Location in Lebanon
- Coordinates: 34°2′19″N 35°42′34″E
- Country: Lebanon
- Governorate: Keserwan-Jbeil
- District: Keserwan

Area
  - Total: 1.99 km^{2} (0.77 sq mi)
- Elevation: 950 m (3,120 ft)
- Time zone: UTC+2 (EET)
  - Summer (DST): UTC+3 (EEST)
- Dialing code: +961

Ghineh (Levantine Arabic: غينه, romanized: Ghīneh) is a municipality in the Keserwan District of the Keserwan-Jbeil Governorate in Lebanon. It is located 36 kilometers north of Beirut. Its average elevation is 950 meters above sea level and its total land area is 199 hectares. Ghineh's inhabitants are predominantly Maronite Christians.

== History ==
Ghineh is famous for its Phoenician, Roman and Byzantine antiquities, notably the 5th century Kabaal Old Church built on the remains of a Phoenician temple dedicated to Greek mythology figure Adonis (from Arabic قبر بعل, meaning the tomb of the God Baal). Historian Ernest Renan claims that a rock carved nearby, known locally as the Rock of Adonis, depicts the death of Adonis who was killed by a boar. According to the legend, Ares turned himself into a boar to avenge his honor, as he was promised to Aphrodite, who fell in love with the mortal Adonis, said to have been of immense beauty. The scene also depicts Aphrodite weeping over the body of her lover. The graves carved within the rocks led locals to believe it was the burial site of Adonis, who was killed in the nearby Afqa waterfall, where the water continues to flow until the Adonis River in Keserwan, which was later renamed to become the Ibrahim River. According to Greco-Roman folklore, in every spring, and at the same time Adonis was killed, snow melts and brings red clay to the river from the mountain slopes. The legend says that this is Adonis's blood, which is renewed every year, at the time of his killing. Also in the fertile valley surrounding the river, millions of anemone flowers emerge every year on the anniversary of his death during spring. The flowers were known as Adonis Flowers, representing the blood of Adonis mingled with Aphrodite's tears.

The region was later occupied by the Maronites who enjoyed a degree of independence under the Crusaders, and this, until its destruction at the hands of the Mamluks in 1307. It was then abandoned for the next three centuries until Christian families arrived somewhere during the 17th century.
