= Yanouh, Byblos =

Yanouh يانوح Tell Yanouh, Kharayeb, Yenouh, Anoch, Ianosh
- Municipality
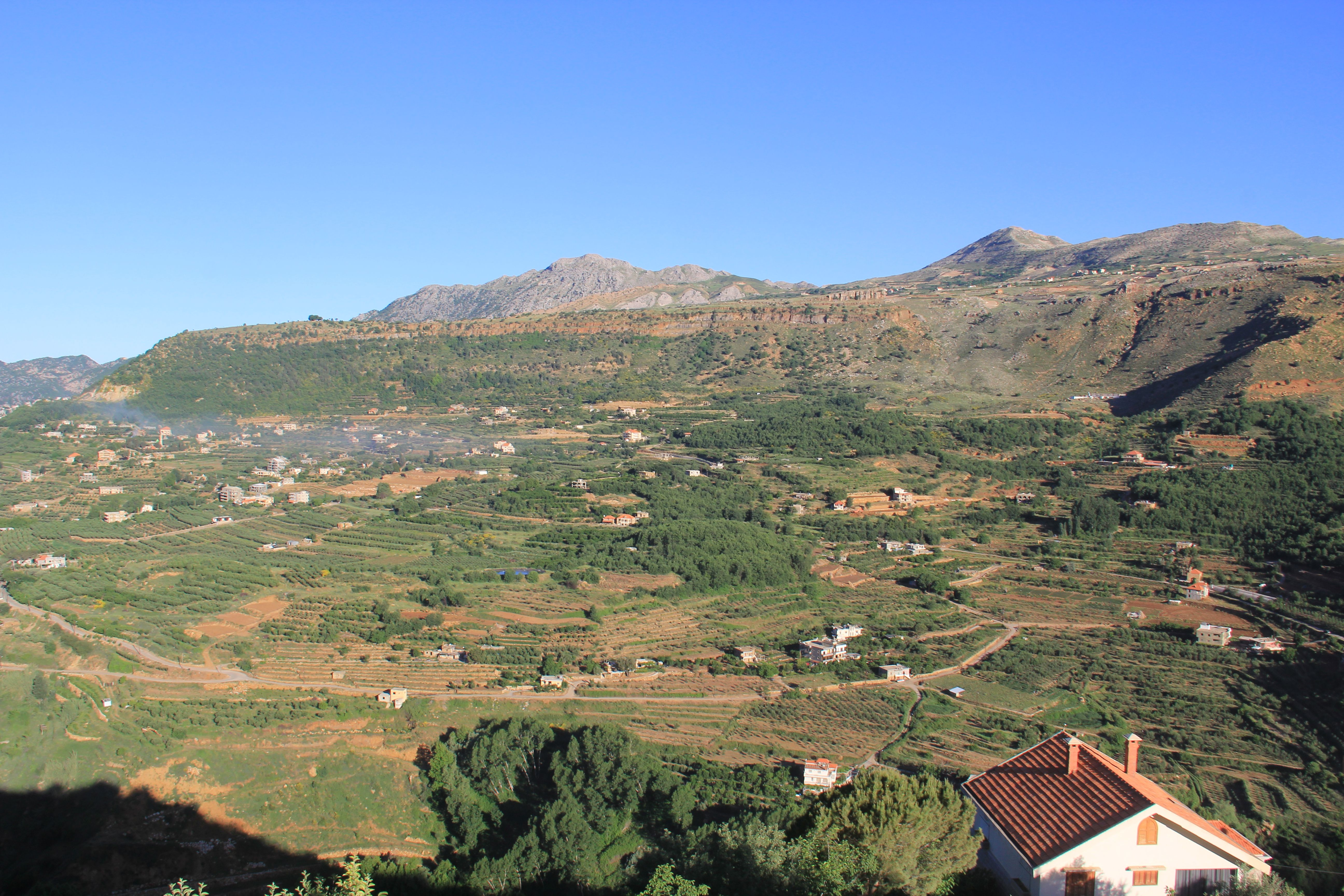

- Location in Lebanon
- Coordinates: 34°6′2.1″N 35°53′2.53″E
- Country: Lebanon
- Governorate: Keserwan-Jbeil
- District: Byblos

Area
  - Total: 1.47 km^{2} (0.57 sq mi)
- Elevation: 1,120 m (3,670 ft)
- Time zone: UTC+2 (EET)
  - Summer (DST): +3

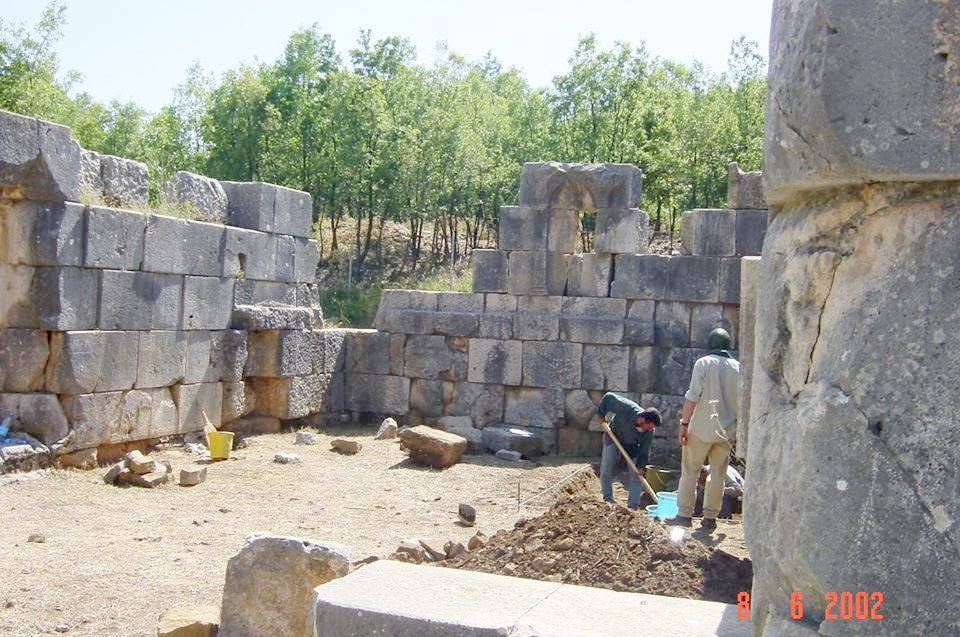
Excavation work at the sanctuary of Yanouh during the 1999-2004 USJ archeological mission

Yanouh (Arabic: يانوح, romanized: Yānūḥ) is a village and municipality in the Byblos District of the Keserwan-Jbeil Governorate, Lebanon. It is located 94 kilometers north of Beirut. Yanouh's inhabitants are predominantly Maronite Catholics. Its average elevation is 1,120 meters above sea level and its total land area is 147 hectares. Yanouh stands on the slopes of Joubbat El Mnaitra, five miles east of Qartaba, on the right bank high up in the ravine carved out by the Adonis River, now known as Nahr Ibrahim.

Yanouh, once a Phoenician center, is half-way between Byblos and Heliopolis (Baalbek), around 20 km as the crow flies from the Mediterranean Sea.

Yanouh is known for its 2nd century CE Roman temple, its Byzantine basilica and medieval chapel. In 750 AD, at the time of the fifth Maronite patriarch, John Maron II, then installed in Yanouh, the Roman temple was converted into a church consecrated to Saint George. Between 750 and 1277, twenty-three successors of Patriarch John Maroun resided there; under the Crusades, the number of Yanouh's inhabitants had risen to 3500, while the churches numbered more than thirty-five. Yanouh is also notable for its Hellenistic cult building containing the earliest Aramaic inscription found in Lebanon.

== Families ==
The families native to Yanouh are Ghanem, Ephrem, Bahout, Bardawil, Beaini, Hawat, Dagher, Souaid, Assaker, Maroun, Nohra, Zaaiter and Zeid.

== History ==
The earliest remains at Tell el Kharayeb (“Hill of Ruins”) in Yanouh date back to the third millennium BC; these include a town of about 150 metres (490 ft) in diameter, surrounded by a defensive wall and a lower urban quarter extending towards the south of the site. Surrounding the hill are a number of rectangular underground tombs with walls built of carefully hewn parallelepiped blocks. From the 12th to the 4th century BC the site witnessed significant agricultural and domestic development as manifested by archaeological artifacts found on site. During an archeological survey in the early 2000s, remnants of religious sandstone building from the second half of the 2nd century BC were uncovered along with an Aramaic inscription belonging to the same Hellenistic period. The inscription is notable for being the earliest known Aramaic writing to be found on Lebanese soil; it mentions a “House of God” and was dated to around 110-109 BC. In the first century AD, a small roman temple was annexed to the east of the Hellenistic religious structure and a grand temple, complete with a temenos and columned portico, was built to its north. The small temple was, like the earlier Hellenistic structure, oriented to the south. The Great Temple and its temenos were oriented on an east–west axis, with the access pointing eastward. Both small temple and great temples were built with contrasting blue-gray limestone, which gave the temple the local appellation of Mar Girios al-Azrak (Saint George the Blue), since the structure was reused as a Christian church dedicated to the Saint. The titulary deity of the Roman sanctuary remains unidentified due to the absence of inscriptions. In the Byzantine Period, between the 4th and 7th centuries CE, the portico of the Great Temple was torn down. A Christian basilica with columns was built towards the end of the 5th century. During the first half of the 7th century a fire destroyed much of the buildings and reconstruction and rearrangement immediately followed; the basilica with columns was replaced by one with pillars. The whole site was transformed into a monastery.

The Christians of Yanouh enjoyed quiet and prosperity even under Umayyad rule. Under the harsh Abbasid domination, between the 8th and 9th centuries, the site was totally abandoned, only to be repopulated under the Crusaders between the 10th and 13th centuries where inhabitants numbered 3500. During this time a chapel was built to the north of the Great Roman temple, which was itself turned into a church; the basilica was reshaped with access from the south side and thirty-five chapels were added to form a monastery complex. During this period, more land was cleared for agriculture and village dwellings appeared on the tell. The whole site became a monastery named The Virgin of Ianosh (Anoch) and became with Patriarch Yuhanna in 938 the patriarchal seat of the Maronite Church until the mid-13th century. Between 1215 and 1246, two papal bulls mentioned the seat of the patriarchs as being the Church of the Virgin of Ianosh.

In 1276, under Mameluke persecution, the Maronite Patriarchate moved from Yanouh to Saint Ilige in the village of Mayfouq. In the 15th century Yanouh and its surroundings were occupied by Shiites. In 1534 war waged between Kaisites and Yamanites in Joubbat El Mneitra and a great many inhabitants left. The monastery and village of Yanouh were deserted once again and the area described by Patriarch Estephan El Douaihy as a desert.

== Geography ==
Yanouh is situated at Joubbat El Mneitra, 5 km east of Qartaba, on the right bank of the upper valley of the Adonis river. It is 33 km driving distance east of Byblos, and 60 km from the capital city Beirut.

== Gallery ==
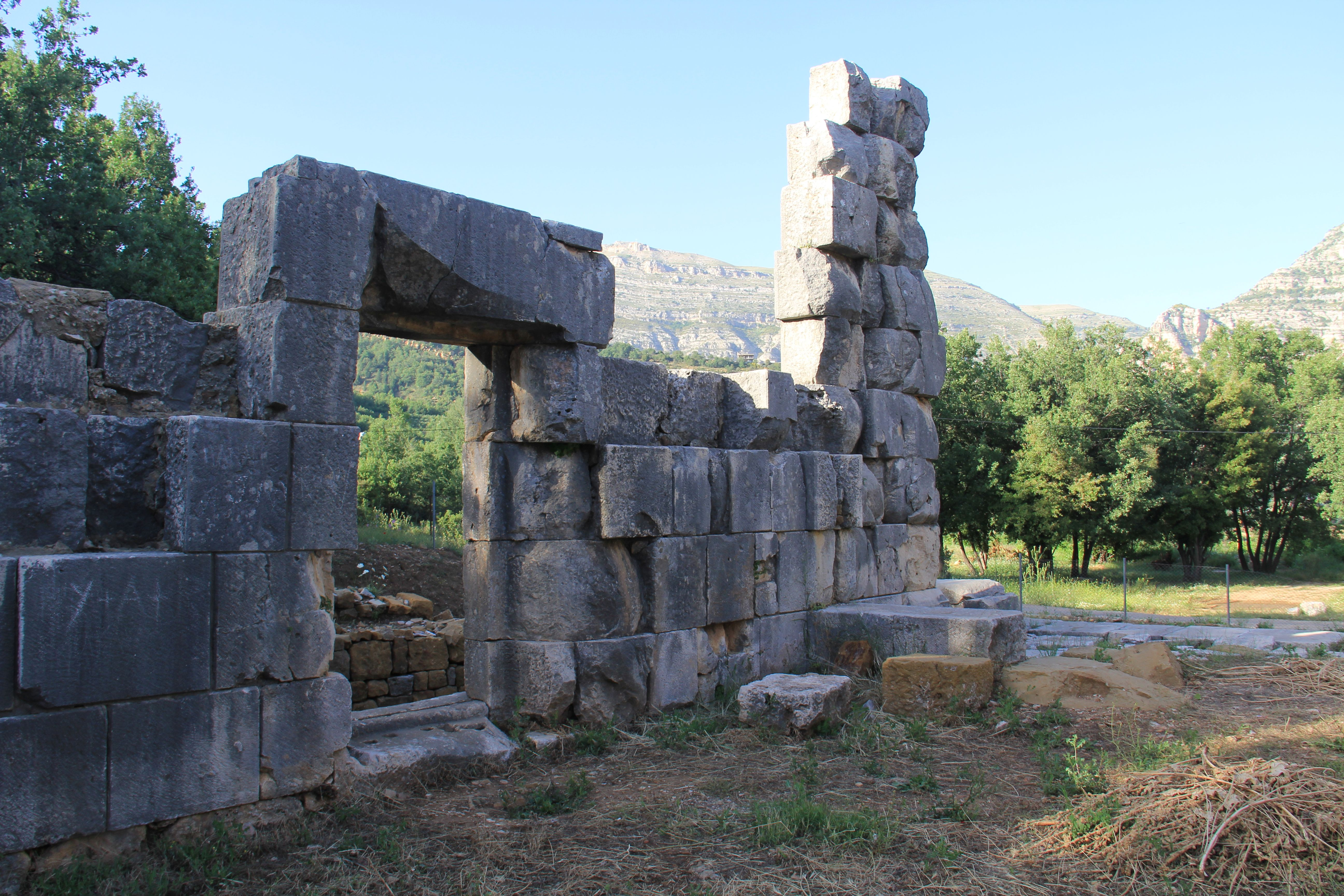
The grand temple of Yanouh from within

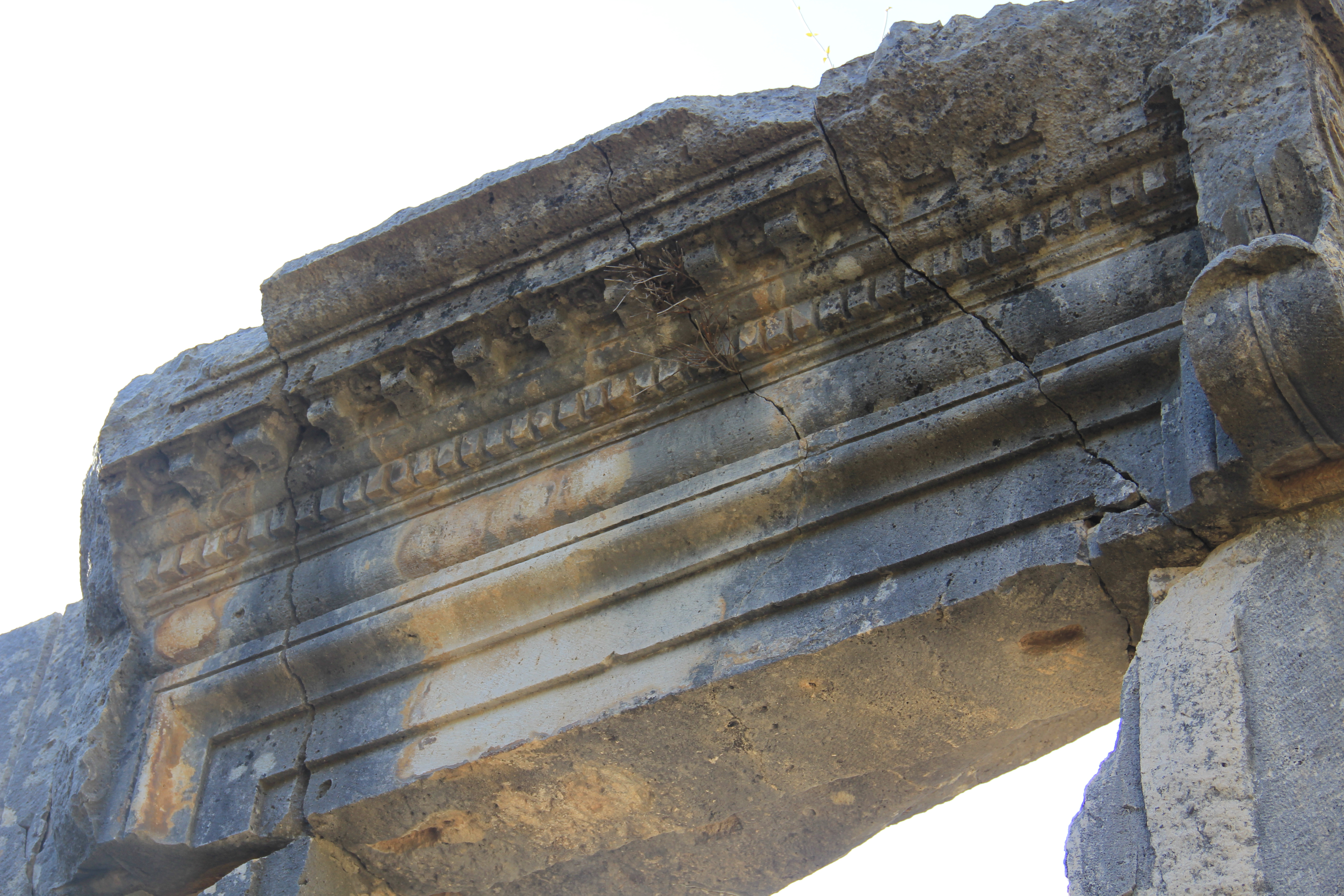
Door-window decorations of the grand temple

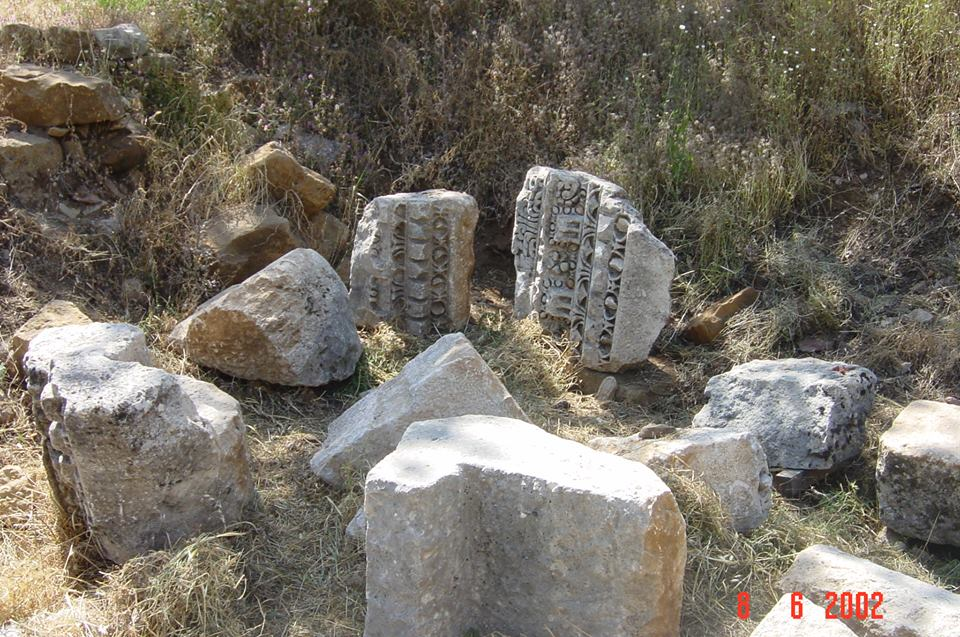
Grand temple capital remains and decorative elements

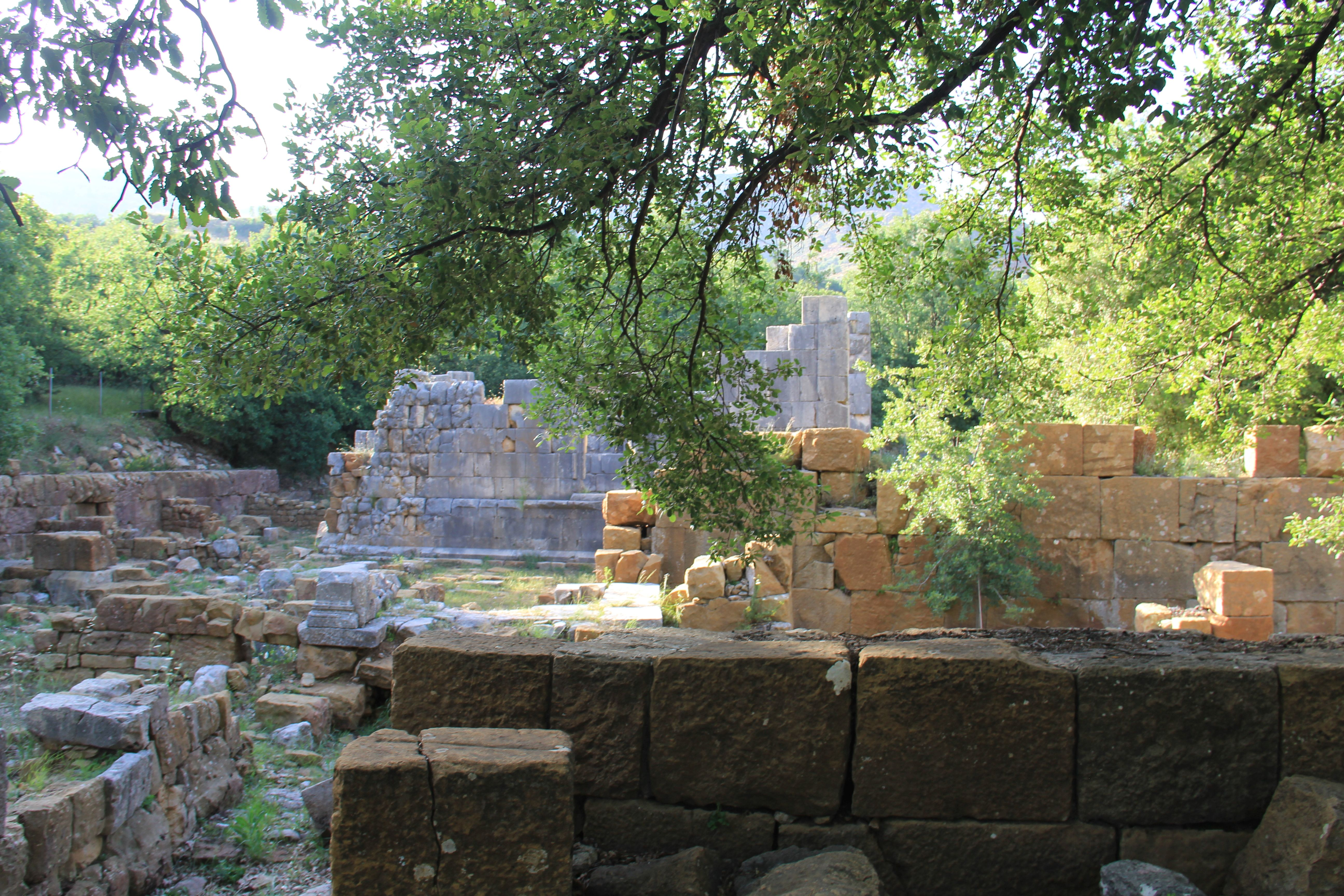
The temenos wall (yellow) and the grand temple in the background

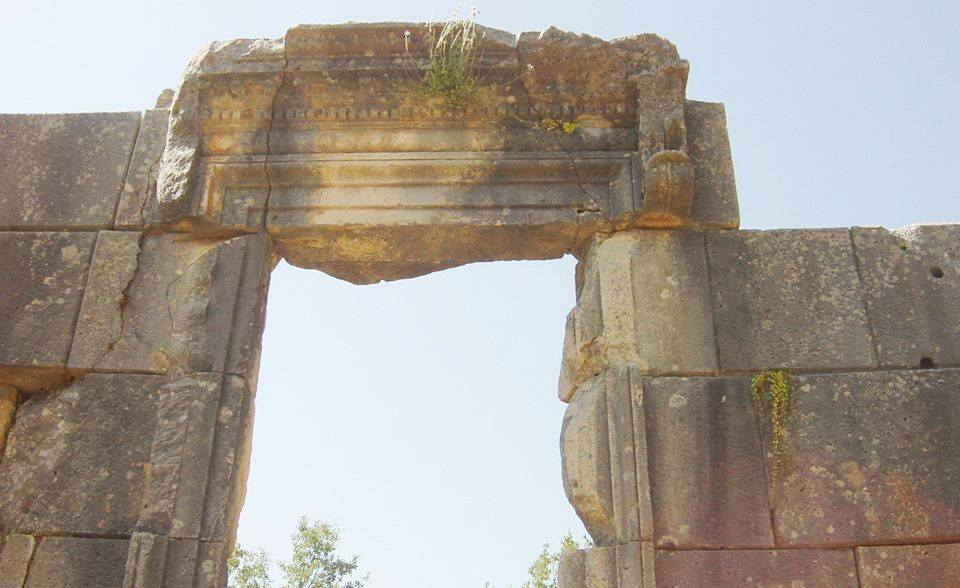
Ornate lateral windows of the grand temple

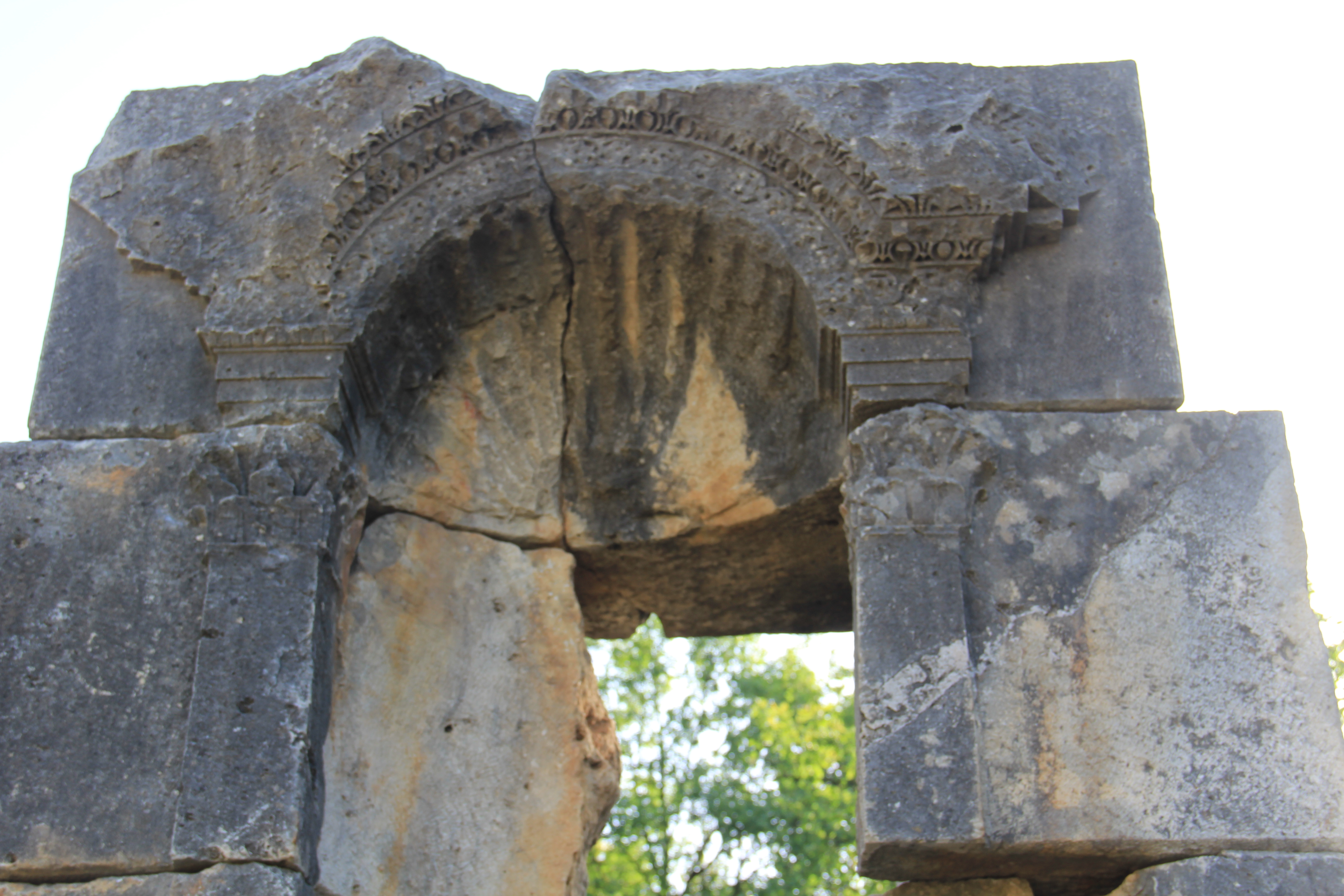
The adyton niche of the grand temple

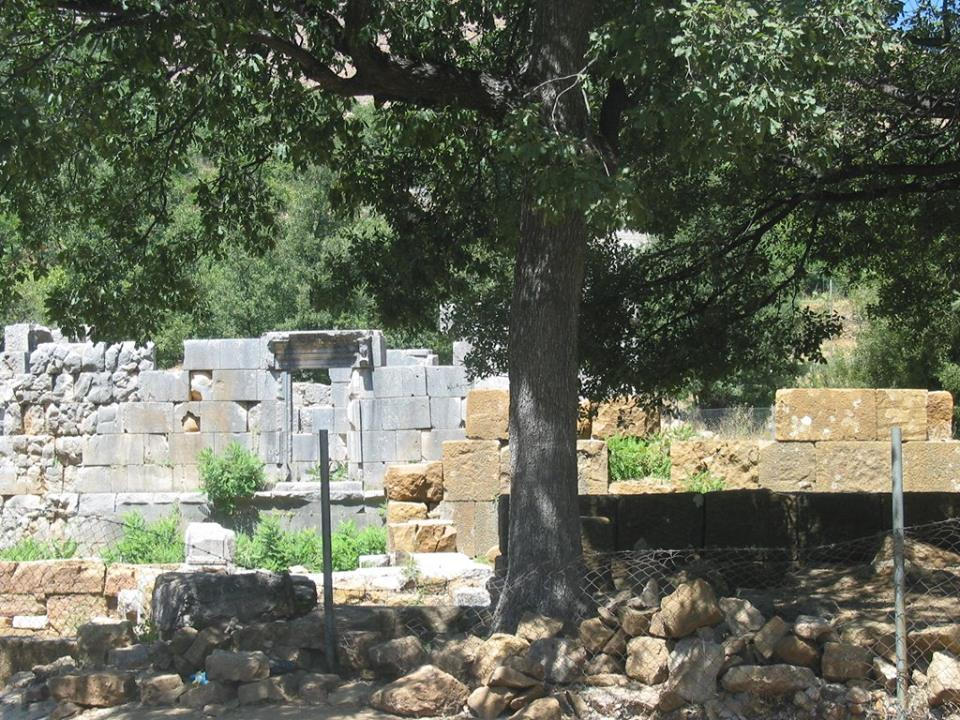
General view of the site

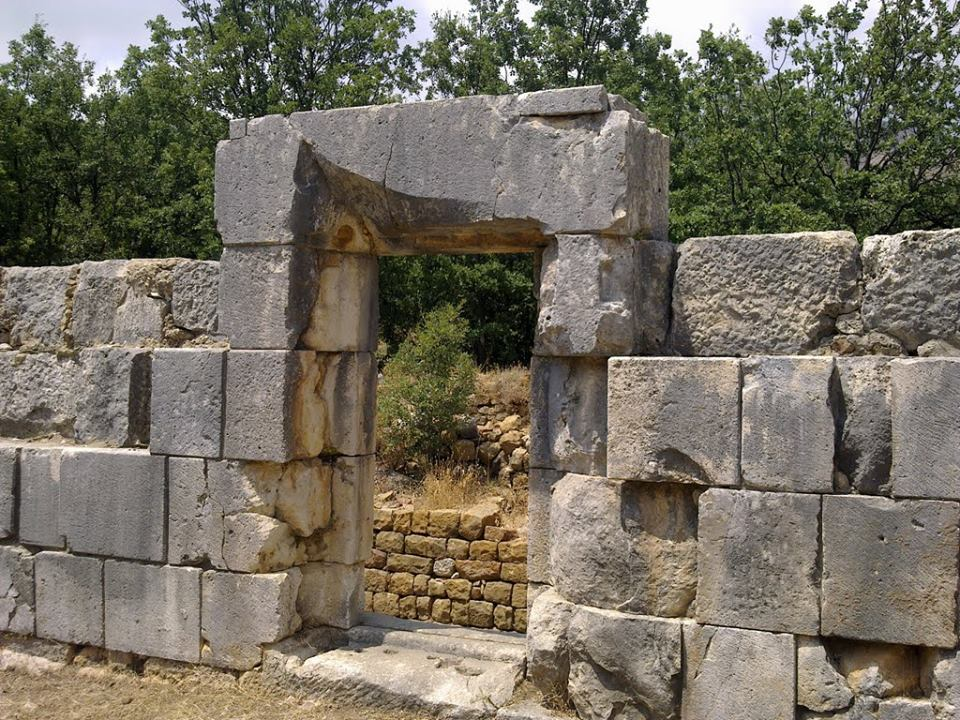
The temple is also called Mar Girios el Azrak as a church was once installed in the temple ruins.

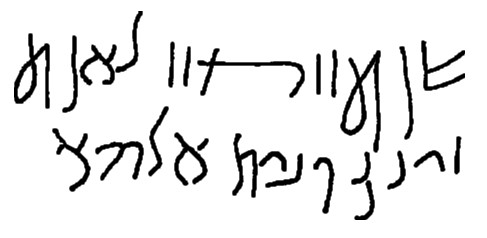
Epigraphic dawning of the Aramaic inscription of Yanouh, the first attested use of Aramaic as a public language in Mount Lebanon.
