= Amioun =

Capital of Koura District, Lebanon

Amioun أميون
- City
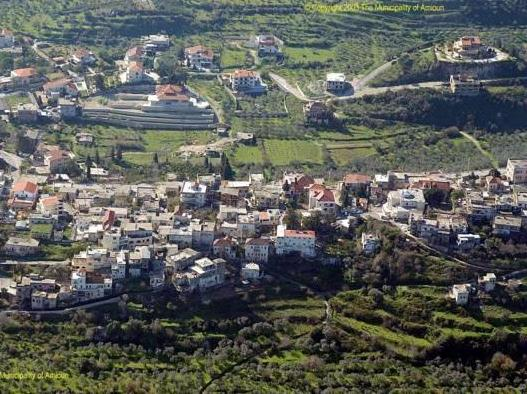

- Location within Lebanon
- Coordinates: 34°18′0″N 35°48′0″E
- Country: Lebanon
- Governorate: North Lebanon Governorate
- District: Koura District
- Established: circa 4,000 B.C.
- Founder: Phoenicians

Government
  - Type: Municipality
  - Mayor: Malek Fares

Area
  - Total: 11.4 km^{2} (4.4 sq mi)
- along the "Cedars' way"
- Highest elevation: 330 m (1,080 ft)
- Lowest elevation: 298 m (978 ft)

Population (2010)
  - Total: 10,658
  - Density: 935/km^{2} (2,420/sq mi)
  - Religion: 89.1% Greek Orthodox
- Time zone: UTC+2 (EET)
  - Summer (DST): UTC+3 (EEST)
- Dialing code: +961 6
- Website: https://visitamioun.weebly.com

Amioun (Arabic: أميون, romanized: Amyūn; Greek: Αμιούν) is the capital of the predominantly Greek Orthodox Koura District (from the Greek word χώρα (Khôra) which etymologically means "space," "place," "land," or "region") in North Lebanon. The town belongs to the Greek Orthodox Archdiocese of Tripoli and Al-Koura (Arabic: أبـرشـيّـة طـرابـلـس والكـورة وتوابعهما; Greek: Ιερά Μητρόπολις Τριπόλεως και Χώρας).

== Etymology ==
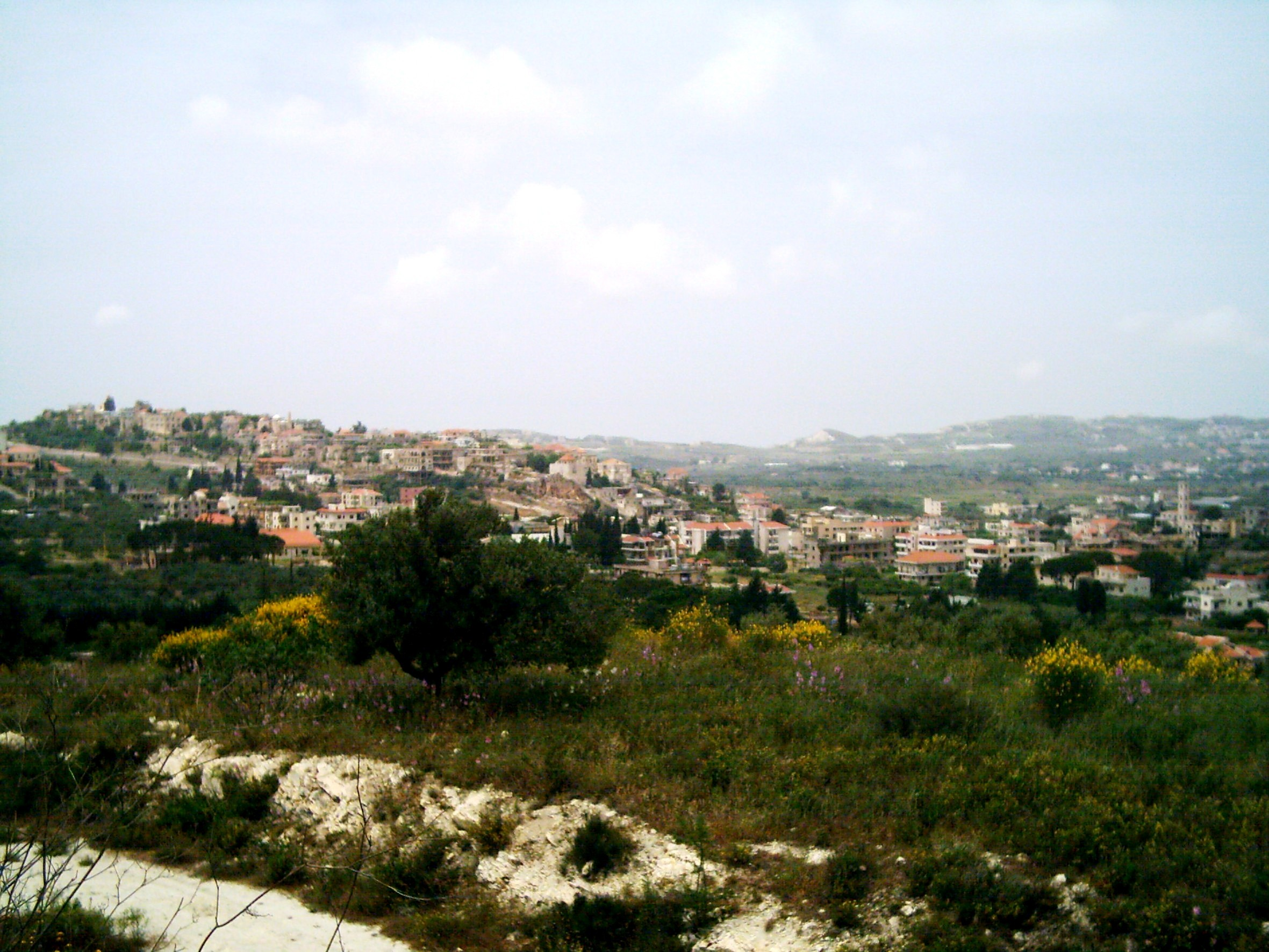
Amioun's old town on top of the cliff

Amioun is a very old settlement whose history dates back to the Paleolithic period. This is supported by the number of small caves built in the old city's rocks. The ancient Semitic people are thought to have arrived in the region around 4,000 B.C.

The town was called "Ammiya" in the 14th century B.C. A King of Ammiya appears numerous times in the letters of Tell el Amarna, particularly in ones concerning cities near Gebal. Local governors sent these 14th century B.C. letters to their overlords, the pharaohs of Egypt.

According to one theory, the modern town of Amioun possibly derives its name from the Aramaic language, meaning "'am Yawan" "Greek people" indicating a place inhabited by Greeks.

According to another hypothesis, Anis Freiha has argued that a possible root is the Semitic word emun, meaning strong, invincible and fortified.

== Geography ==
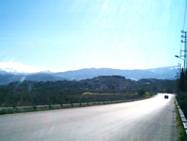
Amioun highway

Located in the heart of Northern Lebanon, Amioun is the administrative center of Koura District. Amioun is about 370 meters (1,210 feet) above sea level and approximately 78 kilometers away (48.5 miles) north-northeast of Beirut. It is about 42 kilometers (26 miles) away from the Cedars of God and 18 kilometers (11 miles) away from Tripoli, capital of the North Governorate.

Amioun can be reached via the highway that passes through Byblos, Batroun, Chekka, and Kfarhazir. It can also be reached from Tripoli by way of Bohssas, Dahr-al-Ain, Aaba, and Bishmizzine.

The modern town of Amioun lies on an important archaeological tell. Of major interest are the churches of Mar Jurius (St. George), built on the cellar of a Roman temple, and Mar Fauqa, or St. Phocas, built by local architects during the Crusader period. The entire interior of St. Phocas is covered with Byzantine-style wall paintings of the 12th and 13th centuries. A third church is the modern red-roofed Mar Youhanna (St. John) perched on a rocky cliff with tomb openings on its southeastern facade. Near the old town government building, or "Serail," is the Chapel of Marina, an ancient burial vault converted into a chapel.

== Demographics ==
Amioun had a population of 2,673 in 1953.

In 2009, Amioun had 7,011 registered voters (people above the age of 21).

In 2010, Amioun had a resident population of 10,658. Almost all the residents are followers of the Greek Orthodox Church of Antioch. Amioun is the largest Greek Orthodox town in Lebanon along with Rahbeh in Akkar, and 4th-largest in all of the Levant after Mhardeh, Al-Suqaylabiyah and Kafr Buhum (all in Syria).

In 2014, Christians made up 97.54% of the 6,790 registered voters (people above the age of 21) in Amioun. 89.6% of the voters were Greek Orthodox.

In the 2022 Lebanese general election, 6,847 voters (people above the age of 21) were registered in Amioun. 89.1% of the voters were Greek Orthodox.

== Families ==
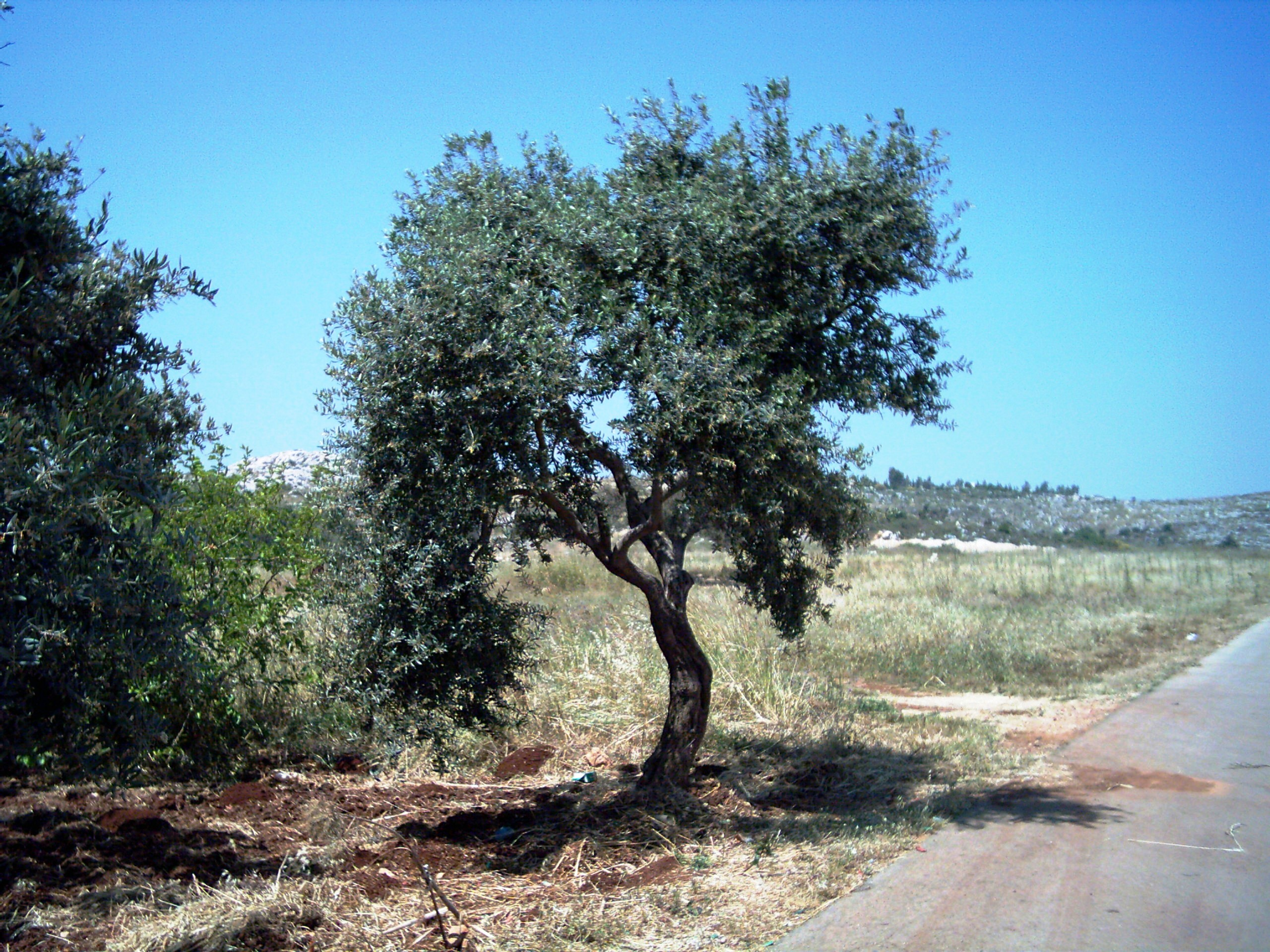
An olive tree in Amioun

Based on the 2014 electoral catalogues (people above the age of 21):

Chammas (441), Salem (282), Ghantous (227), Khouzami (221), Azar (214), Taleb (191), Saadeh (169), Nassif (158), Darazi (137), Rizk (136), Bourgi (132), Haidar (125), Makhlouta (120), Abi Chahine (116), Faysal (113), Hawi (110), Karam (110), Issa (95), Nassar (94), Daher (92), Nabbout (85), Khoury (85), Touma (80), Saoud (77), Ramadi (72), Obeid (70), Nehme (65), Deeb (62), Fares (56), Mansour (55), Yazbeck (54), Jabbour (50), Srour (49), Aboud (49), Barakat (49), Saghir (48), Roufael (47), Andraos (40), Moussa (39), Hajj Obeid (39), Badawi (36), Atiyeh (34), Saifan (32), Suleiman (31), Nasr (31), Daaboul (31), Zaidan (30), Mitri (30), Mnayyar (29), Ojaimi (28), Mekdad (28), Assaad (28), Saliba (27), Fayad (27), Semaan (26), Elias (25), Maani (24), Mikhail (23), Sarkis (22), Najjar (22), Shaheen (22), Sassine (21), Zoud (21), Younes (21), Abi Saleh (20), Tannous (20), Wehbe (19), Faraj (19), Jerges (19), Hajj (18), Saad (17), Ibrahim (17), Fadel (16), Abdo (16), Latouf (16), Habib (16), Melhem (15), Isaak (15), Ghattas (15), Yusuf (15), Farah (14), Saleh (13), Dargham (13), Kakos (13), Yacoub (12), Mahfouz (12), Tayssoun (12), Tamer (12), Sabbagh (12), Bannout (10), Haddad (10), Kaddour (10), Sawaya (10), Shehadeh (10), Saba (10), Smaili (10), Khayr (10).

== History ==
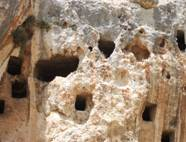
The 28 man-made crypts in the cliff

=== Bronze Age ===
The archaeological survey conducted in 2017 in Amioun by the joint Italian-Lebanese mission has revealed a remarkably long and complex settlement sequence, confirming its identification with the ancient site of Ammiya. Initially a small Early Bronze Age (EBA) rural settlement, Amioun grew significantly in the Middle Bronze Age (MBA), emerging as an urban center and eventually becoming a major political hub in the Late Bronze Age (LBA), dominating the inner Koura plain and rivaling other prominent cities of the region. This development aligns with LBA historical sources from the 16th to 13th centuries BCE.

=== Iron Age ===
The site's importance persisted into the Iron Age, as evidenced by potential Assyrian pottery finds, indicating strategic relevance during the expansion of the Assyrian Empire.

=== Classical period ===
Despite regional upheavals, Amioun/Ammiya maintained its prominence, attracting imperial interest and continuing its key role into the Classical and Medieval periods, making it a crucial site for understanding the archaeology and socio-political history of Northern Lebanon.

Amioun's past has left its mark on different historical periods, whether ancient, medieval, or modern. Some of its monuments can be traced back to a period when different pagan religions prevailed. With the advent of Christianity, the Roman pagan temples in Amioun were eventually transformed into churches.

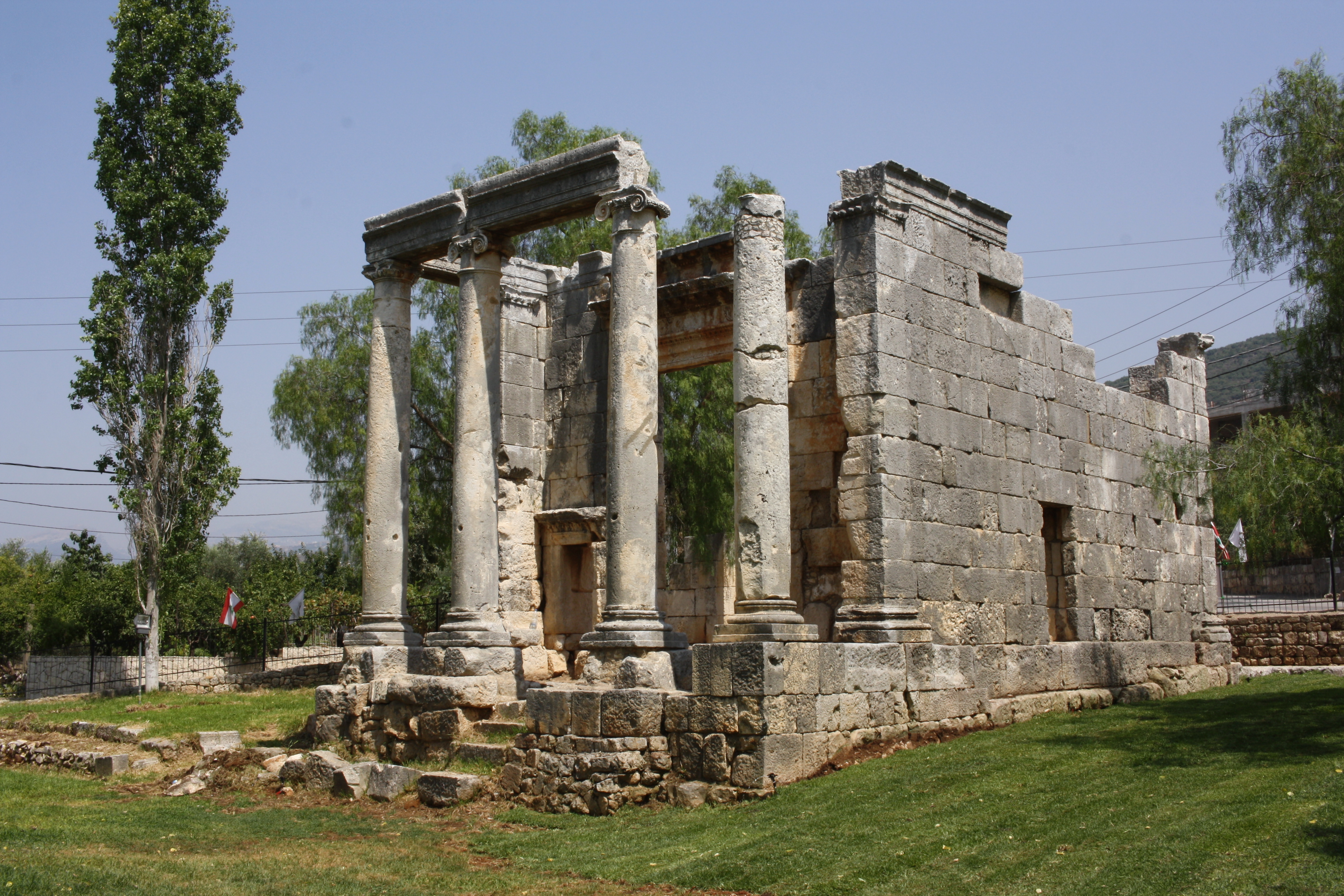
The temple of Bziza in North Lebanon in the Amioun region

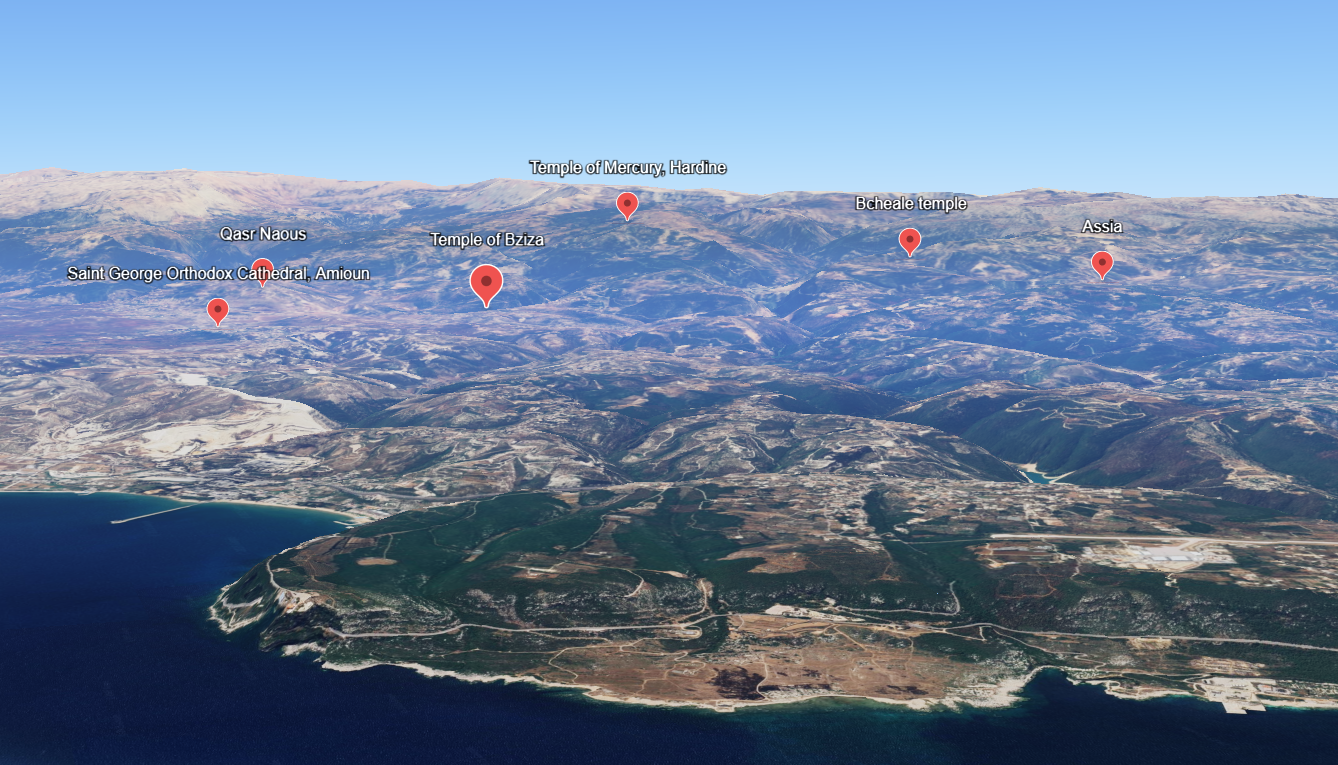
Location map of Roman temples. Within the Koura District, the map includes the Saint George Orthodox Cathedral in Amioun, the Roman Temple of Bziza and the Qasr Naous in Ain Akrine, all three of them within 6 kilometers (3.7 miles) distance from each other

The town -which grew in importance during the centuries of the Roman Phoenicia- used to be the site of a Roman temple, which was later converted into a church, dedicated to Saint George (The remains of the temple platform are still visible under a medieval monastery). The Roman temple of Bziza and the Qasr Naous in Ain Akrine, are also located nearby, 6 kilometers (3.7 miles) distance from Amioun.

=== Byzantine Era ===
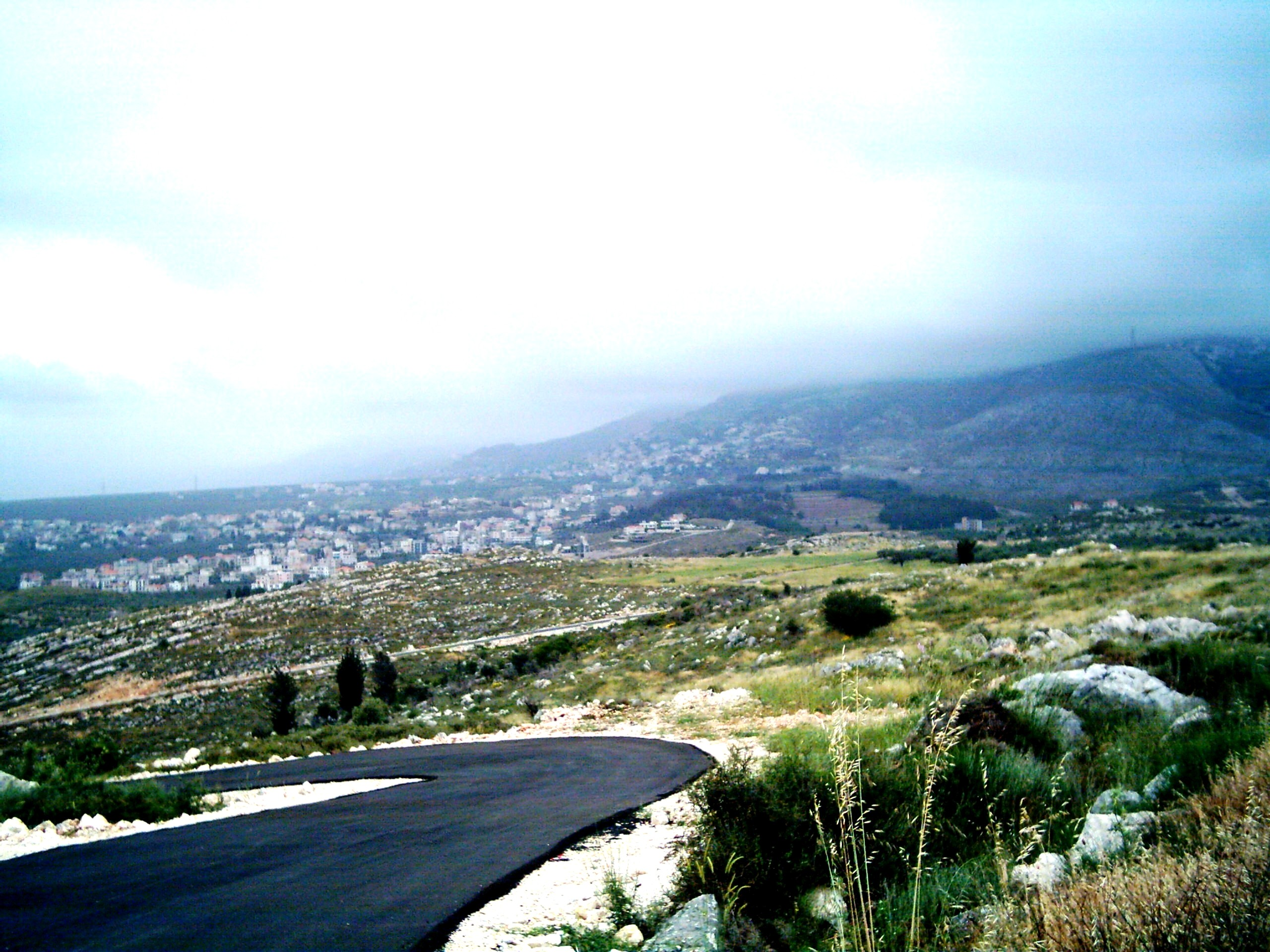
The probable place of the battle of Amioun

The Battle of Amioun occurred in 694 in Amioun, El-Koura, between Byzantine forces and Maronite and Mardaite Christians.

The seat of the Chalcedonian Patriarch of Antioch had remained vacant since 609, following the killing of the last resident patriarch. Subsequent titular patriarchs resided in Constantinople, leaving the Christians of the Levant without a local spiritual leader. In response, the monastery of Maron elected John Maron, a Maronite monk and bishop of Batroun, as Patriarch of Antioch in 685.

The Byzantine emperor Justinian II opposed this election and, viewing it as a challenge to his authority, sent troops in 694 to raid St. Maron’s monastery in Apamea, Syria. The attack resulted in the death of 500 monks. John Maron escaped to the citadel of Smar Jbeil but eventually faced pursuit by Byzantine forces led by generals Maurikios and Markianos, who sought to capture him in Lebanon. John Maron’s nephew, Prince Ibrahim, together with Prince Masud of the Mardaites, led a successful counterattack at Amioun, defeating the Byzantine army. Maurikios died on the battlefield, and Markianos succumbed to his wounds in Shoueti (Shwita).

The citizens of Amioun buried Maurikios in their town and built a church over his grave, celebrating his feast day on 26 July.

=== Crusader era ===
During the 12th and 13th centuries, the era of the Crusades, Amioun was part of the rural hinterland of the County of Tripoli, one of the states established in the Levant following the First Crusade. Amioun lay within the domain of the lords of Bismiddīn (modern Bishmizzine), a feudal territory south of Tripoli. The region was agriculturally productive and supported a relatively dense rural population. Archaeological and architectural evidence suggests that Amioun functioned as an important local settlement rather than a small village, as indicated by the unusually large number of medieval churches concentrated within and around its historic core. Amioun preserves one of the richest ensembles of medieval rural churches in northern Lebanon. Several churches dating to the 12th century reflect the coexistence of local Eastern Christian communities, primarily Melkite/Greek Orthodox, alongside Latin (Frankish) influences.

The Church of St Phocas is one of the most significant medieval monuments in Amioun. Built in the 12th century on the site of a 7th-century Melkite convent (likely situated on the burial site of Maurikios), it features an irregular basilican plan with three naves separated by triple-arched arcades and covered by pointed barrel vaults. The church originally extended further west, indicating later reduction or partial destruction. The interior preserves frescoes dating from the late 12th to early 13th century, featuring Greek inscriptions and a Byzantine iconographic program. These include saints such as St Phocas and St Simeon the Stylite, as well as scenes associated with funerary and baptismal rites. The church likely served the local Orthodox community.

Art historian Erica Cruikshank Dodd published her first study on the wall paintings in churches of indigenous Christian communities in the County of Tripoli. There, she discussed a painted effigy of a donor portrait appearing as a supplicant in the Melkite church of Mar Fauqa (St. Phocas) at Amioun, southeast of Tripoli. The ex voto scene depicts Philip the Apostle accompanied by a beardless supplicant with the same name identified by a Greek inscription as “the servant of God, Philip.”

Because Amioun lay within the territory of the Latin lords of Besmedin (modern Bishmizzine), Cruikshank Dodd searched for a potential donor among prominent members of the Frankish aristocracy. She proposed Philip of Ibelin (1180–1227), regent of the Kingdom of Cyprus in the early thirteenth century, as a possible candidate. She also connected the murals stylistically to late twelfth-century Cypriot wall paintings. Greek Orthodox iconographers from Cyprus may have painted the Church, as further supported by the fact that it contains only Greek inscriptions. The supplicant’s attire strengthens the proposed Cypriot connection. He appears bareheaded, wearing a white tunic, a long-sleeve, red robe with an ochre lining, and black boots. This costume closely resembles that of later Cypriot donor figures, including John Moutoullas in the church of the Panagia at Moutoullas (1280), as well as other beardless supplicants in Cypriot ecclesiastical painting. These visual parallels reinforce the plausibility of identifying the figure with Philip of Ibelin.

Philip of Ibelin, the youngest son of Balian of Ibelin and the Byzantine princess Maria Komnene, exemplifies the close interaction between Latin and Byzantine elites following the Frankish conquest of Cyprus in 1192. His family maintained strong ties to Eastern Christian traditions: his brother John, Old Lord of Beirut, employed Muslim, Syrian, and Greek—possibly Cypriot—craftsmen to decorate his palace in Beirut. Philip himself actively defended the Greek Orthodox Church against Latin pressure, a stance often linked to his partial Byzantine heritage. This background may explain why the supplicant combines Byzantine dress with the Frankish custom of appearing clean-shaven.

The Church of St George is a large 12th-century basilica constructed on the site of an earlier Melkite church, itself built over a pagan temple. With a capacity of approximately 250 worshippers, it is the largest medieval church in Amioun and may have functioned as the principal Latin church of the area's feudal lords, who were members of the broader Crusader Embriaco family. This is due to its architecture, which follows the Levantine Romanesque basilica type. The structure incorporates extensive antique spolia, including large reused stone blocks and columns taken possibly from nearby Roman temples. The apsidal wall and flanking columns exhibit Western architectural influence characteristic of Crusader-period construction.

Other churches and sanctuaries in Amioun dating to the Middle Ages include: St Dūmit’s Church, a 12th-century conventual chapel west of the old village; St Simeon the Stylite’s Church, with a medieval square plan located within the historic center; St George al-Kāfir, a funerary chapel on the southern approach to the village; A medieval grotto dedicated to St Marina the Monk, located in the eastern quarter of the old town.

The concentration and diversity of medieval churches in Amioun make it a key example of a rural Crusader-era settlement in northern Lebanon. The village illustrates the interaction between Latin feudal authority and local Eastern Christian communities, as well as the continuity of Byzantine religious traditions under Frankish rule. In particular, the two adjacent medieval churches of St Phocas and St George show that the settlement of Amioun had a considerable population during this period. Amioun’s surviving architecture provides valuable insight into settlement patterns, patronage, and religious life in the County of Tripoli during the 12th and 13th centuries.

=== Ottoman Era ===
Amioun appears in Ottoman defters from the 16th century as the largest town in the Nahiyah of Koura /Anfeh. The 1519 tax register records 163 Christian households, while the 1536 tax register lists 160 Christian households. By 1547, the number had increased to 210 Christian households alongside 3 Muslim households. In the 1571 defter, Amioun is recorded as having 312 households, all of them Christian. Amioun was part of the Tripoli Eyalet.

During this period, Sultan Selim I relocated a family of Sunni Muslim Ayyubid princes from Kurdistan and granted them control of Koura District. These Ayyubid princes settled across numerous villages in the district, expanded their holdings, and increased significantly in number. He assigned this territory to them as a defensive frontier against the Shia emirs Hamada, who at that time governed the mountainous region above Tripoli. According to a different narrative the Kurdish emirs settled in El Koura in 1588 to defend the coast against Europeans.

Cyril IV Dabbas' consecration as Greek Orthodox Patriarch of Antioch was held on April 24, 1619 in Amioun, by the hands of metropolitans Simeon of Hama, Lazaros of Homs and Dionysios of Hosn, under the political influence of the Beylerbey of the Tripoli Eyalet, Yusuf Sayfa.

During the same period, the official restoration of Balamand Monastery took place in 1603. The first page of the monastic register, written in 1610, records that Greek Orthodox monks restored the former Cistercian abbey after it had remained abandoned for 330 years. This restoration followed an agreement between the Orthodox hierarchy and the notables, monks, and inhabitants of Koura District. Youwakim, Metropolitan of Tripoli (1593–1604), initiated the undertaking, with indispensable support from local Muslim officials and from Sulayman al-Yaziji, the Christian secretary to the Beylerbey of Tripoli. Makarios al-Dirani, formerly abbot of Kaftoun, became the first abbot of the restored monastery, and approximately a dozen monks initially relocated from Amioun to Balamand. Russian sources indicate that following the outbreak of the Greek Revolution in 1821, reprisals forced the temporary abandonment of the Monastery of Balamand. A revival began in 1830 with the arrival of the superior Athanasios.

During the 1770s, the period that Emir Yusuf Shihab ruled, the family known as Al Azar took control of the village of Amioun. This political shift forced the Kurdish princes to relinquish half of the district of Koura. From that moment, contemporaries recognized a formal division of the territory into Upper Koura and Lower Koura. The Kurdish princes retained authority over Lower Koura, although economic decline gradually weakened their position. Gradually, they lost both the administrative control and the honorary governance of the district. Their ancestral seat stood at Ras Nhash and later at Nakhleh. Despite their impoverishment, members of the Ayoubi Kurdish lineage continue to claim and use the princely title.

Upper Koura, by contrast, fell under the authority of the Emirate of Mount Lebanon and came under the control of the family of local chiefs known as Al Azar, who adhered to the Greek Orthodox Church of Antioch. The founder of this family originated from the village of Azreh, probably modern day Izra in the Hauran and settled in Amioun, the administrative center of the Koura district, during the 16th century. Through land acquisition and strategic alliances, they accumulated considerable wealth and influence. They exercised joint authority over Koura alongside the Kurdish emirs under the governors of Tripoli until the formal division of territory and power brought this shared administration to an end.

Johann Ludwig Burckhardt, in his book Travels in Syria and the Holy Land, records his visit to the Koura District on March 12 and 13, 1812. He notes that the majority of the inhabitants of Koura belonged to the Greek Church and describes Amioun and its political and social structure. Regarding Amioun, he writes:

Half an hour to the west of Beshiza lies the village of Deir Bashtar. From the temple we turned N.-eastward, and at the end of half an hour passed the village Amyoun the chief place in the district of El Koura, and the residence of Assaf Ibn Asar, the governor of that province; he is a Greek Christian, and a collector of the Miri, which he pays into the hands of the Emir Beshir. Many Christian families are governors of provinces and Sheikhs of villages in the mountains: in collecting the Miri and making the repartitions of the extraordinary demands made by the Emir, they always gain considerable sums; but whenever a Sheikh has filled his purse, he is sure to fall a victim to the avidity of the chief governor. These Sheikhs affect all the pomp of the Turks; surpass them in family pride, and equal them in avarice, low intrigue, and fanaticism.

Antonius George Ameuney (1821-1881) was a Syrian Christian author, scholar, and professor of Arabic at King’s College London. He is best known for his memoir Notes from the Life of a Syrian (1860), which offers a firsthand account of social, cultural, and political life in the mid-19th-century Levant. Ameuney was born in Latakia in 1821, the son of Georgius Ameuney, whose family originated from Amioun. At the outset of the Greek Revolution, his family fled Latakia in 1821 amid persecution of Christians and resettled in Beirut. There, Ameuney spent his formative years.

On March 18, 1826, a flotilla of around fifteen Greek ships led by Vasos Mavrovouniotis attempted to spread the Greek Revolution to the Ottoman Levant. The Greek Revolutionaries landed in Beirut, but were thwarted by a local Mufti and a hastily arranged defence force. Although initially repelled, the Greeks did manage to hold on to a small portion of the city near the seashore in an area inhabited by local Rûm, where the house of the Ameuney family was located. A few days later, on March 23, 1826, the regional governor Abdullah Pasha ibn Ali sent his lieutenant and nearly 500 Albanian irregular forces to exact revenge for the failed uprising. In 1826, the family of Ameuny relocated to Zouk Mikael due to his father's alleged involvement in the Greek landing in Beirut. The family returned to Beirut in 1831.

In Notes from the Life of a Syrian (1860), Ameuney affirms his early sense of autonomy and ancestral pride. Recalling a confrontation at the age of fourteen with his father over his engagement with Protestant missionaries—and the ensuing reaction of the Greek bishop Benjamin, who denounced it as a scandal to the Church—he writes:

I said that the blood of my ancestors had not grown thin in my veins; that the people of Ameun (Amioun) were notoriously the most obstinate of all mountain tribes, so much so, that a proverb existed, that it took a sharp axe to split the skull of an Ameuney (Amiouni); that my great ancestor, Azar, had removed from Ameun (Amioun) to Latakia on account of a family quarrel; that I was fourteen years of age, and was therefore, by the law of the land, my own master; and that if anyone interfered with the freedom of my movements, I would ship myself and go to Greece.

In the early 1860s, Ernest Renan organized a mission to Lebanon to study Phoenician remains. Regarding Amioun, he made the following observation:

In Amyoun, I had also heard of a cave that had been converted into a church and was said to bear an inscription. One of my colleagues who visited the site saw a rock carved with niches, but no inscription. This may have been due to the hostility of the local population, who were entirely Greek Orthodox and, at the time, hostile to France. Burckhardt and Robinson likewise found the people of Amyoun to be fanatical and inhospitable.

=== Lebanese Civil War ===
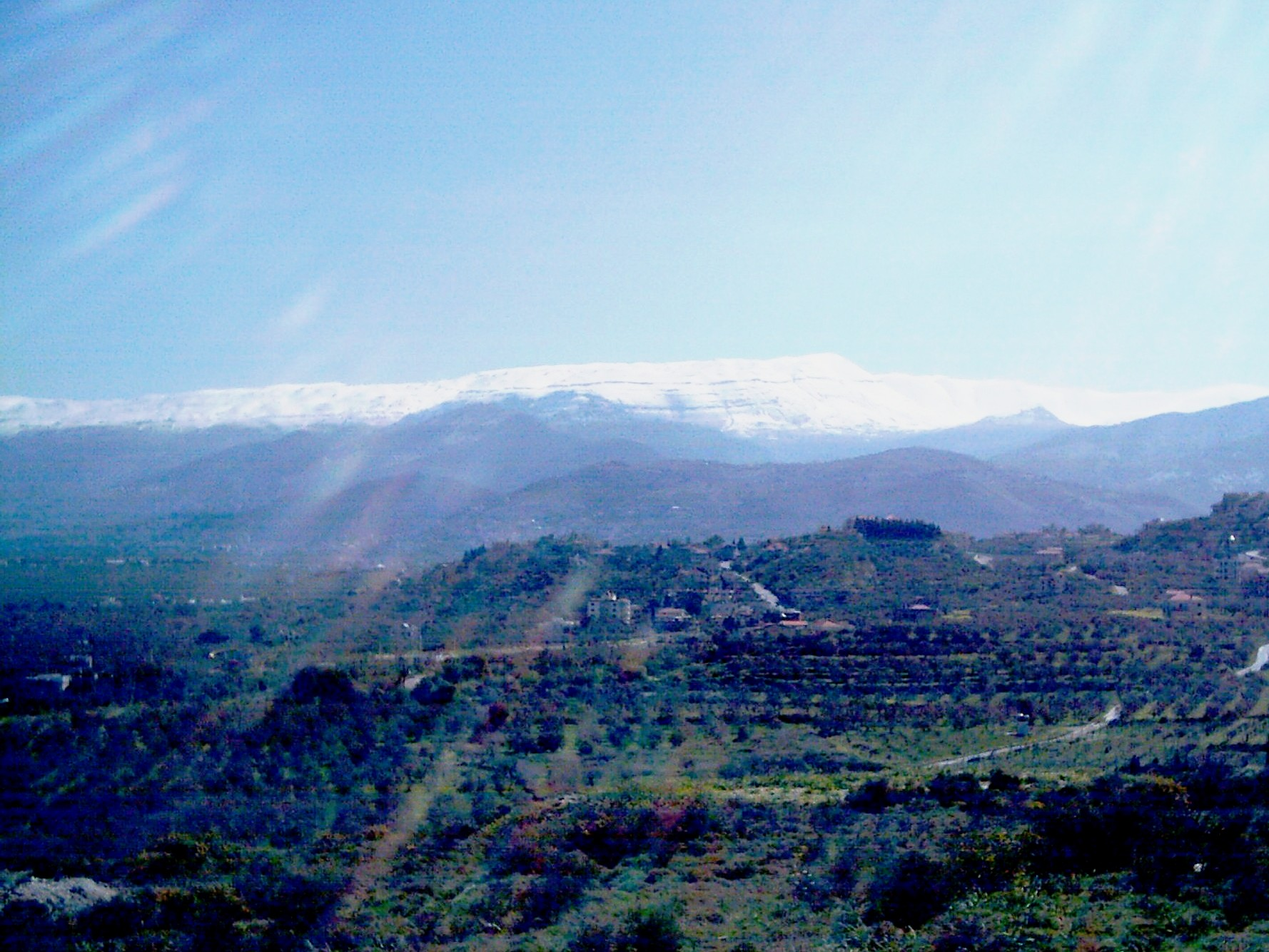
The view of Qurnat as Sawda', the highest point in the Levant from Amioun

During the Lebanese Civil War, Amioun occupied a strategic frontline position and functioned as a secular stronghold within the Lebanese National Movement, an alliance that brought together Palestinian forces and Lebanese leftist and secular groups. Amioun was one of the few Christian towns that supported the Palestine Liberation Organization, as the town had been a stronghold of the Syrian Social Nationalist Party and the Lebanese Communist Party, which was allied with the Palestinian resistance.

In July 1976, right-wing Christian militias of the Lebanese Front originating from the upper mountain regions launched an assault on Amioun, a predominantly Greek Orthodox town. The attack, following intense street fighting and extreme violence, resulted in the complete ransacking of the town and forced its inhabitants to flee to Tripoli, Lebanon. The Palestinians had accused the Syrian Army of participating in the fighting in the Koura District on the side of the right-wing militias of the Lebanese Front. The population remained displaced for approximately six months and began to return only gradually after 1978, as the intensity of the conflict diminished.

Tensions in Koura continued into the 1980s. The SSNP’s secular and nationalist ideology often drew criticism from Islamist groups, especially the Sunni Tawheed Movement in Tripoli. Ongoing ideological and military rivalry between the SSNP and Tawheed frequently produced localized clashes and political disputes during that period.

Renewed violence erupted in Amioun in July 1984. Fighting broke out in the Koura district as two pro-Syrian Lebanese militias competed for territorial control. Artillery, rockets, and mortars struck towns across the district, causing dozens of casualties. The clashes pitted the 600-member Christian Marada Movement against the secular Syrian Social Nationalist Party (SSNP). Amioun, Koura’s administrative center, emerged as the primary battleground. Rival forces occupied positions less than thirty meters apart, in the main square of Amioun, and the bombardment was heard as far as Tripoli, where many displaced residents had sought refuge.

The conflict between the Marada Movement and the Syrian Social Nationalist Party (SSNP) in the Koura region reflected local power struggles, territorial concerns, and ideological rivalries. Robert Frangieh, son of former Lebanese President Suleiman Frangieh and commander of the militia Zgharta Liberation Army, believed that Lebanon was heading toward fragmentation into smaller political entities. To secure strategic territory for the Frangieh clan, he proposed expanding Marada control beyond their Zgharta District stronghold. His plan focused on first seizing Koura from the SSNP and then moving toward Batroun District. He argued that Koura held high strategic and economic value due to its fertile agricultural land, cement factories, and the telecommunications antenna at Fih. Frangieh persuaded his father that the operation would succeed quickly and with limited resistance. At the time, mediation efforts led by the Lebanese Communist Party attempted to prevent escalation. Negotiations failed, and in Koura SSNP mobilized fighters in the area and prepared for armed resistance.

Marada forces advanced, expecting minimal opposition, but encountered the organized SSNP's militia Eagles of the Whirlwind defences around Amioun and nearby villages of Fih, Bterram, and Bishmizzine. Syrian forces intervened and halted further movement beyond that line. Reinforcements reached SSNP units from Akkar, the Bekaa Valley, and Southern Lebanon, although Syrian blockades limited some routes into Koura. Fighting intensified, and SSNP artillery units shelled the Frangieh palace in Zgharta during the confrontation. The balance shifted against the Zgharta Liberation Army militia, which lost momentum as SSNP reinforcements strengthened defensive positions. SSNP commanders later threatened to push into the Zgharta District, but Syrian intervention stopped additional escalation. Within about a week, hostilities subsided, and SSNP forces reestablished control over Koura up to the Amioun line.

On 29 December 1989, a large demonstration opposing General Michel Aoun took place in the town.

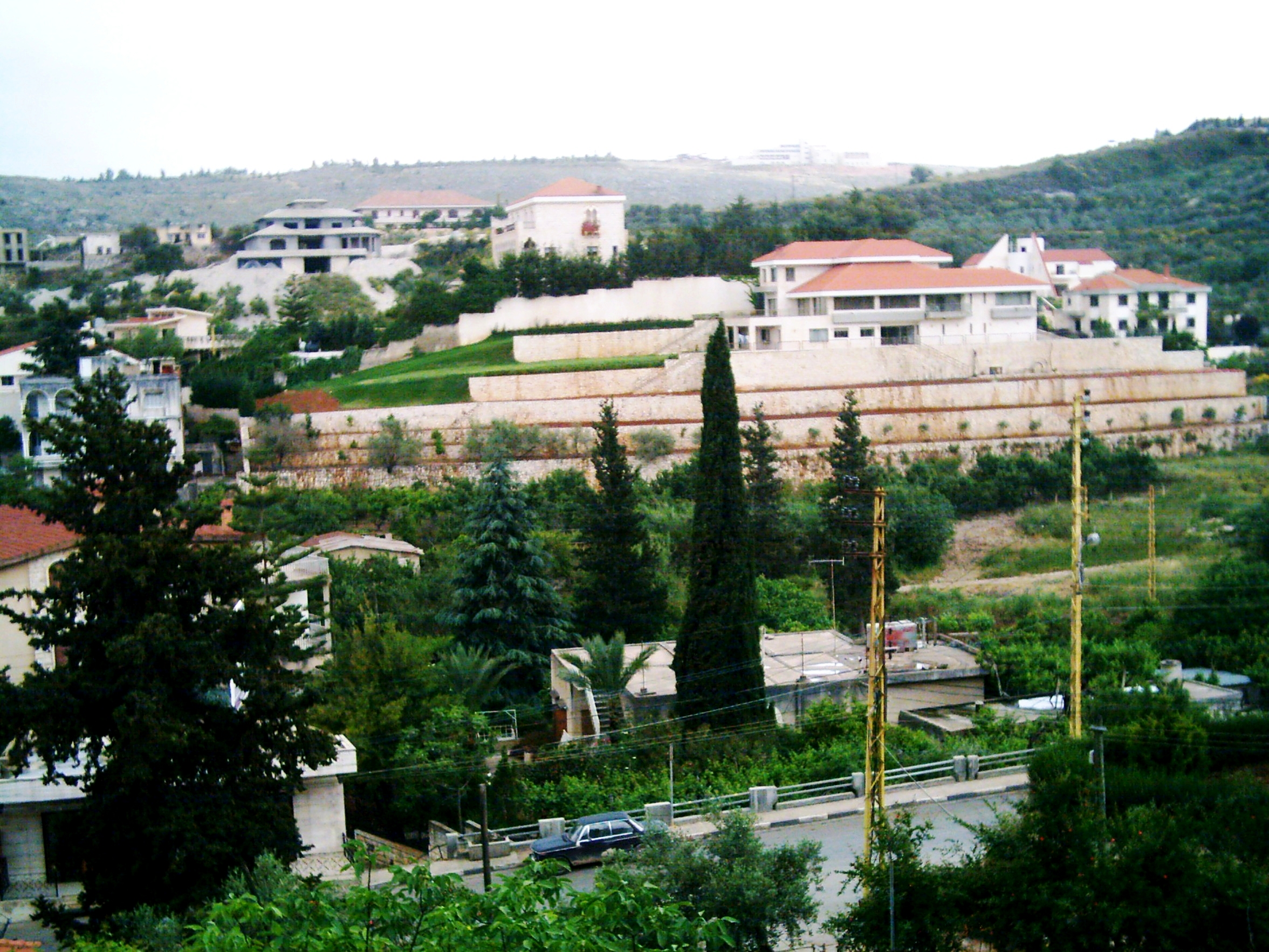

The Lebanese Civil War led to the pillaging and near-total evacuation of Amioun, forcing much of its population into displacement and exile across various regions of the world. This upheaval severely disrupted the town’s social and economic structures.

In the decades following the conflict, Amioun experienced significant reconstruction and economic revival, driven in large part by a newly affluent class emerging from the diaspora. Returning residents and expatriates invested heavily in rebuilding, transforming the town into a comparatively prosperous community. Reconstruction replaced many destroyed homes with larger residences, while new villas spread throughout the surrounding countryside.

== Global Emigration ==
Amioun exemplifies the demographic pattern of a Lebanese town in which a relatively small resident population contrasts with a large Lebanese diaspora of native inhabitants. Emigration from Amioun began as early as the mid-nineteenth century, when young men and entire families left Mount Lebanon for destinations primarily in the Americas and Australia. While the silk trade created significant economic opportunities throughout the 19th century, enabling local families such as the Taleb to accumulate wealth, by the end of the 19th century, economic decline played a central role in accelerating outward migration. During the last decades of the 19th century, the local silk textile industry and sericulture gradually declined after the introduction of inexpensive artificial silk from East Asia. In 1914, 45.6% of the income in Mount Lebanon was based on remittances from the diaspora in the Americas and 32.9% on local sericulture. The final collapse of this local economy happened during the Blockade of the Eastern Mediterranean in World War I, which, along with Ottoman policies, led to the Great Famine of Mount Lebanon. World War II, the 1958 Lebanon crisis, the 1961 Lebanese coup attempt, and the Lebanese Civil War (1975–1990)—further intensified emigration from Amioun. As a result, several Amiouni families disappeared entirely, while others experienced severe demographic decline. Despite this, seasonal return migration remains common, especially during summer holidays, when expatriates visit relatives and maintain social ties with the town.

=== Emigration to the United States ===
Early Settlement in Pennsylvania (1900s)

In the United States, one of the earliest and most significant Amiouni settlements emerged in Mount Pleasant, Pennsylvania and the Conemaugh Valley of Pennsylvania during the first decade of the twentieth century. Amiouni immigrants in Western Pennsylvania included Hanna "John" George Salem, George Deyoub, Gaha Azar, Salem Abboud "Sam Albert", Mikhail Salem, Hanna "John" Sarkis, Hanna "John" Farah, Habib Farah, George Jabbour, Fares Abdallah Maklouta, George Joseph Salem, Abdallah Joseph Salem, George Haider, Charles George, Fares Toney, Malik K Gantos, Shames McLoota, Deeb Heider Abraham, Alexander B. Gantos, Abraham Gantos Sr., Abraham Moses (Jabbour), George Deyoub, Elias Joseph McLoota, George Andrawos and Khalil Mikhail Jarjurah Hajj Aubayd "Charles Mike". By 1908, local business directories listed more than twenty individuals from Amioun operating dry goods stores in and around the city of Johnstown, Pennsylvania. Nearby towns such as Altoona, Pennsylvania also attracted migrants from Amioun, among them Khalil “George” Michael Bohahin, John Nassif, Elias George Burket, and Abdallah Ishak Karam.

Institutional and Cultural Legacy

These early immigrants established durable communal institutions, most notably Saint Mary Antiochian Orthodox Church in Johnstown in 1904, and the Saint George Antiochian Orthodox Church in Altoona in 1919, both of which continue to serve as religious and cultural centers for their descendants. In 1978, the Antiochian Orthodox Christian Archdiocese of North America founded the Antiochian Village, 30 kilometers (19 miles) west of Johnstown. The 300-acre area includes a Retreat and Conference Center and the Antiochian Heritage Museum & Library, established to promote understanding of Orthodox Christianity and Middle Eastern Culture. George N. Atiyeh, an Amiouni who served as professor of history at the University of Puerto Rico and head of the Near East Division at the Library of Congress between 1967 to 1994, donated a significant portion of his personal collection to the Antiochian Heritage Library. The prominence of this community is also reflected in later generations, including Jack Gantos, an American author of children's books, and Alex Azar, a Lebanese American former United States Secretary of Health and Human Services, whose family traces its origins to Amioun through the Johnstown diaspora.

Expansion Beyond Pennsylvania

During the initial wave of migration in the 1900s, people from Amioun also established themselves in several other American cities. In Bremond, Texas, Nicolas Farris ran a dry goods business; in Waco, Texas, the Atty brothers owned a grocery store; and in Shawnee, Oklahoma, Selin Ezer operated a general merchandise business.

A second wave of migration to the United States took shape between the 1950s and 1970s. During this period, Peoria, Illinois became an important destination for Amiouni emigrants, especially members of the Ghantous, Salem and Darazi families. Cleveland, Ohio also attracted migrants from Amioun particularly among the Rizek, Haoui, Issa and Bouchahine families. Most of these families initially settled in the suburb of Parma, Ohio. The Parish Priest of the Saint George Antiochian Orthodox Church in Cleveland, Fr. John Ojaimi, is also from Amioun.

From the 1970s onward, the Amiouni diaspora expanded into the Boston metropolitan area, which emerged as a major center of settlement. Amiounis initially settled in the adjacent Boston neighbourhoods of Roslindale and West Roxbury, which shared a sizable Syrian-Lebanese community and became home to the Saint George Antiochian Orthodox Church after it relocated to West Roxbury in 1976. During the 1980s and 1990s, the Amiouni community expanded into Dedham, Massachusetts, Norwood, Massachusetts and other Boston suburbs. During the 1970s and 1980s, a significant number of people from Amioun also attended Northeastern University. Members of the Makhlouta, Rizk, Ibrahim, Ghantous, Salem, Chammas, Hawi, Mansour, Badawi, Fares, Azar, Issa, Nassif, among others, have settled in Massachusetts.

=== Emigration to Argentina ===
Early Migration (1880s–1920s)

People from Amioun began immigrating to Argentina in significant numbers between the 1880s and the 1920s. These emigrants integrated into regional economies and intellectual life, contributing both commercially and politically to their host society. Early generations achieved notable economic success, often beginning as itinerant merchants before establishing permanent businesses.

Pioneer Families and Economic Contributions

One of the earliest and most prominent Amiouni families in Argentina was the Chemes family. Salvador Elías Chemes arrived in Santa Fe, Argentina around 1880 becoming the first bearer of the Chemes surname in the country. His arrival initiated a chain migration that soon brought his brothers Jorge, Amado, and Miguel Chemes, as well as his nephews Jacobo, Juan, and Antonio Chemes. Like many Lebanese immigrants of his generation, Salvador Elías began as a travelling merchant and later established a shop on San Jerónimo Street (No. 2200) in Santa Fe at the turn of the 20th century.

Another notable figure born in Amioun was Juan Fara, who arrived in the province of Tucumán in 1891. He started as a small-scale merchant in Villa Quinteros, later expanding into tobacco trading and becoming one of the region’s principal tobacco exporters. Fara subsequently invested in sugar cane cultivation and founded the Ingenio Juan Fara refinery, emerging as a major figure in the southern Tucumán sugar industry.

Nabih Jozami emigrated from Amioun to Argentina when he was sixteen and settled in the city of La Banda. He began his career as a peddler before opening his own shop. After achieving economic stability, he founded in 1931 the Sociedad Sirio-Libanesa de La Banda (Syrian-Lebanese Association of La Banda). The Association, still existing today, is currently directed by Ricardo Jozami.

The Kozameh family arrived in Santiago del Estero Province in the late 1800s. Abraham Kozameh, born in Amioun, and his brother Nicolás opened a general store in the provincial capital and, five years later, expanded their business with a larger store in La Banda. They became wholesalers in 1911, selling goods along the Central Argentine Railway line, which extended southeast to Santa Fe province. Between 1916 and 1917, Abraham Kozameh served as treasurer of La Banda and later as a delegate of the local branch of the Banco de la Nación Argentina.

Emilio Azar and Zaide Nehme Chemes were Lebanese immigrants from Amioun, Lebanon, known for their significant contributions to the commercial and cultural development of Posadas, Misiones, Argentina, in the early 20th century. Facing the social and economic challenges of the time, they emigrated to South America in the early 1910s. Their journey took them first to Rio de Janeiro, Brazil, before they continued to Argentina. Around 1914–1915, they arrived in Posadas, where they would establish their family and business. In Posadas, Azar and Chemes opened a general store called La Estrella, which served as a central commercial and social hub in the city. The store provided essential goods and services and became an important meeting place for residents. The building that housed La Estrella is one of the city’s oldest commercial structures and reflects early 20th-century architecture in Misiones. The restored building now functions as the seat of the Tribunal de Cuentas de Misiones, the provincial audit office, and is recognized as a historic architectural landmark, highlighting the role of immigrant entrepreneurship in the region’s development.

Emilio and Zaide had ten children. Of the 10 children born to the Azar-Chemes couple, four remained in Posadas, and six others moved to La Plata, Buenos Aires, and Entre Ríos Province. Their descendants pursued various professions, including journalism, law, and education, and helped expand familial and cultural ties within Argentina. The family’s legacy remains visible in Posadas both through the continued recognition of La Estrella and through ongoing contributions to the local community.

Documented Arrivals and Family Networks

During this period, several immigrants from Amioun arrived in Buenos Aires aboard the passenger ship Giulio Cesare. Among them were Salim Mikhail Jazbek Khozami (15 years old), Brahim Salim Chamas (17), Jarjoura Jacob Chamas (53), Salim Brahim Chamas (49), and Michel Brahim Chamas (12). Other Amiouni settlers included Nicolas Dib Mounayar, born in 1893 in Amioun, whose descendants today reside in Córdoba, Argentina, San Fernando del Valle de Catamarca, and Monteros. The Saad family settled in San Juan, Argentina, a city with a large Lebanese Argentine community. Three brothers of the Saadeh family also settled in Argentina.

Settlement in Diamante, Entre Ríos

Many families from Amioun settled in the town of Diamante, Entre Ríos. According to the Unión Líbano Siria Argentina de Diamante, local families such as the Chemes, Farall, Josami, Meded, Abichain, Obeid, Taleb, Azar, and Naput trace their origins to Amioun.

Political, Cultural, and Intellectual Contributions

Julio Naput, of Amiouni descent, was active in Arab community advocacy in Rosario. A cablegram dated 6 February 1948 and sent to the United Nations Palestine Commission from Julio Naput recorded his protest, on behalf of the Arab population of Rosario, Argentina, against the proposed partition of Palestine. Naput was also a translator who rendered works of Kahlil Gibran into Spanish in Argentina.

The Argentine politician Jorge Obeid, a native of Diamante, served two terms as Governor of Santa Fe Province (1995–1999 and 2003–2007), was Mayor of the city of Santa Fe between 1989-1995, and elected with the Justicialist Party to the Argentine Chamber of Deputies representing Santa Fe (1999-2003, 2007-2011 and 2013-2014). He was the grandson of Abraham Juan El Halli Obeid Caram, an immigrant to Argentina who was born in Amioun in 1882.

Another prominent figure of Amiouni descent was Leila Belkys “Camila” Sade El Juri Naput, who was also born in Diamante, a psychologist and militant of the Workers' Revolutionary Party (Argentina) and its armed wing, the People's Revolutionary Army (Argentina). She was kidnapped and disappeared in 1977 by the military dictatorship during the period known as the Dirty War, at the age of 41.

Eduardo Jozami was an academic, former political prisoner, and human rights activist, whose parents were from Amioun.

Lebanese Argentine academic, psychologist and professor at the Universidad Argentina John F. Kennedy María Ester Jozami, also traces her origins in Amioun. Her research is about exile, migration and the Lebanese diaspora in Argentina.

=== Emigration to Mexico ===
Settlement in Campeche

In Mexico, the state of Campeche received a significant concentration of immigrants from Amioun. Of the 87 Lebanese Mexican families recorded in the state, 29 came from Amioun.

Early Arrivals

The earliest known immigrant from Amioun was Juan Nazar, who arrived around 1894 with his wife, Salua Zaidén, and established himself in Campeche as a merchant. The couple had five children: Adib, Soad, José, Mundo, and Mario. Another immigrant from Amioun, Juan Abraham Munayer, owned a general merchandise store in Campeche in 1908.

The Azar Family

Chain migration from Amioun became particularly evident through extended family networks, most notably among the Azar family. Alejandro Azar arrived in Campeche in 1908 with his wife, Salime Farah, and their two children. Following Salime Farah’s death, he remarried a Mexican woman and had six additional children.

In 1912, José Azar arrived from Amioun with his wife Nagibe Farah and their three children. Another brother, Julián Azar, arrived in 1920 with his Lebanese wife María Miguel, and was later followed by a third brother, Antonio Azar. Additional relatives, including Adib Azar and Salim Azar, arrived at unknown dates. Within slightly more than a decade, six related Azar families had settled in Campeche.

The Abraham Family

Members of the Abraham family arrived primarily around 1920. Notable figures included Salim Abraham Rufellil and his wife Nahiba Adam, who had six children; Neme Abraham and his wife Carmen Borge; and Elena Rufail, widow of Abraham, who supported her relative Nagibe Rufail.

The Selem and Gantus Families

Another major migration chain from Amioun was formed by the Selem family. Seven Selem families arrived between 1923 and 1928, including Antonio Selem; Yazmín Gantus, widow of Selem; Elías Selem, an engineer; Nicolás Selem; Felipe Selem; and Juan Selem, who arrived in 1927 with his wife María Chammas. Abraham Selem later relocated to Ciudad del Carmen.

Antonio Gantus, another immigrant from Amioun and part of this broader kinship network, married a Mexican woman and had ten children: Manuel, Gilberto, Genoveva, Aida, Nelly, Antonio, Catalina, David, Alejandra, and Latife.

Demographic and Cultural Impact

Between 1894 and 1927, 29 families from Amioun settled in Campeche, while two additional families remained in Mérida, Mexico. Of those who settled in Campeche, 21 lived in Campeche (city), two relocated to Ciudad del Carmen, one settled in Seybaplaya, and the locations of five families remain unknown. A small number of surnames—most notably Azar, Selem, Abraham, and Gantus—dominated the community. In total, 39 first-generation immigrants from Amioun arrived in Campeche and had 68 children, resulting in an Amiouni-Mexican population of 107 people. This demographic concentration confirms Amioun as the principal place of origin for Lebanese immigrants in Campeche during this period.

In 1951, the brothers Felipe and Elías Selem, of Amiouni origin, founded the Cine Selem, the first modern cinema in Campeche. Fausta Gantús, a Mexican professor of History at the Instituto de Investigaciones Dr. José María Luis Mora, is a descendant of the Amiouni diaspora of Campeche. Another descendant is Alejandro Azar Pérez, the Red Cross's delegate in the state of Campeche.

=== Emigration to other Latin American Countries ===
Brazil

Brazil was among the earliest destinations for emigrants from Amioun, becoming part of the wider Lebanese migration movement that began in the early 1870s. Like many Lebanese communities, Amioun experienced sustained emigration as families sought economic opportunity and stability abroad. Brazil, with its open immigration policies and growing economy, attracted several generations of Amiouni migrants who eventually settled permanently and became Brazilian citizens. Brazilian records of naturalizations between 1884 and 1924 identify 22 naturalized citizens born in Amioun. The earliest among them is Elias Hanna Azagair, born in 1803. Most of the individuals, however, were born between the 1870s and the early 1900s, aligning with the peak period of Lebanese migration to Brazil. This group includes Anni Antonio Saad (born 1871), Abraham Miquel Abdu (1878), Jorge Abrahao Rad (1882), Joun Jorge Sad (1886), Esequiel Nahum Bagdadi (1887), Saiede Jorge Haui (1890), and Joao Bechara Caram (1891). A significant number were born in the 1890s, a generation that came of age as Lebanese migration networks in Brazil were already well established. These include Abrahao Habib Raphael and Abrao Miquel Ramade (both born in 1895), Alexandre Cure Gnatus (1896), Najb Hanna Alzuguiar (1897), and Miquel Faical (1899). They were followed by those born at the turn of the century, such as Jorge Bechara Caram (1900) and Nacim Javoub Gantus (1902). The youngest group reflects the continuation of Amiouni migration into the twentieth century, including Anijel Selem Dib (born 1903), Elias Joao Haui (1908), Linda Abdalla Rafael (1909), Antonio Joao Saade (1909), Habib Jacub (1909), Elias Abrahao Miquel (1916), and Alexandre Jorge Selem (1921).

Colombia

In Colombia, Lebanese migrants from Amioun settled primarily in areas such as Caldas and Honda, Tolima, where they established themselves in commercial activities. Individuals such as Abdalla Nahmi Shammas, Jorge Assad Shammas, Nicola Chamas, and Abdalla Chamas played visible roles in local trade and regional economic networks.

Dominican Republic and the Caribbean

The Dominican Republic became another important destination for Amiouni migrants during the late nineteenth and early twentieth centuries. As elsewhere in the Caribbean, for example, in Trinidad and Tobago, early arrivals from Amioun typically began as itinerant peddlers before accumulating sufficient capital to open permanent retail establishments. By the 1900s, the district of La Atarazana in Santo Domingo had developed into a hub of Arab commerce, hosting textile businesses owned by merchants such as Nicolas Elias Majluta, who was born in Amioun in 1869, and his sons Alejandro, Jacobo, Gabriel and Abraham Majluta. His brother George Majluta, born in Amioun in 1868, also immigrated to the Dominican Republic along with his wife Marta Dájer de Majluta, and their two daughters Mariana Majluta and Saide Majluta, who were born in Amioun in 1888 and 1889, respectively. Najib Azar, who was born in Amioun in 1861, and his wife, Lattife Azar, immigrated to the Dominican Republic in 1899, where they had 10 children. The family operated a general merchandise store in Santo Domingo.

Over time, the Lebanese Dominican community expanded its influence across political, academic, and economic spheres. Notable figures of Amiouni descent include Jacobo Majluta, who served as President of the Dominican Republic in 1982, Vice-President between 1978 and 1982, President of the Senate in 1982-1983 and in 1985-1986, and Minister of Finance in 1963, as well as José Hazim Frappier, an academic, politician, and former rector of the Universidad Central del Este, a university founded by his father José Hazim Azar.

=== Emigration to Canada ===
Canada also attracted migrants, particularly to Ottawa and Montreal. A notable figure from this diaspora was Abdallah Hage Obeid, a Lebanese Canadian academic who founded in 1982 the Department of Arabic Studies and directed the Chair in Arabic Studies at the University of Ottawa. Lamia Ghantous Charlebois living in Montreal, is also from Amioun. She is a public relations consultant, author, speaker, and columnist. Known for her dynamic presence and community engagement, Ghantous Charlebois is also an active figure within the Lebanese diaspora. Through both public initiatives and behind-the-scenes work, she has sought to strengthen solidarity within the diaspora and to foster closer connections between Lebanese communities abroad and Lebanon.

=== Emigration to Australia ===
Beyond the Americas, Australia emerged as a major destination for Lebanese Amiouni emigrants throughout the twentieth century, with sizable communities forming in Sydney and Melbourne.

=== Emigration to France ===
France is mostly a destination for academic migration for the people of Amioun. Two important examples were Victoria Khouzami and Leila Saadeh.

Victoria Khouzami (b.1907) pursued advanced studies in French literature in Paris and achieved distinction as the first Lebanese woman to obtain a State Doctorate in French literature from the Sorbonne. Her academic work and public activity focused on promoting cultural dialogue and university cooperation between Lebanon and France. In 1948, Khouzami established the Association Culturelle Franco-Libanaise. She created the organization to support academic exchange and to promote the construction of a Lebanese student residence within the Cité internationale universitaire de Paris. The project aimed to host outstanding Lebanese students and encourage cooperation among international academic communities. Her efforts led to the laying of the foundation stone in 1961. The Maison du Liban opened in the Cité internationale universitaire de Paris on May 8, 1965, with Lebanese President Charles Hélou attending the inauguration. The residence became an important center for Lebanese students in Paris and contributed to long-term academic cooperation between the two countries. Khouzami received several distinctions for her cultural and educational work. Lebanon awarded her the Order of the Cedar at the rank of Officer. In 2004, the President of the French Republic promoted her to Commander of the Legion of Honour.

Leila Saadeh (b.1955) is a Lebanese legal scholar and academic specializing in private and penal law. She holds a PhD in Private Law from Panthéon-Assas University (Paris II) and has played a leading role in the development of francophone legal education and doctoral studies in Lebanon and the Middle East. She later joined the Lebanese University, where she founded and directed the French Section of the Faculty of Law, Political and Administrative Sciences (1996–2011) and served as Dean of the Doctoral School of Law, Political, Administrative and Economic Sciences (2007–2014). She also chaired the Doctoral School of Law of the Middle East (EDDMO) and held leadership and advisory roles with the Agence universitaire de la Francophonie (AUF), including membership in its Scientific Council and presidency of its Regional Expert Committee. She serves as president of the Francophone Network of Women Leaders in Higher Education and Research (RESUFF) and participates in several doctoral and scientific boards in Lebanon and France.

=== Emigration to Greece ===
Some people from Amioun began pursuing higher education in Greece during the 1970s and 1980s, especially at universities in Athens and Thessaloniki. A few graduates settled in Greece, while most returned to Lebanon or later migrated to other countries. In 1994, alumni founded the League of Lebanese Graduates from Greek Universities (LLGGU) in Amioun. The current president is Bassam Obeid, who is also from Amioun. The League brings together Lebanese who studied at Greek universities and promotes Greek language and culture in Lebanon. According to the League’s president, between 200 and 250 Lebanese students, mostly from Koura District, have graduated from Greek institutions, although many now live abroad rather than in Lebanon. Members view themselves as cultural bridges between Lebanon and Greece and describe their knowledge of the Greek language as a gateway to Greek culture. The League encourages continued cultural and linguistic exchange between the two countries. Based in Amioun, LLGGU organizes several regular activities, including an annual Vasilopita dinner, the Greek Language International Day, a Greek Day celebration in early May for Protomaya, and a Greek Film Festival.

=== Contemporary Migration and Diaspora Statistics ===
In more recent decades, migration from Amioun has extended to France, West Africa—especially Nigeria—and the United Arab Emirates. Unlike earlier waves, these movements largely consist of temporary labour migration or student mobility rather than permanent settlement.

Electoral data illustrate the continuing scale and geographic dispersion of the Amiouni diaspora. In the 2022 Lebanese general election, 6,847 voters were registered in Amioun, of whom 627 (approximately 9.2 percent) resided abroad. Among these diaspora voters, 23 percent registered from Australia, 22 percent from the United States, 13.4 percent from the United Arab Emirates, 9.3 percent from France, and 7.2 percent from Canada.

== Medicine and Medical Education in Amioun ==
Amioun produced a significant number of physicians through a sustained institutional connection with the American University of Beirut (AUB). This relationship extended beyond Lebanon into the diaspora and shaped regional patterns of medical education and professional mobility during the late nineteenth and first half of the twentieth centuries. Physicians from Amioun typically pursued rigorous training at AUB, complemented by military service, postgraduate specialization, and clinical practice across the Eastern Mediterranean, Middle East, North Africa, Europe, and North America.

Early Graduates (Late 19th – Early 20th Century)

The earliest documented physician from Amioun to graduate from AUB was Mahfuz Talib (also spelled Taleb), who earned his Doctor of Medicine in 1884. He combined medical practice with administrative service, serving as both district governor and physician in the Koura District.

Interwar Generation

Several Amiouni physicians emerged during the early twentieth century, many combining medical practice with military or administrative roles. Hanna Ibrahim Ghantus (b.1886), who earned his medical degree from AUB in 1914, served as a captain in the Ottoman Army during the First World War. He later completed a residency in internal medicine at the University of Paris in 1919. Ghantus practiced extensively in Tripoli, served as municipal physician in Anfeh, worked at al-Shamal al-Watani Hospital, led the AUB Alumni Association in North Lebanon, and acted as medical officer in charge of Palestinian refugees in Tripoli.

His contemporary Anis Ibrahim Ghantus (b.1888) graduated from AUB with a Doctor of Medicine in 1916.

During the 1920s, Nakhla Ilyas Shammas (b.1899) completed his medical studies at AUB, served as a lieutenant with the Sudan Government, and pursued advanced specialization in Paris and Vienna. At the same time, Fuʾad Habib Taleb (b.1896) combined his AUB medical education with municipal leadership in Amioun and later served as a physician in Sudan, holding the rank of captain in the Sudan Defence Force.

Academic Medicine and International Training

Musa Khalil Ghantus (b.1903), who graduated from AUB in 1928, represented a particularly prominent academic trajectory. Early in his career, he gained clinical experience at the Hospices Civils de Lyon (1927–1928) before returning to AUB as an instructor of anatomy (1928–1931). He later pursued advanced study at the University of Michigan (1931–1932) on a Rockefeller Foundation scholarship, earning a professional diploma. Ghantus subsequently advanced through the academic ranks at AUB, serving as assistant, associate, and full professor of anatomy between 1932 and 1948, and later as Associate Dean. In 1948–1949, he served as a visiting professor of anatomy at Western Reserve University in Cleveland.

Later Physicians and Continued Mobility

Other physicians from Amioun expanded their medical practice across Lebanon and the wider region. Albert Khalil Karam (b.1891) completed his medical studies in 1920 at the Université Saint-Joseph medical school and practiced in Beirut and Port Said.

Ilyas ʿAbdallah Dib (b.1911), who completed his medical education at AUB in the 1930s, pursued postgraduate training in cardiology in the United States and later practiced in Tripoli.

By the mid-twentieth century, ʿAbdullah Khuri Nicola Saʿadah (b.1918) and May Hanna Saʿadah (b.1916) represented a later generation shaped by the same institutional link. May Hanna Saʿadah earned her medical degree from AUB in 1940, specialized in obstetrics and gynecology, and served at hospitals in Tripoli. ʿAbdullah Khuri Nicola Saʿadah completed his medical degree at AUB in 1944, practiced in Tripoli and El-Mina, and later worked in Homs and Jeddah.

Nagib Nassim Taleb (father of Nassim Taleb the author), an oncologist and hematologist from Amioun, was first in the entrance examination to the University of Paris Faculty of Medicine in 1942, and first in the Hôtel-Dieu internship examination in 1946. Dr. Taleb was one of the first Lebanese hematologists, trained at the school of Jean Bernard, and the founder of the first blood bank in Lebanon. In 1976, he became the first non-Jesuit dean of the Université Saint-Joseph Faculty of Medicine.

== Schools, Universities and Hospitals ==
In the town, there are three public and two private schools, the Lycée Saint Pierre Orthodoxe and the Sainte Therese Amioun School. In 2006, 308 students were enrolled in the public schools, and 1503 in the two private schools.

The University of Balamand is located nearby, 9.6 kilometers (6.0 miles) north. There is a public library and the Fouad Bourgi Hospital.

== Churches and Monasteries ==
There are 14 places of Christian worship in Amioun, including a cathedral, churches and monasteries.

Cathedral

- Saint George el Dahleez (Greek Orthodox) Cathedral (Mar Jawarjious Al Dahliz)

Saint George Cathedral, one of the largest churches in Amioun, derives its name from a subterranean structure accessible through an opening in the nave floor. Local tradition maintains that an underground passage once linked the cathedral to a tower near the Church of the Dormition of the Virgin Mary (Kanissat Sayyidat al-Niyah), also in Amioun. The cathedral occupies the site of a Roman temple, whose architectural and decorative elements remain incorporated into the present structure. Craftsmen constructed the apse during the Crusader period. Surviving features of the ancient temple include a Corinthian capital adapted as a baptismal font and stone blocks reused in the bishop’s throne. A large stone vessel made from Roman-era material stands outside the church near the apse. The cathedral preserves approximately eighty icons and an iconostasis, including the oldest known icon in Amioun, dated to 1760.

Churches

- Saint Ghala (Our Lady of Marghala) (Greek Orthodox) Church

The Church of Our Lady of Marghala stands in the far southwestern part of Amioun, in an area officially designated as the “Citadel of Marghala.” The site originally served as a monastic habitation, where monks took refuge in nearby natural caves, one of which functioned as a shrine. In 1910, the community transformed this cave-shrine into a church dedicated to Our Lady of the Breastfeeding, commonly known as Marghala. The church is modest in scale, measuring approximately 5.75 meters in length and 8 meters in width, and follows an arched architectural form. During the Civil War, looting resulted in the loss of most of the church’s ancient furnishings and artifacts. In subsequent years, the parish undertook restoration and renewal efforts, introducing new liturgical furnishings and icons. In 2000, the community added a new building adjacent to the church, which now serves the Christian parish as a center for religious, educational, and communal activities. Several large natural caves lie next to the church, some of which local herders formerly used as cattle shelters.

- Saint Barbara (Greek Orthodox) Church

A small modern church dedicated to Saint Barbara stands adjacent to the town cemetery on the northwestern side of Amioun’s northern hill. The building follows a rectangular plan, measuring approximately 11.80 meters in length and 6.90 meters in width. The interior contains four icons executed in a modern Greek style, dating to the period between 1968 and 1970, which depict the sisters of the Monastery of Saint Yaʿqub al-Farisi, martyred in the town of Deddeh in the Koura district. The church lies near what is known as the “statue quarter,” named after the former statue of Sheikh Gerges El-Azar, whose pedestal remains in situ. El-Azar ranked among the most prominent figures of Koura and Amioun during the period of the Mutasarrifiyya and governed the region from 1892 to 1908. In his honour, the community erected a bronze statue, which was later stolen following the invasion of Amioun during the civil war. Adjacent to the church lie the burial grounds of the town’s western neighbourhood, while a playground for the Amioun Youth Club was established nearby in the early 1990s.

- Saint Phocas (Greek Orthodox) Church (Mar Fawqa)

Saint Phocas Church in Amioun dates to the Crusader period, a rare survival among churches in Lebanon. It remains the only church in the country to preserve Frankish-style frescoes alongside Greek inscriptions. Frescoes from the twelfth and thirteenth centuries decorate the apse, walls, and pillars. Despite centuries of restoration and alteration, the church has retained much of its historical character. Both the Catholic and Eastern Orthodox Churches venerate Saint Phocas as a martyr. His hagiography appears to merge the lives and traditions of three figures bearing the same name: Phocas of Antioch, Phocas, Bishop of Sinope, and Phocas the Gardener.

- Saydet Amioun (Our Lady) (Greek Orthodox) Church

The Church of Our Lady of the Dormition (Niyah as-Sayyidé) is located in the center of the old town of Amioun. It was built in 1918 on the site of a small vaulted church dating back to the 16th century. The roof of the church was restored in 1960. The building is currently in good condition and serves as a parish church. Designed as a single hall, it reflects a Levantine syncretic style and has a capacity of approximately 150 people.

- Saint Simon Stylites (Greek Orthodox) Church (Mar Semaan Al Amoudi)

Scholars estimate that the Church of Saint Simeon Stylites was originally constructed during the Crusader period. After its destruction in 1773, the community rebuilt and modified the church in subsequent phases. The interior preserves approximately forty icons, the earliest dating to the late seventeenth or early eighteenth century, as well as several manuscripts, the oldest of which dates to 1773.

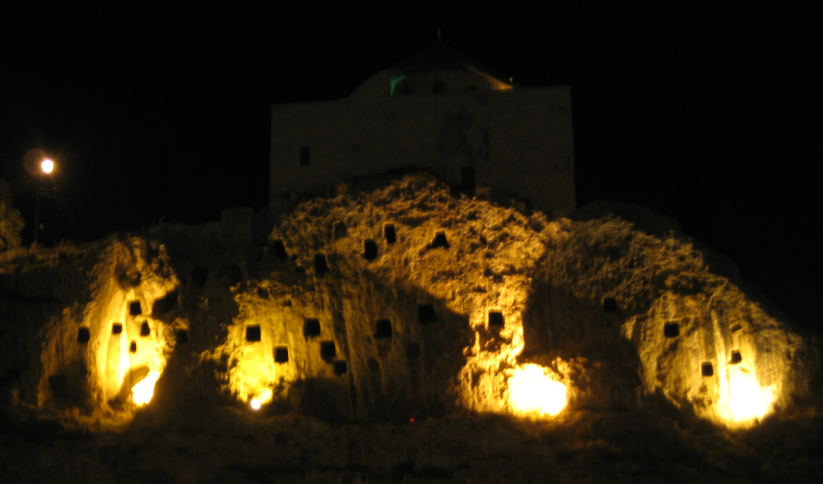
Saint John Al Sheer Church at night

- Saint John (Greek Orthodox) Church (Al Sheer)

In Lebanese dialect, al-sheer denotes a steep cliff, a term that aptly describes the Al Sheer formation in Amioun. This natural landmark derives its distinctive character from a series of cavities carved into the rock face. Dating to the Roman period, twenty-eight rock-cut chambers with square openings initially served as tombs and were later adapted for habitation. Crosses incised on several walls and ceilings—recently identified by the local artist Nickolas El-Ojaimi—attest to their subsequent Christian use. Comparable rock-cut tombs appear in the more rugged eastern area of Amioun. A domed church dedicated to Saint John the Baptist, constructed in the nineteenth century, crowns the cliff.

- Saint Marina (Greek Orthodox) Church and Cave (Qadissa Marina)

The Cave of Saint Marina, located near the modern church of Saint Marina, originated as a Roman rock-cut burial vault, similar to the funerary carvings found at Al Sheer. Oriented eastward, the cave’s altar occupies the position of the former coffin. Local tradition associates the site with Saint Marina, who, according to legend, sought refuge in the cave while fleeing persecution.

- Saint Theresa (Maronite) Church

Monasteries

- Saint George (Greek Orthodox) Monastery

The Saint George Monastery (Mar Gerios el-Kefr) is located south of the town of Amioun, on the road to Bziza. Dating back to the 12th century, it was built on the site of an earlier Melkite chapel that itself occupied an ancient location. The monastery underwent restoration at the turn of the 19th century, followed by a major expansion between 1963 and 1965, during which a bell tower was added. The site was looted during the Lebanese Civil War (1975–1990). In 2003, restoration works included the stripping of the iconostasis, the paving of the sanctuary, and the reconstruction of the altar. Today, the chapel is in good condition.

- Saint Domitius (Greek Orthodox) Monastery

Constructed in the nineteenth century during the Ottoman period, the Monastery of Saint Domitius occupies the site of an earlier monastery dating to the twelfth century. The church interior preserves sixteen icons from the mid-nineteenth century, originating from Jerusalem. Numerous caves and vaulted chambers carved into the surrounding rock formations encircle the monastery.

- Saint Sergios and Bakhos (Greek Orthodox) Monastery (Mar Sarkis & Bakhos)

Perched on a hilltop in southern Amioun, this monastery dates to the Ottoman period. Its interior features a rich collection of icons painted by the artist Mekhael Mehanna Al-Qodsi, widely regarded as a masterpiece of Greek Catholic art. Nearby, Lazar houses once served to quarantine lepers and prevent the spread of disease among the village population, although these structures have long since been demolished.

Sacred places

- Saint George Oratory (Mazar Mar Gerios al-Haniyé) of Amioun

The Saint George Oratory (Mazar Mar Gerios al-Haniyé) is located in the old quarter of Amioun, within an urban environment. It was built on the site of a medieval chapel, of which only the apse was still visible in the 19th century. Today, the structure is in a state of ruin. The site takes the form of a sacred stone and is constructed from white limestone.

== Heritage Sites ==
- Grinding Wheel Remains
- George Al Azar Statue

The name refers to the statue once erected in the square dedicated to Sheikh Gerges El-Azar, one of the most prominent rulers of the Koura region during the period of the Mutasarrifate. He died in 1908 while returning from supervising the town’s water supply project, succumbing to heatstroke during the summer. In his honor, the community erected a statue in the square, in front of his residence, and planted a cedar tree nearby. A commemorative plaque also marked the completion of the town’s water system. During the civil war, however, the statue was stolen when attackers entered Amioun in 1976.

- Ancient Well
- Mamlouk Tower
- Al Dar Quartier

Al Dar—the stronghold of the Al Azar family during the Ottoman period—carries its own unique history. The district includes the courthouse and palace of the Al Azar family, testifying to its long-standing prominence. It also encompasses the residence of Mustafa Agha Barbar, a former hostler who later became governor of Tripoli; the house of Prince Haidar Al Chehabi near Al Ramieh Gate; and the house where Bashir Shihab II once stayed. Located west of Saint George Cathedral, this quarter centers around a large pentagonal courtyard enclosed by historic houses and accessed through five gates. Most structures were built using stone, soil, wood, and brick, while numerous caves carved into the surrounding rock walls, accessible via roads and stairways, further enrich the area’s architectural heritage.

- Municipality
- Al Saray

In 1898, Governor Naum Coussa established a governmental seat in Amioun to house several administrative directorates, including a police station. The original location in the Al-Dar quarter soon provoked protests from local women, who objected to the constant passage of officers in front of their homes and to executions taking place nearby. In response, authorities relocated the seat to a site away from residential areas. The Saray Amioun was moved from the western Al-Dar quarter to its present location atop a hill in eastern Amioun, near the Cave of Saint Marina. Today, the Saray houses offices for Koura’s general security, a jail, a courthouse, the directorate general of real estate, the Koura directorate of urban planning, Electricity of Lebanon (Kadisha), and the National News Agency.

- Clock Tower

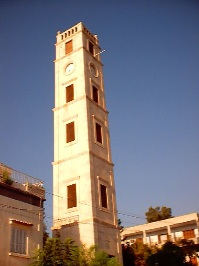
Amioun's clock tower

Constructed in 1958, this tower was designed to help farmers determine the time of day from their fields. The clock originally rang hourly bell chimes until the outbreak of the Lebanese civil war in 1975, when the bell was stolen. Following the war, the tower underwent restoration; however, local residents found the bell’s sound disruptive, particularly at night, and it was subsequently silenced.

- Chivarly House (Dar AL Fourousiya)
- Guest House (Bayt Al Diyafa)
- Al Ramieh Square

This large square, located at the southwestern gate of the old town, occupies the site of a former water reservoir. Originally a deep pit surrounded by carved stone walls, it served to collect rainfall and store water for the town’s residents. After the installation of a potable water system in the mid-twentieth century, the municipality filled in the pit and converted the area into a public square. Numerous caves are visible from the square, with additional rock-cut chambers incorporated into the nearby residential houses.

- Mar Semaan Quartier

Considered one of the oldest districts in Amioun, Mar Semaan immediately reveals its architectural diversity. Local tradition holds that some houses have remained unchanged since the Crusader period. The quarter is distinguished by numerous domes and windows, each topped with a unique inscription identifying the house’s owner and set above two raised stones, which serve as stands for flower pots. The balconies feature similar raised stones, longer in size, with inscriptions reminiscent of European Crusader designs. Many houses also include wells used to collect rainwater for domestic use.

- Russian School

With the support of the Imperial Orthodox Palestine Society, a school was established in Amioun in 1897, known as the Imperial Russian School. This school remained under Russian administration until the First World War, when the Russian imperial regime fell to the Soviet Bolsheviks. It was then taken over by the Charitable Association in Amioun—the oldest association in the town—which remained responsible for it until 1944, when it was handed over to the Lebanese state. During that period, it was known as the Association School. The building consisted of two floors topped with a tiled roof. Following the Ministry of National Education’s decision in 1931 to generalize public primary schools in district centers, and since Amioun is the center of the Koura District, the decision was applied there. Consequently, the Charitable Association School became an official school granting both the primary and intermediate certificates. It is worth noting that this school today comprises two intermediate schools: the first for boys, which is located on the same site as the former Russian School, and the second, to the west of the boys’ intermediate school, is the girls’ primary school.

- Cypriot Army Board

The Cyprus Regiment was a military unit of the British Army formed by the British government during the Second World War. It was composed primarily of volunteers from Cyprus, including Greek Cypriots, Turkish Cypriots, Armenian Cypriots, Maronite Cypriots, and Latins, and also included volunteers from other Commonwealth nationalities.

== Factories ==
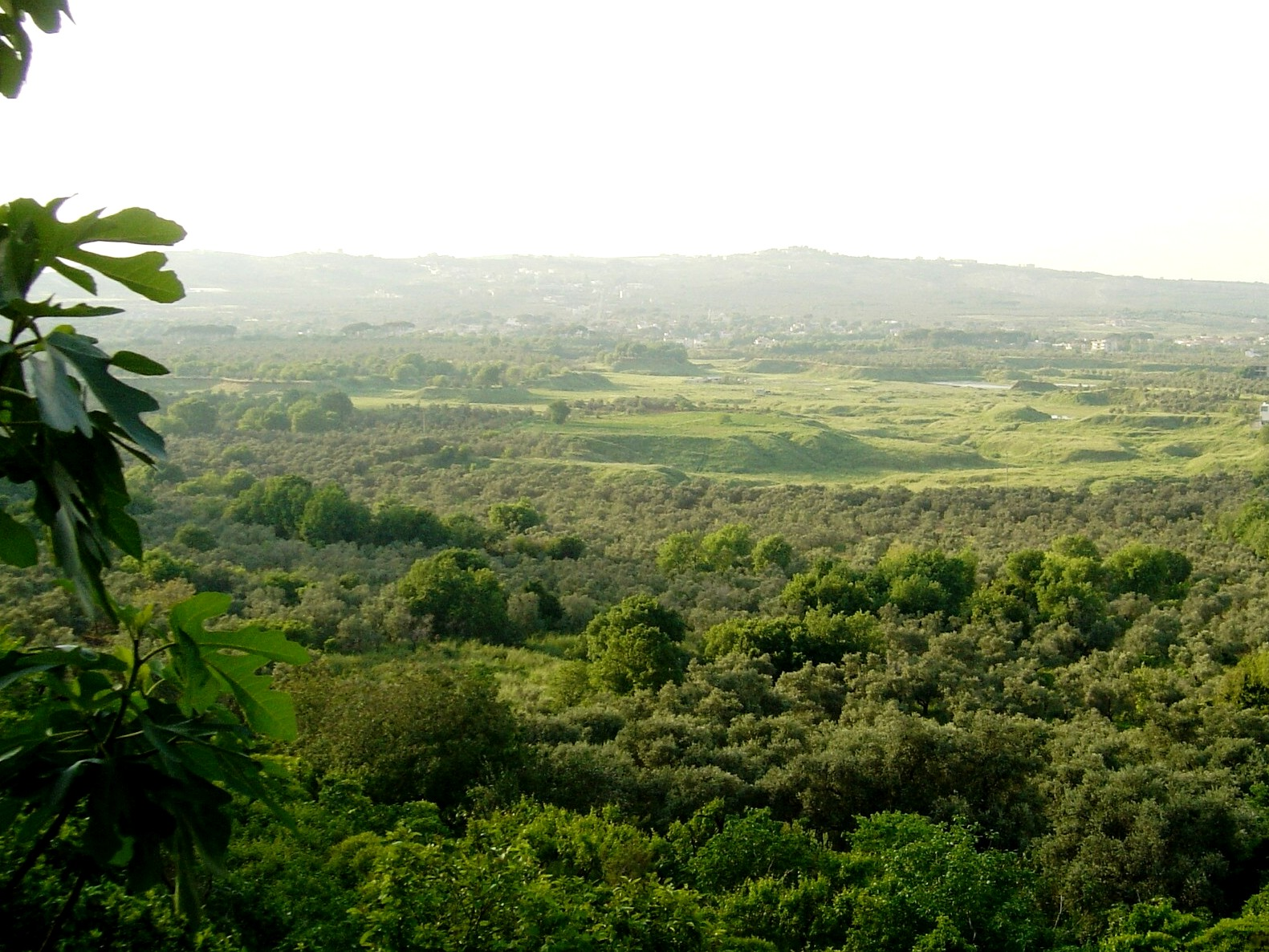
The olive trees plain as seen from Amioun's old town

- Saifan Olive Oil Factory
- Old-Fashioned Olive Oil Press
- Recycling Factory

== Notable people ==
- George N. Atiyeh, Lebanese American, former professor of History at the University of Puerto Rico and former head of the Near East Section of the Library of Congress.
- Caren Chammas, Lebanese Judoka who participated in the 2012 Summer Olympics.
- Ammianus Marcellinus, Roman Author.
- Jacques Nasser, Lebanese Australian former CEO of Ford Motor Company.
- Salim Saadeh, Lebanese former Member of the Lebanese Parliament.
- Nassim Nicholas Taleb, Lebanese American essayist, academic, statistician, former trader, and risk analyst.
- Antonius Ameuney, author (1821-1881).

== Twin towns and sister cities ==
Amioun is twinned with:

- Kalamata, Peloponnese, Greece.
- Meshchovsk, Kaluga Oblast, Russia.

== Additional information ==
Koura Villages
1. Aaba	2. Afsdik	3. Ain Akrine	4. Ali-al-Mouran
5. Amioun	6. Anfeh	7. Badebhoun	8. Barghoun
9. Barsa	10. Bdebba	11. Batroumine	12. Bishmizzine
13. Bhabouch	14. Bishriyata	15. Bkomra	16. Bneyel
17. Bohssas	18. Btourram	19. Btouratige	20. Bkeftine
21. Bnehran	22. Bsarma	23. Btaaboura	24. Bziza
25. Charlita	26. Chira	27. Dahr-al-Ain	28. Darbechtar
29. Darchmezzine	30. Deddeh	31. Fih	32. Ijdebrine
33. Kaftoun	34. Kifraya	35. Kelbata	36. Kelhat
37. Kfaraakka	38. Kfarhata	39. Kfarhazir	40. Kaferkahel
41. Kfarsaroun	42. Kousba	43. Maziriit Toula	44. Mitrit
45. Mijdel	46. Nakhleh	47. Rachedbine	48. Ras Maska
49. Ras Osta	50. Wata Fares	51. Zakroun	52. Zakzouk

== See also ==
- List of cities in Lebanon
- Lebanese Greek Orthodox Christians
- Greek Orthodox Church of Antioch
- University of Balamand

== Bibliography ==
- Abdou, Nagib T. Dr. Abdou’s Travels in America and Commercial Directory of the Arabic Speaking People of the World. Self-published, 1907–1908. Moise A. Khayrallah Center for Lebanese Diaspora Studies Archive, North Carolina State University.
- Abu-Husayn, Abdul-Rahim. Provincial Leaderships in Syria, 1575–1650. Beirut: American University of Beirut, 1985.
- Awit, Michel, and Bassam Lahoud. The Maronite Patriarchate: History & Mission. Lebanon: Arab Printing Press, 1996.
- Burnley, I. H. “Lebanese Migration and Settlement in Sydney, Australia.” International Migration Review 16, no. 1 (Spring 1982): 102–132.
- Çakar, Enver. Doğu Akdeniz Sahilinde Bir Osmanlı Sancağı: Trablus (1516–1579). Ankara: Türk Tarih Kurumu Yayınları, 2012.
- Chlela, Carla. Medieval Rural Settlements in North Lebanon 12th and 13th centuries. PhD thesis, Pázmány Péter Catholic University, 2023. doi:10.15774/PPKE.BTK.2025.002.
- Duaihi, Jamil El-. A Glimpse into the History of Ehden: The Most Legendary Ehdenian Battles (2000 BC–1976). Beirut: n.p., 2015.
- Gibbon, Edward. The History of the Decline and Fall of the Roman Empire. London: Methuen & Co., 1898.
- Haider, M., Iamoni, M. "The Rediscovery of Amioun, ancient Ammiya. The Archaeology of a Regional Capital in the Inner Plain of Koura (Lebanon)" Rivista di Studi Fenici (2021): 53–78.
- Hitti, Philip K. Lebanon in History from the Earliest Times to the Present. London: Macmillan & Co. Ltd., 1957.
- Immerzeel, Mat, and Bas Snelders. “Church Embellishment in Medieval Egypt, Syria, and Cyprus: Patronage and Identity.” In Art and Material Culture in the Byzantine and Islamic Worlds, 137–174. Leiden: Brill, 2011.
- L’architecture religieuse du patriarcat orthodoxe d’Antioche (ARPOA). Research project directed by May Davie.
- MidEastMed – A Regional History of Medicine in the Middle East. Research project funded by the European Research Council and led by Prof. Liat Kozma
- Mission de Phénicie dirigée par Ernest Renan. Ernest Renan, ed. Paris: Imprimerie Impériale, 1864.
- Mokarzel, Salloum, and H.F. Otash. The Syrian Business Directory: First Edition 1908–1909. Moise A. Khayrallah Center for Lebanese Diaspora Studies Archive, North Carolina State University, 1908–1909.
- Monasteries of the Antiochian Orthodox Patriarchate. Tripoli: University of Balamand Publications, 2007.
- Nicholls, David. Haiti in Caribbean Context: Ethnicity, Economy and Revolt. Basingstoke: Macmillan in association with St Antony’s College, Oxford, 1985.
- Passenger List The Statue of Liberty - Ellis Island Foundation.
- Raheb, Abdallah. Conception of the Union in the Orthodox Patriarchate of Antioch. Thesis, [Beirut], [1981].
- Ramirez Carrillo, Luis Alfonso. "...De cómo los libaneses conquistaron la Península de Yucatán". Migración, identidad étnica y cultura empresarial. Mérida, UNAM, CEPHCIS, 2012.
- Rein, Raanan and Ariel Noyjovich. Peronism as a Big Tent: The Political Inclusion of Arab Immigrants in Argentina. Montreal: McGill-Queen’s University Press, 2022.
- “Requisición de Nacionalidad 1882–1914.” Archival/legal document.
- Winter, Stefan. The Shiites of Lebanon under Ottoman Rule, 1516–1788. Cambridge: Cambridge University Press, 2010.
