= Darbechtar =

Village in Koura District, Lebanon

Darbechtar دار بعشتار
- Village
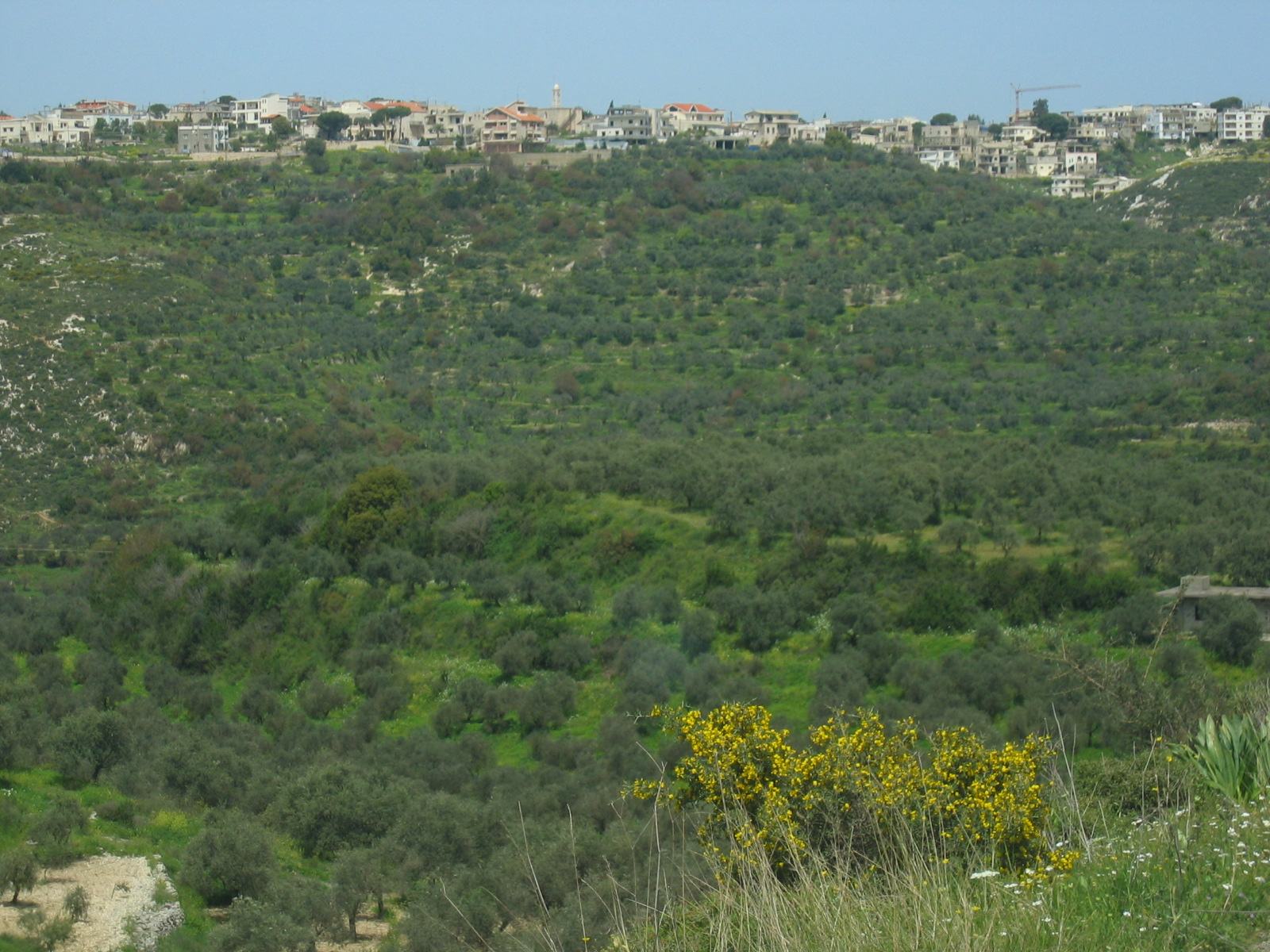
- View of Darbechtar.

- Location within Lebanon
- Coordinates: 34°16′06″N 35°47′37″E
- Country: Lebanon
- Governorate: North Governorate
- District: Koura District
- Elevation: 300 m (980 ft)
- Time zone: UTC+2 (EET)
  - Summer (DST): UTC+3 (EEST)
- Dialing code: +961

Darbechtar (Arabic: دار بعشتار), also known as Darb Ishtar, is a village located on the south-eastern periphery of the Koura District in the North Governorate of the Republic of Lebanon.

Darbechtar borders the villages of Amioun, Bziza, Mijdel, Kaftoun, and Darchmezzine. The Village is particularly famous for the Chalouhi, Bou Ghosn, Zoughbi, and other families.

The Lebanese hailing from Darbechtar number 10,000 worldwide. 85% of them live outside Lebanon, mainly in France, Brazil, Argentina, Australia, Canada, the United States.

The population of Darbechtar is Maronite Christian.

== Etymology ==
The name of the village is derivative of the Aramaic words, Dar and Ishtar, meaning the House of Astarte. It is believed that the village was the site of an ancient Phoenician shrine for the Goddess of Fertility.)

== Demographics ==
In 2014, Christians made up 99.57% of registered voters in Darbechtar. 92.25% of the voters were Maronite Catholics.

== Climate ==
Darbechtar : Mediterranean plain village with heavy rains, mild winters and hot dry arid summers.

Min / Max average temperatures in Celsius Degree
Jan (8/16) Feb (9/16) Mar (10/19) Apr (13/22) May (16/25) Jun (19/27) Jul (22/29) Aug (23/30) Sep (20/29) Oct (17/27) Nov (13/22) Dec (10/18)

== Environment ==
The village is the home of Olive oil production. Therefore, most of the village is planted with the ever green Olive Trees along with Grapes, Figs, variety of bushes, plants, and flowers.)

=== Olive oil extraction ===
Traditionally, olive oil was produced by crushing olives in stone or wooden mortars or beam presses. Nowadays, olives are ground to tiny bits, obtaining a paste that is mixed with water and processed by a centrifuge, which extracts the oil from the paste, leaving behind pomace.)

=== Uses of the Olive Fruit ===
Olive Oil is used in cooking, cosmetics, pharmaceuticals, and soaps, and as a fuel for traditional oil lamps. Olive oil is a healthful oil because of its high content of monounsaturated fat (mainly oleic acid) and polyphenols.)

== Places of worship ==
There are 4 places of Christian worship in Darbechtar mainly Churches:

- Church of Saint George
- Church of Saint Elias
- Church of Saint Chalita
- Church of our Lady of Saydeh
- Church of St Joseph

== Photo gallery ==
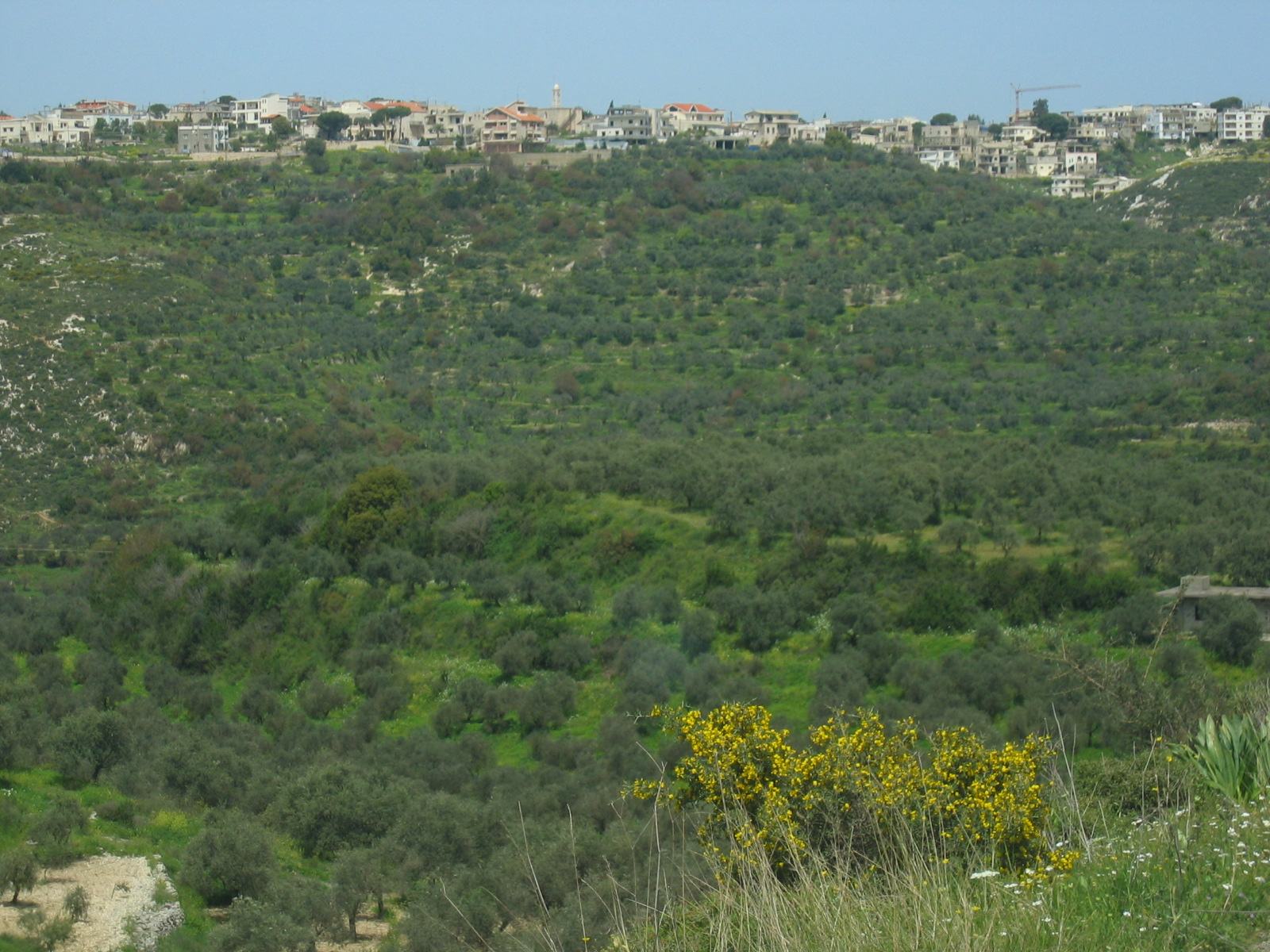
View of Darbechtar.

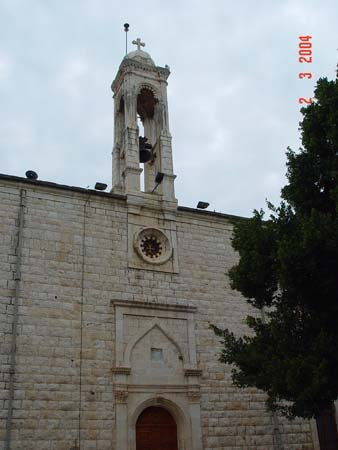
This is the Church of St. Georges.

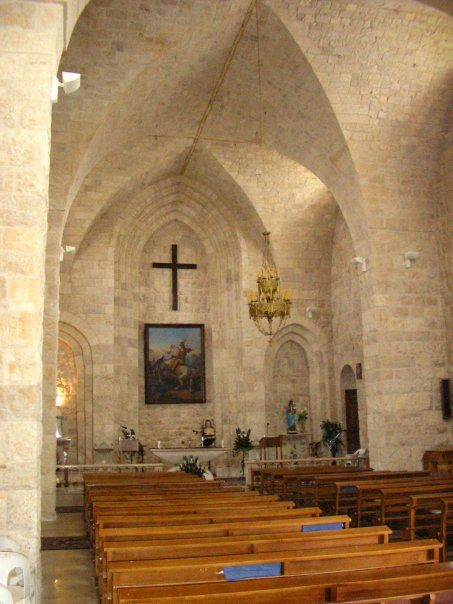
This is the interior of the Church of St. Georges.

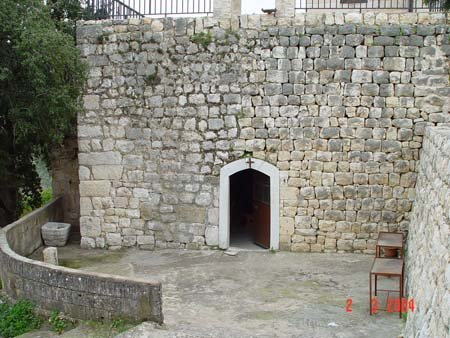
This is the Church of Saydeh.

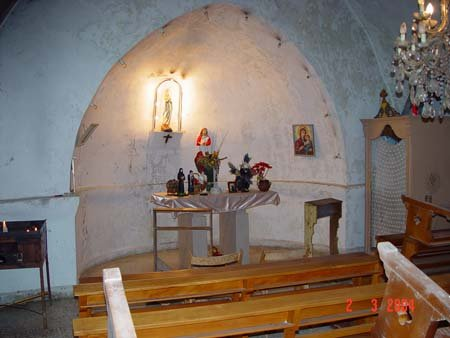
This is the interior of the Church of Saydeh.

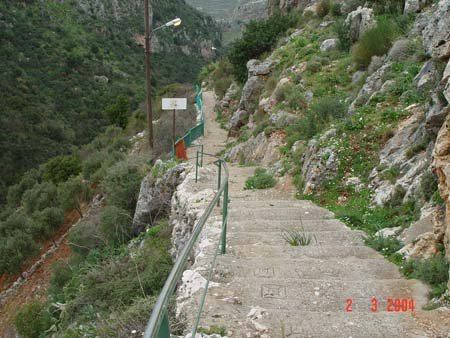
This is the way leading to the Cave of St. Elias.

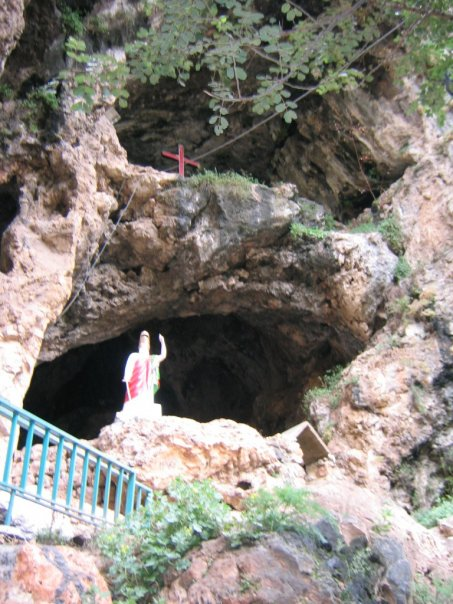
This is the Cave of St. Elias.

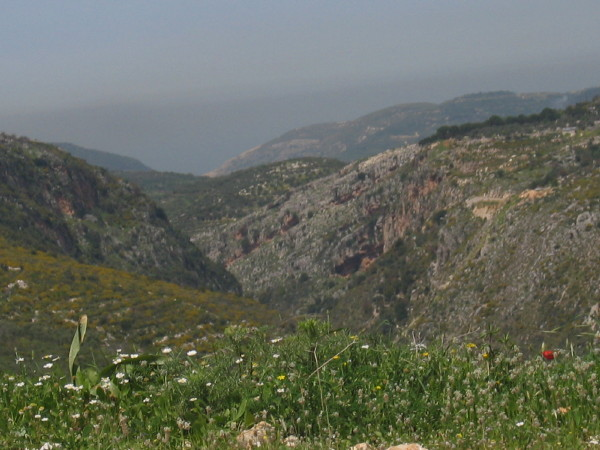
This is the Valley of St. Elias. The Cave of St. Elias is located in this Valley.

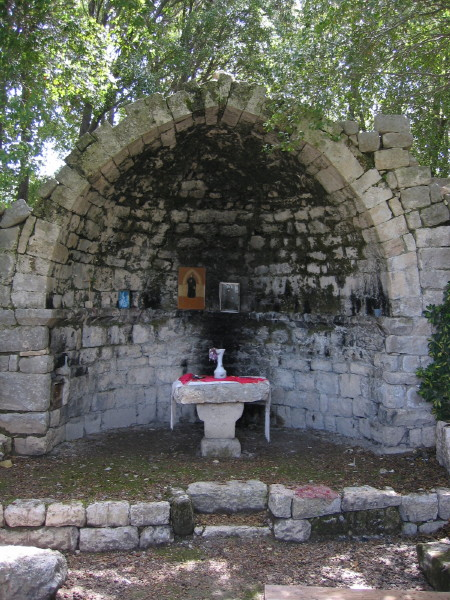
This is the Church of Mar Chalita.

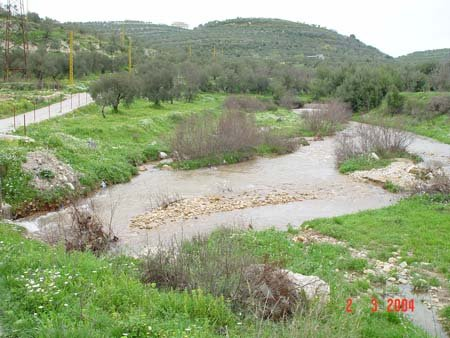
Naher el Asfour.

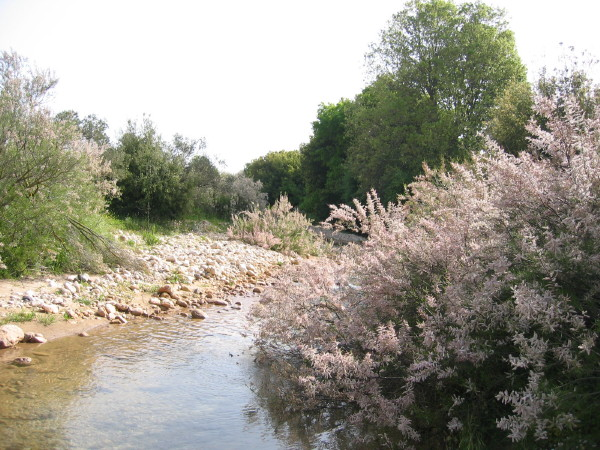
Naher el Asfour.

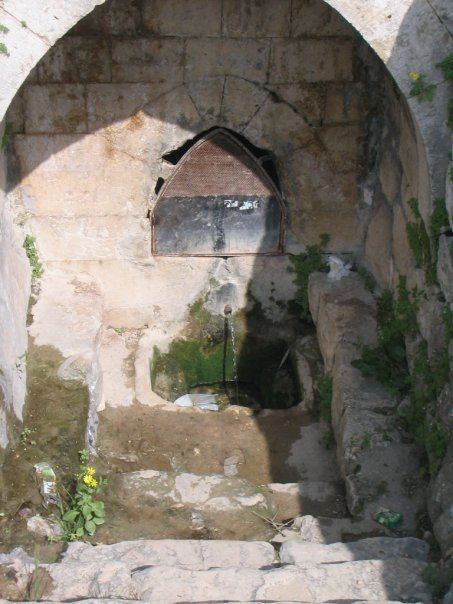
You can find a spring water outlet below ground level.

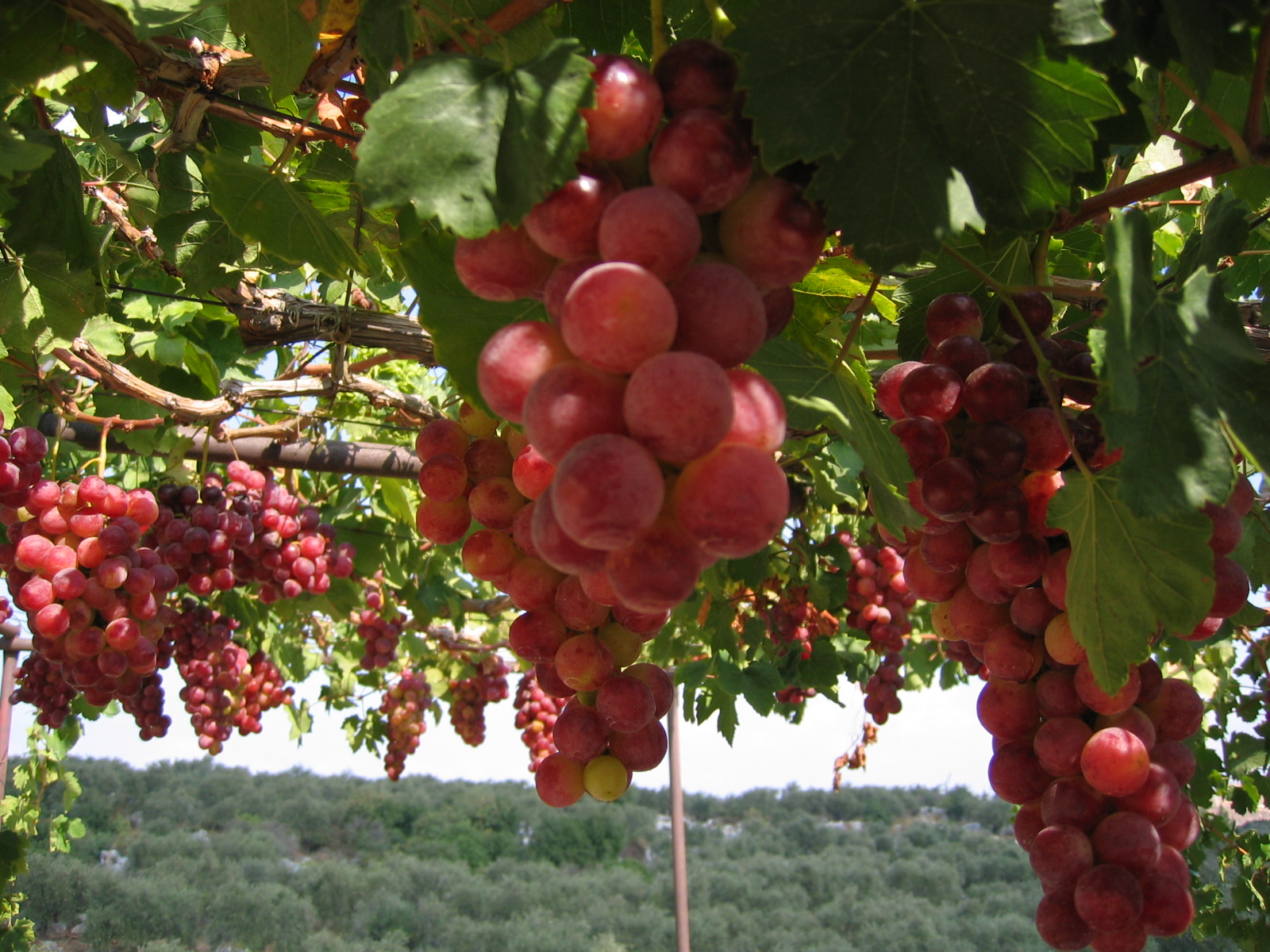
Delicious Grapes.

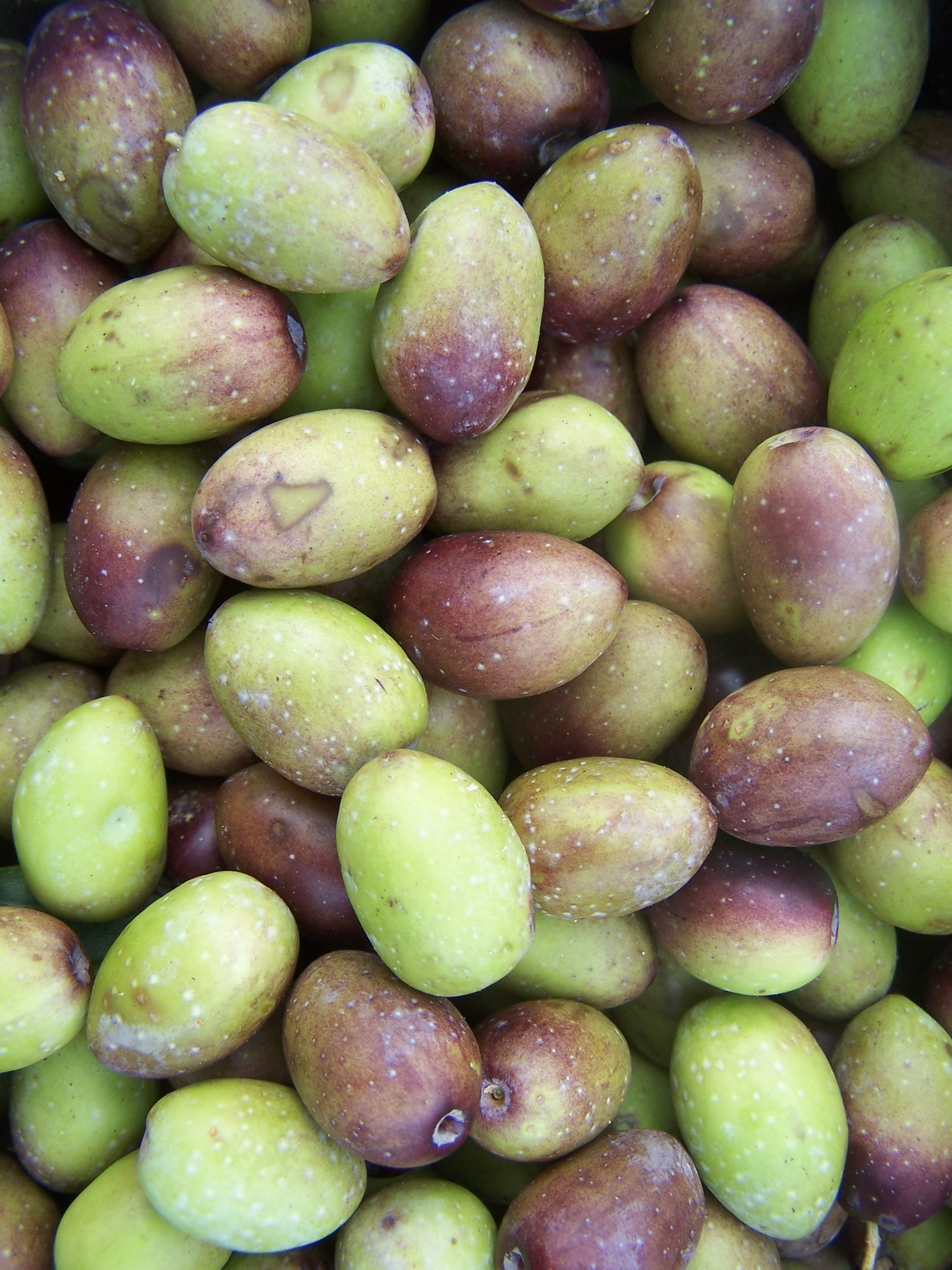
The Olive Fruit.

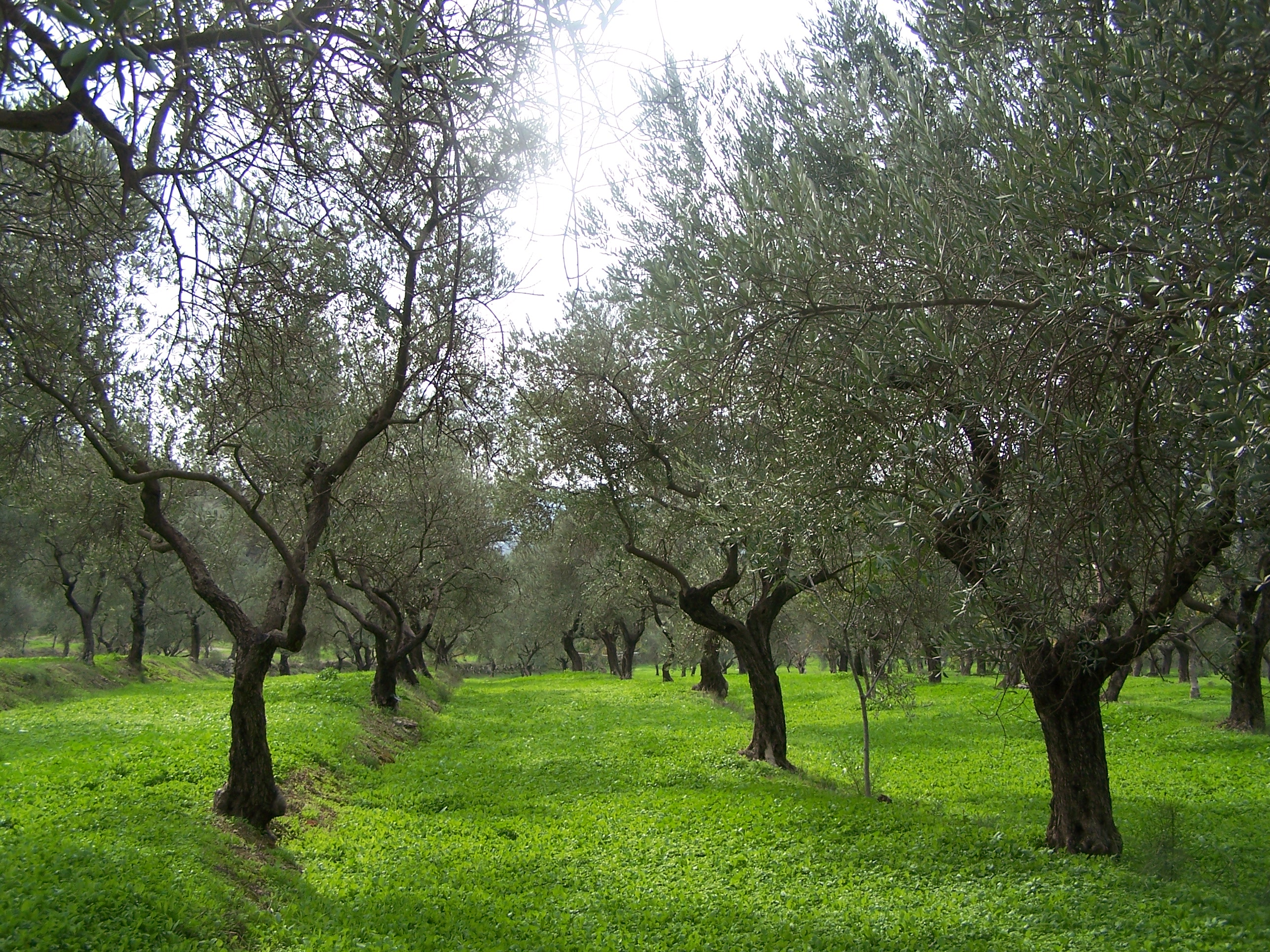
Green Olive Tree Field.

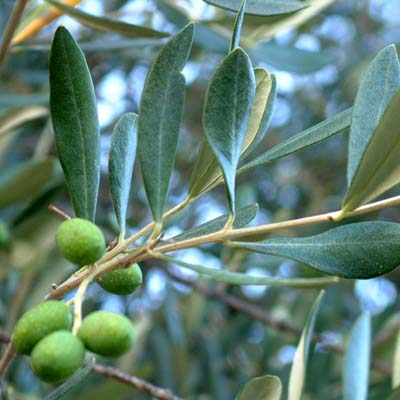
The Olive Fruit.

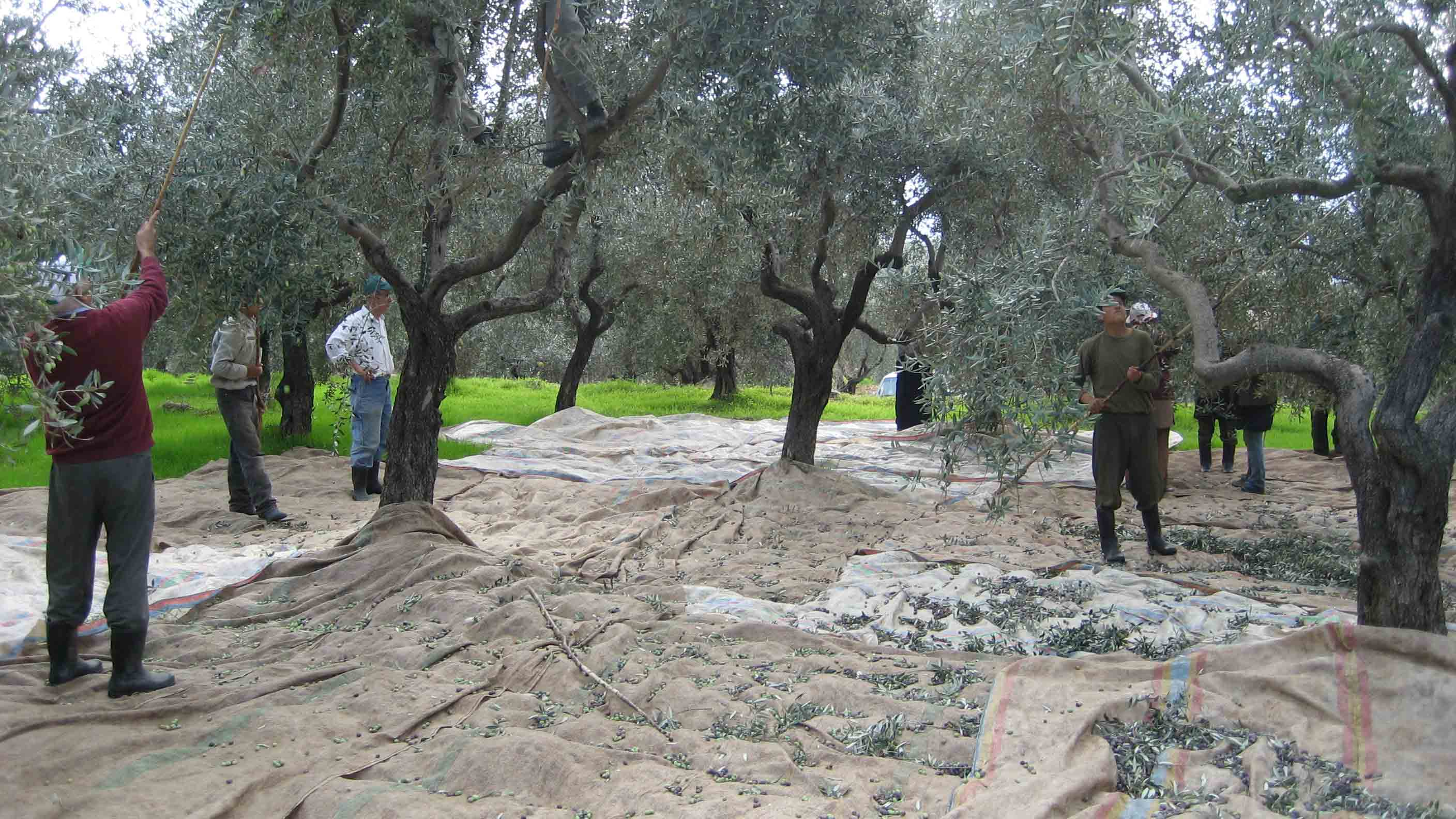
The Olive Fruit Harvest.
