= George N. Atiyeh =

Lebanese librarian and scholar (1923–2008)

George N. Atiyeh (1923 – April 21, 2008) was a Lebanese librarian and scholar. He was head of the Near East Section of the Library of Congress from 1967 to 1994.

== Life and career ==
Atiyeh was born in Amioun, Lebanon in 1923, and received a master's degree from the American University of Beirut in 1950, and a doctorate in the history of philosophy from the University of Chicago in 1954. Atiyeh taught at the University of Puerto Rico from 1954 to 1967. In 1967, he left Puerto Rico for Washington, D.C. to head the Near East division of the Library of Congress. During his tenure there, he increased the library's Arab and Muslim collection from 15,000 to over 250,000 volumes. He was a founding member of the Middle East Librarians Association (MELA), and in 1999, MELA honored him by creating the George Atiyeh Prize to offer financial support for Library science graduate students to attend MELA meetings.
