= Nakhleh =

Town in Koura District, Lebanon

Coordinates: 34.3648°N 35.8269°E

Nakhleh نخلة
- Village
- Location within Lebanon
- Country: Lebanon
- Governorate: North
- District: Koura

Nakhleh (Arabic: نخلة) is a town in the Koura District of Lebanon. It is 340 meters above sea level, has an area of 8 square kilometers, with more than 10,000 residents.

== Demographics ==
In 2014, Muslims made up 79.97% and Christians made up 18.55% of registered voters in Nakhleh. 78.90% of the voters were Sunni Muslims and 16.67% were Maronite Catholics.
