= Aaba =

Village in Koura District, Lebanon

Coordinates: 34°21′N 35°50′E

Aaba عابا
- Village
- Location within Lebanon
- Country: Lebanon
- Governorate: North
- District: Koura

Aaba (Arabic: عابا, romanized: ʿĀbā) is a village in the Koura District of Lebanon. It is located 240 meters above sea level and covers 0.16 square kilometers. In 1953, Aaba had a population of 288 living in 31 households. By 2017, the town had 807 registered voters, of whom 698 were Greek Orthodox, 62 were Sunni, and 47 were Maronite.
