= Ain Akrine =

Maronite village in Koura District, Lebanon

Coordinates: 34.2856°N 35.8467°E

Ain Akrine عين عكرين
- City
- Location within Lebanon
- Country: Lebanon
- Governorate: North Governorate
- District: Koura District

Area
  - Total: 1.162 km^{2} (0.449 sq mi)

Population
  - Total: 96
  - Density: 83/km^{2} (210/sq mi)
- Time zone: UTC+2 (EET)
  - Summer (DST): UTC+3 (EEST)
- Dialing code: +961

Ain Akrine (Arabic: عين عكرين, romanized: ʿAyn ʿAkrīn), also spelled Ain Aakrine, is a Maronite village in Koura District of Lebanon. It was established in the early 19th century.

== History ==
Before the 19th century, the land on which Ain Akrine stands today, was owned by AL HAJJ Youssef from Bnehrane. Following a dispute between two brothers, the family of EL KHOURY Ibrahim migrated from Kfarshakhna and settled in Ain Akrine. During the Ottoman occupation, a group of Christians lived in this town to escape oppression. The village is also known as Nawous Town. In 1953, Ain Akrine had a population of 242 living in 36 households.

== Demographics ==
In 2014 Christians made up 99.65% of registered voters in Ain Akrine. 93.39% of the voters were Maronite Catholics.
