= Erica Cruikshank Dodd =

Canadian art historian (born 1928)

- Born: 1928; Beirut, Lebanon
- Education: B.A. in History of Art Wellesley College, Massachusetts (1951); PhD in Byzantine Art at the Courtauld Institute of Art, University of London (1958); post-doctoral training in Islamic Art at the Centre for Middle East Studies, at Harvard University between 1960 and 1963
- Known for: art historian, academic
- Spouse: Peter C. Dodd (1930–2010)

Erica Cruikshank Dodd (née Cruikshank; born 1928) is a Canadian academic who has published several studies on Byzantine, Middle Eastern and Islamic art. She was Professor of Byzantine and Islamic Art at American University of Beirut, Lebanon, and at the University of Victoria, British Columbia, Canada.

== Life ==
Erica Cruikshank was born in Beirut, Lebanon, within an academic family. She grew up in the family home that her father, Dr. W. D. Cruikshank, who was Professor of Surgery at the American University of Beirut, had built on the AUB campus.

She graduated from Wellesley College, Massachusetts, with a B.A. in History of Art in 1951, and earned a PhD in Byzantine Art at the Courtauld Institute of Art, University of London, in 1958. She then went on to undertake post-doctoral training in Islamic Art at the Centre for Middle East Studies, at Harvard University between 1960 and 1963.

She married Peter C. Dodd (1930–2010), an academic who, like her, taught at the American University of Beirut for 20 years from 1965 to 1985. They had four children together. She lived for many years in Pakistan, where her husband was the Director of the Fulbright Foundation in Islamabad, and worked as an unpaid assistant for the Foundation from 1989 to 1996.

== Academic career ==
After teaching art history for 20 years at the American University of Beirut, she became Senior Fellow at Dumbarton Oaks Centre for Byzantine Studies at Harvard University, Washington, D.C., from 1986 to 1987 and visiting professor of Islamic and Byzantine Art at the Department of History of Art, University of Victoria, Canada, from 1987 to 1989.

During the time she was based in Pakistan, she worked as a lecturer at the Centre for Intensive English Language Studies in Islamabad between 1992 and 1993.

In 1997 she became adjunct professor of the Department of History of Art, University of Victoria, Victoria, BC, Canada and in the same year she was appointed Fellow and then Associate Fellow at the Centre for the Study of Religion and Society, University of Victoria, Canada.

=== Medieval Lebanese Frescoes ===
Cruikshank's book Medieval paintings in the Lebanon has been praised by Robin Cormak, writing in Speculum, as “an invaluable contribution toward the description of what remains in that region”. The book contains photographs of paintings in religious buildings in the Lebanese region collected over a period of 33 years (1971–2004). Of particular importance are the photographs of 1971, which represent a “record of lost paintings”, as most of these deteriorated over the years it took for her research to complete. As Cormak wrote in Speculum, it is "a matter of considerable satisfaction that the key monuments are now accessible in the art-historical literature”.

=== Islamic Art and Architecture ===
Cruikshank's book, The Image of the Word: A Study of Quranic Verses in Islamic Architecture, contains a collection of 4000 Quranic inscriptions on Islamic buildings. Its publication was received “with gratitude” by the International Journal of the Middle East Studies, which recognized the value of a work “long overdue” and acknowledged ”the herculean nature of the task”.

== Bibliography ==
=== Selected works ===
- Byzantine Silver Stamps by Erica Cruikshank Dodd. With an excursus on the Comes sacrarum largitionum by J.P.C. Kent. Washington : Dumbarton Oaks Research Library and Collection; Cambridge, Mass.; printed in Glückstadt: Trustees for Harvard University, 1961. British Library General Reference Collection W.P.14450/7.
- The Image of the Word : A Study of Quranic Verses in Islamic Architecture by Erica Cruikshank Dodd and Shereen Khairallah. Beirut: American University of Beirut, c1981. British library General Reference Collection X:425/4938
- Medieval Painting in the Lebanon by Erica Cruikshank Dodd; photographs by Raif Nassif; Syriac inscriptions by Amir Harrak; architectural plans by George Michell and Jean Yasmine. Wiesbaden: Reichert, 2004. British library General Reference Collection LD.31.b.300
- "On the Origins of Medieval Dinanderie: the Equestrian Statue in Islam," Art Bulletin, LI, 1969, 220–232.
- "Notes on the Monastery of Mar Musa al-Habashi, Near Nebek, Syria," British Archaeological Reports, BAR International Series, 152, 1982, 167–189.
- "Three Byzantine Silver Crosses," Dumbarton Oaks Papers, XLI (1987), 165–179
- "The Question of Workshop: Evidence of the Stamps on the Sion Treasure" and " The Location of Silver Stamping: Evidence from Newly Discovered Stamps," Ecclesiastical Silver Plate in Sixth-Century Byzantium, eds., Susan A. Boyd and Marlia Mundell Mango, Dumbarton Oaks, Washington, D.C., 1993, pp. 57–63, 217–223.
- "Mar Tadros, Bahdeidat. Paintings in a Lebanese Church from the Thirteenth Century", Journal of the Canadian Society for Syriac Studies, 1 (2001), pp. 61–84.
