= Bohssas =

Maronite village in Koura District, Lebanon

Bohssas بحصاص
- Village
- Country: Lebanon
- Governorate: North
- District: Koura

Bohssas (Arabic: بحصاص), also spelled Behsas, is a Maronite village in the Koura District of Lebanon. As of 2014, the town had 157 registered voters.

== Demographics ==
In 2014, Christians made up 96.18% of registered voters in Bohssas. 84.71% of the voters were Maronite Catholics and 8.28% were Greek Orthodox.
