= Eduardo Jozami =

Argentine academic, human rights activist and journalist (1939–2024)

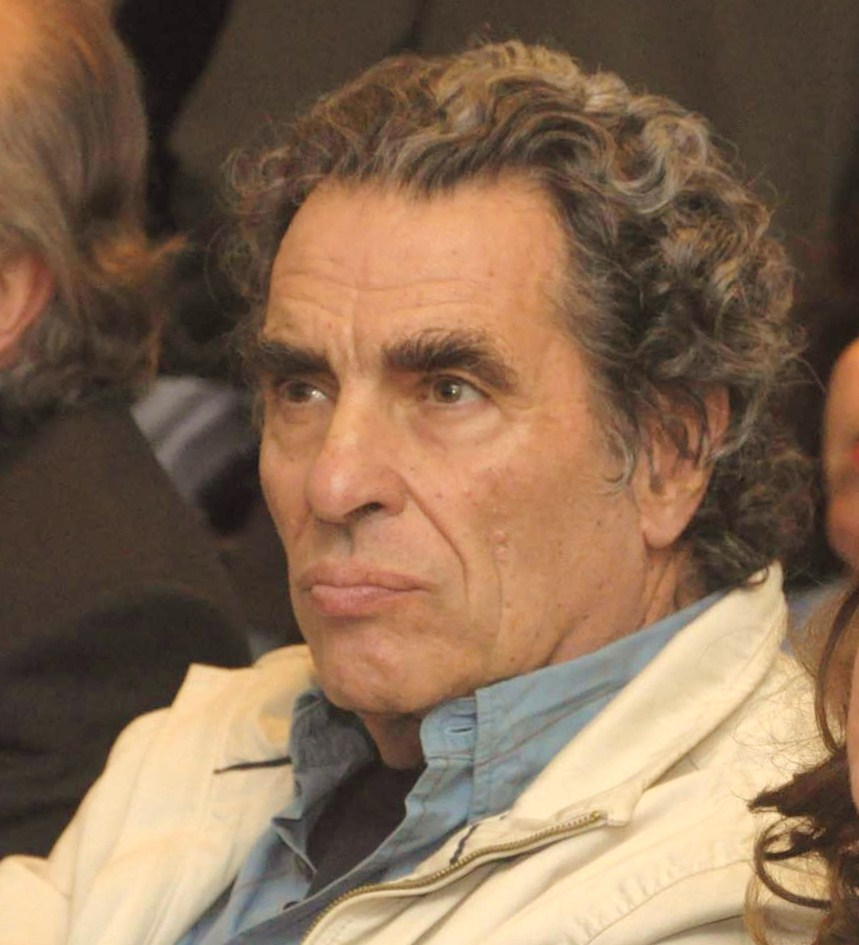
- Jozami in 2011

Member of the Buenos Aires City Legislature
- In office 10 December 1993 – 10 December 1997

Member of the Argentine Chamber of Deputies
- In office 10 December 1997 – 7 August 2000
- Constituency: City of Buenos Aires

Undersecretary of Housing of the City of Buenos Aires
- In office 7 August 2000 – 20 March 2002
- Government Chief: Aníbal Ibarra
- Preceded by: Oscar Bouzo
- Succeeded by: Carlos Grinberg

Personal details
- Born: 13 October 1939 Buenos Aires, Argentina
- Died: 27 September 2024 (aged 84) Buenos Aires, Argentina
- Party: CPA (1962); Broad Front; Justicialist
- Occupation: Academic, human rights activist, journalist, political prisoner

Eduardo Jozami (13 October 1939 – 27 September 2024) was an Argentine academic, human rights activist, journalist, political prisoner and politician. A member of the Communist Party of Argentina, the Broad Front and the Justicialist Party, he served in the Buenos Aires City Legislature from 1993 to 1997 and in the Argentine Chamber of Deputies from 1997 to 2000.

Jozami died on 27 September 2024 in Buenos Aires, at the age of 84.
