= Darchmezzine =

Human settlement in Koura District, Lebanon

Darchmezzine دار شمزين
- Village
- Location within Lebanon
- Coordinates: 34°17′24.0″N 35°47′02.4″E
- Country: Lebanon
- Governorate: North Governorate
- District: Koura District

Area
  - Total: 343 ha (850 acres)
- Elevation: 390 m (1,280 ft)

Population
  - Total: 325
- Time zone: UTC+2 (EET)
  - Summer (DST): UTC+3 (EEST)
- Area code: +961

Darchmezzine (Arabic: دار شمزين, romanized: Dār Shmezzīn), also spelled Darchmizzine, Dar Chmezzine or Dar Chmizzine, is a Lebanese local authority which is located in the Koura District, an administrative division of the North Governorate of Lebanon. The municipality is member of the Federation of Koura Municipalities. In 1953, Darchmezzine had a population of 133 living in 30 households.

== Geography ==
Darchmezzine is located south of the town of Amioun and approximately 80 kilometers away north-northeast of Beirut. Situated between the sea and the mountains, Darchmezzine is characterized by a quiet rural atmosphere, a distinctive scenic view and a moderate Mediterranean climate. The area is rich of olive trees and orchards.

== Demographics ==
In 2014, Christians made up 98.98% of registered voters in Darchmezzine. 80.46% of the voters were Greek Orthodox and 16.50% were Maronite Catholics.
