= Kaftoun =

Village in Koura District, Lebanon

Kaftoun كَفْتُون
- Village
- Location within Lebanon
- Coordinates: 34°16′N 35°46′E
- Country: Lebanon
- Governorate: North Governorate
- District: Koura District
- Time zone: UTC+2 (EET)
  - Summer (DST): UTC+3 (EEST)
- Dialing code: +961
- Website: http://www.kaftoun.com/

Kaftoun (Arabic: كَفْتُون, romanized: Kaftūn) is a small Lebanese village located along the north bank of the Walnut River, in the Koura District of the North Governorate of Lebanon. The population of the village is approximately three-hundred, spread around seventy-four houses. They are mostly Greek Orthodox.

== Etymology ==
The name "Kaftoun" in the ancient Aramaic language means "dug from" or "sculpted from" a cliff and also (Kftuna) could means "the domed". Both roots of the word lead us to believe that the village of Kaftoun was named after the domed Theotokos Monastery which is carved in the red rock cliffs by the banks of Nahr al-Jaouz.

== Demographics ==
In 2014; Christians made up 98.92% of registered voters in Kaftoun. 90.28% of the voters were Greek Orthodox.

== Churches ==
Kaftoun has three historic churches: Saint Phocas Church (Mar Foka's), the Church of Saint Sergius and Bacchus (Mar Sarkis) 6th century, and the most famed Theotokos Monastery, which houses a two-sided Byzantine icon from the 11th century.
