= Mijdel =

Maronite village in Koura District, Lebanon

Coordinates: 34.2523°N 35.7937°E

Mijdel مجدل
- Village
- Location within Lebanon
- Country: Lebanon
- Governorate: North
- District: Koura

Mijdel (Arabic: مجدل), also spelled Majdel, is a Maronite village in the Koura District of Lebanon.

== Demographics ==
In 2014, Christians made up 99.53% of registered voters in Mijdel. 91.19% of the voters were Maronite Catholics.
