= Bziza =

Village in Koura District, Lebanon

Coordinates: 34°16′N 35°49′E

Bziza بزيزا
- Village
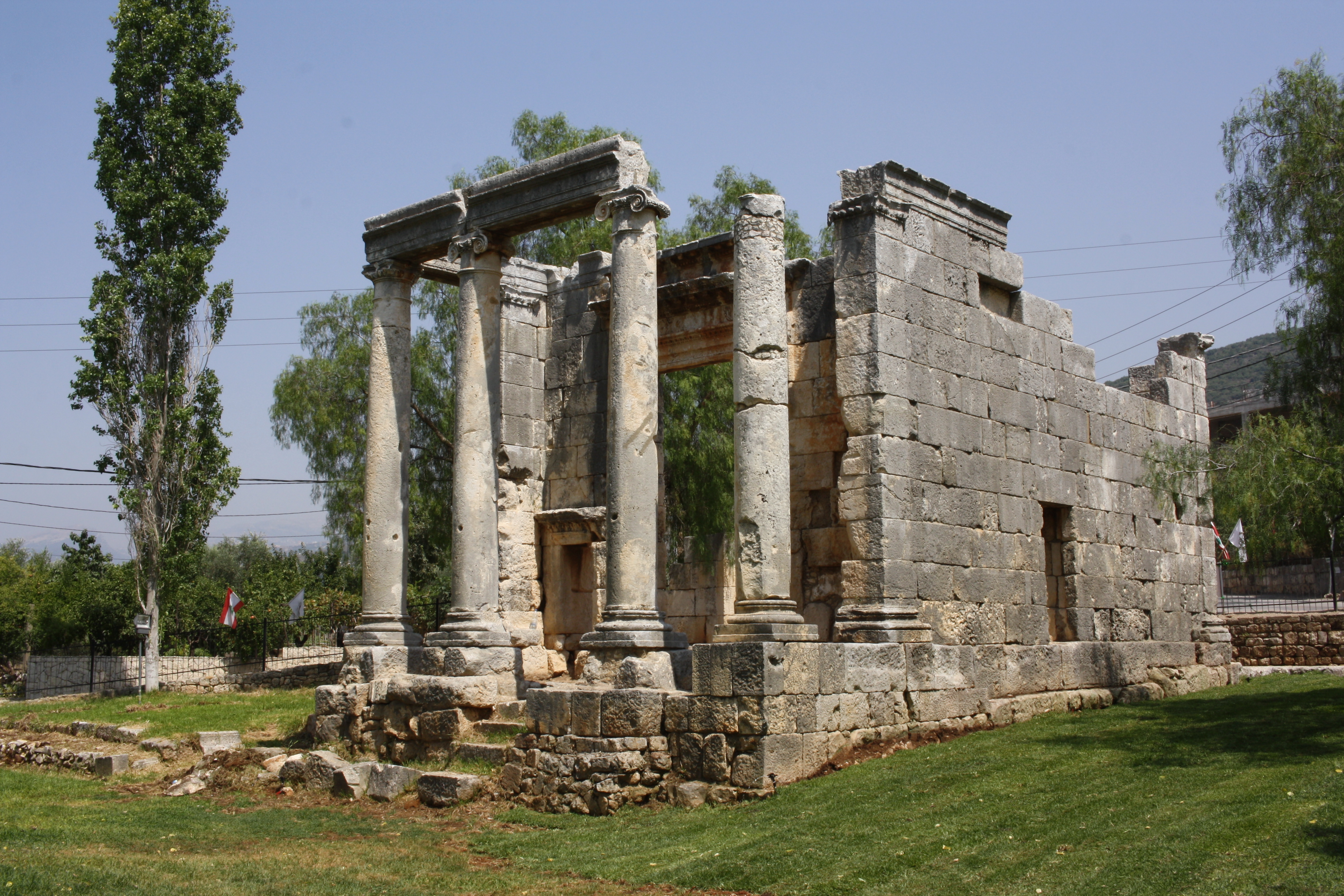
- Temple of Bziza

- Location within Lebanon
- Country: Lebanon
- Governorate: North
- District: Koura

Bziza (Arabic: بزيزا, romanized: Bzīzā) is a village in the Koura District of Lebanon. There is a well-preserved Roman temple with three of its frontal portico columns still standing. In Byzantine times a two-apse church known as Our Lady of the Columns was built within its walls. The population of the town was 348 in 1953.

== Demographics ==
In 2014, Christians made up 82.38% and Muslims made up 17.53% of registered voters in Bziza. 61.86% of the voters were Marotine Catholics, 19.21% were Greek Orthodox, 12.37% were Sunni Muslims and 5.15% were Shiite Muslims.
