= Dreib =

Dreib (Arabic: الدريب) is an area that gathers Lebanese villages in Akkar District in Akkar Governorate.

== Villages ==
- Aamaret El Baykat
- Aaouainat
- Ain Ez Zayt
- Ain Tinta
- Al-Furaydis
- Al-Qoubaiyat
- Andaket
- Aydamun
- Berbara
- Bireh
- Chadra
- Charbila
- Cheikh Aayach
- Cheikhlar
- Daghleh
- Dahr El Qanbar
- Daoussa - Baghdadi
- Debbabiyeh
- Deir Jannine
- Dibbabiye
- Douair Aadouiyeh
- El Hedd
- El Qorne
- Ghazaleh
- Haouchab
- Haytla
- Kfar Harra
- Kherbet Char
- Khirbet Daoud
- Kouachra
- Machta Hassan
- Menjez
- Nahriyeh - Boustane El Herch
- Naoura
- Qarha
- Qochloq
- Qraiyat
- Rihaniyeh
- Rmah
- Sarar
- Sfinet Ed Drayb
- Sindianet Zeidan
- Tall Hmayra
- Tleil
- Wadi El Haour
