= Jouma =

Village area in Akkar district, Lebanon

Jouma (Arabic: جومة) is an area that gathers Lebanese villages in Akkar District in Akkar Governorate.

== Villages ==
- Aaiyat
- Ain Yaaqoub
- Akkar al-Atika
- Beino - Qboula
- Beit Mellat
- Bezbina
- Borj
- Chakdouf
- Chittaha
- Dahr Laissineh
- Daoura
- Ilat
- Jebrayel
- Memnaa
- Rahbeh
- Tachaa
- Tikrit
