= Qaitea =

Qaitea (Arabic: القيطع) is an area that gathers Lebanese villages in Akkar District in Akkar Governorate.

== Villages ==
- Aayoun El Ghizlane
- Ain El Zehab
- Bebnine
- Beit Ayoub
- Beit El Haouch
- Beit Younes
- Berkail
- Borj El Aarab
- Bqerzla
- Bzal
- Chane
- Deir Dalloum
- Denbo
- Fneidik
- Habchit
- Houaich
- Hrar
- Jdaidet El Qaitea
- Karkaf
- Kherbet El Jord
- Mahmra
- Majdala
- Mar Touma
- Mbarkiyeh
- Mish Mish
- Ouadi Ej Jamous
- Qabeit
- Qardaf
- Qloud El Baqieh
- Sayssouq
- Sfinet El Qayteaa
- Wadi Jamous
- Zouq El Hassineh
- Zouq El Hbalsa
- Zouq Haddara
