= Chadra, Lebanon =

Chadra شدرا
- Village
- Location within Lebanon
- Coordinates: 34°37′06″N 36°19′14″E
- Country: Lebanon
- Governorate: Akkar
- District: Akkar

Government
  - Type: Municipality
  - Mayor: Alaa khalil

Area
  - Total: 6.51 km^{2} (2.51 sq mi)
- Elevation: 500 m (1,600 ft)

Population
  - Total: 4 200 (in 2,025)
  - Density: 0.61/km^{2} (1.6/sq mi)
- Time zone: UTC+2 (EET)
  - Summer (DST): UTC+3 (EEST)
- Postal code: 3235
- Dialing code: +961
- Website: http://www.chadraapp.com/

Chadra (Arabic: شدرا) is a village in Akkar Governorate, Lebanon.

The population is Greek Orthodox and a small percentage of its population are Catholics. The village is situated at a distance of 146 km from Beirut at an altitude of 450 m above sea level. It has an area of 6.51 km^{2} (651 hectares), surrounded by Owaniat from the west, Wadi Khaled from the east, from the north, Machta Hassan and from the south, Andaket.

Can be accessed in two ways:

1. Halba - bire aakar - Kobayat - Andeket-Chadra.
2. Aabdeh - mqaitaa - al Aaboudiye - munjiz- Chadra.

Chadra is characterized by a mild summer and winter climate and several archaeological sites, most notably the remnants of seven old grinders. It was an old centre to group the armies and was considered a center catering to them, as it was a home of one of the conquests of Prince Fakhr al-Din.

The residents originally from this village are predominantly doctors of medicine, teachers, soldiers and officers in the Lebanese army (General Wehbe Katicha, former parliament member and General Jean El Atrach, commander of the Lebanese Commando Regiment, General Ghazi Ghattas, Yousef al jadam (etc.). Officers and engineers are notable residents from Chadra).

In Chadra, the main political party is the Free Patriotic Movement and it focuses on promoting the interests of the people in the area and works for positive changes in the community. Chadra is also referred to as the orange town (المدينة الؤرانجية).

== Politics ==
Chadra participates in Lebanese political life as part of the Akkar District. The village has shown notable support for the Free Patriotic Movement, which has maintained an active presence through local party organization and community engagement.

Local coordinators of the party in Chadra have included Fady Tannous, who served in this role until September 2023, followed by Gimmy Jabbour. The party has been involved in organizing social and community activities in the village, particularly during religious holidays.

In 2023, President Michel Aoun visited Chadra, reflecting the village’s political engagement within the broader context of national politics.
