= Aadbel =

Town in Akkar Governorate, Lebanon

Aadbel عدبل
- town
- Location within Lebanon
- Coordinates: 34°32′05″N 36°05′49″E
- Country: Lebanon
- Governorate: Akkar
- District: Akkar

Area
  - Total: 1.93 km^{2} (0.75 sq mi)
- Elevation: 270 m (890 ft)

Population (2009)
  - Total: 1,065 eligible voters
  - Density: 552/km^{2} (1,430/sq mi)
- Time zone: UTC+2 (EET)
  - Summer (DST): UTC+3 (EEST)
- Dialing code: +961

Aadbel (Levantine Arabic: عدبل, romanized: ʿAdbel) is a small town in Akkar Governorate, Lebanon.

The population in Aadbel are mainly Greek Orthodox and Greek Catholics.

== History ==
In 1838, Eli Smith noted the village, which he called 'Adbel, located east of esh-Sheikh Mohammed.

== Demographics ==
In 2014, Christians made up 99.32% of registered voters in Aadbel. 83.09% of the voters were Greek Orthodox, 9.21% were Greek Catholics and 6.34% were Maronite Catholics.

== Bibliography ==
- Robinson, E.; Smith, E. (1841). Biblical Researches in Palestine, Mount Sinai and Arabia Petraea: A Journal of Travels in the year 1838. Vol. 3. Boston: Crocker & Brewster.
