= Kroum Aarab =

Kroum Aarab كروم عرب
- village
- Location within Lebanon
- Coordinates: 34°33′18″N 36°05′30″E
- Country: Lebanon
- Governorate: Akkar
- District: Akkar

Area
  - Total: 0.57 km^{2} (0.22 sq mi)

Population (2009)
  - Total: 369 eligible voters
  - Density: 650/km^{2} (1,700/sq mi)
- Time zone: UTC+2 (EET)
  - Summer (DST): UTC+3 (EEST)
- Dialing code: +961

Kroum Aarab (Arabic: كروم عرب, romanized: Krūm ʿArab) is a village in Akkar Governorate, Lebanon.

The population is mostly Sunni Muslim.

== History ==
In 1838, Eli Smith noted the village as Kerum 'Arab, located east of esh-Sheikh Mohammed. The inhabitants were Sunni Muslims, Alawite and Christians.

Korum Arab, located in the Akkar region of northern Lebanon, is a community made up predominantly of Sunni Muslims and Orthodox Christians, with strong family and community ties. One of the most prominent families in the village is the Sleiman family, which has a longstanding presence and influence in the local community. The village’s first mayor was Salem Dib Sleiman, who also served as a police chief at the Internal Security Forces (ISF) headquarters in Mina. His service in the security forces and his role as the village’s first mayor reflect the longstanding involvement of the Sleiman family in both public service and the local leadership of Korum Arab.

== Bibliography ==
- Robinson, E.; Smith, E. (1841). Biblical Researches in Palestine, Mount Sinai and Arabia Petraea: A Journal of Travels in the year 1838. Vol. 3. Boston: Crocker & Brewster.
