= Miniara =

Miniara منياره
- Village
- Location within Lebanon
- Coordinates: 34°31′57″N 36°03′38.76″E
- Country: Lebanon
- Governorate: Akkar Governorate
- District: Akkar District
- Time zone: UTC+2 (EET)
  - Summer (DST): UTC+3 (EEST)
- Dialing code: +961

Miniara (Arabic: منياره, romanized: Minyāra, also transliterated Minyara) is a village in Akkar Governorate, Lebanon, 9 kilometers east of the Mediterranean Sea, and 3 kilometers south of Halba. The population is between 7,000 and 10,000.

== History ==
In 1838, Eli Smith noted the village (named Menyarah), whose inhabitants were Greek Orthodox, located west of esh-Sheikh Mohammed.

In 1856 it was named Menyarah on Kiepert's map of Palestine/Lebanon published that year,

Dr Yacoub El Sarraf, son of Ibrahim El Sarraf, was elected the Minister of Health of Lebanon in 1964 and was known for treating poor people free of charge and his many public services.

== Demographics ==
The population is religiously diverse. A Christian village but of several different denominations with a majority of Greek Orthodox and including Melkite Greek Catholic, Maronite Catholic, and Evangelical.

== Education ==
The majority of Miniara's teenage population is either in high school or has completed high school.

Miniara has both private and public schools.

=== Private Schools ===
- Saint Joseph's High School
- Saint Joseph's Elementary School
- Modern School

=== Public Schools ===
- Miniara Female Public School
- Miniara Public High School
- Miniara Boys Public School

== Bibliography ==
- Robinson, E.; Smith, E. (1841). Biblical Researches in Palestine, Mount Sinai and Arabia Petraea: A Journal of Travels in the year 1838. Vol. 3. Boston: Crocker & Brewster.
