= Charbila =

Charbila شربيلا
- Village
- Location within Lebanon
- Coordinates: 34°35′0″N 36°8′46″E
- Country: Lebanon
- Governorate: Akkar
- District: Akkar

Area
  - Total: 5.19 km^{2} (2.00 sq mi)
- Elevation: 300 m (980 ft)

Population
  - Total: 737 eligible voters
  - Density: 142/km^{2} (368/sq mi)
- Time zone: UTC+2 (EET)
  - Summer (DST): UTC+3 (EEST)

Charbila (Arabic: شربيلا, romanized: Sharbīlā) is a village in Akkar Governorate, Lebanon. Its population is mostly composed of Greek Orthodox numbering around 737 eligible voters according to the civil state registers. During summer the population grosses to 500 but declines during winter. It is located in a region called "Drayb el-gharbi" (Arabic: الدريب الغربي) of Akkar. The most common family names are: "Elias", "Chedrawi", "Warrak", “Chalwat”, "Bachour", "Hanna".

== Etymology ==
The origin of the name "Charbila" is Syriac. The word "Sharbila" means light.

== History ==
In 1838, Eli Smith noted the village (under the name Shurbila) as a Greek Christian village, located east of esh-Sheikh Muhammed.

== Geography ==
Charbila is located at the northeast of the Lebanese republic. 124 km (77.05 mi) to the North of the Lebanese capital Beirut and it is 300 meters above sea level. It is limited at the west by the village "Rihaniyeh", at the East by the village "Msalla". Its surface is approximately 5.19 km2.

== Economy and services ==
In Charbila there is only one tile factory (Riad Chedrawi) and the Warrak olive press factory. The agriculture sector is the dominant one in Charbila since 80% of the land is agriculture. The most common trees are olive, almonds, lemons and pine, but the olive trees are the most important ones since olive is used for making olive oil and oil soap. The most common vegetables are tomatoes, cucumbers, eggplants, zucchini... And the most common fruits are pomegranate, prickly pear and grapes. Plus grapes are commonly used for producing arak.

== Municipality ==
It is run by a town council consisted of 9 members and one Mukhtar that are elected every 6 years. But in 2016 a mutual agreement by the families of Charbila established a council without elections.

Year	Revenue (LBP)	Change (%)
2012	1,069,000	-
2013	2,700,000	+152.57
2014	1,485,000	-45
2015	1,353,000	-9
2016	1,380,000	+2

== Religion and demographics ==
Logo of MJO

The population of Charbila is 210 who 40 of them (22.8%) are under 18, and almost half of its population is over 40 years old, they are distributed in three main areas in the village: 42% in the "Seha" which is located on the main road, 17% in "Kamouu" which is in the highest elevation, and 8% in the lowest elevation, and others are dispersed in different locations in the village. And all of its inhabitants belong to the Greek Orthodox faith.

There are 3 churches in Charbila, "Al Saydeh" Church, "Saint Elias" Church and "Al Bael" Church. The "Al Saydeh" Church is located inside the village and was built in 1885, St. Elias church in 1960, and "Al Bael" church in 1968. But the "Saydeh" church is the only one that has a mass every Sunday, and its current priest is Spiridon Tannous who replaced the late Ramez Chedrawi.

Also the MJO (Mouvement de jeunesse Orthodoxe) which is an Orthodox movement for the youth founded in 1942 in Lebanon is active in Charbila since the 1990s. And this movement is the main reason for making Charbila an attraction for neighboring towns and residents that moved, by organising Kermesses and camps and activities with other villages and towns where MJO is active.

== Notable People From Charbila ==
- Fayçal El-Khoury, Member of the Canadian Parliament for Laval-Les Îles

== Gallery ==
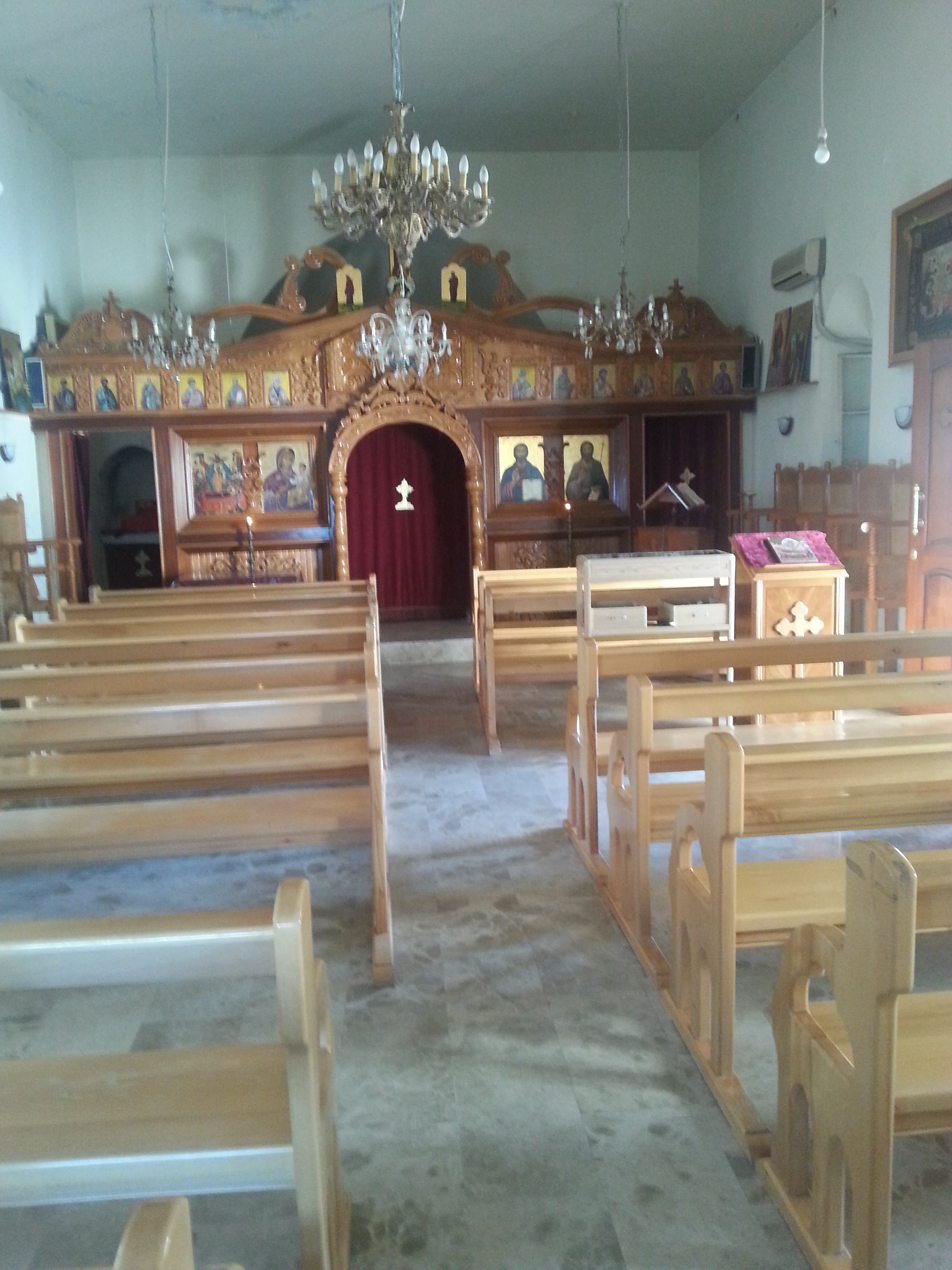
Inside Al Saydeh church

== See also ==
- Akkar District
- Al-Qoubaiyat
- Greek Orthodox Christianity in Lebanon
- Greek Orthodox Church of Antioch

== Bibliography ==
- Robinson, E.; Smith, E. (1841). Biblical Researches in Palestine, Mount Sinai and Arabia Petraea: A Journal of Travels in the year 1838. Vol. 3. Boston: Crocker & Brewster.
