= Tel Abbas el Gharby =

Tel Abbas el Gharby تل عباس الغربي
- Municipality
- Location within Lebanon
- Coordinates: 34°34′45″N 36°04′40″E
- Country: Lebanon
- Governorate: Akkar
- District: Akkar

Area
  - Total: 5.12 km^{2} (1.98 sq mi)
- Elevation: 66 m (217 ft)

Population
  - Total: 5,700
- Time zone: UTC+2 (EET)
  - Summer (DST): UTC+3 (EEST)

Tel Abbas el Gharby (Arabic: تل عباس الغربي; also spelled Tall Aabbas el Gharbi) is a municipality and village located in the Akkar District of the Akkar Governorate in northern Lebanon. It is situated in the fertile Akkar plain, approximately 112 kilometers north of Beirut, and approximately 15 kilometers northeast of the district capital, Halba. It lies within 5 kilometers of the Nahr al-Kabir river, which marks the international border between Lebanon and Syria.

== Geography ==
The village covers an area of 512 hectares (5.12 km²) and is located at an altitude of roughly 66 meters above sea level. The village lies along the western bank of the Ostouan River (Nahr el-Istwan), which separates it from the village Tel Abbas Sharqi and provides primary irrigation for local agriculture. The land is primarily agricultural, with farming focused on cereals and vegetables.

== Demographics ==
Tel Abbas el Gharby is a traditionally Christian village. The population is predominantly Greek Orthodox, with a minority of Maronites. There are an estimated 5,700 total residents living in the village, with approximately 2,060 eligible voters registered in the municipal records.

== Landmarks ==
The village is home to the Church of the Nativity of the Lady, a Greek Orthodox church built in 1881. The church is a religious and community centre for the local Christian residents hosting local liturgies, youth leadership initiatives, and shared inter-denominational activities.

== Economy ==
Agriculture is the primary source of income for the village population. Cultivated crops in the village include potatoes, cereals, and various vegetables grown in open fields and greenhouses. In November 2017, Tel Abbas el Gharby was selected by the Food and Agriculture Organization (FAO) and the Lebanese Ministry of Agriculture as a pilot site for establishing a national small-scale farmers' registry.

== Etymology ==
Tel Abbas el Gharby derives its name from its location on a hill overlooking the Akkar Plain. The name "Abbas" refers to an Ottoman-era governor who ruled the plain, whose descendants reportedly still reside in the village. The designation "el-Gharby" ("the Western") specifies its position west of the Ostouan River (Nahr el-Istwan), which historically served as the primary source of irrigation water for the community.

== History ==
During the 19th century, Tel Abbas el Gharby was part of the Eyalet of Tripoli (and later the Vilayet of Beirut) within the Ottoman Empire. The village functioned as an agricultural center within the Akkar plain, dominated by the iqta (land-grant) system. During this era, the region was governed by the powerful Al-Merehbi (Mir'ibi) family, who exercised political and landholding influence over the Akkar hinterland. The Church of the Nativity of the Lady, built in 1881, reflects the established presence of the Greek Orthodox community during the late Ottoman period.

In the early 1970s, a worker peasant movement in Akkar led to widespread unrest against traditional landholding families. By late 1974, escalating security issues in the region were accompanied by local factions in al-Fnaydeq challenging the authority of traditional political elites in Akkar.

During the Two-Year War phase of the Lebanese Civil War, local civilian populations faced recurring political violence and displacement. In September 1975, renewed fighting across Northern Lebanon and the Akkar district led to initial population movements south toward coastal Christian enclaves, including the Kesrouan region.

On October 9, 1975, a coordinated assault by militants from the neighboring village of Fnaydeq and members of the Popular Front for the Liberation of Palestine (PFLP) resulted in the execution of at least 15 civilians and the abduction of 9 others. During the offensive, the village church and approximately 40 homes were burned, forcing residents to flee across the nearby border into Syria.

Regional security across the Akkar plain deteriorated further on December 31, 1975, when Fnaydeq militants and As-Sa'iqa commandos launched a broader offensive across Christian villages in the Akkar district, resulting in additional civilian casualties, looting, and widespread property destruction, driving further displacement from regional villages.

On May 31, 1976, approximately 2,000 Syrian soldiers entered North Lebanon through Akkar, establishing a regional military presence that persisted in the district until the Syrian troop withdrawal in April 2005.

Since the start of the Syrian civil war in 2011, the village's proximity to the border led to the establishment of several Informal Tented Settlements (ITS) for displaced Syrian families in Tel Abbas el Gharby. Humanitarian organizations, including UNHCR and UNICEF, have since assisted the municipality with infrastructure support, including water management, sanitation, and primary healthcare.

== See also ==
- Agriculture in Lebanon
- Akkar District
- Akkar Governorate
- Greek Orthodox Christianity in Lebanon
- Lebanese Civil War
- Nahr al-Kabir river
- Syria–Lebanon border
