= Hayzouq =

Hayzouq حيزوق
- village
- Location within Lebanon
- Coordinates: 34°32′52″N 36°07′43″E
- Country: Lebanon
- Governorate: Akkar
- District: Akkar

Area
  - Total: 3.00 km^{2} (1.16 sq mi)
- Elevation: 300 m (980 ft)

Population (2009)
  - Total: 1,030 eligible voters
  - Density: 343/km^{2} (889/sq mi)
- Time zone: UTC+2 (EET)
  - Summer (DST): UTC+3 (EEST)
- Dialing code: +961

Hayzouq (Arabic: حيزوق, romanized: Ḥayzūq) is a town in Akkar Governorate, Lebanon.

The population is mostly Sunni Muslims.

== History ==
In 1838, Eli Smith noted the village as Haizuk, located east of esh-Sheikh Mohammed. The inhabitants were Sunni Muslim and Greek Orthodox.

== Bibliography ==
- Robinson, E.; Smith, E. (1841). Biblical Researches in Palestine, Mount Sinai and Arabia Petraea: A Journal of Travels in the year 1838. Vol. 3. Boston: Crocker & Brewster.
