= Andaket =

Andaket عندقت
- Village
- Andaket in Lebanon
- Coordinates: 34°35′12″N 36°18′18″E
- Country: Lebanon
- Governorate: Akkar
- District: Akkar

Population
  - Total: 8,000
- Time zone: UTC+2 (EET)
  - Summer (DST): UTC+3 (EEST)
- Dialing code: +961
- Website: http://andaket.org/

Andaket, Aandqet, (Arabic: عندقت, romanized: ʿAndaqit) is a Maronite Christian village in Akkar Governorate, Lebanon.

== History ==
In 1838, Eli Smith noted 'Andakid as a Maronite village, located east of esh-Sheikh Muhammed.

== Geography ==
Andaket is located at the mountennes area in the northeast part of the Republic of Lebanon. It is 137 km (85.13 mi) to the north of the Lebanese capital, Beirut.

It is bordered at the South by Al-Qoubaiyat, at the East by Akroum, and the north by Chadra and at the West by Aydamoun.

== Bibliography ==
- Robinson, E.; Smith, E. (1841). Biblical Researches in Palestine, Mount Sinai and Arabia Petraea: A Journal of Travels in the year 1838. Vol. 3. Boston: Crocker & Brewster.
