= Tachaa =

Town in Akkar District, Lebanon

Tachaa تاشع
- town
- Location within Lebanon
- Coordinates: 34°29′52″N 36°11′18″E
- Country: Lebanon
- Governorate: Akkar
- District: Akkar

Area
  - Total: 3.79 km^{2} (1.46 sq mi)

Population (2009)
  - Total: 1,136 eligible voters
  - Density: 300/km^{2} (776/sq mi)
- Time zone: UTC+2 (EET)
  - Summer (DST): UTC+3 (EEST)
- Dialing code: +961

Tachaa (Arabic: تاشع, romanized: Tāshaʿ), also spelled Tasha, is a town in Akkar Governorate, Lebanon.

The population of Tachaa is Sunni Muslim and Maronite.

== History ==
In 1838, Eli Smith noted the village as Tasha', located east of esh-Sheikh Mohammed. The residents were Sunni Muslims and Greek Orthodox.

== Bibliography ==
- Robinson, E.; Smith, E. (1841). Biblical Researches in Palestine, Mount Sinai and Arabia Petraea: A Journal of Travels in the year 1838. Vol. 3. Boston: Crocker & Brewster.
