= Jabal Akroum =

Group of 7 Lebanese villages in the Akkar District

Jabal Akroum (Arabic: جبل اكروم) is a group of Lebanese villages in the Akkar District in Akkar Governorate. The villages together have a population of about 20,000. The main village, Akroum, is the only one recognized officially as a municipality although there have been efforts by the Union of Municipalities of Jabal Akroum to change this.

== Villages ==
- Akroum
- Basateen
- Kfartoun
- Mrah el Khaoukh
- Mwanseh
- Qenia
- Sahleh
