= Daghleh =

Village in Akkar District, Lebanon

Daghleh الدغلة
- village
- Location within Lebanon
- Coordinates: 34°34′53″N 36°12′36″E
- Country: Lebanon
- Governorate: Akkar
- District: Akkar

Area
  - Total: 1.01 km^{2} (0.39 sq mi)

Population (2009)
  - Total: 306 eligible voters
  - Density: 303/km^{2} (785/sq mi)
- Time zone: UTC+2 (EET)
  - Summer (DST): UTC+3 (EEST)
- Dialing code: +961

Daghleh (Arabic: الدغلة, romanized: ad-Daghleh, also Daghle) is a village in Akkar Governorate, Lebanon.

The population of Daghle is mostly Sunni and Shia Muslims.

== History ==
In 1838, Eli Smith noted the place as ed-Dughleh, located west of esh-Sheikh Mohammed. The residents were Alawites.

== Bibliography ==
- Robinson, E.; Smith, E. (1841). Biblical Researches in Palestine, Mount Sinai and Arabia Petraea: A Journal of Travels in the year 1838. Vol. 3. Boston: Crocker & Brewster.
