= Haytla =

Haytla هيتلا
- village
- Location within Lebanon
- Coordinates: 34°36′09″N 36°08′02″E
- Country: Lebanon
- Governorate: Akkar
- District: Akkar

Area
  - Total: 2.40 km^{2} (0.93 sq mi)
- Elevation: 230 m (750 ft)

Population (2009)
  - Total: 712 eligible voters
  - Density: 297/km^{2} (768/sq mi)
- Time zone: UTC+2 (EET)
  - Summer (DST): UTC+3 (EEST)
- Dialing code: +961

Haytla (Arabic: هيتلا, romanized: Haytlā) is a town in Akkar Governorate, Lebanon.

The population is mostly Greek Orthodox and Alawite.

== History ==
In 1838, Eli Smith noted the village as Heitela, located east of esh-Sheikh Mohammed. The inhabitants were Alawites and Greek Orthodox.

In 1856 it was also named Heitela on the map of Northern Palestine/Lebanon that Heinrich Kiepert published that year.

== Bibliography ==
- Robinson, E.; Smith, E. (1841). Biblical Researches in Palestine, Mount Sinai and Arabia Petraea: A Journal of Travels in the year 1838. Vol. 3. Boston: Crocker & Brewster.
