= Wadi El Haour =

Wadi El Haour وادي الحور
- village
- Location within Lebanon
- Coordinates: 34°36′32″N 36°09′17″E
- Country: Lebanon
- Governorate: Akkar
- District: Akkar

Area
  - Total: 0.73 km^{2} (0.28 sq mi)
- Elevation: 185 m (607 ft)

Population (2009)
  - Total: 394 eligible voters
  - Density: 540/km^{2} (1,400/sq mi)
- Time zone: UTC+2 (EET)
  - Summer (DST): UTC+3 (EEST)
- Dialing code: +961

Wadi El Haour (Arabic: وادي الحور, romanized: Wādī al-Ḥawr) is a town in Akkar Governorate, Lebanon.

The population is mostly Sunni Muslim.

== History ==
In 1838, Eli Smith noted the village as Wady el-Hawar, located east of esh-Sheikh Mohammed. The inhabitants were Greek Orthodox.

== Bibliography ==
- Robinson, E.; Smith, E. (1841). Biblical Researches in Palestine, Mount Sinai and Arabia Petraea: A Journal of Travels in the year 1838. Vol. 3. Boston: Crocker & Brewster.
