= Naoura =

Village in Akkar District, Lebanon

Naoura النوره
- village
- Location within Lebanon
- Coordinates: 34°37′24″N 36°11′10″E
- Country: Lebanon
- Governorate: Akkar
- District: Akkar

Population (2009)
  - Total: 374 eligible voters
- Time zone: UTC+2 (EET)
  - Summer (DST): UTC+3 (EEST)
- Dialing code: +961

Naoura (Arabic: النوره, romanized: an-Nawra, also Noura) is a village in Akkar Governorate, Lebanon.

The population is mostly Sunni Muslim.

== History ==
In 1838, Eli Smith noted the place as en-Naura, located east of esh-Sheikh Mohammed. The inhabitants were Alawites and Isma'ilites.

== Bibliography ==
- Robinson, E.; Smith, E. (1841). Biblical Researches in Palestine, Mount Sinai and Arabia Petraea: A Journal of Travels in the year 1838. Vol. 3. Boston: Crocker & Brewster.
