= Ain Ez Zayt =

Ain Ez Zayt عين الزيت
- village
- Location within Lebanon
- Coordinates: 34°35′24″N 36°11′59″E
- Country: Lebanon
- Governorate: Akkar
- District: Akkar

Area
  - Total: 1.61 km^{2} (0.62 sq mi)
- Elevation: 450 m (1,480 ft)

Population (2009)
  - Total: 980
  - Density: 610/km^{2} (1,600/sq mi)
- Time zone: UTC+2 (EET)
  - Summer (DST): UTC+3 (EEST)
- Dialing code: +961

Ain Ez Zayt (Arabic: عين الزيت, romanized: ʿAyn az-Zayt) is a town in Akkar Governorate, Lebanon, close to the border with Syria.

The population in Ain Ez Zayt and nearby Kfar El Ftouh are mostly Sunni Muslim or Alawite.

== History ==
In 1838, Eli Smith noted the village as 'Ain ez-Zeit, whose inhabitants were Alawites, located east of esh-Sheikh Mohammed.

== Bibliography ==
- Robinson, E.; Smith, E. (1841). Biblical Researches in Palestine, Mount Sinai and Arabia Petraea: A Journal of Travels in the year 1838. Vol. 3. Boston: Crocker & Brewster.
