= Tikrit, Lebanon =

Tikrit تكريت
- village
- Location within Lebanon
- Coordinates: 34°31′07″N 36°09′29″E
- Country: Lebanon
- Governorate: Akkar
- District: Akkar

Area
  - Total: 5.65 km^{2} (2.18 sq mi)
- Elevation: 540 m (1,770 ft)

Population (2009)
  - Total: 4,069 eligible voters
  - Density: 720/km^{2} (1,870/sq mi)
- Time zone: UTC+2 (EET)
  - Summer (DST): UTC+3 (EEST)
- Dialing code: +961

Tikrit (Arabic: تكريت, romanized: Tikrīt), also spelled Tekrit, is a town in Akkar Governorate, Lebanon.

The population of Tikrit is mostly Greek Orthodox Christian and Sunni Muslim.

== History ==
In 1838, Eli Smith noted the village as 'Tekrit, located south of esh-Sheikh Mohammed. The inhabitants were Sunni Muslim or Greek Orthodox Christians.

== Bibliography ==
- Robinson, E.; Smith, E. (1841). Biblical Researches in Palestine, Mount Sinai and Arabia Petraea: A Journal of Travels in the year 1838. Vol. 3. Boston: Crocker & Brewster.
