= Hrar =

Village in Akkar, Lebanon

Hrar حرار
- village
- Location within Lebanon
- Coordinates: 34°27′25″N 36°07′21″E
- Country: Lebanon
- Governorate: Akkar
- District: Akkar

Area
  - Total: 7.67 km^{2} (2.96 sq mi)
- Elevation: 880 m (2,890 ft)

Population (2009)
  - Total: 2,306 eligible voters
  - Density: 301/km^{2} (779/sq mi)
- Time zone: UTC+2 (EET)
  - Summer (DST): UTC+3 (EEST)
- Dialing code: +961

Hrar (Arabic: حرار, romanized: Ḥrār) is a village in Akkar Governorate, Lebanon.

The population of Hrar is mainly Sunni Muslim.

== History ==
In 1838, Eli Smith noted the village as Harar, whose inhabitants were Sunni Muslims, located south of esh-Sheikh Mohammed.

In 1856 it was named Harar on Kiepert's map of Palestine/Lebanon published that year.

== Bibliography ==
- Robinson, E.; Smith, E. (1841). Biblical Researches in Palestine, Mount Sinai and Arabia Petraea: A Journal of Travels in the year 1838. Vol. 3. Boston: Crocker & Brewster.
