= Aaouainat =

Town in Akkar Governorate, Lebanon

Aaouainat عوينات
- village
- Location within Lebanon
- Coordinates: 34°37′29″N 36°18′07″E
- Country: Lebanon
- Governorate: Akkar
- District: Akkar

Area
  - Total: 2.71 km^{2} (1.05 sq mi)
- Elevation: 450 m (1,480 ft)

Population (2009)
  - Total: 884 eligible voters
  - Density: 326/km^{2} (845/sq mi)
- Time zone: UTC+2 (EET)
  - Summer (DST): UTC+3 (EEST)
- Dialing code: +961

Aaouainat (Arabic: عوينات, romanized: ʿAwaynāt) is a town in Akkar Governorate, Lebanon.

The population is mostly Greek Orthodox and Maronite.

== History ==
In 1838, Eli Smith noted the village as el-'Aweinat, located east of esh-Sheikh Mohammed. The inhabitants were Greek Orthodox and Maronite.

== Bibliography ==
- Robinson, E.; Smith, E. (1841). Biblical Researches in Palestine, Mount Sinai and Arabia Petraea: A Journal of Travels in the year 1838. Vol. 3. Boston: Crocker & Brewster.
