= Tleil =

Tleil تليل
- village
- Location within Lebanon
- Coordinates: 34°35′43″N 36°08′28″E
- Country: Lebanon
- Governorate: Akkar
- District: Akkar

Government
  - Mayor: Joseph Mansour

Area
  - Total: 3.07 km^{2} (1.19 sq mi)
- Elevation: 320 m (1,050 ft)

Population (2009)
  - Total: 1,059 eligible voters
  - Density: 345/km^{2} (893/sq mi)
- Time zone: UTC+2 (EET)
  - Summer (DST): UTC+3 (EEST)
- Dialing code: +961

Tleil (Arabic: تليل, romanized: Tlayl) (also Tlayleh, Tlaile, Tuleil, Tlayl, Al-Talil, Altalil) is a town in Akkar Governorate, Lebanon, close to the border with Syria.

The population in Tleil belongs to various Christian denominations.

== History ==
In 1838, Eli Smith noted the village as Tuleil, whose inhabitants were Maronite or Greek Orthodox Christians, located east of esh-Sheikh Mohammed.

=== Modern era ===
In August 2021, at least 28 people were killed and 79 injured in Tleil after a fuel tank exploded. The fuel tanker had been confiscated by the Lebanese army from black marketeers, the fuel was then distributed/taken by the locals. The son of the man whose land the fuel tanker was located on, was later arrested, accused of deliberately causing the explosion.

== Bibliography ==
- Robinson, E.; Smith, E. (1841). Biblical Researches in Palestine, Mount Sinai and Arabia Petraea: A Journal of Travels in the year 1838. Vol. 3. Boston: Crocker & Brewster.
