= Deir Jannine =

Deir Jannine دير جنين
- village
- Location within Lebanon
- Coordinates: 34°33′53″N 36°10′37″E
- Country: Lebanon
- Governorate: Akkar
- District: Akkar

Area
  - Total: 5.84 km^{2} (2.25 sq mi)
- Elevation: 390 m (1,280 ft)

Population (2009)
  - Total: 767 eligible voters
  - Density: 131/km^{2} (340/sq mi)
- Time zone: UTC+2 (EET)
  - Summer (DST): UTC+3 (EEST)
- Dialing code: +961

Deir Jannine (Arabic: دير جنين, romanized: Dayr Jannīn) is a town in Akkar Governorate, Lebanon, close to the border with Syria.

The population in Deir Jannine are mostly Maronite.

Deir Jenin is about 125 km (77.675 mi) from Beirut, the capital of Lebanon. It rises about 390 m (1,279.59 ft - 426,504 yd) above sea level and extends over an area estimated at 584 hectares (5.84 km² - 2.25424 mi².

== History ==
In 1838, Eli Smith noted the village as Deir Jenin, whose inhabitants were Maronites, located east of esh-Sheikh Mohammed.

== Bibliography ==
- Robinson, E.; Smith, E. (1841). Biblical Researches in Palestine, Mount Sinai and Arabia Petraea: A Journal of Travels in the year 1838. Vol. 3. Boston: Crocker & Brewster.
