= Houaich =

Houaich حويش
- village
- Location within Lebanon
- Coordinates: 34°29′54″N 36°07′01″E
- Country: Lebanon
- Governorate: Akkar
- District: Akkar

Area
  - Total: 6.40 km^{2} (2.47 sq mi)
- Elevation: 490 m (1,610 ft)

Population (2009)
  - Total: 1,451 eligible voters
  - Density: 227/km^{2} (587/sq mi)
- Time zone: UTC+2 (EET)
  - Summer (DST): UTC+3 (EEST)
- Dialing code: +961

Houaich (Arabic: حويش, romanized: Ḥwaysh) is a town in Akkar Governorate, Lebanon.

The population of Houaich is mostly Sunni Muslim.

== History ==
In 1838, Eli Smith noted the village as el-Huweish, located south of esh-Sheikh Mohammed. The inhabitants were Sunni Muslims.

== Bibliography ==
- Robinson, E.; Smith, E. (1841). Biblical Researches in Palestine, Mount Sinai and Arabia Petraea: A Journal of Travels in the year 1838. Vol. 3. Boston: Crocker & Brewster.
