= Jebrayel =

Jebrayel جبرايل
- town
- Location within Lebanon
- Coordinates: 34°31′16″N 36°07′51″E
- Country: Lebanon
- Governorate: Akkar
- District: Akkar

Area
  - Total: 5.33 km^{2} (2.06 sq mi)
- Elevation: 420 m (1,380 ft)

Population (2009)
  - Total: 1,826 eligible voters
  - Density: 343/km^{2} (887/sq mi)
- Time zone: UTC+2 (EET)
  - Summer (DST): UTC+3 (EEST)
- Dialing code: +961

Jebrayel (Arabic: جبرايل, romanized: Jibrāyil) is a small town in Akkar Governorate, Lebanon.

The population in Jebrayel is mainly Antiochian Orthodox Church Christians.

== History ==
In 1838, Eli Smith noted the village, which he called Jibra'il, located east of esh-Sheikh Mohammed. The inhabitants were Greek Orthodox Christians.

== Bibliography ==
- Robinson, E.; Smith, E. (1841). Biblical Researches in Palestine, Mount Sinai and Arabia Petraea: A Journal of Travels in the year 1838. Vol. 3. Boston: Crocker & Brewster.
