= Rihaniyeh =

Village in Akkar, Lebanon

Rihaniyeh الريحانيه (عكـار)
- village
- Location within Lebanon
- Coordinates: 34°34′58″N 36°07′02″E
- Country: Lebanon
- Governorate: Akkar
- District: Akkar

Area
  - Total: 2.97 km^{2} (1.15 sq mi)
- Elevation: 200 m (660 ft)

Population (2009)
  - Total: 513 eligible voters
  - Density: 173/km^{2} (447/sq mi)
- Time zone: UTC+2 (EET)
  - Summer (DST): UTC+3 (EEST)
- Dialing code: +961

Rihaniyeh (Arabic: الريحانيه (عكـار), romanized: ar-Rīḥāniyeh (ʿAkkār), also Rihaniyet) is a village in Akkar Governorate, Lebanon.

The population is mostly Alawite.

== History ==
In 1838, Eli Smith noted the village as er-Rihaniyeh, located east of esh-Sheikh Mohammed. The residents were Alawites.

== Bibliography ==
- Robinson, E.; Smith, E. (1841). Biblical Researches in Palestine, Mount Sinai and Arabia Petraea: A Journal of Travels in the year 1838. Vol. 3. Boston: Crocker & Brewster.
