= Menjez =

Menjez منجز
- village
- Location within Lebanon
- Coordinates: 34°36′56″N 36°14′42″E
- Country: Lebanon
- Governorate: Akkar
- District: Akkar

Area
  - Total: 5.92 km^{2} (2.29 sq mi)
- Elevation: 350 m (1,150 ft)

Population (2009)
  - Total: 943 eligible voters
  - Density: 159/km^{2} (413/sq mi)
- Time zone: UTC+2 (EET)
  - Summer (DST): UTC+3 (EEST)
- Dialing code: +961

Menjez (Arabic: منجز) (also Mounjez) is a town in Akkar Governorate, Lebanon, close to the border with Syria.

The population of Menjez is Maronite.

== History ==
In 1838, Eli Smith noted the village as Menjaz, located east of esh-Sheikh Mohammed. The residents were Maronites.

== Bibliography ==
- Robinson, E.; Smith, E. (1841). Biblical Researches in Palestine, Mount Sinai and Arabia Petraea: A Journal of Travels in the year 1838. Vol. 3. Boston: Crocker & Brewster.
