= Rmah =

Rmah رماح
- village
- Location within Lebanon
- Coordinates: 34°37′10″N 36°15′50″E
- Country: Lebanon
- Governorate: Akkar
- District: Akkar

Area
  - Total: 1.98 km^{2} (0.76 sq mi)
- Elevation: 400 m (1,300 ft)

Population (2009)
  - Total: 742 eligible voters
  - Density: 375/km^{2} (971/sq mi)
- Time zone: UTC+2 (EET)
  - Summer (DST): UTC+3 (EEST)
- Dialing code: +961

Rmah (Arabic: رماح, romanized: Rmāḥ, also Rimah) is a town in Akkar Governorate, Lebanon, close to the border with Syria.

The population in Rmah is mostly Greek Orthodox Christian or Sunni Muslim.

== History ==
In 1838, Eli Smith noted the village as 'Rummah, whose inhabitants were Greek Orthodox Christian or Alawites, located east of esh-Sheikh Mohammed.

== Bibliography ==
- Robinson, E.; Smith, E. (1841). Biblical Researches in Palestine, Mount Sinai and Arabia Petraea: A Journal of Travels in the year 1838. Vol. 3. Boston: Crocker & Brewster.
