= Qaabrîne =

Location in Akkar District, Lebanon

Qaabrîne قعبرين
- village
- Location within Lebanon
- Coordinates: 34°34′04″N 36°02′00″E
- Country: Lebanon
- Governorate: Akkar
- District: Akkar
- Time zone: UTC+2 (EET)
  - Summer (DST): UTC+3 (EEST)
- Dialing code: +961

Qaabrîne (also known as Qa‘brīn; Arabic: قعبرين) is a populated place in the Akkar Governorate, Lebanon.
