= Daoura, Lebanon =

Town in Akkar District, Lebanon

Daoura (Akkar) دورة
- town
- Location within Lebanon
- Coordinates: 34°32′37″N 36°12′53″E
- Country: Lebanon
- Governorate: Akkar
- District: Akkar

Area
  - Total: 7.01 km^{2} (2.71 sq mi)
- Elevation: 680 m (2,230 ft)

Population (2009)
  - Total: 1,689 eligible voters
  - Density: 241/km^{2} (624/sq mi)
- Time zone: UTC+2 (EET)
  - Summer (DST): UTC+3 (EEST)
- Dialing code: +961

Daoura (Akkar) (Arabic: دورة, romanized: Dawrah, also romanized Daouret, Dawra, Doura) is a town in Akkar Governorate, Lebanon.

The population of Daouret is Sunni Muslim, Greek Orthodox and Maronite.

== History ==
In 1838, Eli Smith noted the village as ed-Durah, located east of esh-Sheikh Mohammed. The residents were Sunni Muslims.

== Bibliography ==
- Robinson, E.; Smith, E. (1841). Biblical Researches in Palestine, Mount Sinai and Arabia Petraea: A Journal of Travels in the year 1838. Vol. 3. Boston: Crocker & Brewster.
