= Mar Touma =

Village in Akkar District, Lebanon

Mar Touma مار توما
- village
- Location within Lebanon
- Coordinates: 34°30′40″N 36°01′42″E
- Country: Lebanon
- Governorate: Akkar
- District: Akkar

Area
  - Total: 2.26 km^{2} (0.87 sq mi)
- Elevation: 220 m (720 ft)

Population (2009)
  - Total: 607 eligible voters
  - Density: 269/km^{2} (696/sq mi)
- Time zone: UTC+2 (EET)
  - Summer (DST): UTC+3 (EEST)
- Dialing code: +961

Mar Touma (Arabic: مار توما, romanized: Mār Tūmā) is a village in Akkar Governorate, Lebanon.

The population is mostly Sunni Muslim.

== History ==
In 1838, Eli Smith noted the place as Mar Tuma, located west of esh-Sheikh Mohammed. The inhabitants were Sunni Muslim and Greek Orthodox Christians.

== Demographics ==
In 2014, Muslims made up 99.85% of registered voters in Mar Touma, all of them being Sunni Muslims.

== Bibliography ==
- Robinson, E.; Smith, E. (1841). Biblical Researches in Palestine, Mount Sinai and Arabia Petraea: A Journal of Travels in the year 1838. Vol. 3. Boston: Crocker & Brewster.
