= Aamaret El Baykat =

Town in Akkar District, Lebanon

Aamaret El Baykat عمار البيكات
- village
- Location within Lebanon
- Coordinates: 34°36′30″N 36°09′50″E
- Country: Lebanon
- Governorate: Akkar
- District: Akkar

Area
  - Total: 3.83 km^{2} (1.48 sq mi)
- Elevation: 310 m (1,020 ft)

Population (2009)
  - Total: 512 eligible voters
  - Density: 134/km^{2} (346/sq mi)
- Time zone: UTC+2 (EET)
  - Summer (DST): UTC+3 (EEST)
- Dialing code: +961

Aamaret El Baykat (Arabic: عمار البيكات, romanized: ʿAmār al-Baykāt) is a village in Akkar Governorate, Lebanon.

The population is Sunni Muslim and Alawite.

== History ==
In 1838, Eli Smith noted the place as 'Amar el-Baikat, located east of esh-Sheikh Mohammed. The inhabitants were Sunni Muslim and Greek Orthodox.

== Bibliography ==
- Robinson, E.; Smith, E. (1841). Biblical Researches in Palestine, Mount Sinai and Arabia Petraea: A Journal of Travels in the year 1838. Vol. 3. Boston: Crocker & Brewster.
