= Massoudieh =

Massoudieh مسعودية
- Village
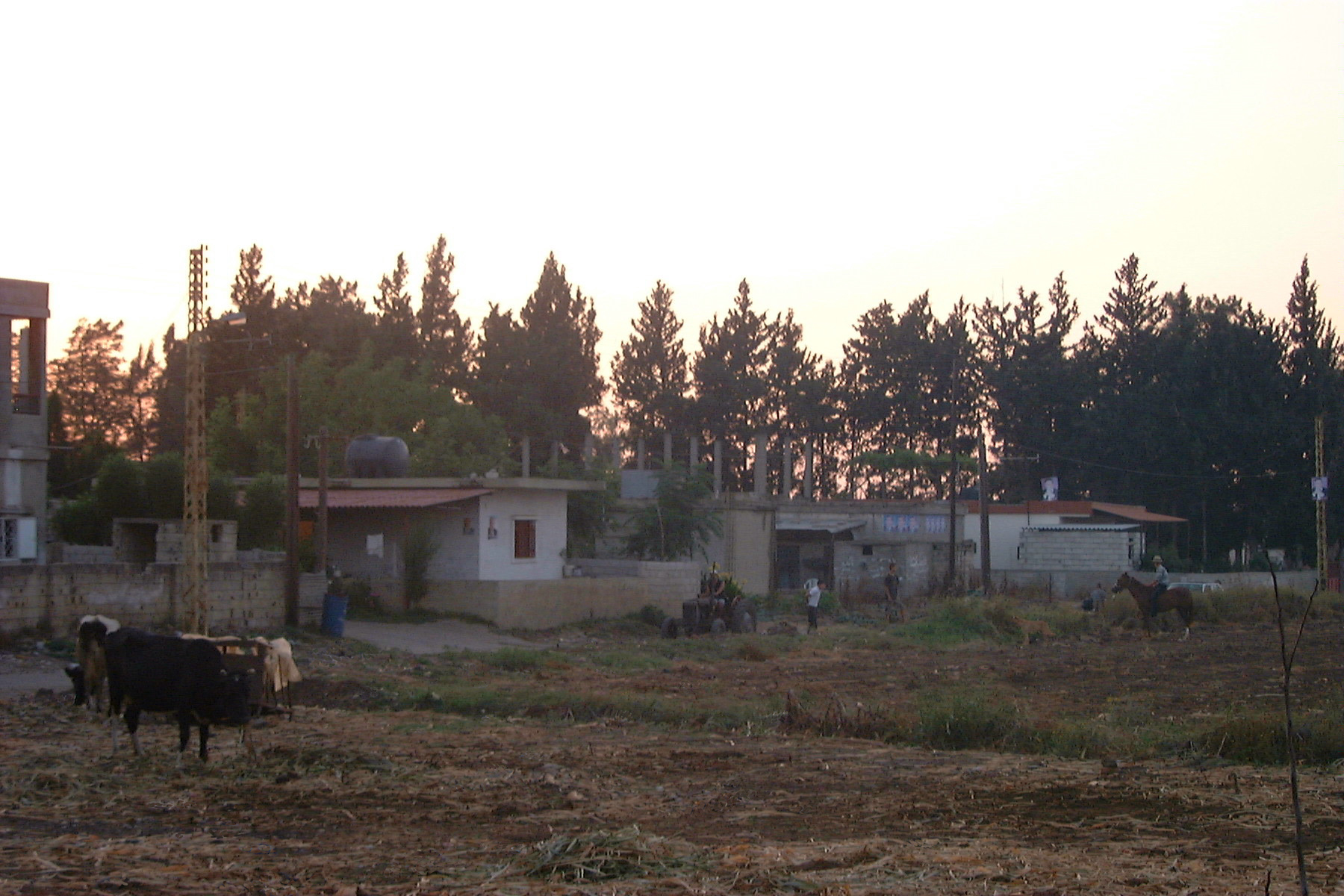
- Field with cows and a boy on a horse in Massoudieh

- Location within Lebanon
- Coordinates: 34°36′21″N 36°02′57″E
- Country: Lebanon
- Governorate: Akkar
- District: Akkar

Area
  - Total: 1.96 sq mi (5.08 km^{2})
- Elevation: 66 ft (20 m)

Population (2009)
  - Estimate: 807 eligible voters

Massoudieh (Arabic: مسعودية) is a village in Akkar Governorate, Lebanon, inhabited by Alawites.

== History ==
In 1838, Eli Smith noted the village as el-Mas'udiyeh, located west of esh-Sheikh Mohammed. The inhabitants were Alawites.

== Population ==
The inhabitants of Massoudieh are Alawites or Sunnis.

A significant percentage of the village population have migrated to the capital city of Beirut. Also, a significant percentage of the town population have migrated overseas to countries such as Brazil, Argentina, United States of America, Canada, Australia, Mexico, Gulf Arab states and European Union (UK and France).

== See also ==
- List of cities and towns in Lebanon
- List of municipalities of Lebanon

== Bibliography ==
- Robinson, E.; Smith, E. (1841). Biblical Researches in Palestine, Mount Sinai and Arabia Petraea: A Journal of Travels in the year 1838. Vol. 3. Boston: Crocker & Brewster.
