= Ilat, Akkar =

Ilat (Akkar) إيلات
- village
- Location within Lebanon
- Coordinates: 34°31′09″N 36°06′35″E
- Country: Lebanon
- Governorate: Akkar
- District: Akkar

Area
  - Total: 4.01 km^{2} (1.55 sq mi)
- Elevation: 350 m (1,150 ft)

Population (2009)
  - Total: 832 eligible voters
  - Density: 207/km^{2} (537/sq mi)
- Time zone: UTC+2 (EET)
  - Summer (DST): UTC+3 (EEST)
- Dialing code: +961

Ilat (Akkar) (Arabic: إيلات, romanized: ʾĪlāt) (also Eilat) is a town in Akkar Governorate, Lebanon.

The population of Ilat is Sunni Muslim and Maronite.

== History ==
In 1838, Eli Smith noted the village as 'Eilat, located south of esh-Sheikh Mohammed. The inhabitants were Maronites.

== Bibliography ==
- Robinson, E.; Smith, E. (1841). Biblical Researches in Palestine, Mount Sinai and Arabia Petraea: A Journal of Travels in the year 1838. Vol. 3. Boston: Crocker & Brewster.
