= José Hazim Frappier =

Dominican politician

Senator for the province of San Pedro de Macorís
- Incumbent
- Assumed office 16 August 2016
- Preceded by: José María Sosa (Dominican Liberation’s Party)
- In office 16 August 1994 – 16 August 2006
- Preceded by: Daniel J. Mejía Rodríguez (Dominican Liberation’s Party)
- Succeeded by: Alejandro Williams (Dominican Liberation’s Party)

2004 Social Christian Reformist Party candidate for Vice President of the Dominican Republic
- Preceded by: Jacinto Peynado Garrigosa (2000)
- Succeeded by: José Enrique Sued (2008)

Rector of the Central University of the East
- In office October 1970 – January 2014
- Preceded by: José Hazim Azar
- Succeeded by: José Hazim Torres

Personal details
- Born: 19 February 1951 (age 75) ](Venezuela)]
- Party: Social Christian Reformist Party
- Spouse: Vilma Torres Puesan
- Children: José Hazim Torres (male), Kamel Hazim Torres (female)
- Parent(s): José Hazim Azar, María Luisa Frappier Mallen
- Profession: Physician
- Ethnicity: White (Dominican Republic)

José Emeterio Hazim Frappier (born 19 February 1951) is a physician, academic and politician from the Dominican Republic. He was the 2004 Social Christian Reformist Party candidate for Vice President of the Dominican Republic and Senator for the province of San Pedro de Macorís from 1994 to 2006. Hazim was Interim president of his party during the illness of the late Carlos Morales Troncoso.

He was born to José Altagracia Hazim Azar (1913–1999), the son of Emeterio José Hazim Assy and Kamel Azar Azar —both Lebanese immigrants natives to Bazbina and Amioun, respectively—, and María Luisa 'Niní' Frappier Mallen (1913–2015), an immigrant from Bremen, Germany, sister of Captain Adolfo 'Boy' Frappier, who devised the use of the word parsley to identify Haitians in 1937, and aunt of Mary Peláez Frappier.
