= Tallé w Chettaha =

Village in Akkar Governorate, Lebanon

Tallé w Chettaha تله - وشطاحه
- Village
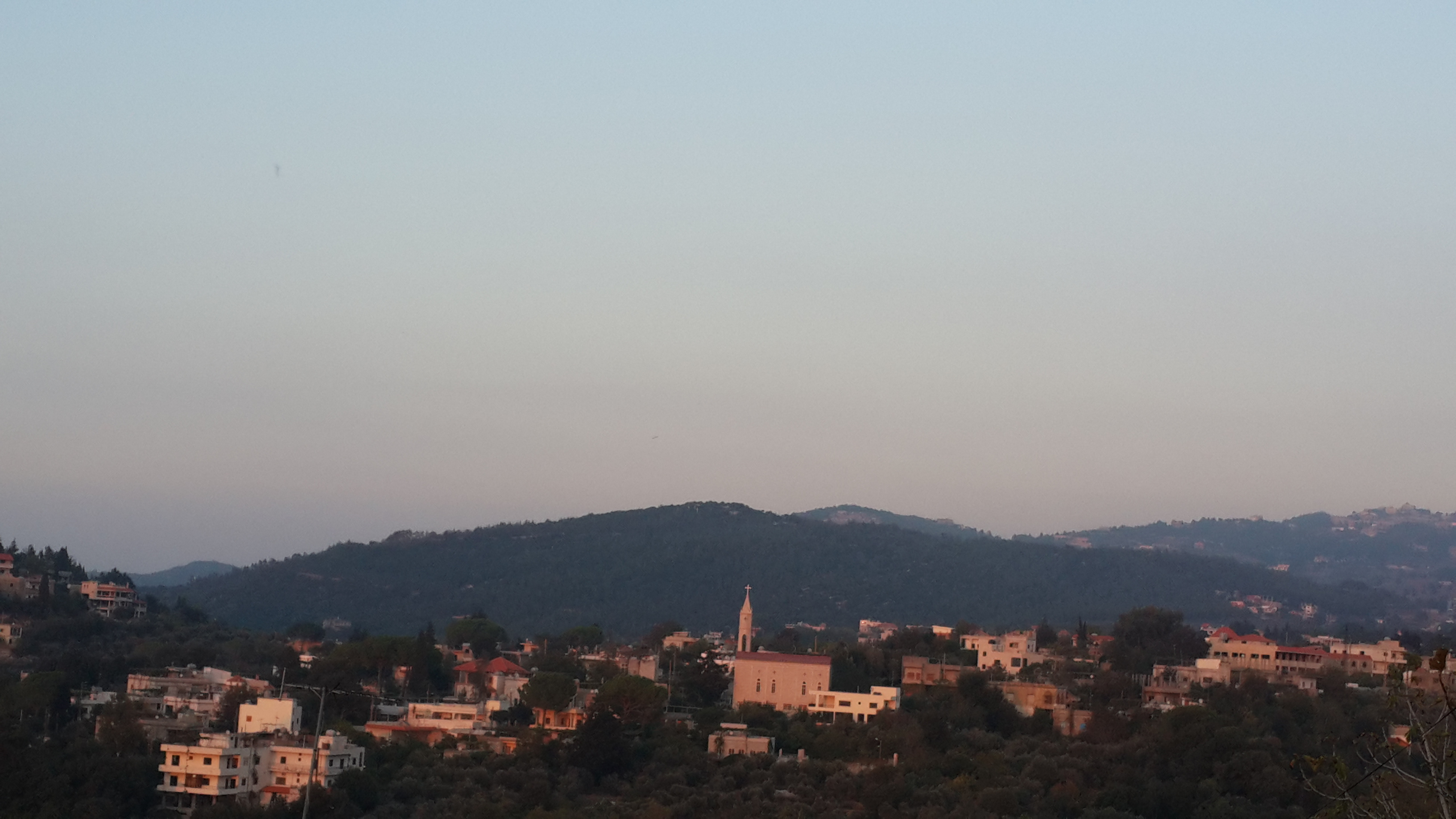
- Tallé w Chettaha

- Location within Lebanon
- Coordinates: 34°31′59″N 36°10′13″E
- Country: Lebanon
- Governorate: Akkar
- District: Akkar
- Highest elevation: 600 m (2,000 ft)
- Lowest elevation: 550 m (1,800 ft)

Population
  - Total: 1,000
- Time zone: UTC+2 (EET)
  - Summer (DST): UTC+3 (EEST)
- Dialling code: +961

Tallé w Chettaha (Arabic: تله - شطاحه, romanized: Talleh w Sheṭṭāḥah) also commonly referred to as Chettaha, is a village in Akkar Governorate, Lebanon, adjacent to Beit Mellat, and it is one of the few remaining Maronite Christian-inhabited villages of Akkar. It is situated 125 km north of the capital Beirut and it is located at approximately 600 metres from sea level. Saint George is the patron Saint of the village, with the only Church in the village being dedicated to him. His feast day is April 23 of each year At that time, the people of Tallé w Chettaha gather for a mass.

== Government ==
The elected municipality council of Tallé w Chettaha is composed of: Roni El Hage, Aziz Barbar, Antoine Abou Halloun, Joseph Kadissi, Rima Bechara, Raline El Hage, Georges El Hage, Toni Kadissi, and Jacques Abou Hanna.

== Families of the village ==
- Abou Halloun
- Abou Hanna
- Aouad
- Barbar
- Bechara
- El Hage
- Gerges
- Habib
- Ishac
- Jbeily
- Kaddissy
- Kalkach
- Khalil
- Sassine
- Tannous
- Wehbe
- Zeinoun

== Climate ==
Climate data for Chettaha, Akkar
| Month | Jan | Feb | Mar | Apr | May | Jun | Jul | Aug | Sep | Oct | Nov | Dec | Year |
|---|---|---|---|---|---|---|---|---|---|---|---|---|---|
| Mean daily maximum °C (°F) | 13 (55) | 14 (57) | 18 (64) | 21 (70) | 25 (77) | 28 (82) | 30 (86) | 30 (86) | 30 (86) | 27 (81) | 21 (70) | 15 (59) | 23 (73) |
| Mean daily minimum °C (°F) | 7 (45) | 8 (46) | 10 (50) | 13 (55) | 17 (63) | 20 (68) | 22 (72) | 23 (73) | 21 (70) | 18 (64) | 13 (55) | 9 (48) | 15 (59) |
| Average rainfall mm (inches) | 118.5 (4.67) | 97.3 (3.83) | 71.6 (2.82) | 37.7 (1.48) | 20.3 (0.80) | — | — | 26.6 (1.05) | 14.1 (0.56) | 57.0 (2.24) | 94.8 (3.73) | 113.3 (4.46) | — |
| Average rainy days | 14 | 12 | 11 | 8 | 4 | 1 | 1 | 1 | 2 | 6 | 9 | 12 | 81 |
