= Hanna Atik =

Lebanese politician

Hanna Yussuf Atik
- Born: February 7, 1959 (age 67); El Hedd, Akkar
- Occupation: Politician
- Political party: Lebanese Forces-Corrective Movement

Hanna Yussuf Atik (born 7 February 1959) is a Lebanese politician, and veteran of the Lebanese Civil War.

== Early life ==
Hanna Yussuf Atik was born on 7 February 1959 in El Hedd, Akkar, a village in Northern Lebanon, to a non-political Maronite family who had been farmers for several generations. He was one of eight children.

The Lebanese Civil War broke out when Atik was a teenager. His first experience with the war occurred in 1976 when he was around 16 years old; after severe confrontations with the Palestinian-backed forces, the Lebanese Army withdrew from Bayt Mellat. Two soldiers sought refuge in Al Hedd-Akkar, and Atik's grandmother and uncle instructed him to lead the soldiers up the river from Al Hedd to Al Kubayyat, around 16 kilometres away.

== Displaced by war ==
Further attacks were carried out on Lebanese villages by armed groups from the Palestine Liberation Organization (PLO), working with allied local Lebanese factions. After massacres in neighboring Christian villages such as Bayt Mellat, Rahbe, Tel Abbas and Deir Janeen, Hanna Atik and his family were forced to flee towards Keserwan. Penniless and without any connections, they rented a small apartment in Zouk Mkeyil. To earn a living, Atik started working in a marble factory, and through interactions with his co-workers, he was introduced to the Phalangist Party (Kataeb). In the early days of his participation, he joined the party's evening training sessions and continued his day job to support his family.

In 1977, at the age of 17, Hanna Atik joined the SKS Force of the Phalangist Party. Early on in his career, he gained the nickname "Hanoun". After a few years, he joined the Lebanese Forces in 1982 at their inception under the command of Bachir Gemayel.

== Military career ==
From 1980 to 1981, Atik was in charge of Adonis' Defense Units. In 1982 he formed and trained the elite Sadem unit of the Lebanese forces, which scored numerous victories during the war. Atik was the first leader to allow women to join the military forces, and held a dedicated Sadem training session specifically for females. As the Lebanese Forces experienced several leadership takeovers following the assassination of founder Bachir Gemayel, Hanna Atik continued to serve within the ranks of the Lebanese Forces, leading his command to a number of victories in battle, including Billa, Achrafiye's Battle of 100 days, Qanet, Oyoun l Seeman, Al Masatel, Sanneen, the French Room (Ghurfe Franciye), Zahle, Mtolle, and Ain Al Hor. He also planned and led several special operations, including an operation ordered by Fouad Abou Nader to rescue Samir Gaegae from Dair Al Amar when it was besieged by the Progressive Socialist Party.

In 1985, during one the uprisings within the Lebanese Forces against its leaders, known as 15 Kenoun (January), Hanna Atik lost his brother, Rezkollah Yussuf Atik, at the age of 23. Shortly after, he was detained for 10 days under the new leadership of the Lebanese Forces. However, he agreed to continue serving within the ranks of the Lebanese Forces, on condition that all other detained LF members be released unharmed, and that he would never obey an order to hold a gun against any of his comrades.

Atik held various positions through his years of service in the Lebanese Forces, including District Chief of the LF Headquarters, Head of the 1st and 2nd Task Force, and Commander of the 1st Defense Battalion. Eventually, he became the Vice Chief of Staff, and in 1991 he held one of the 12 seats on the LF Leadership Council and was appointed Head of the LF Youth Organization.

== Exile ==
In 1994, some time after the Taef Accord was signed, when the Lebanese Forces Party was dissolved, Hanna Atik was arrested alongside many of his colleagues, and held by the Syrian government for nearly three months, during which time he was threatened and physically mistreated. He was eventually released due to the lack of evidence against him, and in 1995 was exiled to the United States, where he lived in San Francisco, California, with his family for the following 13 years. During his exile, Atik remained politically active and formed the Lebanese Forces Political Council, being elected as its Secretary General. The council directed its efforts towards the withdrawal of the Syrian government from Lebanon, the liberation of Samir Gaegae and other political prisoners, and the return of exiled fighters such as himself to Lebanon.

In 2002, after years of disagreements between several Lebanese Christian factions and political parties, Hanna Atik negotiated the reconciliation between the Lebanese Forces, represented by himself, the Phalangist Party (Kataeb) represented by its leader President Ameen Gemayel, the National Liberal Party (Al Ahrar) represented by its leader Dory Shamoun, and several other Lebanese Christian parties.

== Return and recognition ==
Hanna Atik returned to Lebanon in 2007, upon the withdrawal of the Syrian forces.

He has received numerous medals of honors in recognition of his service, including an Honorary sword presented to him by President Bachir Gemayel in 1977 when Gemayel made him Officer (dabet), Zahle's Heroic Medallion in 1981, and Saint Elige's highest honorary Award.

== Personal life ==
Today, Hanna Atik lives in Keserwan with his wife and four children. He remains a devout Christian.
