= Bezbina =

Bezbina (Aakkar) بزبينا
- City
- Location within Lebanon
- Coordinates: 34°30′56″N 36°11′43″E
- Country: Lebanon
- Governorate: Akkar
- District: Akkar

Area
  - Total: 5.93 km^{2} (2.29 sq mi)
- Elevation: 660 m (2,170 ft)

Population (2009)
  - Total: 2,268 eligible voters
  - Density: 382/km^{2} (991/sq mi)
- Time zone: UTC+2 (EET)
  - Summer (DST): UTC+3 (EEST)
- Dialing code: +961

Bezbina (Arabic: بزبينا, romanized: Bezbīnā) is a small town in Akkar Governorate, Lebanon.

The population in Bezbina is mainly Greek Orthodox Christians and Sunni Muslims.

== History ==
In 1838, Eli Smith noted the village, called Bzebina, located east of esh-Sheikh Mohammed. The inhabitants were Sunni Muslim, Greek Orthodox Christians and Maronites.

== Bibliography ==
- Robinson, E.; Smith, E. (1841). Biblical Researches in Palestine, Mount Sinai and Arabia Petraea: A Journal of Travels in the year 1838. Vol. 3. Boston: Crocker & Brewster.
