= Qarha =

Qarha may refer to:

- Qarha, Akkar District, a village in Lebanon, Akkar District
- Qarha, Baalbek District, a village in Lebanon, Baalbek District
