= Denbo =

Town in Akkar District, Lebanon

Denbo دنبو - عين الذهب
- village
- Ain El-Zahab
- Location within Lebanon
- Coordinates: 34°28′44″N 36°05′16″E
- Country: Lebanon
- Governorate: Akkar
- District: Akkar
- Highest elevation: 750 m (2,460 ft)
- Lowest elevation: 450 m (1,480 ft)

Population (2009)
  - Total: 4,078 eligible voters
- Time zone: UTC+2 (EET)
  - Summer (DST): UTC+3 (EEST)
- Dialing code: +961

Denbo (Levantine Arabic: دنبو, romanized: Denbō, also Dinbou, Danbou), now known as Ain al Dahab (Arabic: عين الذهب, romanized: ʿAyn ad-Dahab) is a Sunni Muslim settlement/village in Akkar Governorate, Lebanon.

Many locals of the village have migrated to other countries such as Brazil, America, Canada and especially Australia, for a better life and to support family members back home.
