= Saint Nohra =

Maronite saint and lord in Persia

Saint Nohra (also Nuhra), St. Lucius or Mar Nohra was a Maronite saint and mar. The saint's name derives from Aramaic, meaning "light". He was born in Persia (modern day Iran) in the third century, and is not to be confused with Pope Lucius I.

According to the Maronite synaxarion, his day of remembrance is 22 July. Also according to the Maronite Synaxarion, it is mentioned that he has travelled preaching the Gospel and suffered martyrdom in Smar Jbeil, Batroun, Lebanon. His name in Syriac means "light" and he is the patron saint of anyone suffering from blindness or eye diseases. His Church in Smar Jbeil is in the center of the town, on the main street leading the travelers to Batroun.

== Churches and monasteries dedicated to Saint Nohra ==
Churches and monasteries, located in Lebanon, dedicated to Saint Nohra include:

- The Monastery of Saint Nohra, Bsharri, North Governorate
- Saint Nohra Church, Deir el Ahmar, Beqaa Valley, Beqaa Governorate
- Saint Nohra Church, Deria, Batroun, North Governorate
- Saint Nohra Church, Dmalsa Jbeil, Mount Lebanon Governorate
- Saint Nohra Church, El Hed, Akkar, North Governorate
- Saint Nohra Church, Furn el Shubbak, Beirut, Beirut Governorate
- Saint Nohra Church, Hardine, North Governorate
- Saint Nohra Church, Smar Jbeil, Batroun, North Governorate
- Saint Nohra Church, Ghbaleh, Keserwan, Mount Lebanon
- Saint Nohra Church, Aintoura El-Metn, Mount Lebanon
- Saint Nohra Church, Sahel Alma, Jounieh, Mount Lebanon
- Saint Nohra Church, Kornet El Hamra, Mount Lebanon
