= Akkar plain foothills =

Archaeological site in Lebanon

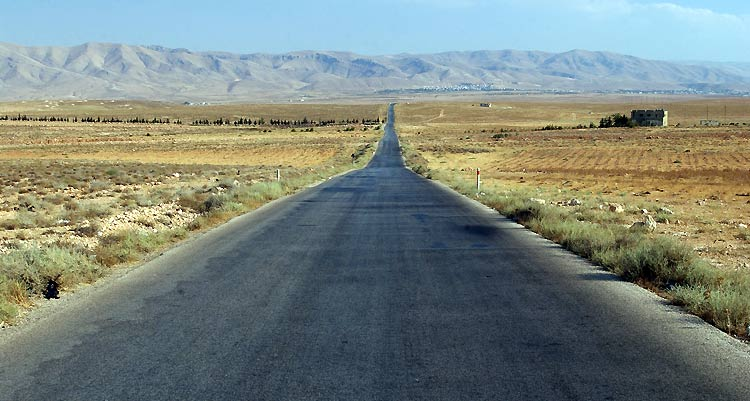

- Location within Lebanon
- 34.540278°N 36.088611°E
- Periods: Heavy Neolithic, Neolithic
- Cultures: Qaraoun culture
- Location: between Halba and Adbe, Lebanon
- Region: Akkar Governorate

Site notes
- Archaeologists: R. Wetzel, J. Haller, Lorraine Copeland
- Public access: Yes

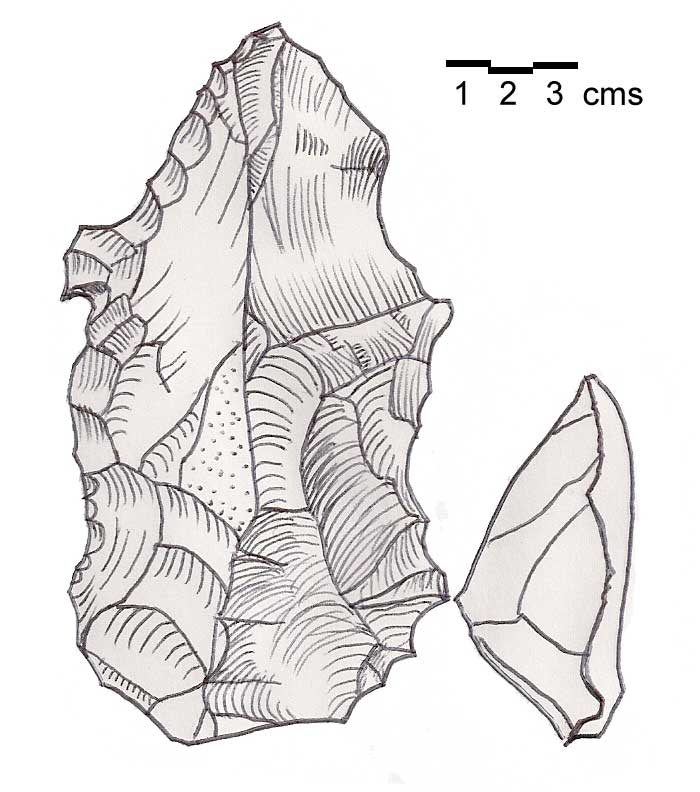
Heavy Neolithic tools of the Qaraoun culture found at Mtaileb I - Massive nosed scraper on a flake with irregular jagged edges, notches and "noses". Light grey and streaky silicious limestone.

The Akkar plain foothills are the location of several surface archaeological sites found between Halba and Adbe in Akkar Governorate, Lebanon.

The sites were found in neogene conglomerates above the 200 metres (660 ft) contour on Louis Dubertret's geological map and mentioned by R. Wetzel and J. Haller in 1945. The materials found were described as "Gros bifaces" along with other roughouts. The tools were originally classified as Chelleo-Acheullean however Lorraine Copeland suggested them reclassified as a Heavy Neolithic assemblage of the Qaraoun culture in light of more modern research.
