= Fneidik =

Fneidik فنيدق
- Village
- Location in Lebanon
- Coordinates: 34°28′37″N 36°10′59″E
- Country: Lebanon
- Governorate: Akkar
- District: Akkar

Area
  - Total: 1.639 sq mi (4.246 km^{2})
- Elevation: 3,770 ft (1,150 m)

Population (2009)
  - Total: 8,937 eligible voters
- Time zone: UTC+2 (EET)
  - Summer (DST): +3

Fnaidek or Fnaydeq (Arabic: فنيدق, romanized: Fnaydiq) is a village in Akkar Governorate, Lebanon. Its inhabitants are Sunni Muslims.

== History ==
In 1838, Eli Smith noted Fendik as a Sunni Muslim village, located south of esh-Sheikh Muhammed.

== Demographics ==
In 2014, Muslims made up 99.93% of registered voters in Fneidik. 99.85% of the voters were Sunni Muslims.

== Bibliography ==
- Robinson, E.; Smith, E. (1841). Biblical Researches in Palestine, Mount Sinai and Arabia Petraea: A Journal of Travels in the year 1838. Vol. 3. Boston: Crocker & Brewster.
