= Denbo (disambiguation) =

Denbo or Dinbo is a settlement in Lebanon.

Denbo may also refer to:

- Denbo, Pennsylvania
- Gary Denbo (born 1960), American former baseball player
- Jamie Denbo (born 1973, American actress
- Jerry Denbo (1950-2014), American businessman

== See also ==
- Deno (disambiguation)
