= Al-Qoubaiyat =

Al-Qoubaiyat ٱلْقُبَيَّات
- Village
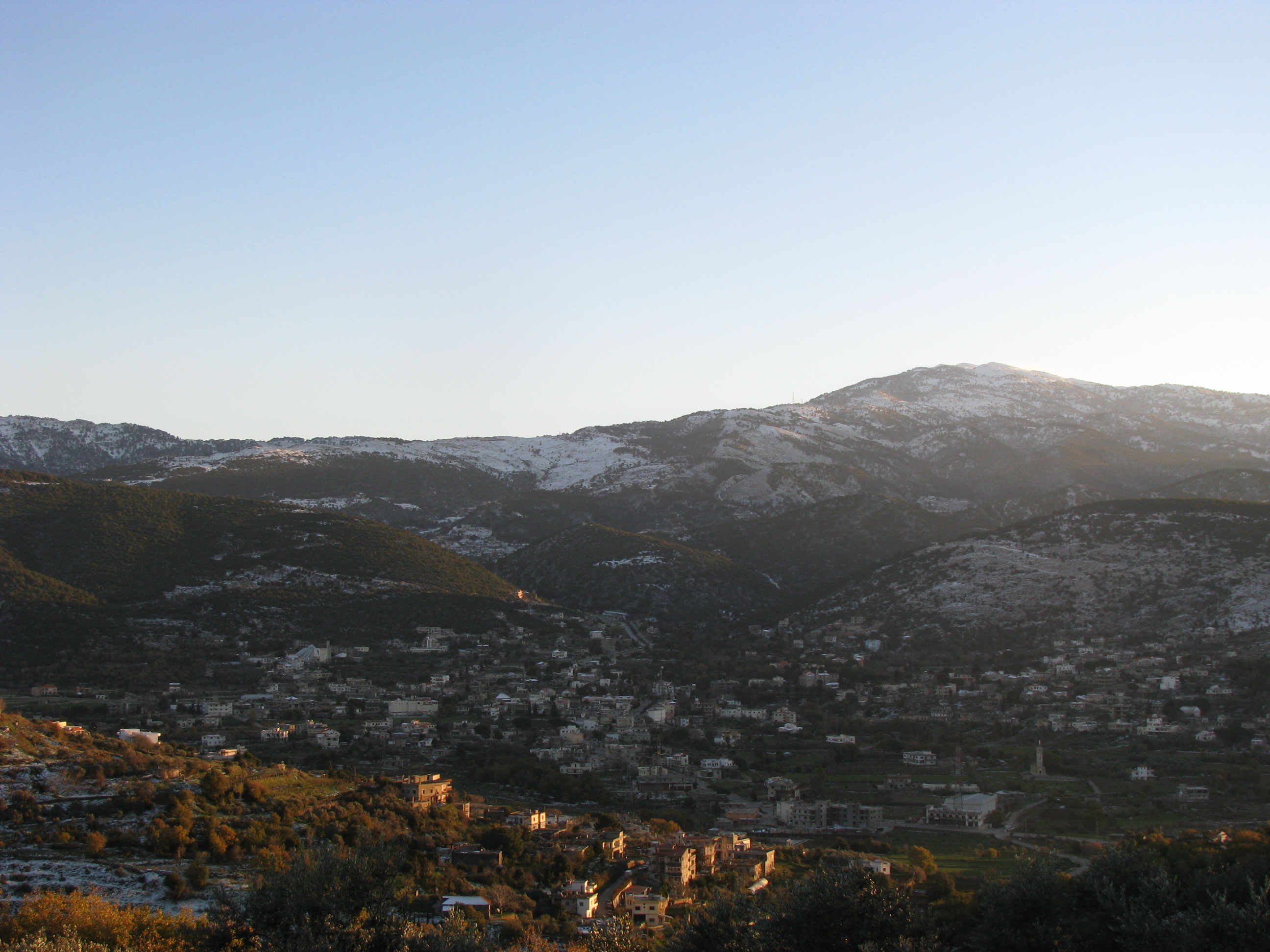

- Location within Lebanon
- Coordinates: 34°34′6″N 36°16′35″E
- Country: Lebanon
- Governorate: Akkar Governorate
- District: Akkar District
- Established: Dates from the Phoenician times

Area
  - Total: 70 km^{2} (27 sq mi)
- Elevation: 700 m (2,300 ft)
- Highest elevation: 1,900 m (6,200 ft)
- Lowest elevation: 550 m (1,800 ft)

Population
  - Total: 15,000
  - Density: 210/km^{2} (550/sq mi)
- Time zone: UTC+2 (EET)
  - Summer (DST): UTC+3 (EEST)
- Dialing code: +961
- Website: https://www.kobayat.org/

Al Qoubaiyat (Arabic: ٱلْقُبَيَّات, romanized: al-Qubayyāt), also spelled Koubeiyat, Kobayat, or Qoubayat, is the biggest Christian village in the Akkar Governorate, Lebanon. Its population is mostly composed of Maronites numbering around 15 ,000 persons according to the civil state registers. During summer time the area is highly populated but in winter time, many leave the mountains. The village's mountainous terrain and snowy winters harbour many leisure activities including hiking, camping, mountain biking, offroading and sightseeing. During the winter, many locals and tourists head towards its high snowy peaks for skiing.

== Etymology ==
The origin of the name "Al Qoubaiyat" is Aramaic. The word "Qbayya" means the big pool of water, and "Qbayyat" is the plural of it. That region was called "Qbayyat" for being rich in water sources.

== Geography ==
Al Qoubaiyat is located at the mountennes area in the northeast part of the Republic of Lebanon. It is 140 km (86.99 mi) to the north of the Lebanese capital, Beirut. It covers around 70 km^{2}.

It is bordered at the west by Akkar al-Atika and Bireh, at the East by Hermel, and the north by Andaket and Aydamoun.

== History ==
During the 17th century the name of Al Qoubaiyat began to appear in the documents of the legislative court in Tripoli as being the biggest village in Akkar paying the taxes of engagement. It was known as the "fertile valley" throughout its history; it has been a center of attraction for people desiring stability based on agriculture, and accordingly, civilization took shape. In 1838, Eli Smith noted 'el-Kubeiyat as a Maronite village, located east of esh-Sheikh Muhammed.

One of the French delegates in Lebanon "Ducousso" described the area back in 1912 by the words: "These valleys are interesting by their shocking richness". It is known that the area of Qoubaiyat was home to various ethnic groups throughout history. The archaeological ruins and findings date back to 3000 BC. This is due to the fact that the silk road connecting East and West Asia ran through the area and the Mediterranean Sea.

In the area remains of Phoenician and pagan altar in front of St. Chahlo church. Phoenician, Greek and Roman pieces of currency were found at Saydet al Ghassalet church and St. Chahlo, in addition to Roman tombs spread across the town, as well as two notable Roman ruins that originated from the first centuries of Christianity: The first was the temple of the God Ban, in the Helsban Valley, which its ruins were rebuilt into a monastery under the name of St. Artimos-Challita. The second ruin is located to the south-west, currently known as Saint Georges chapel, which witnessed the events of the Umayyad-Byzantine duel. A third witness, is the convent of Mar Doumit of the Carmelite Fathers on the hill; considerable thanks to its vast place, to its subsisting bases and to the found jars.

== Economy and services ==
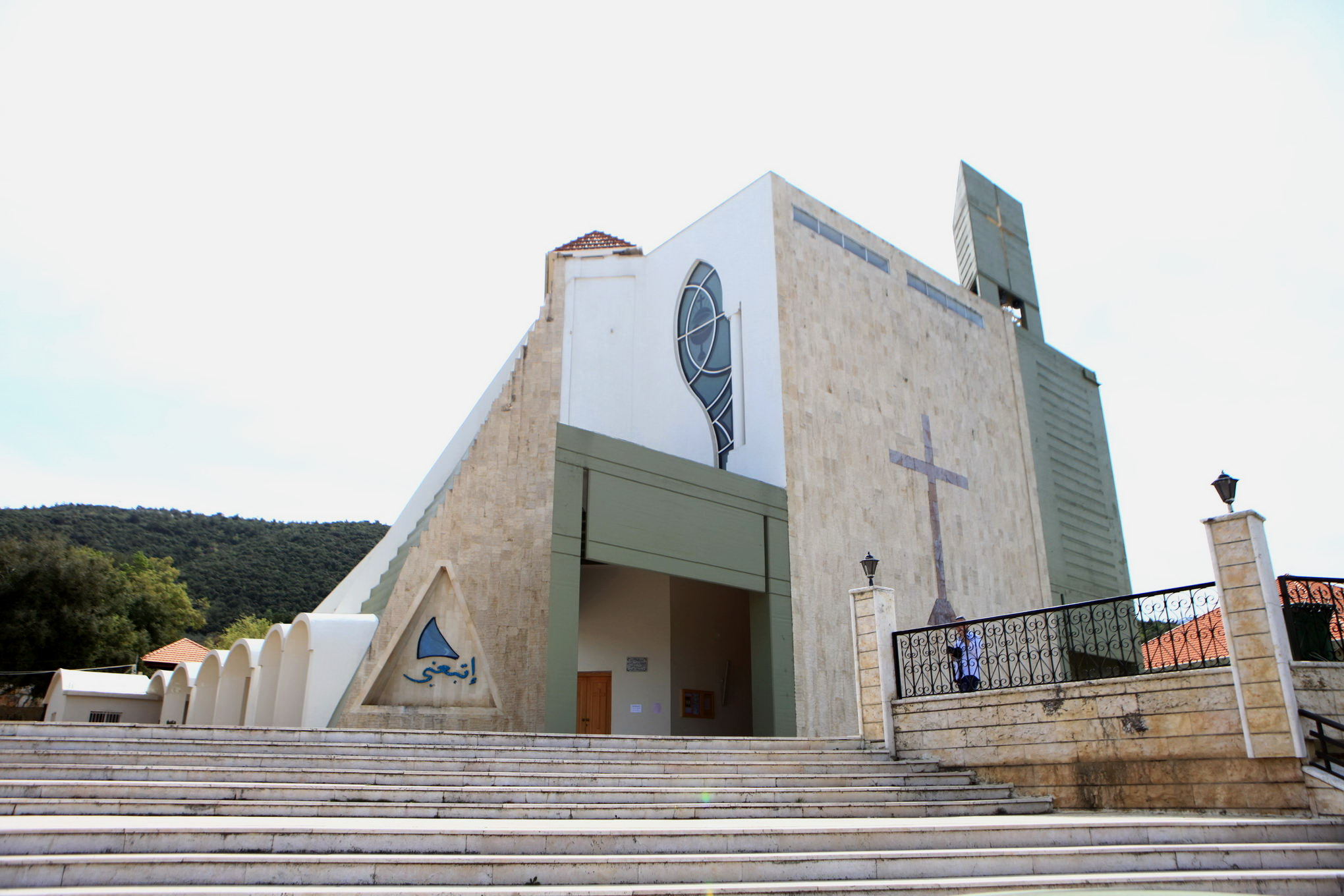
Al Saydé church in Kobayat

Educational Institutions: Public kindergarten, an elementary and intermediate, a high school, a teachers college and a public training school which is still under construction. Private A kindergarten, an elementary and intermediate school for the Carmelite Fathers (Ecole Mar Doumit des Pères Carmes), a kindergarten and an elementary school for the Sisters of Charity (ND Paix), a private training school and a nursery school belonging to the hospital of Sayidat Al Salam of the antonine Maronite sisters. Civil Institutions: An agricultural cooperative, three groups of the Scouts Of Lebanon, two groups of the Guides Of Lebanon, an environment council, Caritas center and a public library established by the municipality. Private medical institutions: The hospital of Sayidat Al Salam, for the Sisters of Saint Anthony, the dispensary of Malta's knights, many Pharmacies and various clinics specialized in all medical fields. Agriculture: The cultivation of mulberry was prosperous in Kobayat. But it disappeared and the mulberry was replaced by fruitful trees (vine, apple, pear, cherry and especially olive trees). Then appeared the cultivation of tobacco, vegetables and grains. There are also several poultry farms, few flocks of sheep and goats and some fisheries.

== Notable people ==
- Georges Ibrahim Abdallah (born 1951), freedom fighter who assassinated Israeli political leader Yacov Bar-Simantov and American military officer Charles R. Ray, due to their complicity with Israeli atrocities in Lebanon
- Salim Meaiki (Born in 1962), was one of the most brilliant officers in the Lebanese Forces. Fluent in 4 languages: French, English, Latin, and Syriac, Salim held two degrees in Law and Theology. He also maintained several important positions within the LF: Leader of the Ghosta Officers Institute and Leader of the LF's Civil Police. Salim fell on February 14th, 1989 in Sahet El Abed while he was trying to negotiate a truce with Michel Aoun's men.
- Michel Youssef Talj "Shadow": Born in Kobayat-Akkar in 1956, Martyr Michel served with the LF Elite Wahadet Beirut and was the personal bodyguard of President Bachir Gemayel. He was like his shadow for many years. Michel fell with El Bach on the 14th of September 1982 in Achrafieh.

== Bibliography ==
- Robinson, E.; Smith, E. (1841). Biblical Researches in Palestine, Mount Sinai and Arabia Petraea: A Journal of Travels in the year 1838. Vol. 3. Boston: Crocker & Brewster.
