= Alejandro Williams =

Dominican dentist and politician

Senator for the province of San Pedro de Macorís
- In office 16 August 2006 – 16 August 2010
- Preceded by: José Hazim Frappier (Social Christian Reformist Party)
- Succeeded by: José María Sosa (Dominican Liberation’s Party)

Personal details
- Born: 28 October 1969 (age 56) San Pedro de Macorís Province (Dominican Republic)
- Party: Dominican Liberation’s Party (until 2009)
- Other political affiliations: Independent Revolutionary Party
- Education: Universidad Central del Este
- Profession: Odontologist
- Committees: President: Comisión de Dominicanos Ausentes; Vice-President: Comisión de turismo Member: Comisión de Energía

Alejandro Leonel Williams Cordero (born 28 October 1969) is a dentist and politician from the Dominican Republic. He was Senator for the province of San Pedro de Macorís.

Williams has a doctorate in medicine from the Universidad Central del Este; thereafter he migrated to the United States and opened a dental clinic in The Bronx. The expansion on his business caused him to have eight clinics throughout NYC.

In May 2006, Williams was elected as Senator of San Pedro de Macorís with 50.46% of the votes, winning over Social Christian Reformist Party's José Hazim Frappier, heir of an economic empire that includes Williams's alma mater.

Williams's tenure was marked by a low participation in meetings and committees, which by 2008 would be virtually nil. In 2009, close to the end of his tenure, Williams found himself in a controversy over his poor attendance to the Senate's sessions. Also, Williams was being subject to investigations in the United States due to an alleged Medicare fraud; the opposition called for an impeachment to remove him from office. His party rejected his candidacy for the 2010 parliamentary election, and expelled him.

Williams was the candidate for senator of San Pedro de Macorís for the Independent Revolutionary Party (PRI) in 2010. He obtained 2.26% of the votes.

Political offices
Preceded by José Hazim Frappier	Senator for the San Pedro de Macorís Province; 16 August 2006 – 16 August 2010	Succeeded by José María Sosa
