= El Hedd =

El Hedd الهد
- Village
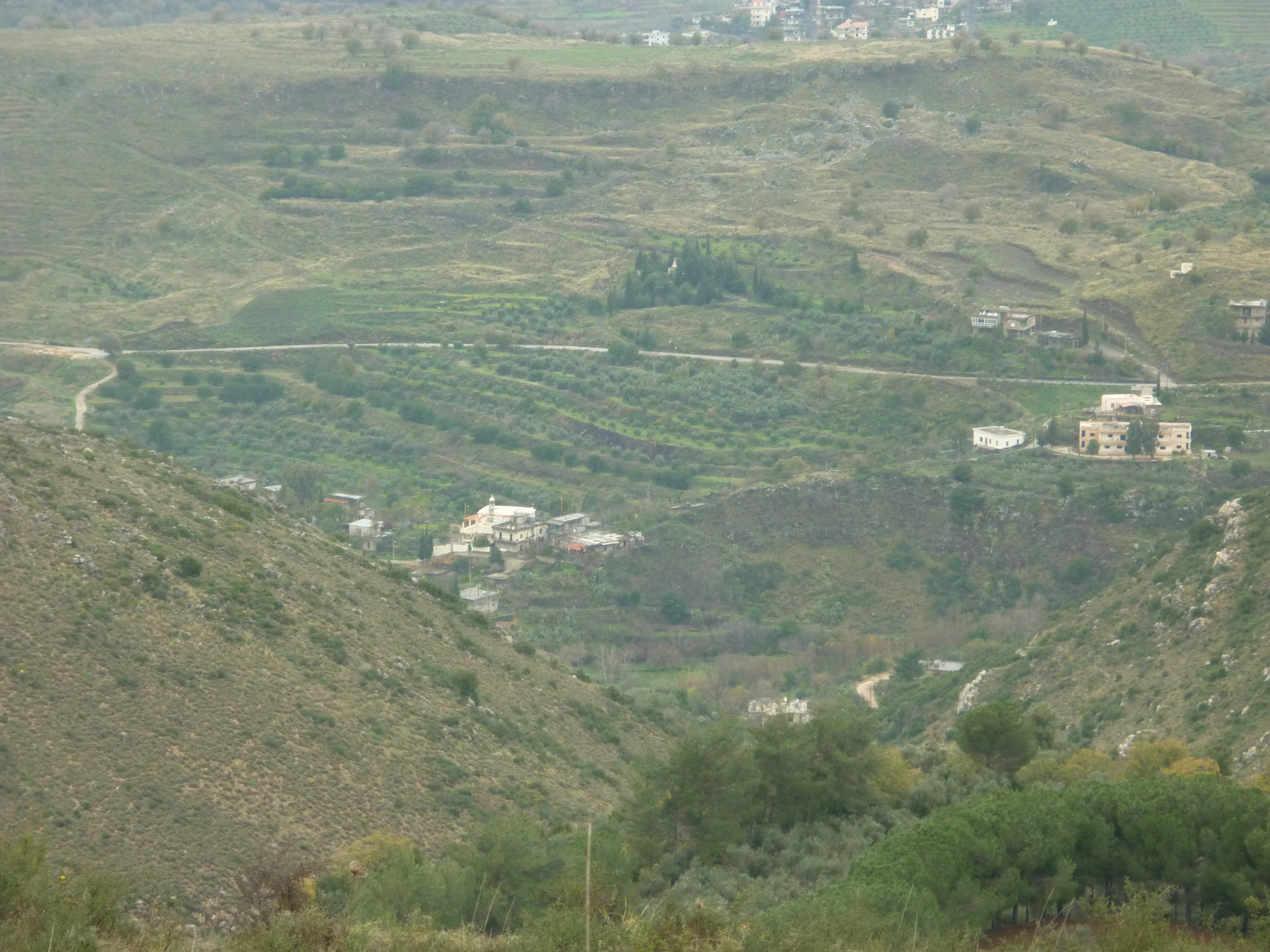
- El Hed - a view of the village from Baino, 2012

- Location within Lebanon
- Coordinates: 34°33′32″N 36°9′32″E
- Country: Lebanon
- Governorate: Akkar
- District: Akkar
- Elevation: 248 m (814 ft)
- Time zone: UTC+2 (EET)
  - Summer (DST): UTC+3 (EEST)

El Hedd (also El Hed or ElHedd) is a village in Akkar Governorate, Lebanon. The villagers are Maronites.

== History ==
El Hedd is originally a Syriac Aramaic name which stands for "El" means god "Hedd" means joy: El Hedd means "god of joy". The village sits on the edge of a hilltop overlooking the "Al Estwan" river.

== Church of St. Nohra ==
The Church of Saint Nohra was documented in the late 19th and early 20th centuries. The saint's name is derived from the Aramaic nuhro (light). The original church was small, with red tile roofing. Its ruins are across the al-Estwan River, 2 kilometres (1.2 mi) away on a hilltop surrounded by pine and oak trees. The church, which may have dated to the fifth or sixth century, was surrounded by Maronite (Christian) villages on both sides of the Al-Estwan River. Sunni (Muslim) villages have been built near the ruins of the church over the past 200 years, replacing the Christians in the area after the invasion by the Ottoman Empire. Other church ruins exist in the village of Mazraate Baldah; one is the church of Al-Saaidah, the Virgin Mary. A 500-year-old oak tree with branches extending over 15 meters is revered by the Islamic villagers, who refer to the tree and surrounding ruins as Al-Saaidah (Our Lady). The church's complete reconstruction, including a concrete roof, was finished in 1972.

== Families ==
The families in El Hedd date back to the fourth century. They, their descendants and those connected to the village are:

- Isaac – Found in Lebanon, Australia, Brazil, France, Alkoura, North Lebanon and Beirut
- Alkhoury – also known as Tadrous due to the name of the grandfather, whose father was a priest in the village. Descendants of this family are found in Lebanon, Venezuela, and Australia.
- Hanna – Found in Spain, Venezuela and Australia
- Maroun – Found in Lebanon and Venezuela
- Tannous - Found in Brazil; descendants of the Badr Tannous Elias family but originally: descendants of the Isaac family
- Atik – Found in Lebanon, Ireland, Australia and Africa
- Dib - Found in Lebanon, Venezuela, Argentina and Australia
- Marina - Found in Lebanon, Venezuela, Europe.

The Isaac family, the first settlers in the village, came from Syria, just across the river dividing Lebanon from current Syria, after the massacre of the Maronites on the Alasi River ( Al Asi because it flows up north). The Alkhourys came from Batroun over 300 years ago, and the Atik family was also from Syria.

== Gallery ==
These photos were taken in January 2012.

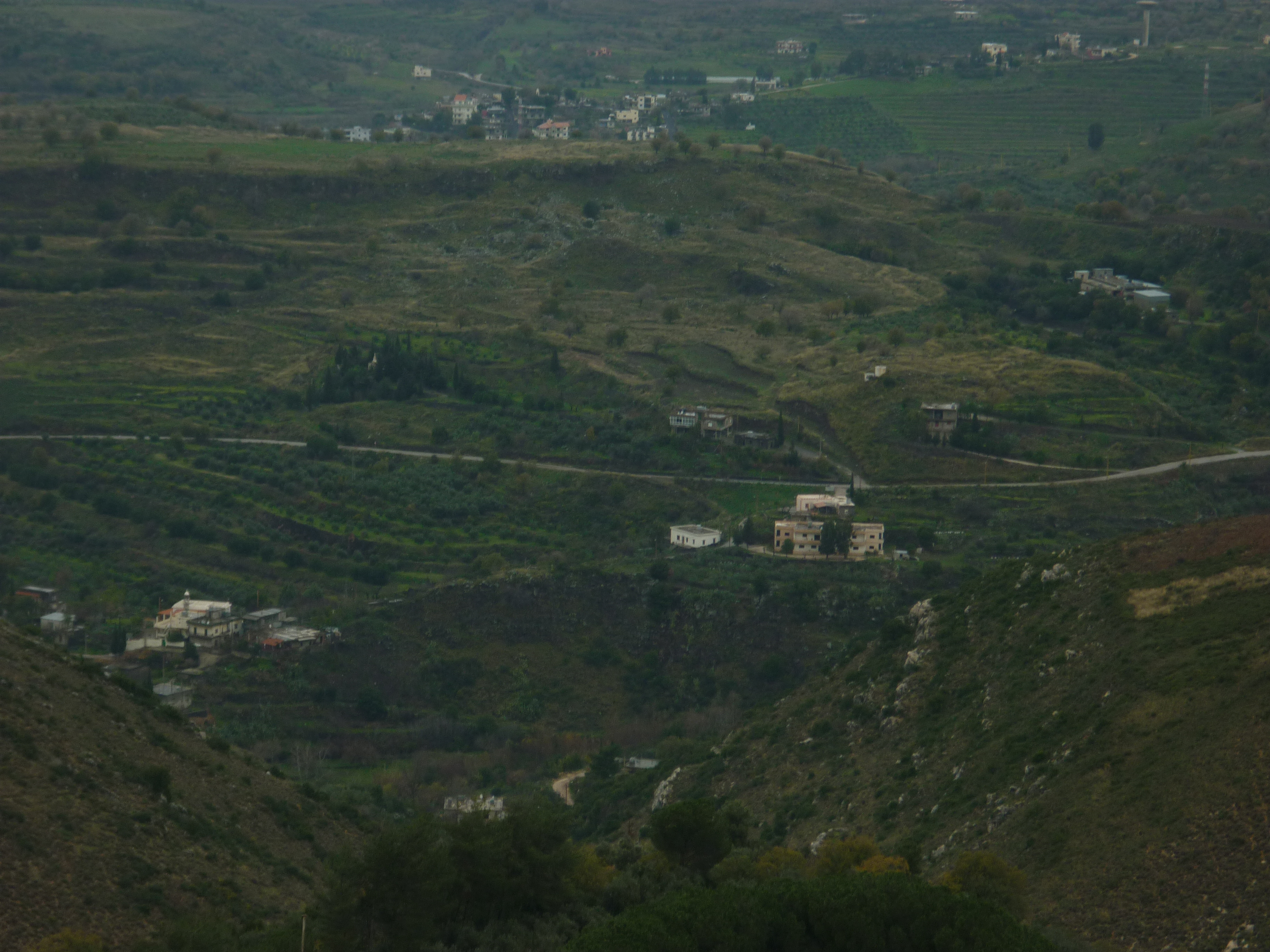
The village

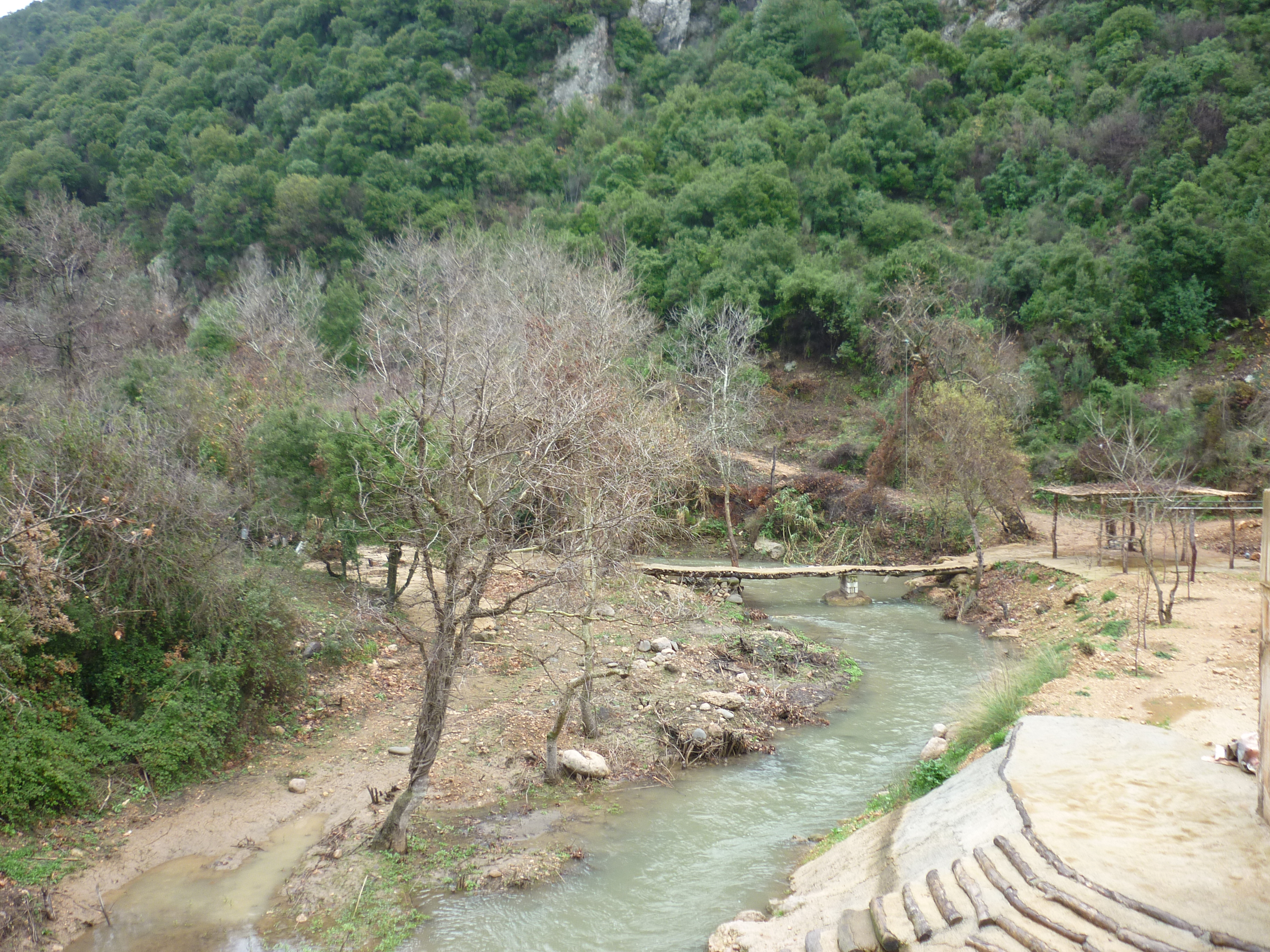
The river

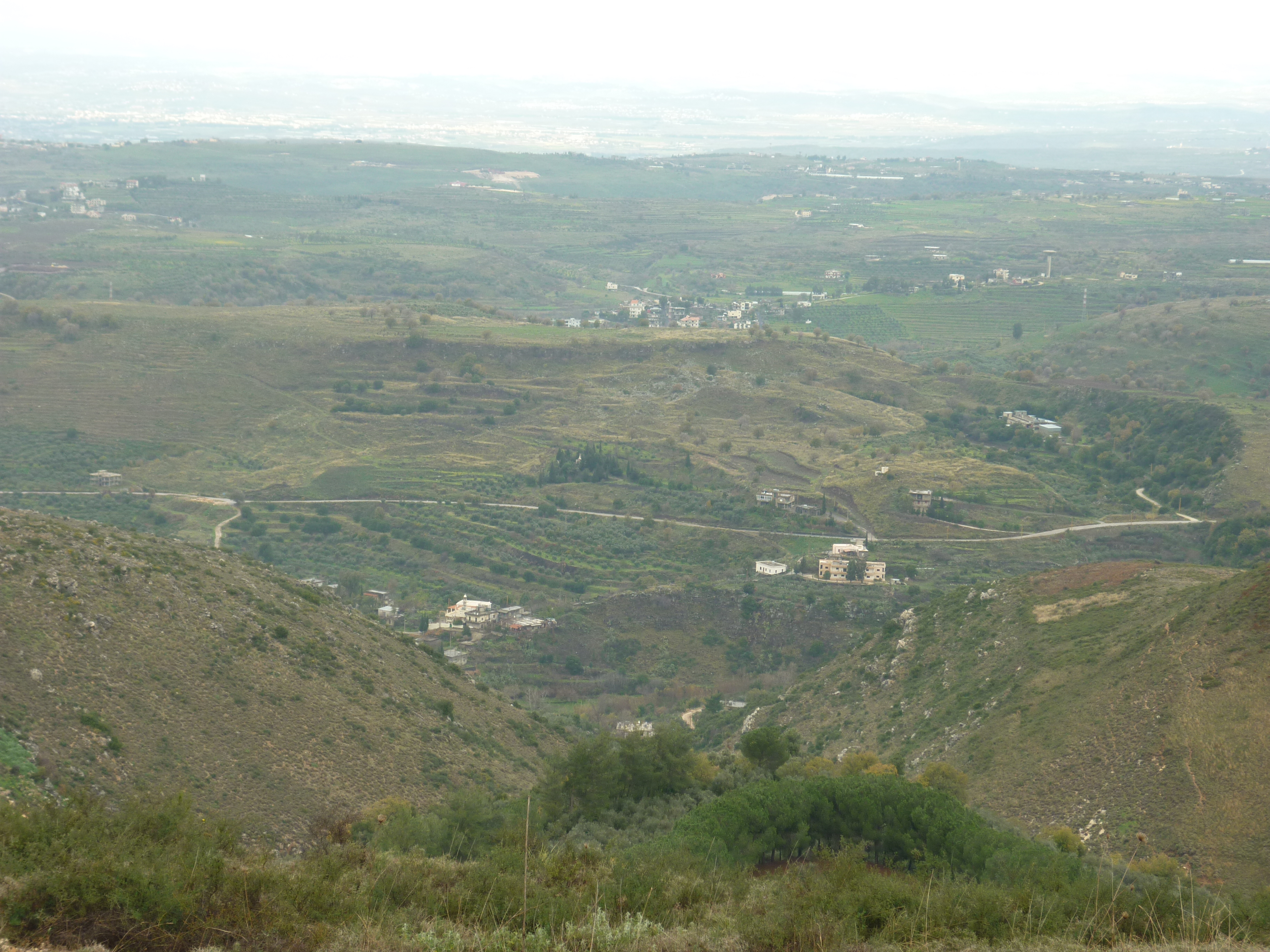
Another view of the village

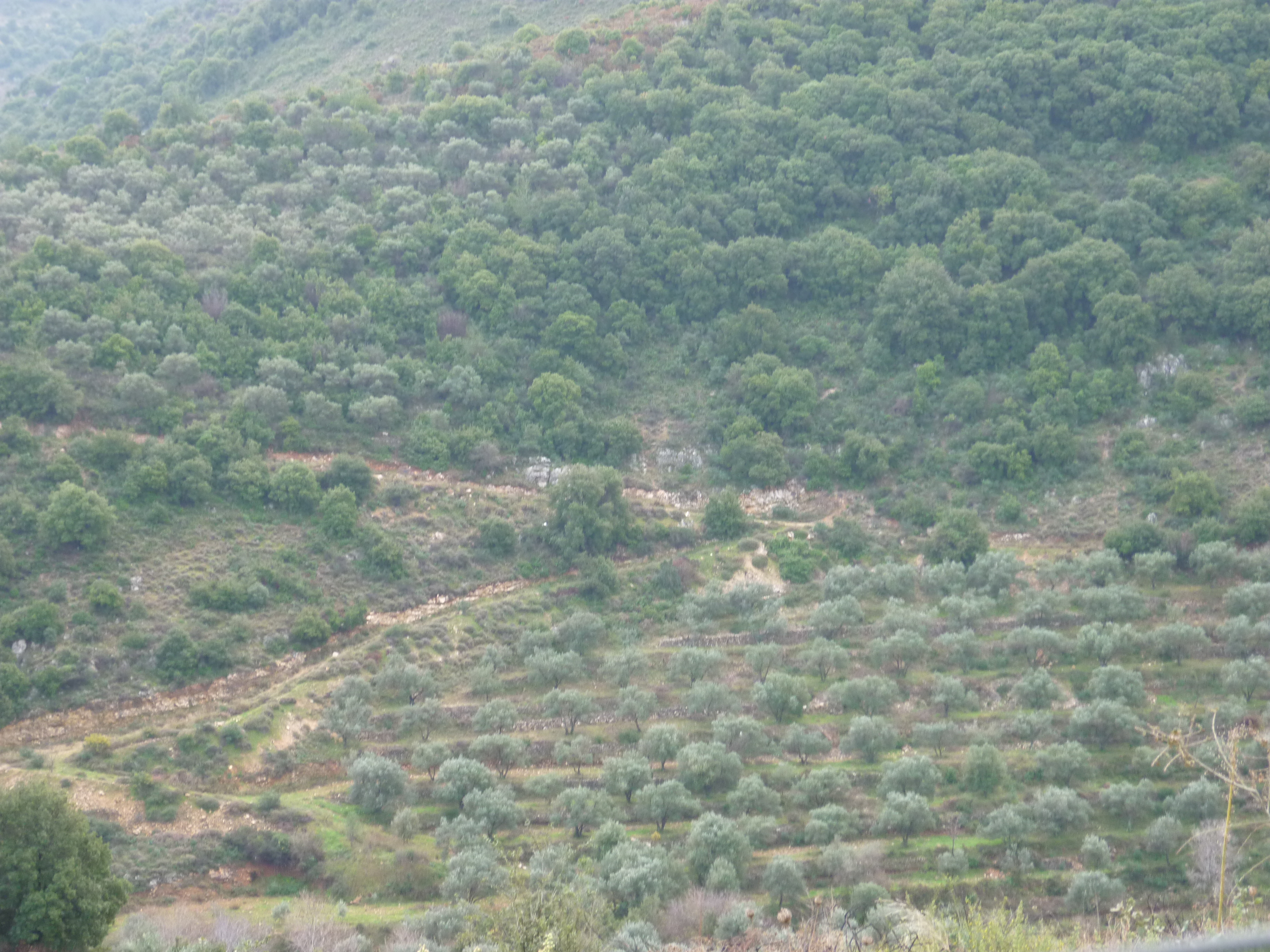
Olive groves

== Bibliography ==
- Robinson, E.; Smith, E. (1841). Biblical Researches in Palestine, Mount Sinai and Arabia Petraea: A Journal of Travels in the year 1838. Vol. 3. Boston: Crocker & Brewster.
