= Bireh, Akkar =

Bire Akkar بيرة (عكار)
- City
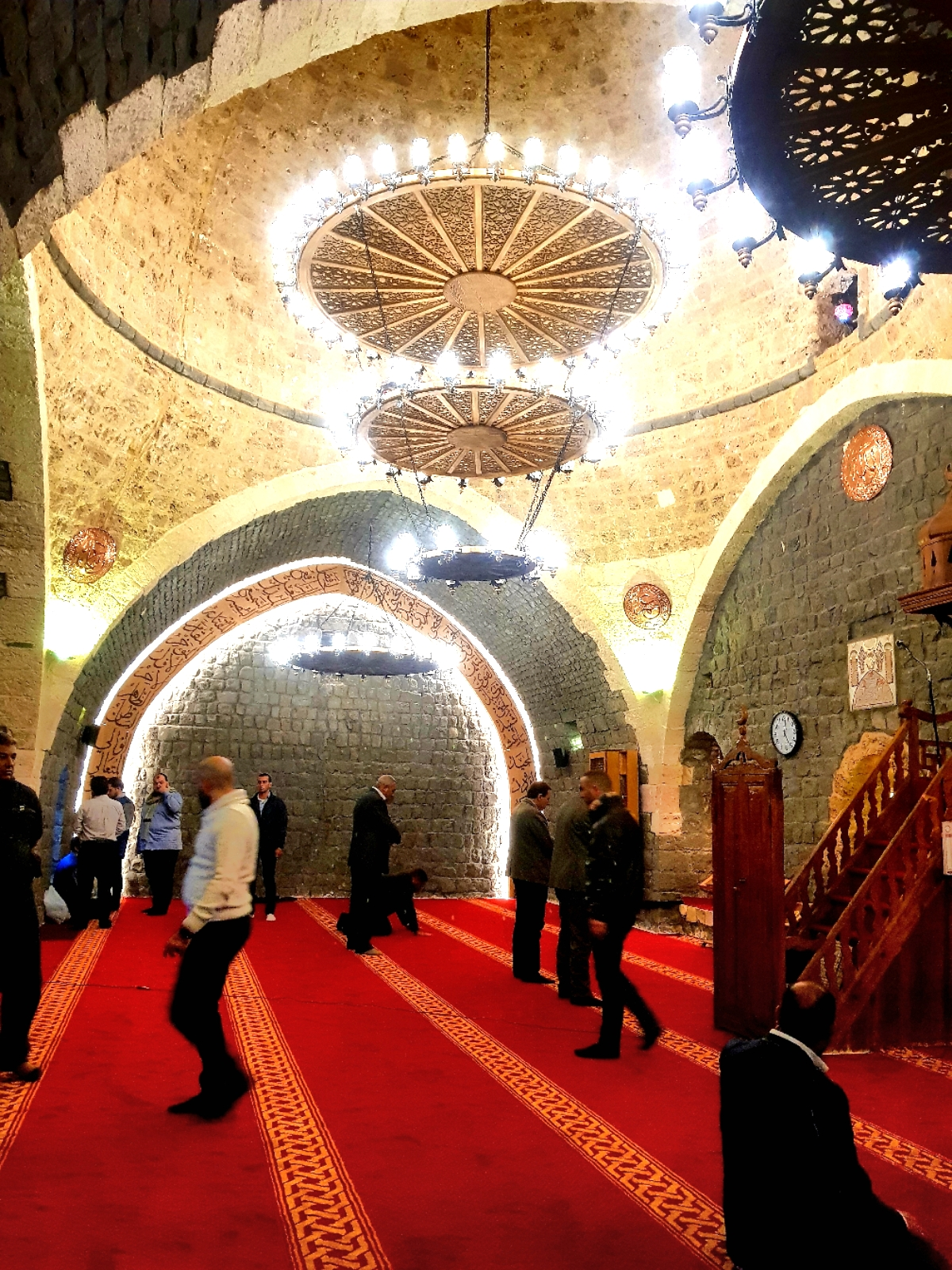
- Village mosque, 2018

- Location within Lebanon
- Coordinates: 34°35′17″N 36°14′13″E
- Country: Lebanon
- Governorate: Akkar
- District: Akkar
- Elevation: 530 m (1,740 ft)
- Time zone: UTC+2 (EET)
  - Summer (DST): UTC+3 (EEST)
- Dialing code: +961

Bire Akkar (Arabic: بيرة (عكار), romanized: Bīre (ʿAkkār)) is a small town in Akkar Governorate, Lebanon, close to the border with Syria.

The population in Bire Akkar is mainly Sunni Muslims.

== History ==
In 1838, Eli Smith noted the village, whose inhabitants were Sunni Muslim, located east of esh-Sheikh Mohammed.

== Health ==
Bireh Akkar has a Polish Health Service close to the main road, which received support of the Kulczyk Foundation.

The health center receives funding from the Polish Aid, the donor arm of Polish Ministry of Foreign Affairs, PCPM (Polish Center For International Aid). The funding has helped to secured shelter for over 35,000 Syrian refugee families fleeing from the civil war in their country, through conditional cash assistance to cover part of the rental fees for apartments or garages.

In addition to shelter, PCPM aims at providing Syrian refugees with comprehensive assistance that includes access to health care and education, as well as lifesaving assistance during the winter season. A primary health care center in Bireh, located 4km from Syrian border, coupled with a mobile clinic, caters for over 10,000 patients annually. During the winter season of 2017-18, PCPM is one of four aid agencies in Lebanon that provides Syrian refugees with cash assistance for purchase of heating oil, stoves and blankets.

== Sports ==
The most recognizable sports in Bire Akkar are football and basketball.

== Bibliography ==
- Robinson, E.; Smith, E. (1841). Biblical Researches in Palestine, Mount Sinai and Arabia Petraea: A Journal of Travels in the year 1838. Vol. 3. Boston: Crocker & Brewster.
