= Qarha, Akkar =

Qarha قرحة
- Village
- Location in Lebanon
- Coordinates: 34°37′16″N 36°26′40″E
- Country: Lebanon
- Governorate: Akkar
- District: Akkar
- Time zone: UTC+2 (EET)
  - Summer (DST): +3

Qarha (Arabic: قرحة, romanized: Qarḥah) is a village located in the Akkar District of the Akkar Governorate in Lebanon. Its inhabitants are predominantly Alawite Muslims.
