= Wehbe Katicha =

Lebanese politician

Wehbe Katicha وهبي قاطيشا

Retired General from the Lebanese Armed Forces
- In office 1964–1999

Personal details
- Born: 18 May 1943 (age 82) Chadra, Lebanon

Wehbe Katicha (Arabic: وهبي قاطيشا, born in 1943) is a Lebanese politician and a former general in the Lebanese Army.

He was, as of 2022, a representative in the Lebanese parliament, having been elected in May 2018 as a candidate of the Lebanese Forces party in Akkar.

== Personal life and background ==
Katicha was born to a Greek Orthodox family in Chadra, Akkar. He attended several elementary schools in Akkar then Apôtres high school in Jounieh and Furn el-Chebek's public high school. He joined the army in 1964 and stayed until his resignation in 1999. He earned a bachelor's degree in political science from the Lebanese University in 1980. Between 1999 and 2008, he wrote weekly military and political analysis about regional and international topics in Al-Massira magazine and other Lebanese and Arab newspapers. He was also a frequent guest of Lebanese TVs during recent armed conflicts, namely Iraq War and July War.

== Military career ==
Katicha followed successfully the Lebanese officer commissioning program and graduated first in his class as a Lieutenant in 1967. He then traveled to France in 1968 for a one-year training and pursued several training sessions in Lebanon, Egypt and France between 1972 and 1985.

=== Dates of ranks ===
- Platoon Commander: 1968
- Company Commander: 1970
- Battalion Commander: 1981
- Brigadier General: 1994

== See also ==
- Lebanese Forces
