= Akroum =

Akroum أكروم
- Village
- Akroum in Lebanon
- Coordinates: 34°32′38″N 36°21′47″E
- Country: Lebanon
- Governorate: Akkar
- District: Akkar

Area
  - Total: 8.814 km^{2} (3.403 sq mi)
- Elevation: 880 m (2,890 ft)

Population (2009)
  - Total: 1,518 eligible voters
  - Density: 172.2/km^{2} (446.1/sq mi)

Akroum (Arabic: أكروم, romanized: ʾAkrūm) is a Sunni Muslim village located in the Akkar District in Lebanon. The area has mountains with many villages on it. It is located at an altitude of approximately 1087 meters. The approximate population of this area is 11,194.

== Demographics ==
In 2014, Muslims made up 99.77% of registered voters in Akroum. 97.49% of the voters were Sunni Muslims.
