= Universidad Central del Este =

Private university in the San Pedro de Macorís, Dominican Republic

- Type: Private
- Established: October 15, 1970; 55 years ago
- Founders: José Hazim Azar
- Rector: José Hazim Torres
- Location: San Pedro de Macorís, Dominican Republic; 18.45936°N 69.29503°W
- Website: http://www.uce.edu.do/
- Location in the Dominican Republic

Eastern Central University (Spanish: Universidad Central del Este; abbreviated as UCE) is a private university in the Dominican Republic, founded in San Pedro de Macorís on October 15, 1970, in the eastern region of the country. The university's Department of Medicine operates an important medical center located in the center of Santo Domingo. At an undergraduate level, the UCE has twelve academic departments: Medicine, Dentistry, Bioanalysis, Pharmaceutics, Business Sciences, Systems, Tourism, Production Sciences, Construction Sciences, Natural Resources, Law, and Social and Public Communication. The Dominican State officially recognized the institution through the Presidential Decree N°. 1205, on July 2, 1971.

== Short history ==
UCE was founded at a time in which the Dominican Republic only counted with a handful of other universities nationwide, which included the Autonomous University of Santo Domingo (UASD), founded by Pope Paul III in 1538; the Catholic University Mother and Teacher (now Pontifical) founded in Santiago in 1962; and the National University Pedro Henríquez Ureña (UNPHU), founded in 1966.

The creation of UCE marked the beginning of an expansion period in Dominican higher education. During the 1970s, ten universities were inaugurated, UCE being the first of them. During the 1980s, a period during which UCE expanded across the country, ten other universities saw their beginnings. An initiative of Dr. José A. Hazim Azar, UCE was first conceived as a Regional Institution: there were no higher education campuses or institutions in the eastern region of the country. For its creation, Hazim counted on the cooperation of important personalities of San Pedro de Macorís, some of them members of the chamber of commerce of the province. Nowadays, UCE has expanded to include several campuses nationwide, largely due to public demand. In 1980, the first extension was built in the province of El Seybo. The campus of La Romana in 1982 followed, as did the extensions of San Juan de la Maguana, San Cristóbal, and Santo Domingo, in 1983. Later, on September 11, 1984, through the presidential Decree No. 2333, UCE was authorized to open ten more extensions in several communities across the nation: Barahona, Pedernales, Neyba, Duvergé, Elías Piña, Las Matas de Farfán, Dajabón, Monte Cristi, Bayaguana, and Monte Plata.

== Notable faculty ==
Some notable faculty include:

- Joseph A. Chiarella, MD, Graduate of the UCE Escuela de Medicina, the Chief Medical Officer for New York Community and State Health Plan.
- Jose Manuel Glass Gutierrez
- Ilaria Mannuccir, historian
- Geovanny Vicente, political strategist and CNN columnist who is an associate professor for Columbia University
