= Halba, Lebanon =

Halba حلبا
- Town
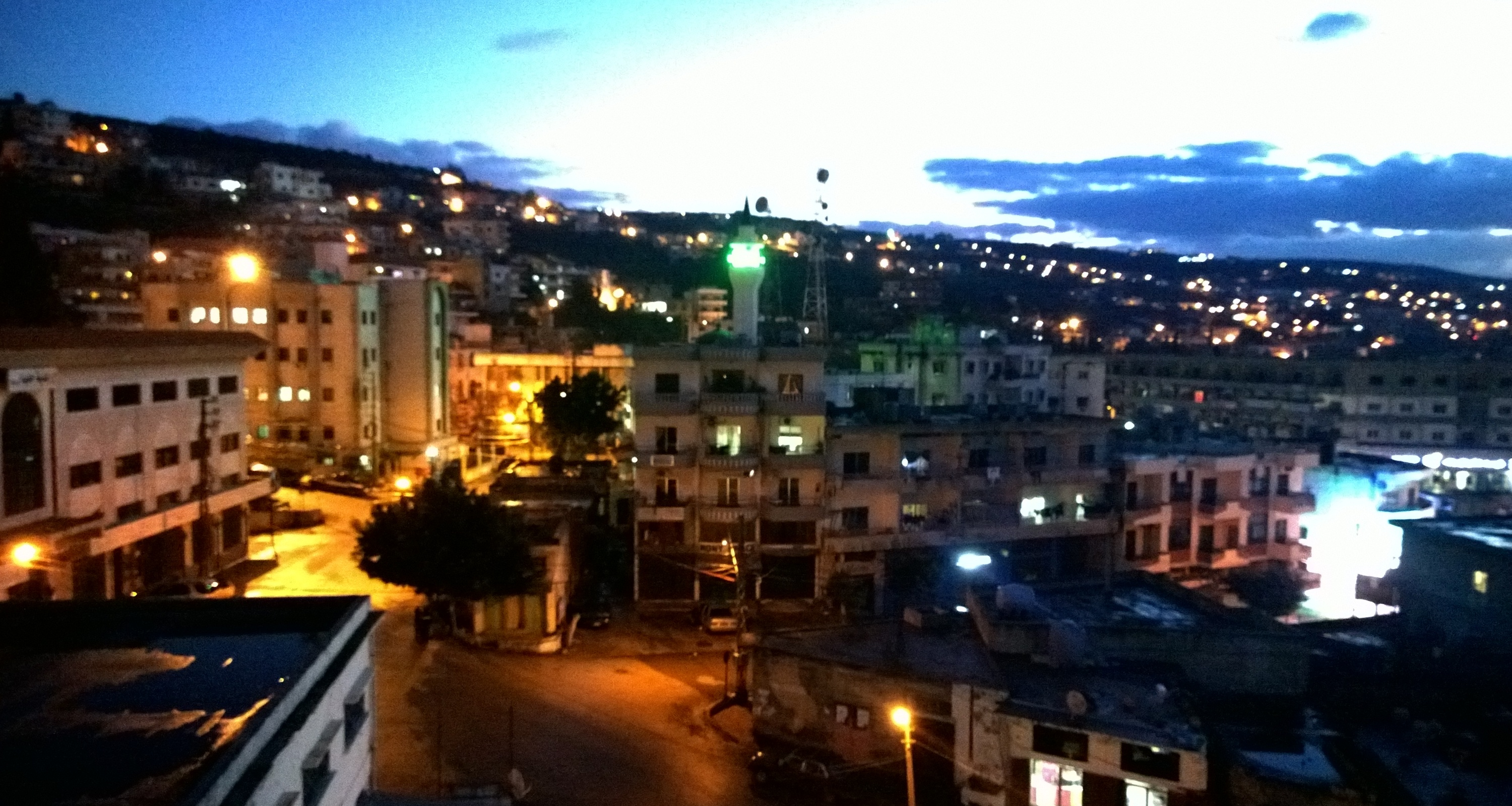
- Halba at night

- Location within Lebanon
- Coordinates: 34°33′2″N 36°4′41″E
- Country: Lebanon
- Governorate: Akkar Governorate
- District: Akkar District

Government
  - Mayor: Abdul Hamid Ahmad al-Halabi (Independent)
- Elevation: 167 m (548 ft)

Population (2013)
  - Total: 4,730 eligible voters
- Time zone: UTC+2 (EET)
  - Summer (DST): UTC+3 (EEST)
- Dialing code: +961

Halba (Arabic: حلبا, romanized: Ḥalbā) is the capital of Akkar Governorate in northern Lebanon, close to the border with Syria. It is located at around 34°33′2″N 36°4′41″E. Its population is divided between Sunni Muslims, Greek Orthodox, Maronites, and followers of other religions.

== History ==
In 1838, American missionary Eli Smith noted the village – whose inhabitants were Greek Orthodox – located west of Cheikh Mohammad.

In 1856, it was named Halba in the Kiepert maps of Palestine and Jerusalem published that year.

Halba is home to the Sada Akkar newspaper, the only privately owned news agency in Akkar District. Halba is also home to a Lebanese Red Cross First Aid Center.

== Demographics ==
In 2014, Muslims made up 61.49% and Christians made up 38.27% of registered voters in Halba. 60.76% of the voters were Sunni Muslims, 26.46% were Greek Orthodox and 8.50% were Maronite Catholics.

== Bibliography ==
- Robinson, E.; Smith, E. (1841). Biblical Researches in Palestine, Mount Sinai and Arabia Petraea: A Journal of Travels in the year 1838. Vol. 3. Boston: Crocker & Brewster.
