= Cheikh Mohammad =

Cheikh Mohammad الشيخ محمد
- Village
- Location in Lebanon
- Coordinates: 34°33′00″N 36°05′00″E
- Country: Lebanon
- Governorate: Akkar
- District: Akkar
- Elevation: 720 ft (220 m)
- Time zone: UTC+2 (EET)
  - Summer (DST): +3

Cheikh Mohammad (Arabic: الشيخ محمد, romanized: ash-Shaykh Muḥammad) is a village situated in Akkar Governorate, Lebanon. Situated 400 metres above sea level, in between two mountains, it overlooks the Akkar plains and sea. It is made up of approximately 450 houses, with 99% of the population being Christian, mostly Greek Orthodox, Melkite Catholics and Maronites. This small village contains two schools, a primary and secondary as well as two churches, one dating back hundreds of years. It also has the first hospital in Akkar, named "Akkar Rahal Hospital".

== History ==
In 1838, Eli Smith noted the village, whose inhabitants were Greek Orthodox, located in the 'Akkar region.

In 1856 it was named Sheikh Muhammed on Kiepert's map of Palestine/Lebanon published that year.

== Village life ==
The village is divided into two sections, the upper and the lower. The upper is predominantly made up of the Fares, Bitar, Khoury and Al Rahbawy families. The lower is predominantly made up of the Fares El-Cheikh, Rahal, Mahfoud, Boustani, Taoum, Helwe, and Yaacoub families. Although many of the families members have travelled abroad to escape the civil war of 1975–1990, many have returned in recent years. Many of them have also expanded and moved to many countries including Australia, United States of America, Canada, France, Brazil, Venezuela and Argentina.

Cheikh Mohammad is a five-minute walk away from Halba, the capital city of Akkar Governorate, providing quick access to all household needs.

== Bibliography ==
- Robinson, E.; Smith, E. (1841). Biblical Researches in Palestine, Mount Sinai and Arabia Petraea: A Journal of Travels in the year 1838. Vol. 3. Boston: Crocker & Brewster.
