= Telephone numbers in Lebanon =

- Location of Lebanon in dark green
- Country: Lebanon
- Continent: Asia
- NSN length: 7 digits (landline) 8 digits (new area codes with 2 added to all local numbers) 8 (mobile)
- Country code: +961
- International access: 00
- Long-distance: 0

In Lebanon, the area codes are, including the leading 0, two, three or four

== Dialling ==
- National: xx-xxx-xxx
- International: +961 xx-xxx-xxx

== Area codes ==
- 01 : Beirut and its Metropolitan area
- 02 : No longer in use (was previously used to call Syria)
- 030 : Mobile operators - MIC2 (touch)
- 031 : Mobile operators - MIC1 (alfa)
- 032 : Mobile operators - MIC1 (alfa)
- 033 : Mobile operators - MIC1 (alfa)
- 034 : Mobile operators - MIC1 (alfa)
- 035 : Mobile operators - MIC1 (alfa)
- 036 : Mobile operators - MIC2 (touch)
- 037 : Mobile operators - MIC2 (touch)
- 038 : Mobile operators - MIC2 (touch)
- 039 : Mobile operators - MIC2 (to)
- 04 : Mount Lebanon, Metn Caza
- 05 : Mount Lebanon, Baabda Caza + Aley Caza + Chouf Caza
- 06 : North Lebanon (includes Akkar)
- 07 : South Lebanon (This includes some towns on the southern part of Mount Lebanon)
- 070 0 : Mobile operators - MIC2 (touch)
- 070 1 : Mobile operators - MIC1 (alfa)
- 070 2 : Mobile operators - MIC1 (alfa)
- 070 3 : Mobile operators - MIC1 (alfa)
- 070 4 : Mobile operators - MIC1 (alfa)
- 070 5 : Mobile operators - MIC1 (alfa)
- 070 6 : Mobile operators - MIC (touch)
- 070 7 : Mobile operators - MIC2 (touch)
- 070 8 : Mobile operators - MIC2 (touch)
- 070 9 : Mobile operators - MIC2 (touch)
- 071 0 : Mobile operators - MIC1 (alfa)
- 071 1 : Mobile operators - MIC2 (touch)
- 071 2 : Mobile operators - MIC2 (touch)
- 071 3 : Mobile operators - MIC2 (touch)
- 071 4 : Mobile operators - MIC2 (touch)
- 071 5 : Mobile operators - MIC2 (touch)
- 071 6 : Mobile operators - MIC1 (alfa)
- 071 7 : Mobile operators - MIC1 (alfa)
- 071 8 : Mobile operators - MIC1 (alfa)
- 071 9 : Mobile operators - MIC1 (alfa)
- 076 0 : Mobile operators - MIC2 (touch)
- 076 1 : Mobile operators - MIC1 (alfa)
- 076 3 : Mobile operators - MIC1 (alfa)
- 076 4 : Mobile operators - MIC1 (alfa)
- 076 5 : Mobile operators - MIC1 (alfa)
- 076 6 : Mobile operators - MIC2 (touch)
- 076 7 : Mobile operators - MIC2 (touch)
- 076 8 : Mobile operators - MIC2 (touch)
- 076 9 : Mobile operators - MIC2 (touch)
- 078 7 : Mobile operators - MIC2 (touch)
- 078 8 : Mobile operators - MIC2 (touch)
- 078 9 : Mobile operators - MIC2 (touch)
- 079 0 : Mobile operators - MIC2 (touch)
- 079 1 : Mobile operators - MIC1 (alfa)
- 079 2 : Mobile operators - MIC1 (alfa)
- 079 3 : Mobile operators - MIC1 (alfa)
- 08 : Bekaa and Baalbek-Hermel
- 081 2 : Mobile operators - MIC1 (alfa)
- 081 3 : Mobile operators - MIC1 (alfa)
- 081 4 : Mobile operators - MIC1 (alfa)
- 081 6 : Mobile operators - MIC2 (Touch)
- 081 7 : Mobile operators - MIC2 (Touch)
- 081 8 : Mobile operators - MIC2 (Touch)
- 09 : Mount Lebanon, Kesrouan Caza + Byblos Caza
- 10: MMS (119)
