= Akkar District =

Akkar قضاء عكار
- District
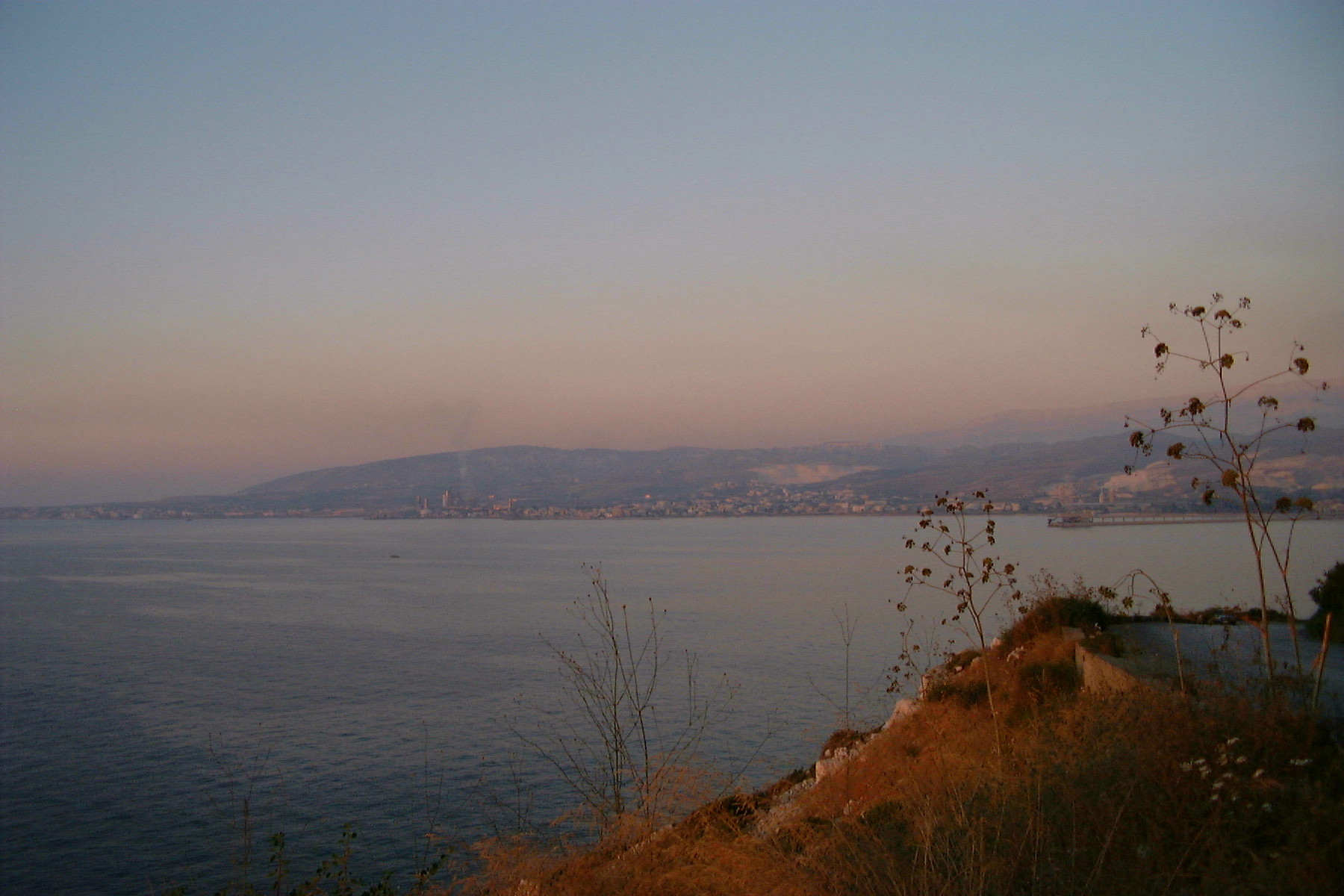
- Coastline

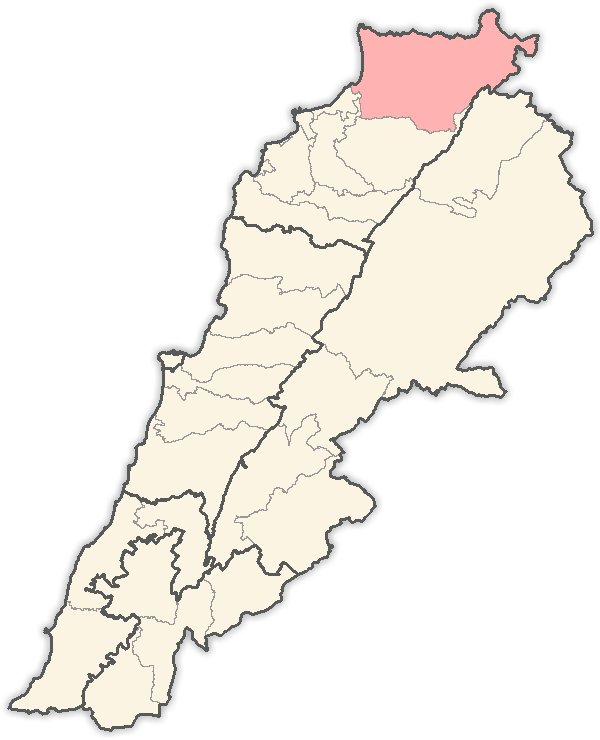
- Location in Lebanon
- Coordinates (Halba): 34°33′02″N 036°04′41″E
- Country: Lebanon
- Governorate: Akkar

Area
  - Total: 788 km^{2} (304 sq mi)

Population
  - Estimate (31 December 2017): 423,596
- Time zone: UTC+2 (EET)
  - Summer (DST): UTC+3 (EEST)

Akkar District (Arabic: قضاء عكار) is the only district in Akkar Governorate, Lebanon. It is coextensive with the governorate and covers an area of 788 km^{2} (304 sq mi). The UNHCR estimated the population of the district to be 389,899 in 2015, including 106,935 registered refugees of the Syrian Civil War and 19,404 Palestinian refugees. The capital is at Halba.

The district is characterized by the presence of a relatively large coastal plain, with high mountains to the east. The largest cities in Akkar are Halba, Bire Akkar and Al-Qoubaiyat.

Akkar has many important Roman and Arabic archaeological sites. One of the most famous archaeological sites and the birthplace of the Roman emperor Severus Alexander (d.235) is the Tell of Arqa near the town of Miniara. Several prehistoric sites were found in the Akkar plain foothills that were suggested to have been used by the Heavy Neolithic Qaraoun culture at the dawn of the Neolithic Revolution.

Akkar can be divided into seven parts: Qaitea (القيطع), Jouma (الجومة), Dreib (الدريب), Jabal Akroum (جبل أكروم), Wadi Khaled (وادي خالد), Cheft (الشفت) and As-Sahel (السهل).

== History ==
The Akkar governate is strategically important as it is the northern gateway into Syria. Explaining the exercising of political and military influence by the "Al Merehb/ﺁل مرعب" family of sharifian lineage which ruled the territory of Akkar, even extending it's homeland to Tripoli, Lebanon and Hama till the end of the Ottoman Empire since their arrival in the early 18th century.

During the 1970s the peasants of Akkar formed an alliance to fight the land owners and the system of which 3% of the population held about 73% of the land. They were led by Khalid Saghiya, a Syrian Baathist lawyer from Baynu. Following Black September in Jordan, firearms were accessible to all. A fact that escalated the revolt. The involvement of Syria in the area as well as the diverse population led to many rivalries. Franjieh and the Phalange were rivals. Peasant laborers clashed with landlords, while Jurd clans, though occasionally in conflict with one another, had formed an alliance against the beys. Eventually the discovery of oil in the gulf led to mass immigration, sparing the region and its population from the fate that came to many other parts of Lebanon.

== Geography ==
Akkar is divided into the following regions:

- Al-Jouma: represents multiple villages connected to each other by a network of roads, and is located around fertile land that enable it to adopt greenhouse and fruit crops.
- Najd Akkar: It is divided into three sub-regions according to the geographical situation that makes the crops change according to the height and irrigation: Al-Shafat, Al-Dreib Al-Awsat, Al-Dreib Al-A'la
- The plateaus where the al-Qayt'a region is.
- Jarad Akkar: It occupies an area in the east of the entire region, starting from the borders of the Akkar governorate to Abu Musa River in the south to the Syrian border in the north, and it consists of the following villages.
- The plain: in itself it is the source of agricultural wealth, where its inhabitants live from the land, and 6% of the properties include half of the lands.

== Demographics ==
According to registered voters in 2014, 2022 and 2026:

Year	Christians					Muslims				Druze
Year	Total	Greek Orthodox	Maronites	Greek Catholics	Other Christians	Total	Sunnis	Alawites	Shias	Druze
2014	27.55%	14.24%	11.47%	1.28%	0.56%	72.26%	66.23%	4.86%	1.17%	0.01%
2018	26.55%	13.54%	11.05%	1.23%	0.73%	73.44%	67.30%	4.95%	1.19%	0.01%
2022	26.75%	13.66%	11.01%	1.57%	0.51%	73.25%	66.92%	5.15%	1.18%	0.00%
2026	23.78%	13.18%	9.77%	0.58%	0.25%	76.22%	69.93%	5.24%	1.05%	0.00%

This region is home to the second-largest population of Alawites in Lebanon. Lebanese Turks form a majority in Kouachra and Aydamun.

Number of registered voters (21+ years old) over the years.

Years	Men	Women	Total	Growth (%)
2009	111,300	112,238	223,538	—N/a
2010	115,920 ▲	114,751 ▲	230,671 ▲	+3.09% ▲
2011	117,264 ▲	117,251 ▲	234,515 ▲	+1.64% ▼
2012	119,519 ▲	119,738 ▲	239,257 ▲	+1.98% ▲
2013	125,793 ▲	125,894 ▲	251,687 ▲	+4.94% ▲
2014	128,544 ▲	128,977 ▲	257,521 ▲	+2.26% ▼
2015	131,161 ▲	132,107 ▲	263,268 ▲	+3.32% ▲
2016	134,199 ▲	135,711 ▲	269,910 ▲	+2.46% ▼
2017	137,679 ▲	139,259 ▲	276,938 ▲	+2.54% ▲
2018	141,239 ▲	142,551 ▲	283,790 ▲	+2.41% ▼
2019	145,181 ▲	145,726 ▲	290,907 ▲	+2.44% ▲
2020	148,659 ▲	148,937 ▲	297,596 ▲	+2.25% ▼
2021	151,575 ▲	151,480 ▲	303,055 ▲	+1.80% ▼
2022	154,968 ▲	154,549 ▲	309,517 ▲	+2.09% ▲
2023	157,469 ▲	156,915 ▲	314,384 ▲	+1.55% ▼
2024	160,626 ▲	159,815 ▲	320,441 ▲	+1.89% ▲
2025	163,542 ▲	162,439 ▲	325,981 ▲	+1.70% ▼
2026	—N/a	—N/a	331,943 ▲	+1.80% ▲
Source: DGCS
