= Akkar Governorate =

Governorate of Lebanon

Akkar Arabic: محافظة عكار
- Governorate
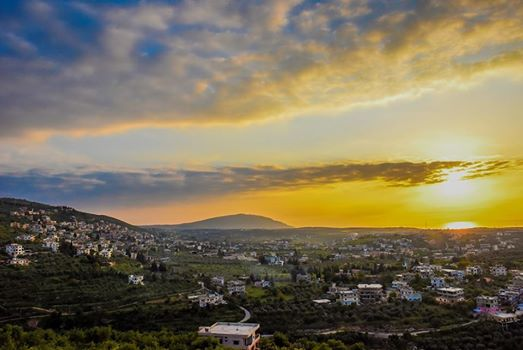
- Berkayel, Akkar Governorate

- Location of Akkar Governorate in Lebanon
- Coordinates: 34.5°N 36.2°E
- Country: Lebanon
- District: Akkar District
- Gazetted: 16 July 2003
- Capital: Halba

Government
  - Governor: Imad Labaki (Independent)

Area
  - Total: 788.4 km^{2} (304.4 sq mi)

Population (31 December 2017)
  - Total: 423,596
  - Density: 537.3/km^{2} (1,392/sq mi)
- Time zone: UTC+2 (EET)
  - Summer (DST): UTC+3 (EEST)

Akkar Governorate (Arabic: محافظة عكار, romanized: Muḥāfaẓat ʿAkkār) is the northernmost governorate of Lebanon. It comprises the single district of Akkar, which in turn is subdivided into 121 municipalities. The capital is at Halba. It covers an area of 788 km^{2} (304 sq mi) and is bounded by the Mediterranean Sea to the west, North Governorate to the south, Baalbek-Hermel Governorate to the southeast, and the Syrian governorates of Tartus and Homs to the north and northeast. The governorate's western coastal plain constitutes Lebanon's second largest agricultural region after the Beqaa Valley, while the east features forested mountains that have been considered for protection as a national park.

The UNHCR estimated the population of the governorate at 389,899 in 2015, including 106,935 registered refugees of the Syrian Civil War and 19,404 Palestinian refugees. The number of Syrian refugees had increased slightly to 109,353 by October 2026. The population is predominantly Sunni Muslim around 70-75% with a minority of Christian and Alawite communities and very few Shiites. Akkar is Lebanon's least urbanized governorate, with 80% of the population living in rural areas.

Akkar Governorate was created by the enactment of Law 522 on 16 July 2003, in which Akkar District was separated from North Governorate. Implementation of the new region only began in 2014 with the appointment of the first and current governor, Imad Labaki, and remains incomplete as of 2017.

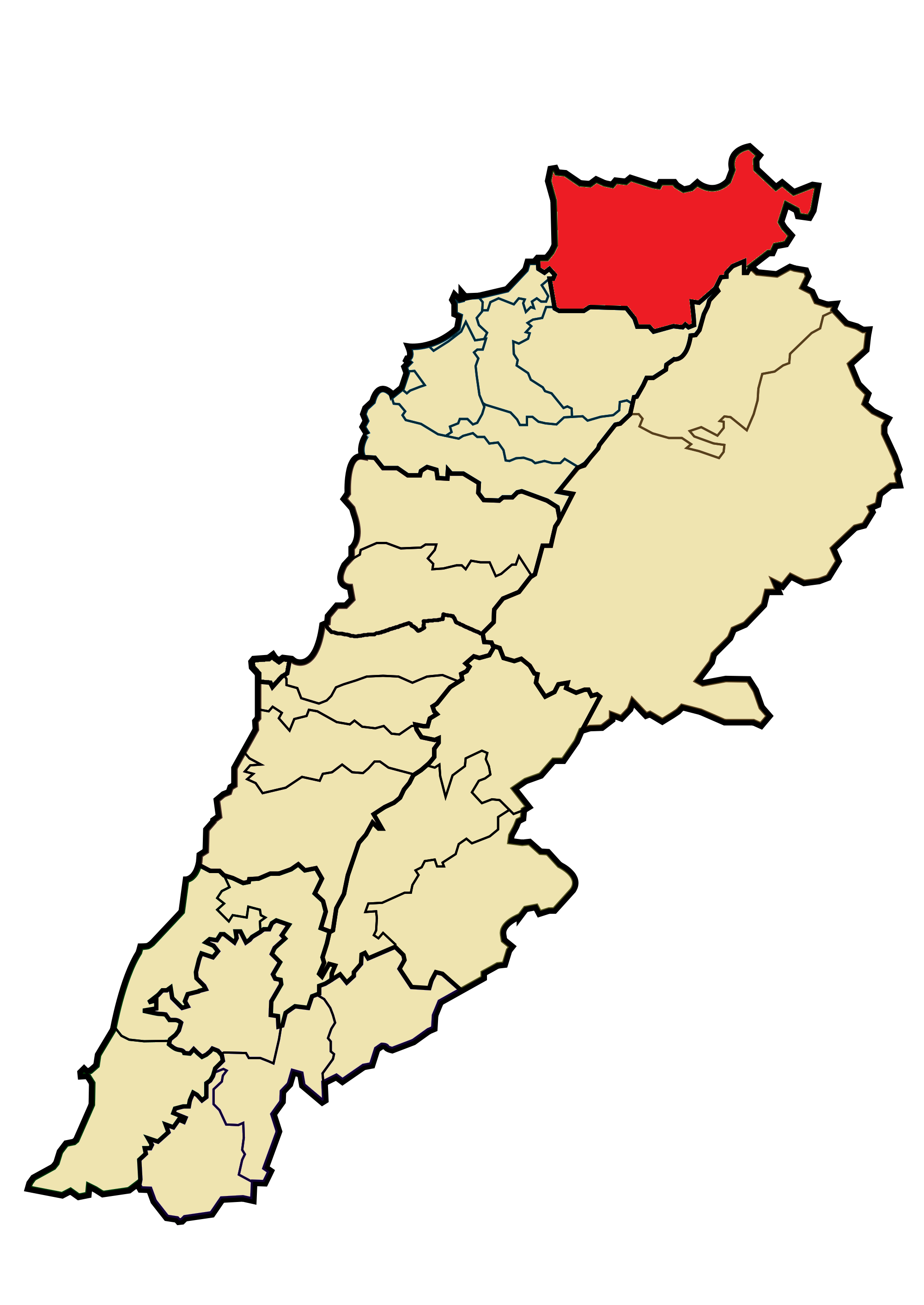
Akkar Governorate

Historically marginalized and neglected by the central government, Akkar is Lebanon's poorest region and has the country's highest illiteracy rate, and suffers from lack of basic infrastructure and services. The recent influx of Syrian refugees has exacerbated these problems, with the unemployment rate in the governorate reaching almost 60% in 2015.

== Demographics ==
According to registered voters in 2014:

Religion in the Akkar Governorate
1. Sunni Islam (66.2%)
2. Shia Islam (1.17%)
3. Alawite (4.86%)
4. Christianity (27.6%)
5. Other (0.19%)

Year	Christians					Muslims				Druze
Year	Total	Greek Orthodox	Maronites	Greek Catholics	Other Christians	Total	Sunnis	Alawites	Shias	Druze
2014	27.55%	14.24%	11.47%	1.28%	0.56%	72.26%	66.23%	4.86%	1.17%	0.01%
