= Nehme =

Nehme (Arabic: نعمة), also spelled Naameh, Nima, or Naama, is an Arabic word meaning "blessing" or "grace", and may refer to:

== People ==
- Nehme (given name), an Arabic given name
- Nehme (surname), a Lebanese surname

== Other uses ==
- Haret en Naameh, a Lebanese town
- Naameh, Iran, an Iranian village
- Nehmeh (company), a Qatari company

== See also ==
- Kafr Ni'ma, a Palestinian town
- Naama Bay, an Egyptian natural bay
- Nameh Beyt Hardan, an Iranian village
- Nimatullah, a male Muslim given name
