= Bishmizzine =

Greek Orthodox village in Koura District, Lebanon

- City
- Location within Lebanon
- Coordinates: 34°19′13.0″N 35°47′50.0″E
- Country: Lebanon
- Governorate: North Governorate
- District: Koura District
- Elevation: 275 m (902 ft)
- Time zone: UTC+2 (EET)
  - Summer (DST): UTC+3 (EEST)
- Dialing code: +961

Bishmizzine (Arabic: بشمزين, romanized: Bishmizzīn), also spelled Bechmizzine, Bechmezzine, or Beshmizzine, is a Greek Orthodox village in the Koura district of the North Governorate of Lebanon. It is about 275 meters above sea level. Bishmizzine borders the villages of Afsdik, Kfarhazir, Amioun, Fih, and Btourram.

== History ==
Partial list of the deceased in Bishmizzine as a result of the Great Famine of Lebanon in 1916

Bishmizzine has a huge historical heritage, starting from the pre-historic period. Archaeological evidence covers a period from the Paleolithic/Mesolithic Age to the Bronze Age and Iron Age, up to the late Ancient/Byzantine Age to the Islamic/Middle Age. The name Bishmizzine is thought to be derived from the Aramaic word “Bit Gismeia”, which dates back to the Neo-Assyrian Empire (911–609 B.C.).

Additionally, one of the several churches of Bishmizzine, Saydeh (Virgin Mary), dates back to the Crusader Era (between 1095 and 1291 AD) and contains the typical ecclesiastical characteristics one would see in Crusader architecture. During the Era of the Crusades in the 13th century, Bishmizzine was called Besmedin.

During World War I, Bishmizzine was one of the many towns in the Mutasarrifate of Mount Lebanon, a semi-autonomous region in the Ottoman Empire and a precursor to modern-day Lebanon, to fall victim to the Great Famine of Mount Lebanon.

In 1953, the town had a population of 998 with 180 households.

== Education ==
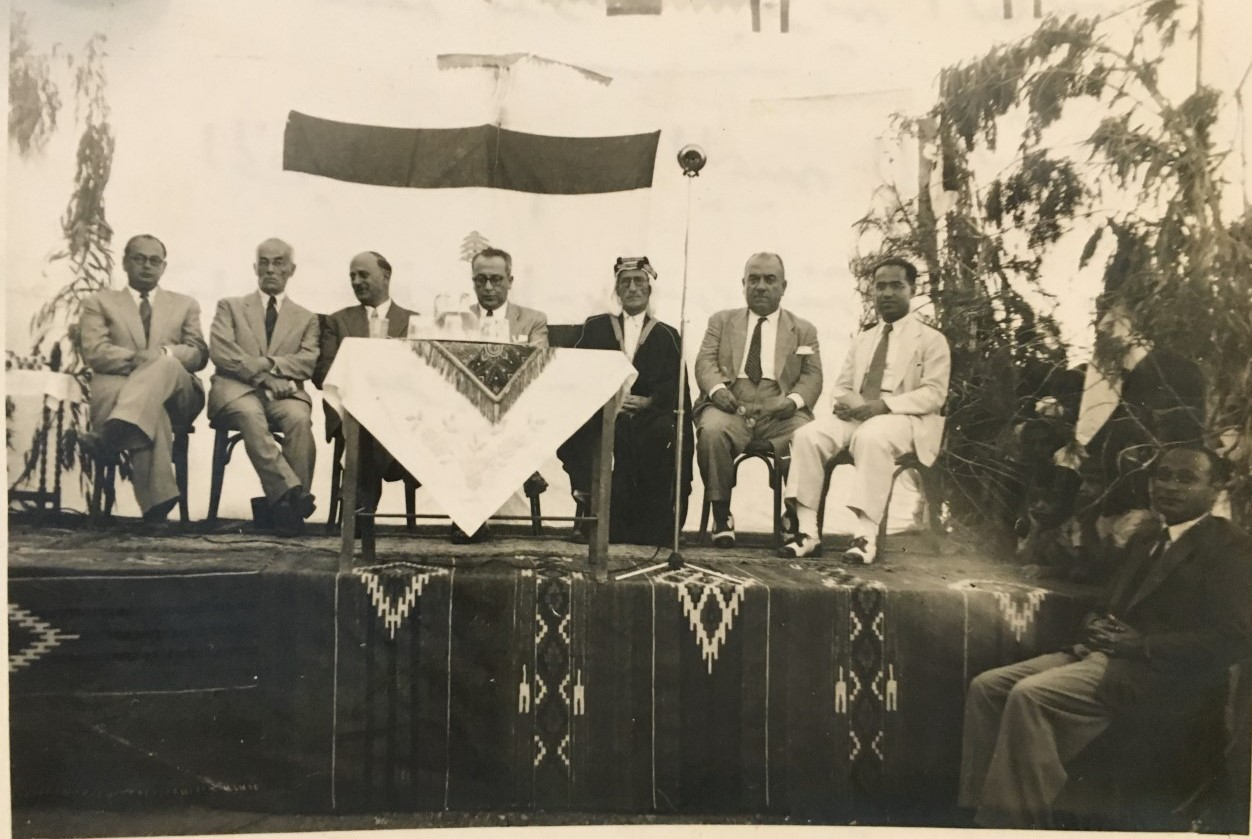
Bishmizzine High School graduation ceremony speakers in 1952

Bishmizzine High School was founded in 1937, making it one of the oldest continually operational private schools in North Lebanon. The school offers a full educational program from Nursery to Baccalaureate II designed to be compatible with the requirements of the Lebanese Ministry of Education.

== Notable people ==
- Adma d'Heurle (1924–2019), American psychologist
- Nicolas Hayek (1928–2010), Lebanese-Swiss businessman, co-founder and CEO of the Swatch Group; his father was born in Bishmizzine and Hayek spent his childhood holidays and summers in the village
- Afif I. Tannous (born 1905), Lebanese-American rural sociologist and US Department of Agriculture official, whose 1940 Cornell doctoral thesis on Bishmizzine was the earliest academic study of the village
