= Zakroun =

Maronite village in Koura District, Lebanon

Coordinates: 34°21′N 35°45′E

Zakroun زكرون
- Village
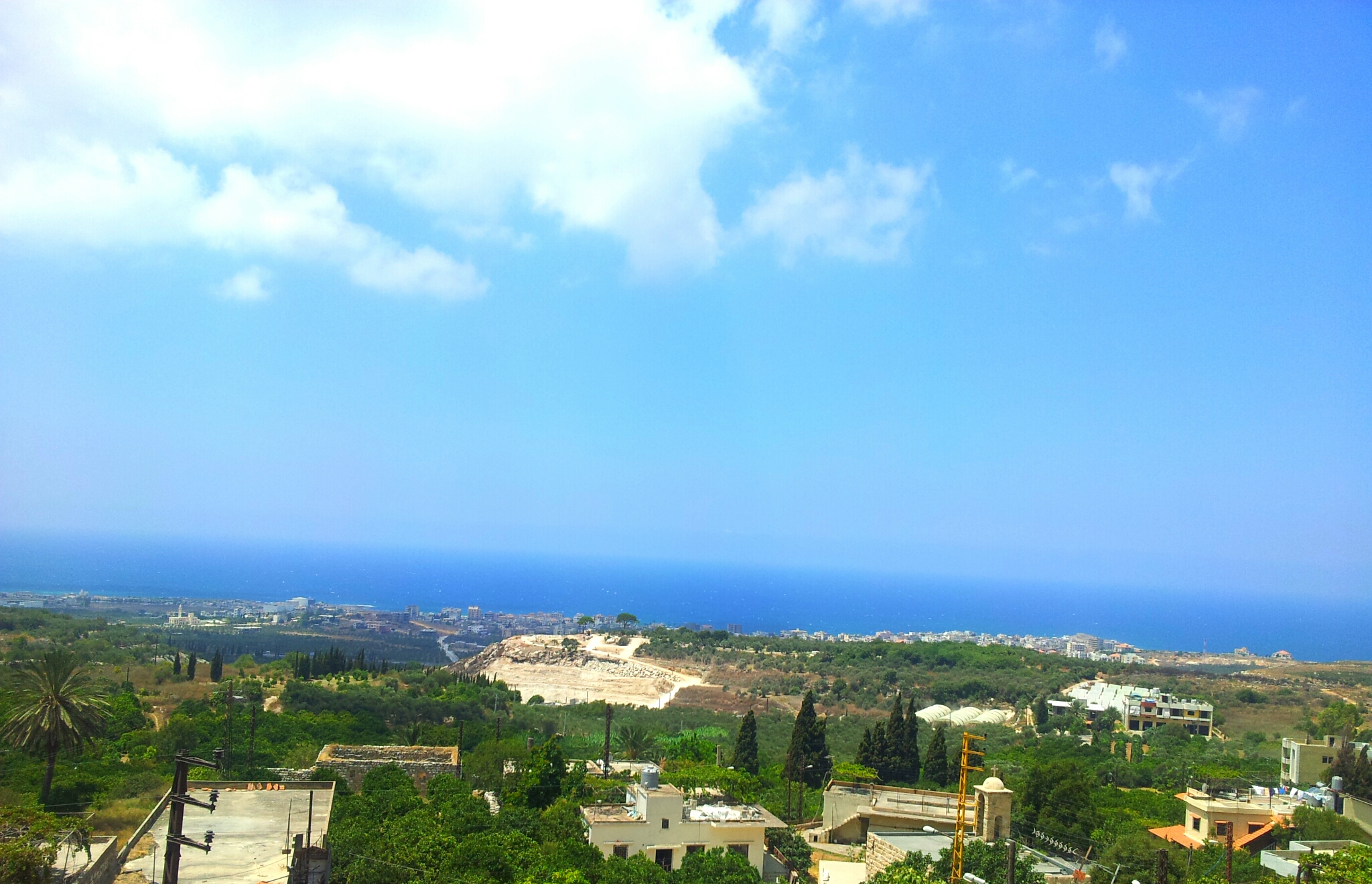

- Location within Lebanon
- Country: Lebanon
- Governorate: North
- District: Koura

Zakroun (Arabic: زكرون, romanized: Zakrūn) is a Maronite village in the Koura District of Lebanon. It is located between Enfeh and Fiaa, some 12 kilometres (7.5 mi) south of Tripoli. In 1953, Zakroun had a population of 85.

== Demographics ==
In 2014, Christians made up 97.68% of registered voters in Zakroun. 90.35% of the voters were Maronite Catholics.

== Economy ==
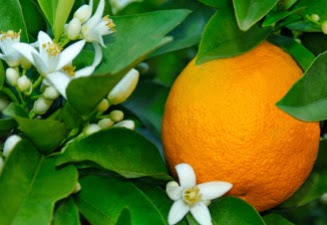
Orange flower used to produce orange flower water

As with most of the Koura District, olive tree cultivation and olive oil production is important. The village is also known for its orange trees, the flowers of which are picked in spring to produce orange flower water.
