= Anfeh =

Town in Koura District, Lebanon

Anfeh أنفة
- City
- Location within Lebanon
- Coordinates: 34°21′0″N 35°44′0″E
- Country: Lebanon
- Governorate: North Governorate
- District: Koura District
- Time zone: UTC+2 (EET)
  - Summer (DST): UTC+3 (EEST)
- Dialing code: +961

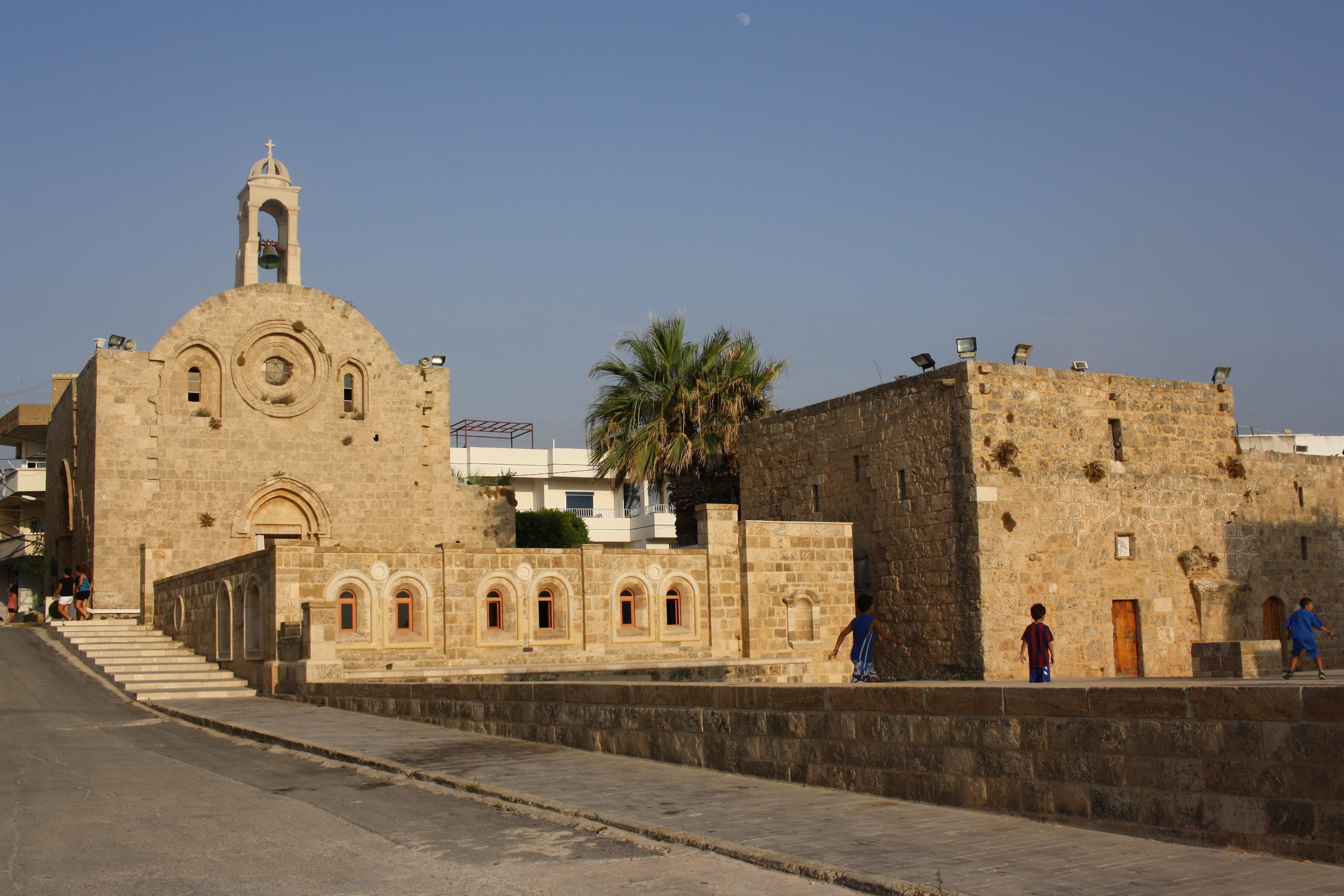
The Saint Catherine Church at Anfeh, North Lebanon

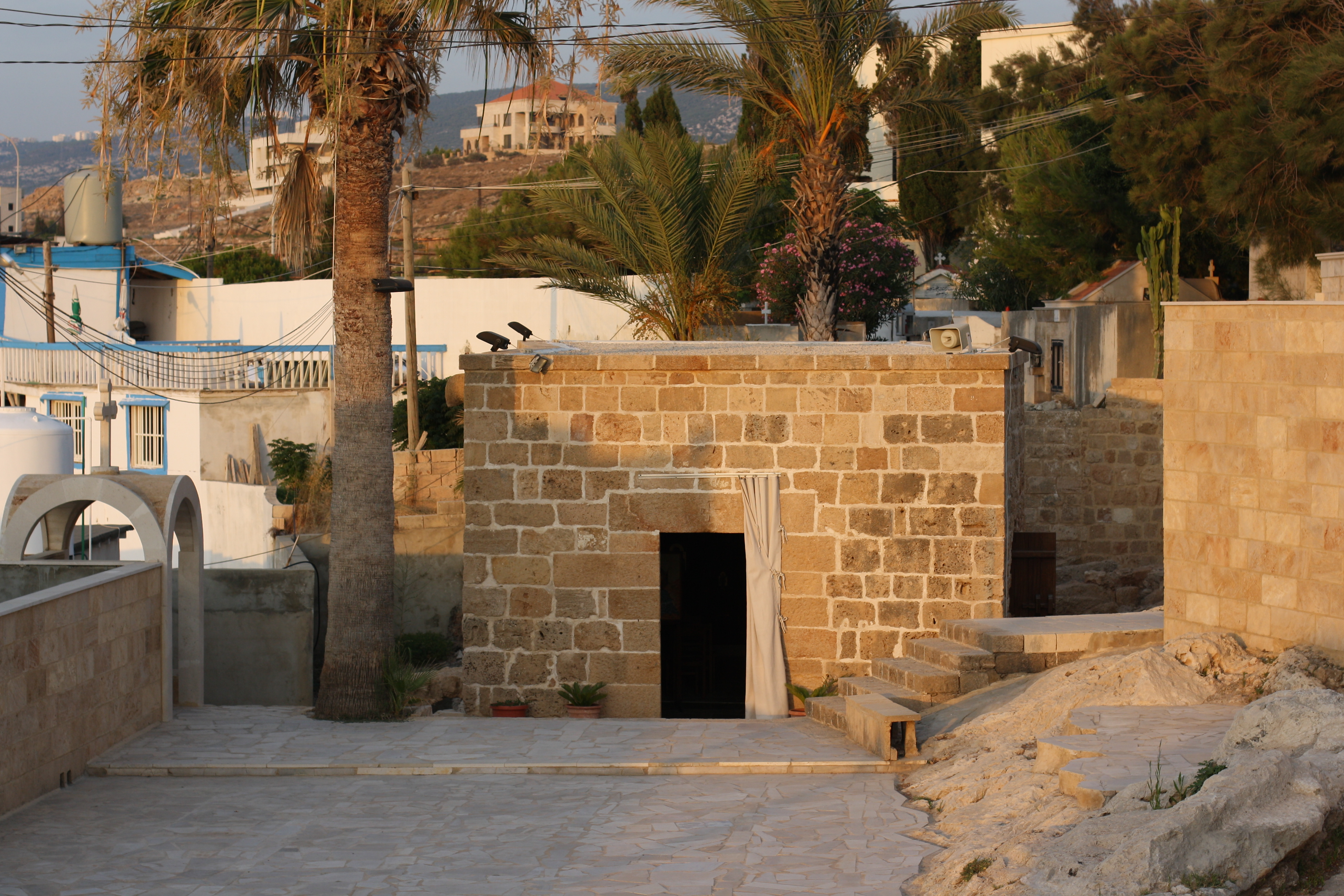
The old church "Notre-Dame des Vents" at Anfeh, North Lebanon

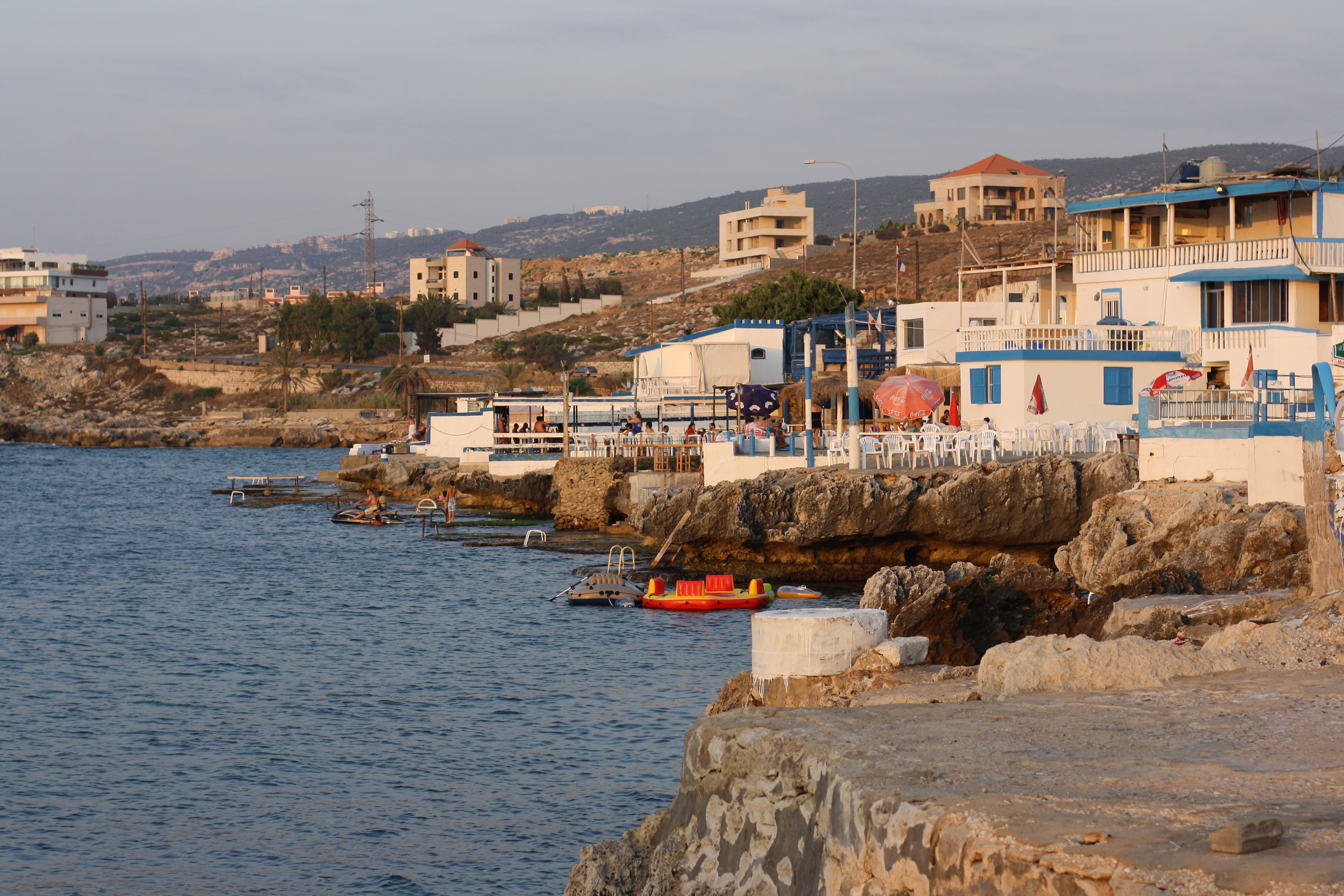
Vacation homes at Anfeh

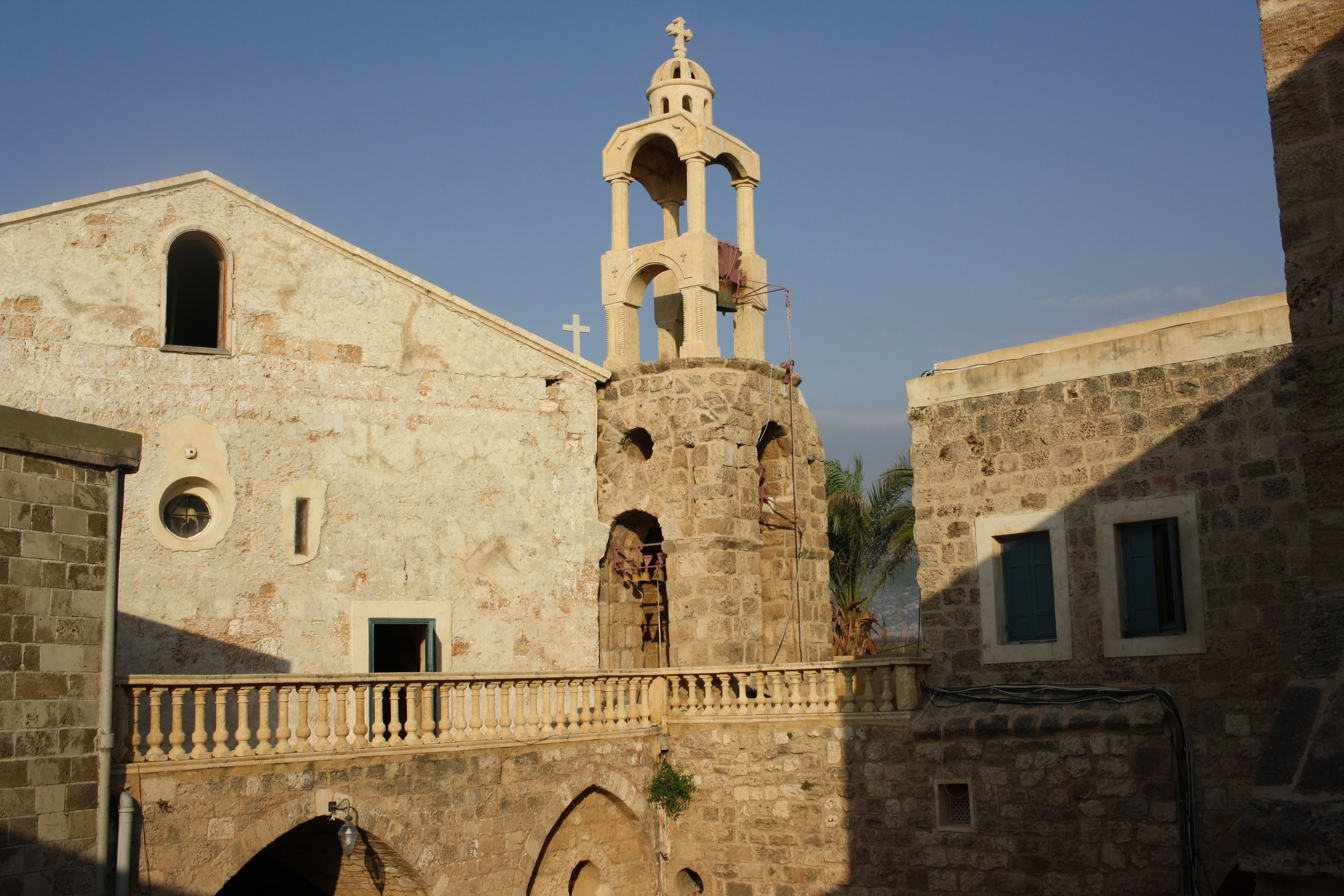
Deir El Natour at Anfeh

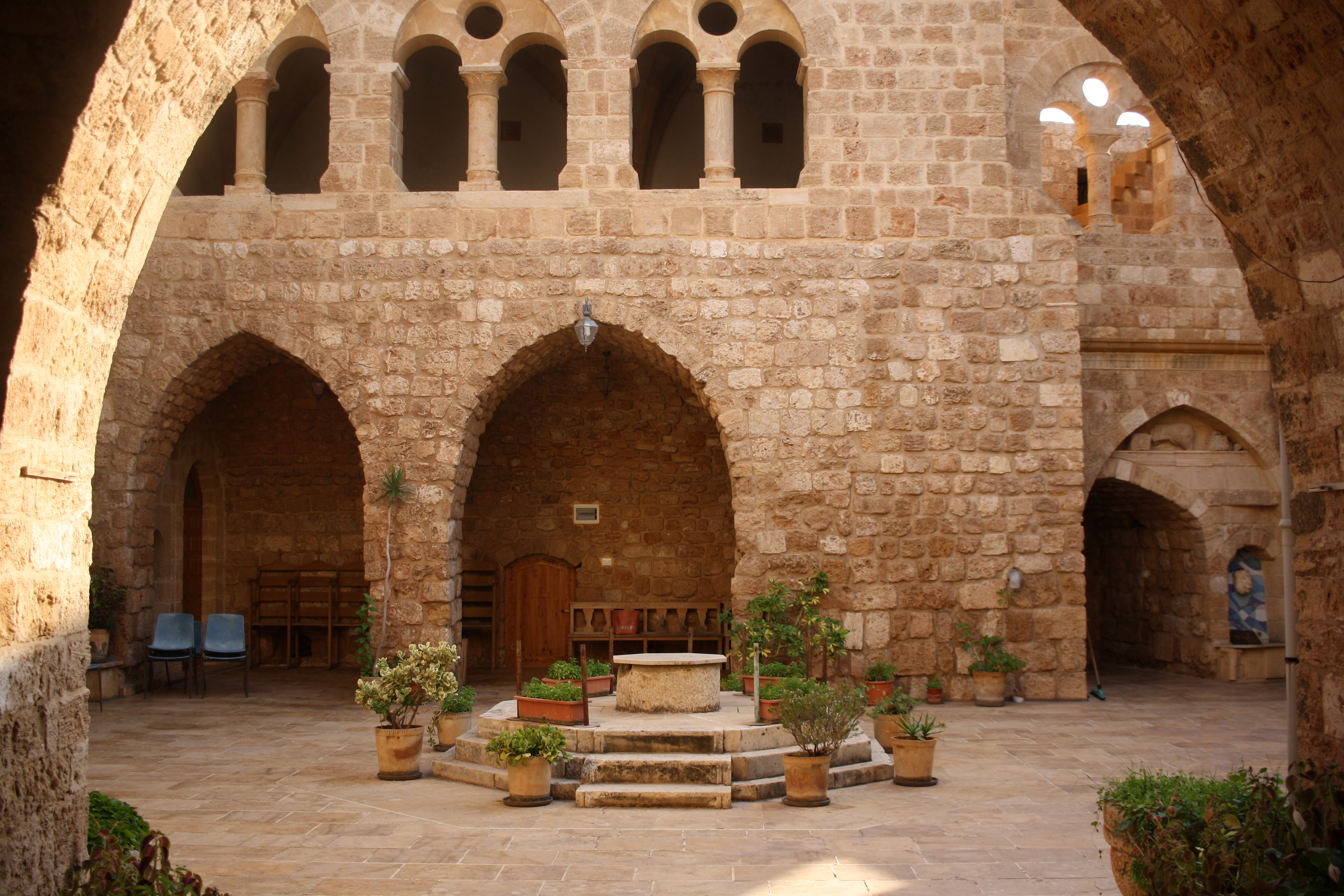
The Interior of Deir El Natour at Anfeh

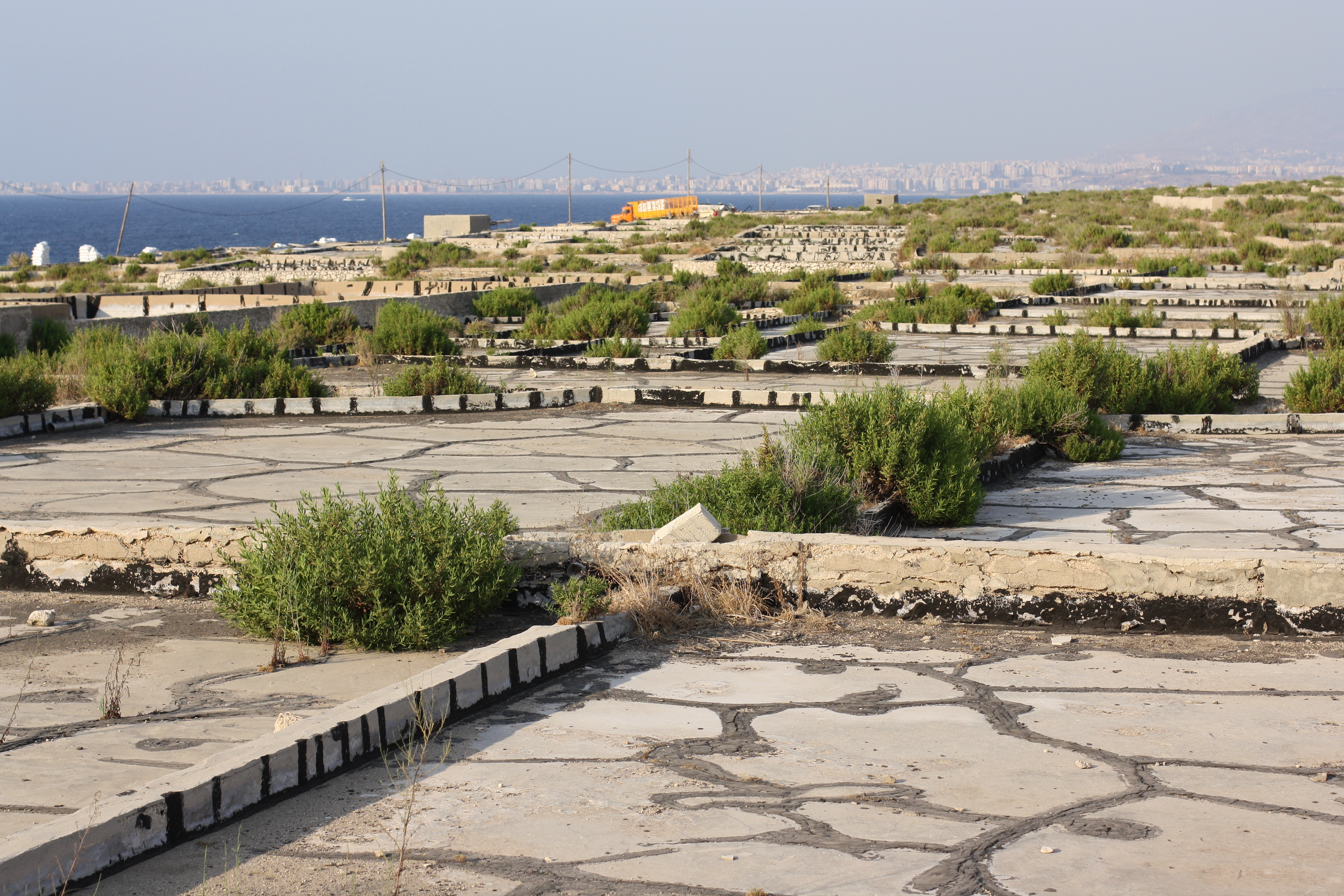
Old saltworks at Anfeh, near Tripoli (North Lebanon)

Anfeh (Arabic: أنفة), also spelled Enfe, Enfeh or Anfe, is a resort town in the Koura District of the North Governorate of Lebanon. Anfeh borders the towns of Chekka, Al-Qalamoun, Barghoun and Zakroun. It's located 65 kilometres (40 mi) north of Beirut and 15 kilometres (9.3 mi) south of Tripoli. Its total area is 4.93 square kilometres (1.90 sq mi), and its population is around 6,500.

The people are primarily Greek Orthodox with a minority of Maronite Christians and Sunni Muslim.

== History ==
Remains from at least 3,000 years of human occupation lie tangled among the myrtle and brambles of this 400 meter long and 120m wide peninsula. It is partially separated from the land by two great trenches-dug into the bedrock during the Phoenician period. While Anfeh has witnessed only minor excavation, Phoenician and Roman walls, wine presses, mosaic floors, and two seventh-century-A.D. chapels lie bare. This seaside fishing town is known for its ancient churches and caves. Today Anfeh is also known for its salt production. Close to Anfeh is the Crusader-era Abbey of Balamand, which sits on a promontory overlooking the sea

=== Ancient history ===
Today's village of Anfeh is built around the ruins of several short-lived cities going back to the pre-Phoenician period. Natural dwelling caves abound on the surrounding hill of Al-Gheer; the original city lies on a small near-island about half a kilometer into the sea. Its outstanding feature is that it is the only town throughout the eastern coast of the Mediterranean to be carved out of its rocky surroundings. Some of the carvings go all the way back to the Phoenician period, and possibly earlier, as witness to the fact that the name of Anfeh appears in the Tell-Amarna tablets of ancient Egypt; (see letter no. 2 by Yapa-Hadda). which were sent by the governors of the coastal Canaanite cities to the Pharaohs of Egypt asking for help in repelling Amorites intruders (nomad tribes originating from the middle Euphrates region in the North). Letters written by Rib Addi, the King of Byblos, specifically mention the Canaanite city of Anfeh (called “Ampi” in the letters) and state that Anfeh, after being occupied by the Amorites, fought with the Amorites against Byblos. Anfeh was conquered by the Assyrian army in the 7th century B.C., when it was known as "Anpa". The remains of subsequent settlements include dwelling caves, places of worship, cisterns, water tanks and wine presses, as well as steps and roads all carved in the rock. One ancient quarry, known as the Great Trench, was used by the Phoenicians as a dry dock; The Phoenicians used the place as a shipyard for the construction of their vessels, as it was a strategic point on the mediterranean coast.

=== The Crusades period ===
The Anfeh peninsula was once a mighty fortress area, including the Crusader castle of Nephin which was originally a Phoenician castle, and a fief of the Counts of Tripoli. The Crusader Lords of Nephin, who were protected behind the walls of Anfeh, the vast rock-cut moat which severed the peninsula from the town, and the sea-swept battlements of their citadel, soon established a reputation as robber barons, the terror of travellers between Jerusalem and Tripoli.

The town itself had a better reputation, for its wines were known and prized far and wide throughout the Latin kingdom in the 12th and 13th centuries. Anfeh entered its glory days during the Medieval era, and most of the archaeological and historical monuments that can be seen today date from this period. Around the 13th century, Anfeh was a small, fortified village surrounded by fertile fields, and it was famous for its wine production. It was one of the lordships of the county of Tripoli, governed by French provincial nobles from the Renoir family. The French Lord was eventually chased out of Anfeh by the Prince Bohemond IV of Antioch, the Lord of Beirut, and the Genoese, and he took refuge in Cyprus. Anfeh, as a cell or a hive sculptured out of the ground, is surrounded by walls and fortifications of enormous stones hauled from the nearby quarries.

In 1282, Anfeh was part of one of the greatest plots that marked the end of the Crusades. The Lord of Byblos, Guy II Embriaco, the Genoese, and the Knights Templar rose up against the Count of Tripoli Bohemond VII, but they were brutally crushed. Bohemond VII punished the Genoese by blinding them, and he buried alive the Lord of Byblos and his family in the Fort of Anfeh.

=== Fall of Tripoli ===
In 1289 Sultan Qalawun suddenly attacked, captured and destroyed Tripoli. The knights who escaped from the burning city to the two remaining coastal castles of Batroun and Nephin (Anfeh) were unable to withstand the full fury of the Mamluk army and beat a further retreat to the island kingdom of Cyprus. Sultan Qalawun destroyed both castles so thoroughly that even the site of Batroun's citadel is lost from history. With Nephin (Anfeh) it was a different story, for here the Crusaders had performed one of the great engineering feats of the Middle Ages. They had cut off the peninsular fortress from Anfeh proper by cutting a great moat, at sea level, all the way across the peninsula, for over 100 yards, through the living rock, leaving only a small spur in the center at the south end to support the castle's drawbridge.

== Old Churches ==
=== Our Lady of the Wind ===
Saydet El-Rih in Arabic, the oldest church of Anfeh, was built in the Byzantine era. It is believed that sailors and fishermen from the village of Anfeh built the chapel so that the Virgin Mary would protect them as they sailed the Mediterranean. It has a vaulted nave that ends with an apse oriented toward the east. On the west side, the nave is preceded by a square vaulted room that corresponds today to the entrance of the church. This room was once part of a rectangular hall, which was part of a nursing home that used to be connected to the church. Even though the roof of the chapel has long collapsed, it still retains traces of remaining frescos that are difficult to see. The old frescos depict Saints George and Demitrios, the baptism of the Christ, and the Christ in His Glory with some of the evangelists. The frescos on the south wall represent the Virgin Mary calming a storm.

=== Deir el-Natour ===
The Monastery of the Watchman, dating from the Crusades period, is attached to Balamand, the monastery of the Greek Orthodox patriarchate. Deir el-Natour has an interior cloister and the church has been decorated with paintings and frescos executed in Byzantine style by artists from Odessa. Lebanese diva Fayrouz chose Deir el-Natour in 2010, to perform her yearly chants of the holy Friday, in the scenery of the monastery's chapel and surrounding landscape.

=== Saint Catherine ===
Built during the Crusades, it is Lebanon's only remaining Romanesque church. The Church of Saint Catherine was originally dedicated to the Holy Sepulcher. The dedication was later changed to Saint Catherine during the 17th century, when the church was restored by local inhabitants. The church is built of sandstone. It has a rectangular vaulted nave with an apse at its east end. There are two main doors, one to the west and the other to the north. A small, vaulted chamber built in the southwest corner of the church can be accessed from the inside of the nave. Another room was built over this chamber and used to be accessed by a swinging ladder. On top of these rooms was the original bell tower. The new bell tower was built in the mid-20th century in a different architectural style. There is also a funerary cave near the church of Saint Catherine, which was transformed into an oratory. It was decorated with a circle inscribed with two Greek letters (Alpha and Omega) representing the Christ.

=== Saint Simeon and the Archangel Gabriel ===
Built next to the Church of Saint Catherine, this 18th-century church was dedicated to both Saint Simeon and the Archangel Gabriel. Architectural elements typical of the 18th century can be observed in the structure, such as the jars embedded in the ceiling to reduce noise and echo inside the church.

=== Saint George ===
It is the biggest and main church of the town. Its dome adds a form to the skyline of Anfeh.

=== Saint John the Baptist ===
Mar Youhanna al-Ma'madan in Arabic, is an ancient monastery surrounded by green landscapes and some curious rock cuttings. the site host the Saint John festivals every summer.

== Geography ==
=== Climate ===
Anfeh has a Mediterranean climate characterized by four notably different seasons with a moderate nice weather during spring time. Summers are mainly hot, while winters are cold and rainy.

The table below displays average monthly climate indicators in Anfeh based on 8 years of historical weather readings.

Climate data for Anfeh, Lebanon
Month	Jan	Feb	Mar	Apr	May	Jun	Jul	Aug	Sep	Oct	Nov	Dec	Year
Mean daily maximum °C (°F)	16 (61)	17 (63)	18 (64)	21 (70)	25 (77)	28 (82)	30 (86)	30 (86)	29 (84)	26 (79)	22 (72)	18 (64)	23 (73)
Mean daily minimum °C (°F)	8 (46)	7 (45)	10 (50)	12 (54)	16 (61)	19 (66)	22 (72)	22 (72)	21 (70)	17 (63)	12 (54)	10 (50)	15 (59)
Average precipitation days	6	4	4	2	0	0	0	0	0	2	2	4	24
Source: climate-zone.com/

== Demographics ==
In 1953, the town had a population of 1,447. Its population is estimated to be around 6,500, not including the thousands of emigrant families and young individuals.

=== Global Emigration ===
One of the many Lebanese villages where the number of inhabitants is a speck compared to the number of villagers abroad. Global emigration occurred as far back as the mid 19th century with records showing young men and families migrating to the new world mainly Australia and the Americas (North and South). The emigration continues till the present day. Some families are extinct and others are greatly reduced in number. However, in the diaspora, if one visits any major city or town specially in Brazil, Argentina, Qatar, Australia, Canada or the USA one will almost certainly find someone whose ancestors come from this village. During holidays specially summer many of the empty houses are joyfully cleaned and return to life with visiting families.

=== Religion ===
In 2014 Christians made up 97.54% of registered voters in Anfeh. 89.60% of the voters were Antiochian Orthodox. There are several historical churches and local shrines throughout the village.

=== Notable people ===
- Farid Makari: Lebanese politician since 1980, He was elected as a member of the Lebanese Parliament in 1992 and reelected in 1996, 2000, 2005 and 2009, he served as information minister in Hariri's second cabinet from 25 May 1995 to 7 November 1996, Former Vice-President of Lebanese Parliament since 2005.

== Economy ==
=== Salines ===
Wide areas of Anfeh and its surrounding are covered by salines. Along the length of the bay, the salt marshes add a typically pretty note to the landscape, especially with the traditional wind wheel which pumps seawater. The production of sea salt is a staple of the local economy. "White gold", as it is called, provides for an inexhaustible natural resource which can thus be extracted without endangering the environment.

=== Fishing ===
Around 415 inhabitants practice fishing on a regular basis. The 80 full-time fishermen own their boats and maintain them. Fishing is the livelihood and main source of income for many families in Anfeh. Fishing boats have sought shelter in the natural harbor of Nhayreh in bad weather conditions. The large terraces on Anfeh's rocky coast shelter underwater species feeding on the seaweed and attract large numbers of fish. That place also attracts many anglers willing to fill their baskets with different types of fish. Fishing, by itself, is an art in Anfeh, inherited by its ancestors.

=== Agriculture ===
Fruits consist mainly of: Olive trees producing quality table olives and olive oil, and Grapes (seedless and non seedless).

== Tourism ==
Anfeh attracts tourists, especially during summer time, for its landscape of small white houses, windmills and salines on its rocky beaches along the Mediterranean coast. Its historical monuments, old churches, and archaeological site of its peninsula make it one of the top touristic destinations of the Lebanese northern coast.

Anfeh is equipped to receive tourists, offering a choice of activities and touristic resorts such as Marina Del Sol and Las Salinas. Tourists can also eat fresh fish by the sea at local restaurants that offer fresh daily picks.

== Education ==
Anfeh is equipped with one public school (Gebran Makari School). Private schools are available in the surrounding region of el-Koura, and in the nearby city of Tripoli. The three top universities of northern Lebanon, are around 5 to 10 minutes by car, like Balamand University, NDU in Barsa, and USJ in Al-Qalamoun.

== Sports ==
=== Camping Hiking and swimming ===
Lying between the natural harbor of Nhayreh and the archaeological peninsula, the Anfeh creek consists of a rocky shore shaped as a semi-circle at whose bottom lie numerous sandy underwater caves. It has become a path for hikers and swimmers who are drawn to its and water.

Many swimmers enjoy the sea of Anfeh, others prefer the Olympic swimming pools that are available for practicing outdoor in summer and indoor in winter.

During the war, Lebanese national swimming championships were mostly held in Las Salinas and marina del sol in Anfeh.

=== Diving ===
Anfeh is known for its clear water, one of the cleanest waters on the Lebanese coast, home to a wide variety of fish. the archaeological peninsula hides many secrets in its bottoms below sea level, attracting curious divers.

=== Surfing ===
The waves of Anfeh's sea are not big enough for surfing, and its rocky shore does not help much. although its mostly windy weather during summer, makes it a top destination for wind surfing. equipment rental are available in town. Recently the wind of Anfeh is attracting the new small kite surfing community of Lebanon.

== Arts And Culture ==
=== Cinema ===
Anfeh's mediterranean landscape has attracted the cameras of various film directors. The town has been the set of several local movies. The town has the number one cinema theatres in the north, Grand cinemas las salinas.

== Transportation ==
=== Roads ===
Easily accessible from the main Beirut-Tripoli highway, taking the Anfeh exit. It is also reachable by taking the Chekka exit and heading north, or the Balamand exit and heading south. The roads are satisfactory and well maintained by the municipality. The road through town is the old main road that connects Beirut to Tripoli, now called the seaside road, parallel to the old train railway.

== Threats to Anfeh's Archaeology ==
The ancient archaeological site was put in danger by a proposed expansion to the adjacent port that would have compromised its historical integrity. Even after the project was sidelined, development pressures from nearby communities continue to threaten the long-term preservation of the site.

== See also ==
- List of Crusader castles
