= Kelhat =

Village in Koura District, Lebanon

Kelhat قلحات
- Village
- Location within Lebanon
- Coordinates: 34°21′22″N 35°46′52″E
- Country: Lebanon
- Governorate: North
- District: Koura
- Elevation: 400 m (1,300 ft)

Kelhat (Arabic: قلحات, romanized: Qelḥāt), also spelled Kalhat, Qalhat, or Qelhat, is a Greek Orthodox village in the Koura District of Lebanon. It extends from the shores of the Mediterranean Sea to an elevation of around 400m above sea level.

== Demographics ==
In 2014, Christians made up 98.50% of registered voters in Kelhat. 88.67% of the voters were Greek Orthodox.

== Educational centers ==
Kelhat contains many educational institutes, covering the Lebanese Educational System from Primary Education to Higher Education, namely, University of Balamand, College Notre Dame du Balamand and Lady of Balamand High School.

== Prayer sites ==
Four Greek Orthodox Churches exist in Kelhat, The Church of Saint George and most notably the Balamand Monastery.

== Main families ==
Some family names are: Issa (عيسى), Hanna (حنا), Nasr (نصر), Nasrallah (نصرالله), Wehbé (وهبة), Malek (مالك), Sleiman (سليمان), Jabbour (جبور), Bahri (البحري), Jedd (الجد), Nicolas (نقولا), Melais (المليس), Aoun (عون), Murr (مر), Nader (نادر), Khoury (خوري), Saba (سابا), Nehme (نعمة), Moussa (موسى), Chamoun (شمعون), Elias (الياس).
