= Zakzouk =

Maronite village in Koura District, Lebanon

Zakzouk زكزوك
- Village
- Country: Lebanon
- Governorate: North
- District: Koura

Zakzouk (Arabic: زكزوك, romanized: Zakzūk) is a Maronite village in Koura District of Lebanon.
