= Rachedbine =

Maronite village in Koura District, Lebanon

Coordinates: 34.2936°N 35.8657°E

Rachedbine رشدبين
- Village
- Location within Lebanon
- Country: Lebanon
- Governorate: North
- District: Koura

Rachedbine (Arabic: رشدبين, romanized: Rashedbīn), also spelled Rechdibbine, is a Maronite village in the Koura District, in the North Governorate of Lebanon.

== Demographics ==
In 2014, Christians made up 99.76% of registered voters in Rachedbine. 93.65% of the voters were Maronite Catholics.
