= Wata Fares =

Village in Koura District, Lebanon

Wata Fares وطى فارس
- Village
- Country: Lebanon
- Governorate: North
- District: Koura

Wata Fares, Ouata Fares, (Arabic: وطى فارس) is a village in Koura District of Lebanon. It has a mixed Maronite and Eastern Orthodox population.)
