= Ras Maska =

Village in North Governorate of Lebanon

Ras Maska رَأْسُ مَسْقَا
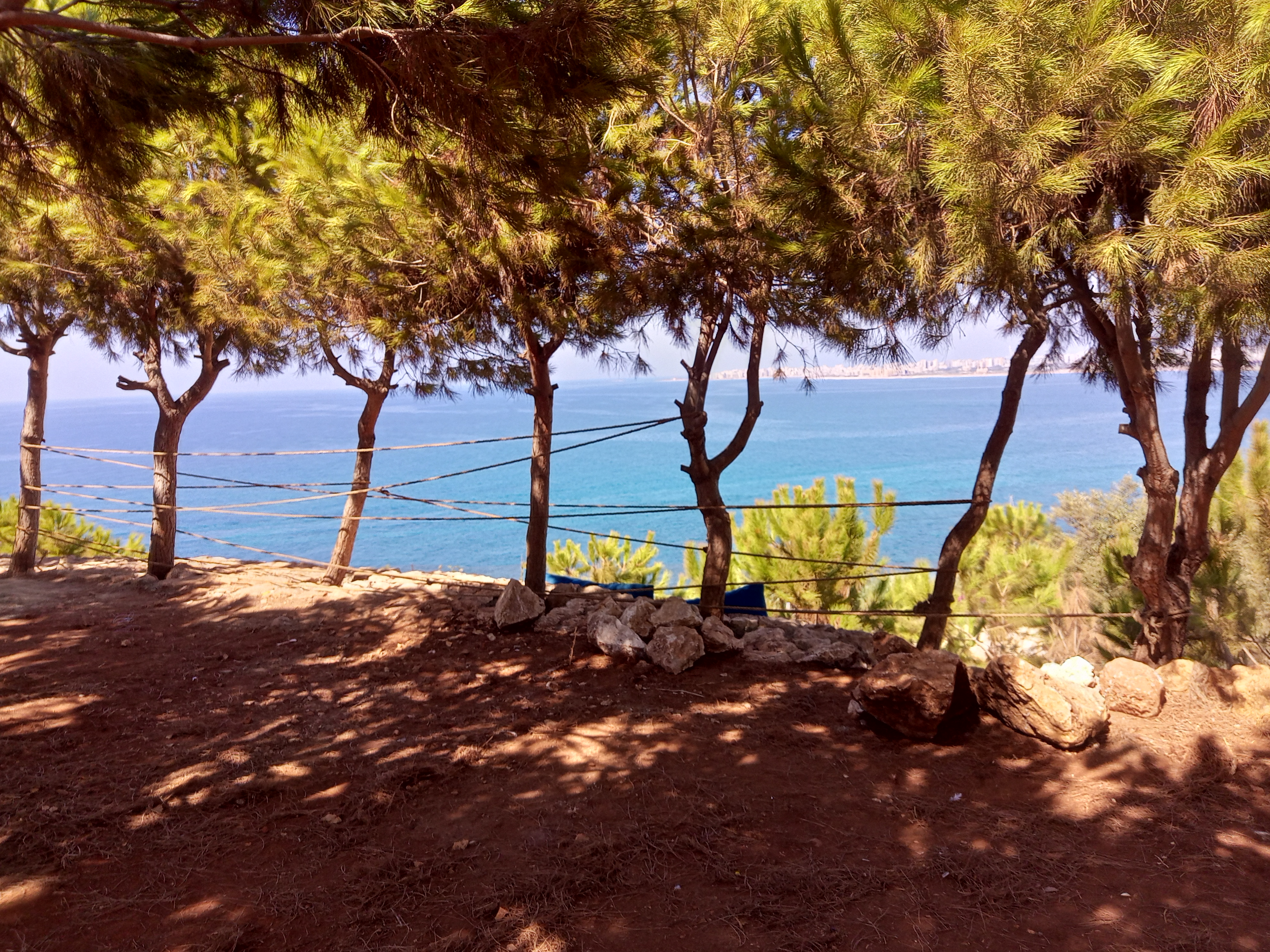
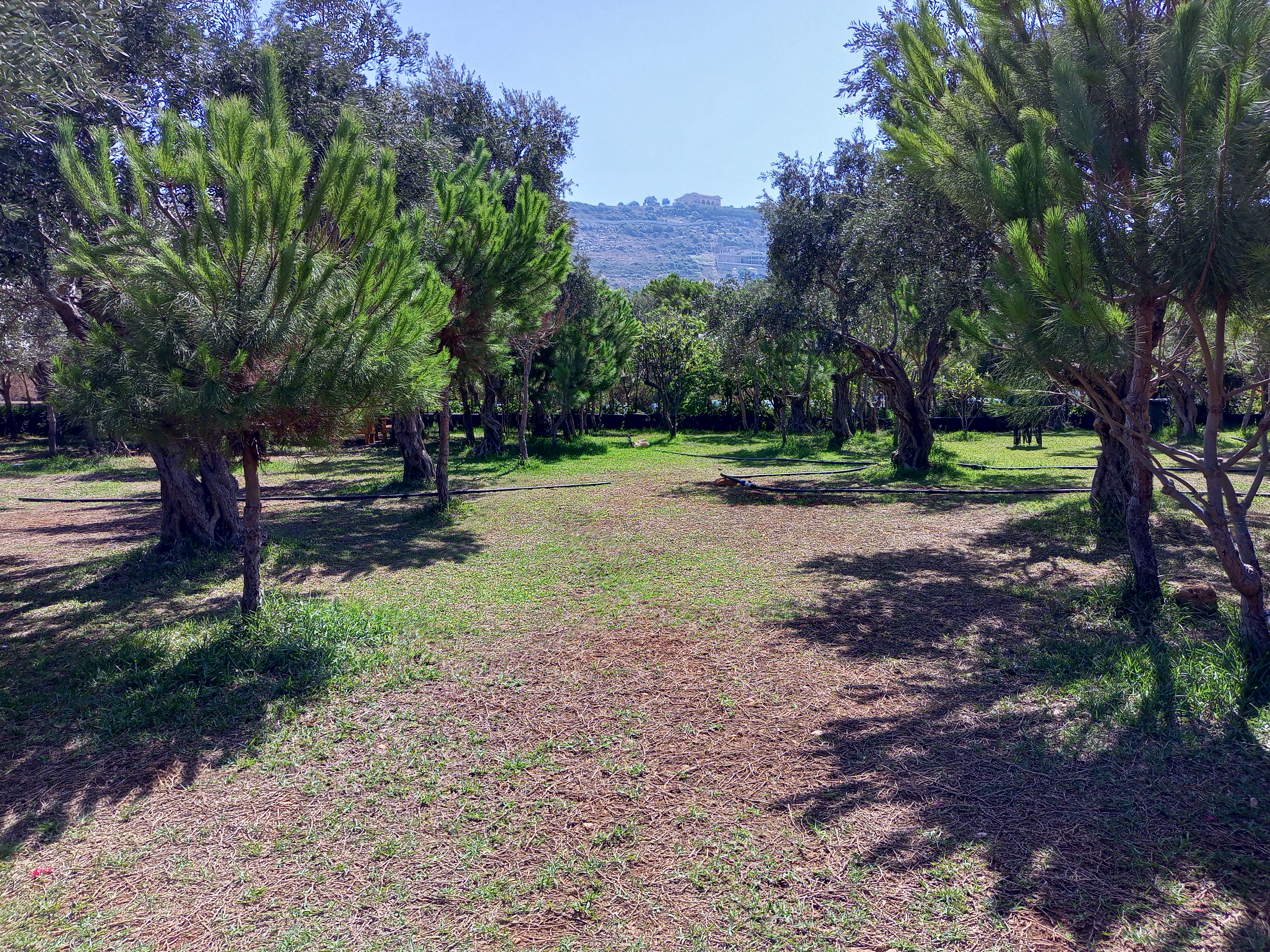
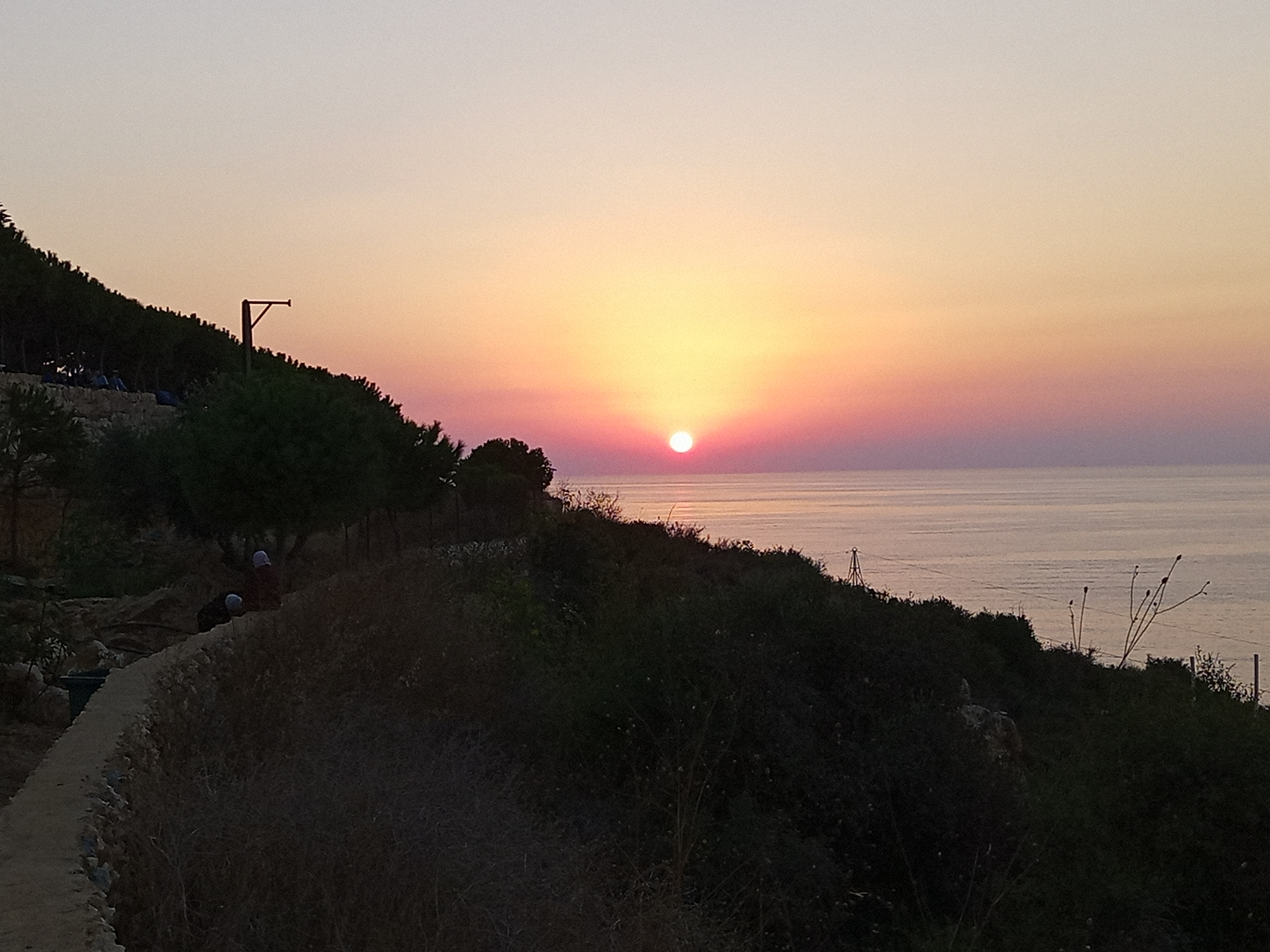
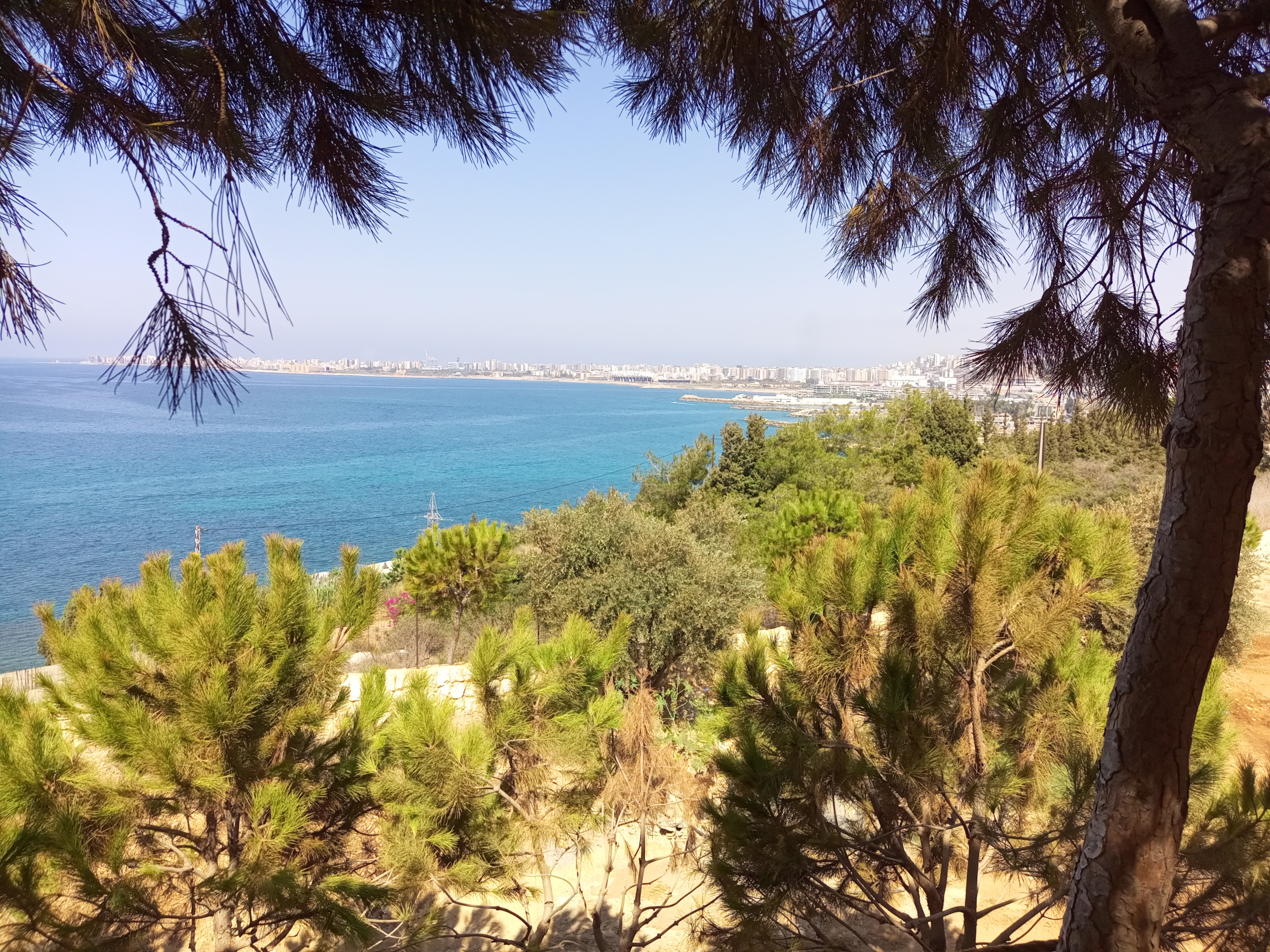
- City

- Location within Lebanon
- Coordinates: 34°23′0″N 35°50′0″E
- Country: Lebanon
- Governorate: North Governorate
- District: Koura District

Government
- Elevation: 150 m (490 ft)

Population
  - Total: 20,000
- Time zone: UTC+2 (EET)
  - Summer (DST): UTC+3 (EEST)
- Dialing code: +961

Ras Maska (Lebanese Arabic: Rāṣ Masʾa, written as "رَأْسُ مَسْقَا", Classical Arabic: رَأْسُ مَسْقًى, romanized: Raʾs Masqa, lit. 'Head/Top of a watering source', Syriac: ܪܺܫܳܐ ܡܰܣܩܳܐ) is a village located in the Koura District, in the North Governorate of Lebanon.

== Etymology and names ==
The name of the village is probably derived from the Aramaic language, "ras" meaning "top" and "maska" meaning "drinking stream". The equivalent meaning could be "top of the stream". Due to the geography of the village, this translation is more likely correct than the equivalent Arabic translation: "top of irrigation".

== Geography ==
This village is located in the Koura district on the hills overlooking the Mediterranean to the south of Tripoli. It is divided between the northern and southern regions.

Northern Ras Maska or Ras Masqa El Chmeliyeh (Arabic: رأس مسقى الشمالية), is the lowest part of the village, located at 60 meters (200 ft) above sea level. The religious majority of the northern population is Sunni Muslim. It hosts many coastal beach resorts. Northern Ras Maska is known for its olive agriculture.

Southern Ras Maska or Ras Masqa El Jnoubiyeh (Arabic: رأس مسقى الجنوبية), is the highest part of the village, located at 200 meters (660 ft) above sea level. The religious majority is Christian, including Greek Orthodox and Maronites.

== Demographics ==
=== Northern Ras Maska ===
In 2014, Muslims made up 98.56% or registered voters in Northern Ras Maska. 87.93% of the voters were Sunni Muslims.

=== Southern Ras Maska ===
In 2014, Christians made up 98.58% of registered voters in Southern Ras Maska. 53.99% of the voters were Greek Orthodox and 37.76% were Maronite Catholics.

== History ==
Ras Maska first appears in the Ottoman census of 1519. It belonged to the Nahiyat Koura / Anfeh and was inhabited by 14 male adults (more than 15 years old), 80% of them being married. If we adopt the estimation of the Historians), the number of inhabitants of Ras Maska in 1519 would have been of 70 persons.

In the Ottoman census of 1571, the number of male adults was 26. The population of Ras Maska practically doubled over the period, growing on average by 12 per mil per year to be compared to a growth of the number of inhabitants in the Nahiyat of 6.7% per mil per year.

In 1953, Ras Maska had a population of 251 living in 40 households.

== Landmarks ==
- Lebanese University - North Lebanon Campus
- Centre universitaire du Liban-Nord - Université Saint-Joseph
- HARIRI Canadian University - North Campus
- Hospital Albert Haykel
- Ras Maska Volley-Ball Club
- Ras Maska Rd. Today and Rd. Tomorrow
- Ras Maska Steel Bridge
- Ras Maska Red Bridge
- Ras Maska Square
- Tripoli Beton
- Perla
