= Chira, Lebanon =

Maronite village in Koura District, Lebanon

Chira شيرا
- Village
- Location within Lebanon
- Country: Lebanon
- Governorate: North Governorate
- District: Koura District Bsharri District
- Elevation: 718 m (2,356 ft)
- Time zone: UTC+2 (EET)
  - Summer (DST): UTC+3 (EEST)

Chîra (Arabic: شيرا, romanized: Shīrā) is a Maronite village between the Bsharri District and the Koura District of Lebanon.
