= Charlita =

Eastern Orthodox village in the Koura District of Lebanon

Charlita شارليتا
- Village
- Country: Lebanon
- Governorate: North
- District: Koura

Charlita (Arabic: شارليتا), is an Eastern Orthodox village in Koura District of Lebanon.
