= Koura District =

Coordinates: 34.2992°N 35.814°E

- District
- الكورة
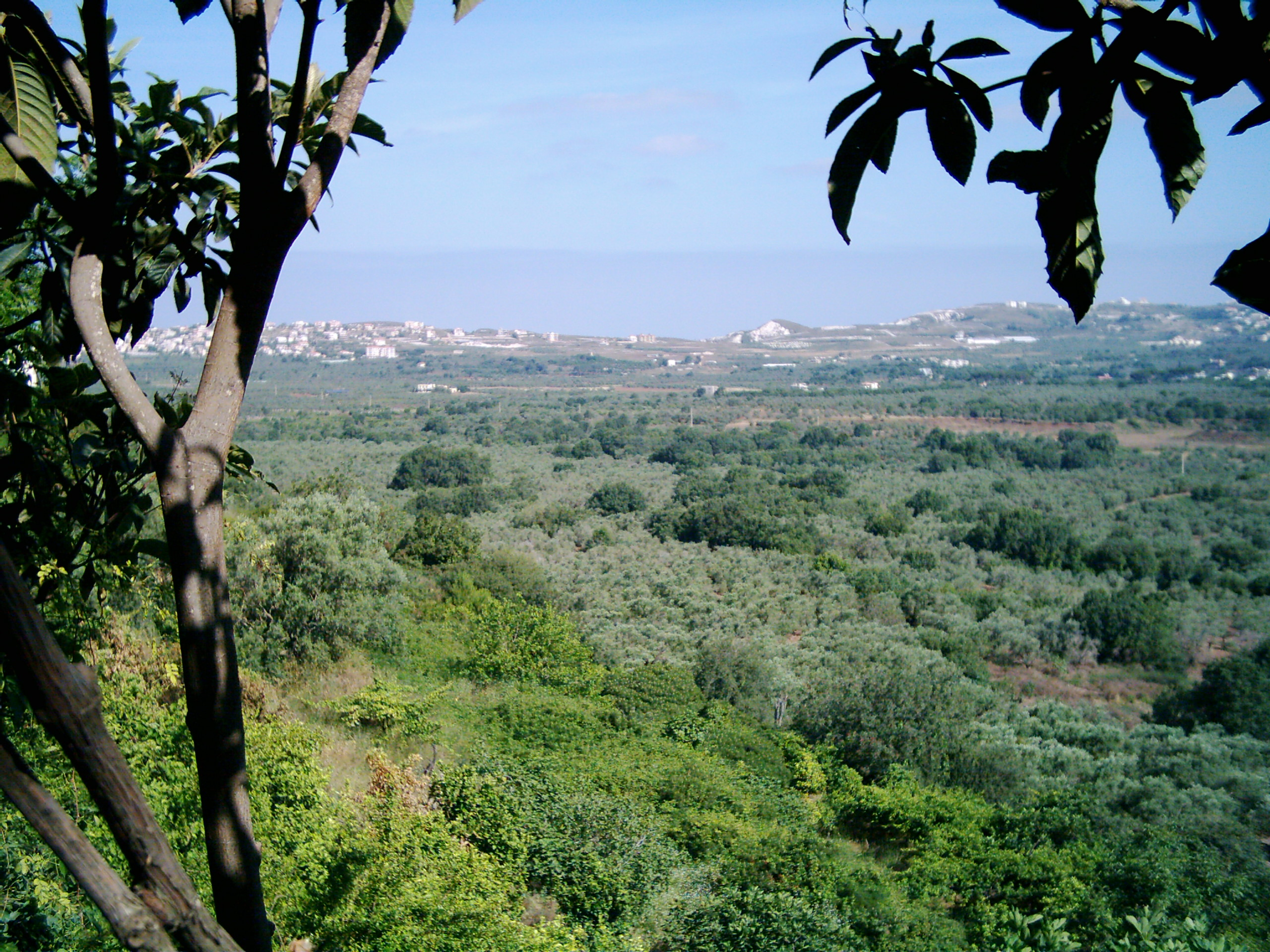
- Plains of Koura

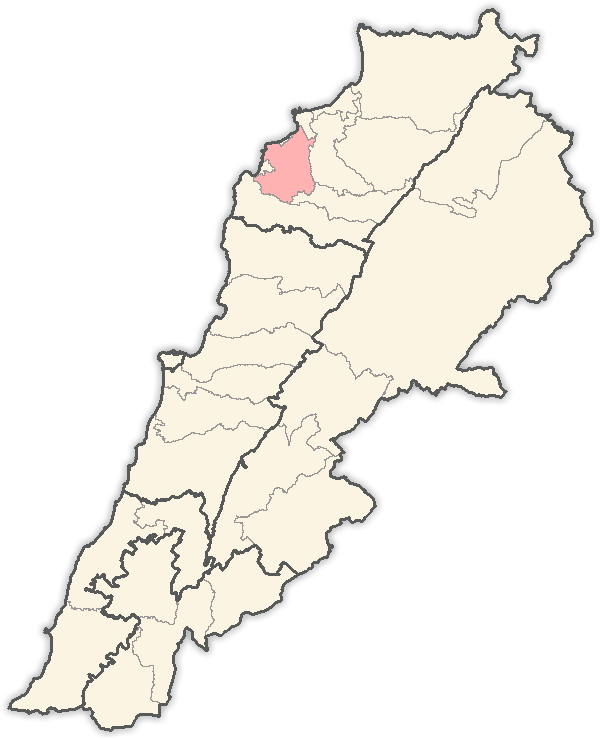
- Location in Lebanon
- Country: Lebanon
- Governorate: North Governorate
- Capital: Amioun

Area
  - Total: 67 sq mi (173 km^{2})

Population
  - Estimate (31 December 2017): 75,056
- Time zone: UTC+2 (EET)
  - Summer (DST): UTC+3 (EEST)

Koura District (Arabic: ٱلْكُورَة, from Greek: χώρα, lit. 'country') is a district in the North Governorate, Lebanon.

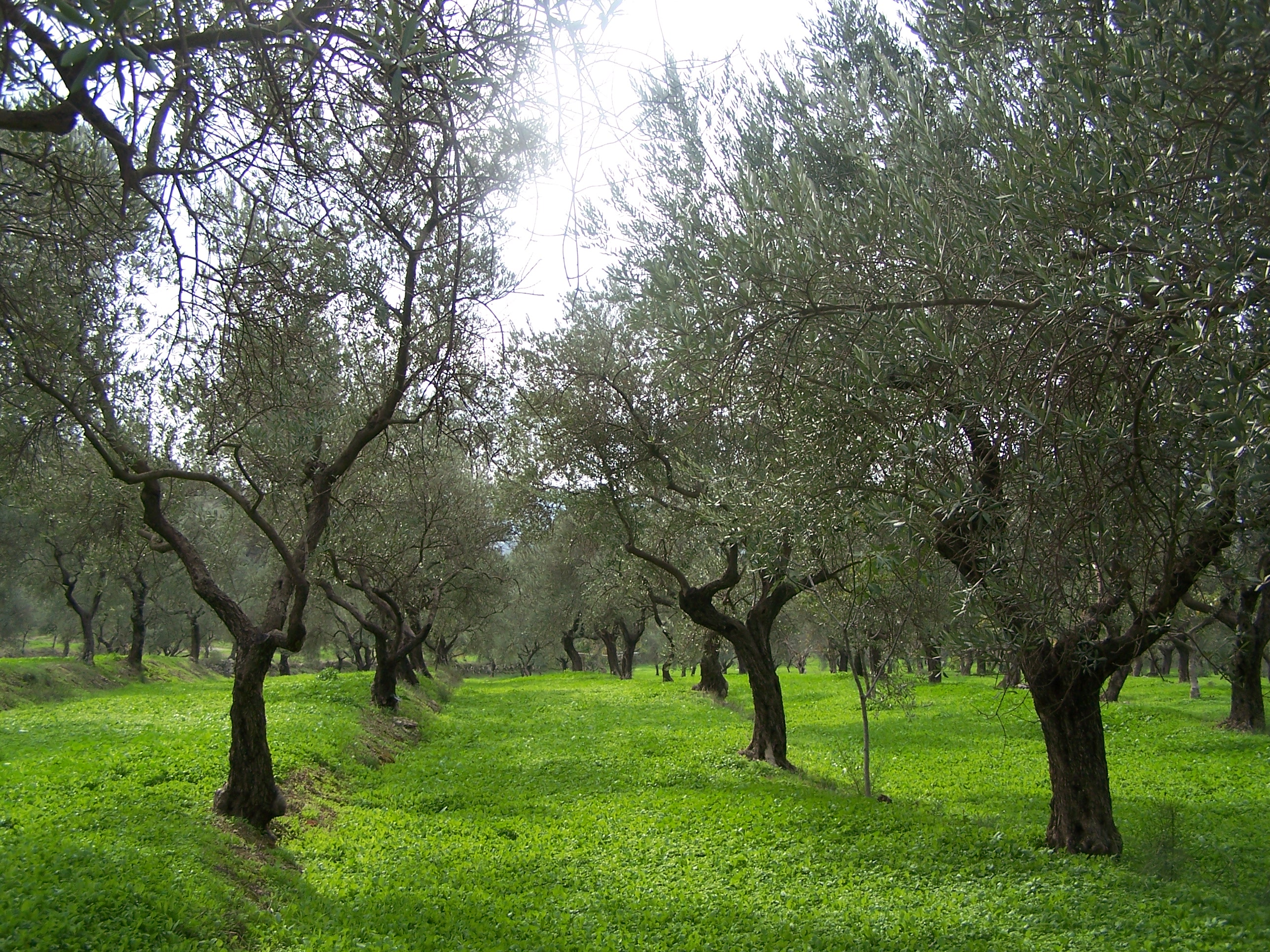
Olive trees in the Koura District

Koura is one of the 26 districts of Lebanon, particularly known for its olive tree cultivation and olive oil production. It comprises a total of 52 villages, and its capital and largest town is Amioun, with about 10,000 inhabitants as of 2010. The district stretches from the Mediterranean Sea up to Mount Lebanon, and comprises a series of foothills surrounding a low-lying plain where olive is cultivated. The olive orchards of Koura are among the most extensive in Lebanon.

The University of Balamand is headquartered in the Koura District.

== Demographics ==
According to registered voters in 2014:

Year	Christians					Muslims				Druze
Year	Total	Greek Orthodox	Maronites	Greek Catholics	Other Christians	Total	Sunnis	Shias	Alawites	Druze
2014	83.01%	59.31%	21.43%	1.18%	1.09%	16.55%	13.82%	1.97%	0.76%	0.02%
2018	82.87%	58.64%	21.56%	1.18%	1.49%	17.1%	14.32%	1.99%	0.79%	0.02%
2022	82.90%	57.63%	21.57%	2.80%	0.90%	17.08%	14.46%	1.87%	0.75%	0.00%
2026	81.24%	61.83%	18.85%	—N/a	0.56%	18.76%	15.72%	2.07%	0.97%	0.00%

Number of registered voters (21+ years old) over the years.

Years	Men	Women	Total	Growth (%)
2009	29,286	28,509	57,795	—N/a
2010	29,558 ▲	28,696 ▲	58,254 ▲	+0.79% ▲
2011	28,642 ▼	28,527 ▼	57,169 ▼	-1.90% ▼
2012	28,811 ▲	28,726 ▲	57,537 ▲	+0.64% ▲
2013	29,267 ▲	29,066 ▲	58,333 ▲	+1.36% ▲
2014	29,486 ▲	29,288 ▲	58,774 ▲	+0.75% ▼
2015	29,729 ▲	29,452 ▲	59,181 ▲	+0.69% ▼
2016	29,919 ▲	29,678 ▲	59,597 ▲	+0.70% ▲
2017	30,234 ▲	29,935 ▲	60,169 ▲	+0.95% ▲
2018	30,672 ▲	30,309 ▲	60,981 ▲	+1.33% ▲
2019	30,989 ▲	30,577 ▲	61,566 ▲	+0.95% ▲
2020	31,263 ▲	30,759 ▲	62,022 ▲	+0.74% ▼
2021	31,432 ▲	30,828 ▲	62,260 ▲	+0.38% ▼
2022	31,673 ▲	30,994 ▲	62,667 ▲	+0.65% ▲
2023	31,757 ▲	31,017 ▲	62,774 ▲	+0.17% ▼
2024	31,923 ▲	31,155 ▲	63,078 ▲	+0.48% ▲
2025	32,009 ▲	31,207 ▲	63,216 ▲	+0.22% ▼
2026	—N/a	—N/a	63,454 ▲	+0.38% ▲
Source: DGCS

== Cities and towns ==
Major Cities
Kfaraakka	Amioun	Enfeh	Deddeh	Kousba	Ras Maska

Cities and Towns
1. Aaba	2. Afsdik	3. Ain Akrine	4. Ali-al-Mouran
5. Amioun	6. Enfeh	7. Badebhoun	8. Barghoun
9. Barsa	10. Bdebba	11. Batroumine	12. Bishmizzine
13. Bhabouch	14. Bishriyata	15. Bkomra	16. Bneyel
18. Btourram	19. Btouratige	20. Bkeftine	21. Bnehran
22. Bsarma	23. Btaaboura	24. Bziza	25. Charlita
26. Chira	27. Dahr-al-Ain	28. Darbechtar	29. Darchmezzine
30. Deddeh	31. Fih	32. Ijdebrine	33. Kaftoun
34. Kifraya	35. Kelbata	36. Kelhat	37. Kfaraakka
38. Kfarhata	39. Kfarhazir	40. Kaferkahel	41. Kfarsaroun
42. Kousba	43. Maziriit Toula	44. Mitrit	45. Mijdel
46. Nakhleh	47. Rachedbine	48. Ras Maska	49. Wata Fares
50. Zakroun	51. Zakzouk	52. Dhour Alhawa	

== See also ==
- University of Balamand
