= Kaferkahel =

Village in Koura District, Lebanon

Coordinates: 34.3571°N 35.8524°E

Kaferkahel كفرقاهل
- Village
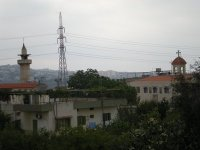
- Kaferkahel's Mosque (left) and Church (right)
- Interactive map of Kaferkahel
- Country: Lebanon
- Governorate: North Governorate
- District: El-Koura

Area
  - Total: 67 sq mi (173 km^{2})

Population
  - Total: Doesn't exceed 500
- Time zone: UTC+2 (EET)
  - Summer (DST): UTC+3 (EEST)

Kaferkahel (Arabic: كفرقاحل, romanized: Kfarqāḥel), also spelled Kfarkahel, Kfarqahel, Kfar Kahel or Kfar Qahel, is a Lebanese village in the Koura District of the North governorate. Characterized by its geographical location as it separates the district of Al-Koura and Zgharta-corner through the Kadisha Valley and the Kadisha River. The village is majority Sunni Muslim. A church and a mosque are situated in the center of the village. There is also a little abandoned church dedicated to St. Elias (Arabic: مار الياس) on the banks of the Kadisha River, where celebrations for Mar Illiess take place in July.

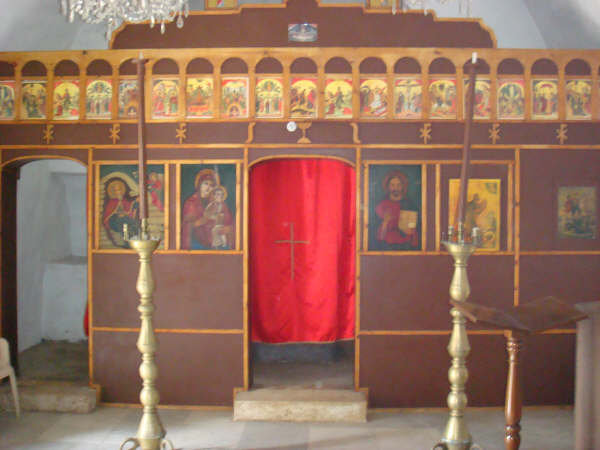
The "Mar Illiess" Church

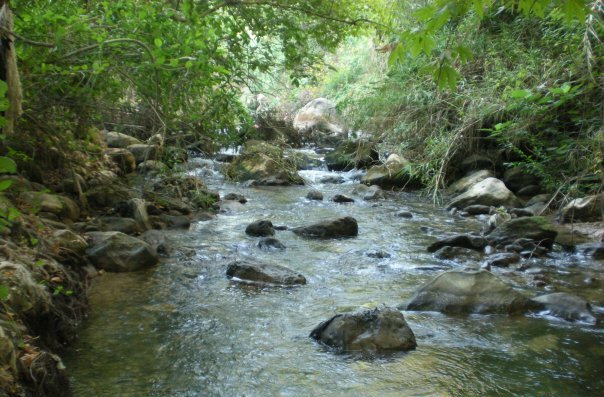
Kadisha River

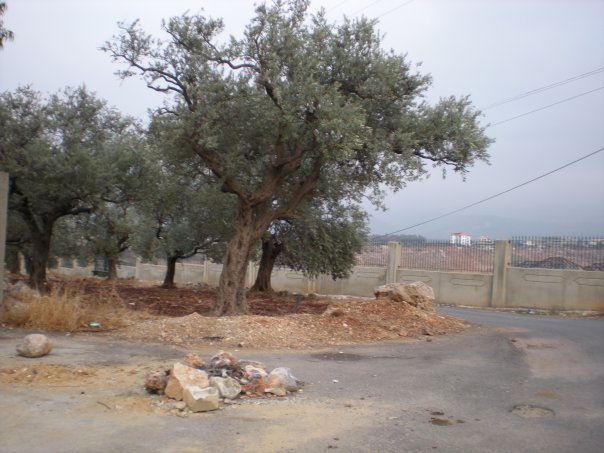
Olive tree in Kaferkahel

== Demographics ==
=== Faith ===
In 2014, Muslims made up 61.22% and Christians made up 38.52% of registered voters in Kaferkahel. 59.82% of the voters were Sunni Muslims and 36.35% were Greek Orthodox.

=== Diaspora ===
There are a lot of immigrants from Kaferkahel to several countries like:

- Canada
- Australia
- USA
- KSA
- Europe
- Brazil
- Nigeria

They visit their friends and family in the summer and holidays.

Notable migrants include the McGuire family in Sydney, Australia whose original surname "Hajjeh" was changed by the government on arrival.

John McGuire who was a judge at the district court.

Mark McGuire was changed in Australia and who went on to become Lebanese-Australian of the year in 2010.

Mark's son Mark McGuire Jr. is currently a leading cardiologist and professor at Royal Prince Alfred Hospital.

== Main families ==
The main families of Kaferkahel are:

- Hadid (حديد), which is the biggest family in the village
- Al-Ashkar (الأشقر)
- Mahfouz (محفوظ)
- El-Nabbout (النبوت)
- Hajjeh (الحاجّة)
- Abdul Qader (عبد القادر)
- Semsom (سمسم)
- Moufarej (مفرج)

In 1953, Kaferkahel had a population of 69 living in 24 households.

== River ==
The Kadisha River (Arabic: نهر قاديشا), also known as Nahr Abu-A'ali (Arabic: نهر أبو علي), passes through this village.

== Election of the municipalities of Kaferkahel ==
Assaad Mahfouz is the current president of the municipality of Kfarqahel (كفرقاحل), a village in the Koura District of Lebanon. He was elected during the most recent municipal elections held on April 11. This marked a shift in local leadership, replacing the long-standing former president Nizar Abdul Qader. Mahfouz’s election reflects both local support and broader political alignment within the region.
