= Nehme (given name) =

- Gender: Unisex

Origin
- Origin: Arabic
- Meaning: "Blessing" or "grace"
- Region of origin: Arab world

Nehme (Arabic: نعمة) is an Arabic unisex given name, meaning "blessing" or "grace".

While originally a given name, Nehme has developed into a common Lebanese surname. Indeed, the Nehme family is believed to stem from the Daou family tree with one of its sons, Nehme Daou, as the father of all Nehme families within the Levant.

== Notable people ==
- Naâma (1934–2020), born Halima Echeikh, Tunisian singer
- Naïma Laouadi (born 1976), Algerian football player and manager
- Neama Riadh (born 1989), Iraqi television presenter
- Neemat Frem (born 1967), Lebanese businessman and politician
- Ni'ma Abd Nayef al-Jabouri, known as Abu Fatima al-Jaheishi, ISIS member
- Nima Abu-Wardeh, Palestinian-British broadcast journalist
- Nima Elbagir (born 1978), Sudanese journalist
- Noam Shuster-Eliassi, Israeli comedian

== See also ==
- Nehme (surname), a Lebanese surname
- Nimatullah, an Arabic male given name
