= Kifraya =

Village in Koura District, Lebanon

Coordinates: 34.2955°N 35.7184°E

Kifraya كفريا
- Village
- Location within Lebanon
- Country: Lebanon
- Governorate: North
- District: Koura

Kifraya (Arabic: كفريا), also spelled Kafraiya, is a village in the Koura District, in the Northern Governorate of Lebanon. The population is majorly conformed by Sunni Muslims. In 1953, the village had a population of 474.

== Demographics ==
In 2014, Muslims made up 83.45% and Christians made up 16.40% of registered voters in Kifraya. 82.02% of the voters were Sunni Muslims and 13.92% were Maronite Catholics.
