= Bkeftine =

Village in Koura District, Lebanon

Bkeftine بكفتين
- Village
- Location within Lebanon
- Coordinates: 34°23′00″N 35°52′00″E
- Country: Lebanon
- Governorate: North Governorate
- District: Koura District
- Time zone: UTC+2 (EET)
  - Summer (DST): UTC+3 (EEST)
- Dialing code: +961

Bkeftine (Arabic: بكفتين, romanized: Bkeftīn) is a village in the Koura District of Lebanon. The population is majorly Greek Orthodox and includes other confessions. It is 180 metres above sea level, and has an area of 2.6 square kilometres (0.99 sq mi). In 2004 there were 941 residents, of whom 602 were registered voters but just 380 actually voted in the municipal elections.

== Demographics ==
In 2014, Christians made up 86.89% and Muslims made up 12.34% of registered voters in Bkeftine. 60.41% of the voters were Greek Orthodox, 23.91% were Maronite Catholics and 12.08% were Sunni Muslims.
