= Bneyel =

Village in Koura District, Lebanon

Bneyel بدنايل
- Village
- Country: Lebanon
- Governorate: North
- District: Koura

Bneyel (Arabic: بدنايل), also spelled Bednayel, is a village in the Koura District of Lebanon. In 1953, Bneyel had a population of 129 living in 29 households.

== Demographics ==
In 2014, Muslims made up 99.29% of registered voters in Bneyel. 96.68% of the voters were Sunni Muslims.
