= Deddeh =

Village in Lebanon

Coordinates: 34.3808°N 35.8009°E

Deddeh دده
- Village
- Location within Lebanon
- Country: Lebanon
- Governorate: North
- District: Koura
- Elevation: 295 m (968 ft)

Population
  - Total: 5,457

Deddeh, Deddé, (Arabic: دده) is a village in the Koura District of Lebanon. It is located 295 metres above sea level and has an area of 7.1 square kilometres (2.75 sq mi). The villagers are Greek Orthodox Christian and Sunni Muslim. The town had a population of 985 in 1953, but today, there are 3993 residents in Deddeh. In the last municipal elections of 2004, Deddeh counted 5457 registered voters of which 3444 actually voted.

== Demographics ==
In 2014, Christians made up 56.85% and Muslims made up 42.73% of registered voters in Deddeh. 51.85% of the voters were Greek Orthodox and 41.06% were Sunni Muslims.
