= Badebhoun =

Village in Koura District, Lebanon

Coordinates: 34.3366°N 35.7560°E

Badebhoun بدبهون
- Village
- Location within Lebanon
- Country: Lebanon
- Governorate: North
- District: Koura

Badebhoun (Arabic: بدبهون) is a Sunni Muslim village in the Koura District of the North Governorate of Lebanon.

== Demographics ==
In 2014 Muslims made up 99.42% of registered voters in Badebhoun. 97.09% of the voters were Sunni Muslims.
