= Maziriit Toula =

Eastern Orthodox village in Koura District of Lebanon

- Village
- Country: Lebanon
- Governorate: North
- District: Koura

Maziriit Toula is an Eastern Orthodox and Maronite village in Koura District of Lebanon. In 1953, the village had a population of 113.
