= Stephen Nehmé =

Lebanese Maronite Catholic monk (1889–1938)

Blessed Stephen Nehmé OLM
- Portrait of Blessed Stephen Nehmé
- Born: 8 March 1889; Lehfed, Mount Lebanon Mutasarrifate
- Died: 30 August 1938 (aged 49); Kfifan, Batroun, Lebanon
- Venerated in: Roman Catholic Church; Syriac Maronite Church of Antioch
- Beatified: 27 June 2010, Convent of Ss. Cyprian and Justina, Kfifan, Lebanon by Cardinal Angelo Amato (on behalf of Pope Benedict XVI)
- Feast: 30 August

Stephen Nehmé (born Yūsuf Nehmé, Arabic: يوسف نعمة; 8 March 1889 – 30 August 1938), was a Lebanese Maronite professed religious from the Lebanese Maronite Order. Nehmé worked to alleviate people's pain during World War I through the distribution of food to those suffering from famine and was known for an intense devotion to the Mother of God. He worked in the fields of his convent and other monasteries and also worked in construction for a brief period, he became well known and other monasteries sought him to live with them for his spiritual insight and work ethic.

Nehmé was beatified on 27 June 2010 in Lebanon.

== Life ==
Yūsuf Nehmé was born on 8 March 1889 in Lehfed in Lebanon as the last of seven children to Estephanos Bou Haykal Nehmé and Christina Badawi Hanna Khaled. He had three male siblings and two female siblings. He was baptized on 15 March 1889 at the church of Our Lady in Lehfed; it was Father Gerges Fadel that baptized him. His father died in 1903.

Nehmé studied under the Lebanese Maronite Order at the Our Lady of Grace school in Sakii Rishmaya. A tale from his childhood reports that he once observed a badger enter a cave; Nehmé dug at that spot and unearthed a spring which is known at present as the "Badger's Fountain". In 1905 he entered the novitiate of the Lebanese Maronite Order at the convent of Saints Cyprian and Justina in Kfifan. Nehmé made his monastic vows on 23 August 1907 in the name of Esțfan. He made his solemn vows as a professed religious on 13 April 1924. At various monasteries he did manual labor in the fields and gardens as well as working in construction and as a carpenter. Nehmé's contemporaries made special note of his constant repetition of the mantra: "God can see me". During World War I he distributed food to those suffering from famine.

Nehmé died of a severe fever that led to a stroke at 7:00 p.m. on 30 August 1938 at the convent in Kfifan. Moments before his death Brother Charbel Nehmeh asked him if it would be fine to fetch water and the monk replied Nehmeh could do so if he wanted. The monk died mere moments after as his fellow friar searched for water. His remains reside at the convent of Saints Cyprian and Justina has been said to have been found incorrupt. Monks investigating the tomb on 10 March 1951 found that his remains had not decomposed. The remains were moved to a new tomb where visitors seek his intercession and ask for his healing.

== Beatification ==
The beatification process started in a diocesan process that spanned for several weeks from 27 November 2001 until 17 December 2001 while the formal introduction came under Pope John Paul II on 16 January 2002 after the Congregation for the Causes of Saints issued the official "nihil obstat" to the cause and titled him as a Servant of God. The C.C.S. later validated the diocesan process in Rome on 26 April 2002 and received the Positio in 2005 for assessment.

Theologians met and approved the cause on 2 March 2007 as did the C.C.S. members on 16 October 2007 which in turn allowed for Pope Benedict XVI to name him as Venerable on 17 December 2007 upon the confirmation of his heroic virtue. The process for a miracle took place where it originated in and later received C.C.S. validation on 14 February 2003 before receiving the approval of the medical board in Rome on 1 October 2009. Theologians later assented to this on 16 December 2009 as did the C.C.S. on 16 March 2010 before Pope Benedict XVI approved the miracle and beatification on 27 March 2010.

Nehmé's beatification took place in Lebanon on 27 June 2010, Archbishop Angelo Amato presided over the celebration on the pope's behalf. The miracle in question was the cure of Sister Marina Nehmeh from osteosarcoma. The President and the Prime Minister of the nation were both in attendance as were 50 thousand other people.

The current postulator assigned to this cause is the Rev. Boulos Azzi.
