= Bnehran =

Muslim village in Koura District, Lebanon

Bnehran بنهران
- Village
- Location within Lebanon
- Coordinates: 34°16′25″N 35°51′06″E
- Country: Lebanon
- Governorate: North Governorate
- District: Koura District
- Time zone: UTC+2 (EET)
  - Summer (DST): UTC+3 (EEST)
- Dialing code: +961

Bnehran (Arabic: بنهران), also spelled Bnehrane, is a Muslim village in the Koura District of Lebanon. It is 570 metres above sea level and has an area of 2.7 square kilometres (1.05 sq mi). It has 50 households and 566 residents.

== Demographics ==
In 2014, Muslims made up 99.01% of registered voters in Bnehran. 92.59% of the voters were Shiite Muslims.
