= Bkomra =

Sunni Muslim village in Koura District, Lebanon

Coordinates: 34.4000°N 35.8119°E

- Village
- Location within Lebanon
- Country: Lebanon
- Governorate: North
- District: Koura

Bkomra is a Sunni Muslim village in Koura District of Lebanon. It is also spelt Bkumra or Bkumrā.
