= Bdebba =

Village in Koura District, Lebanon

- بدبا
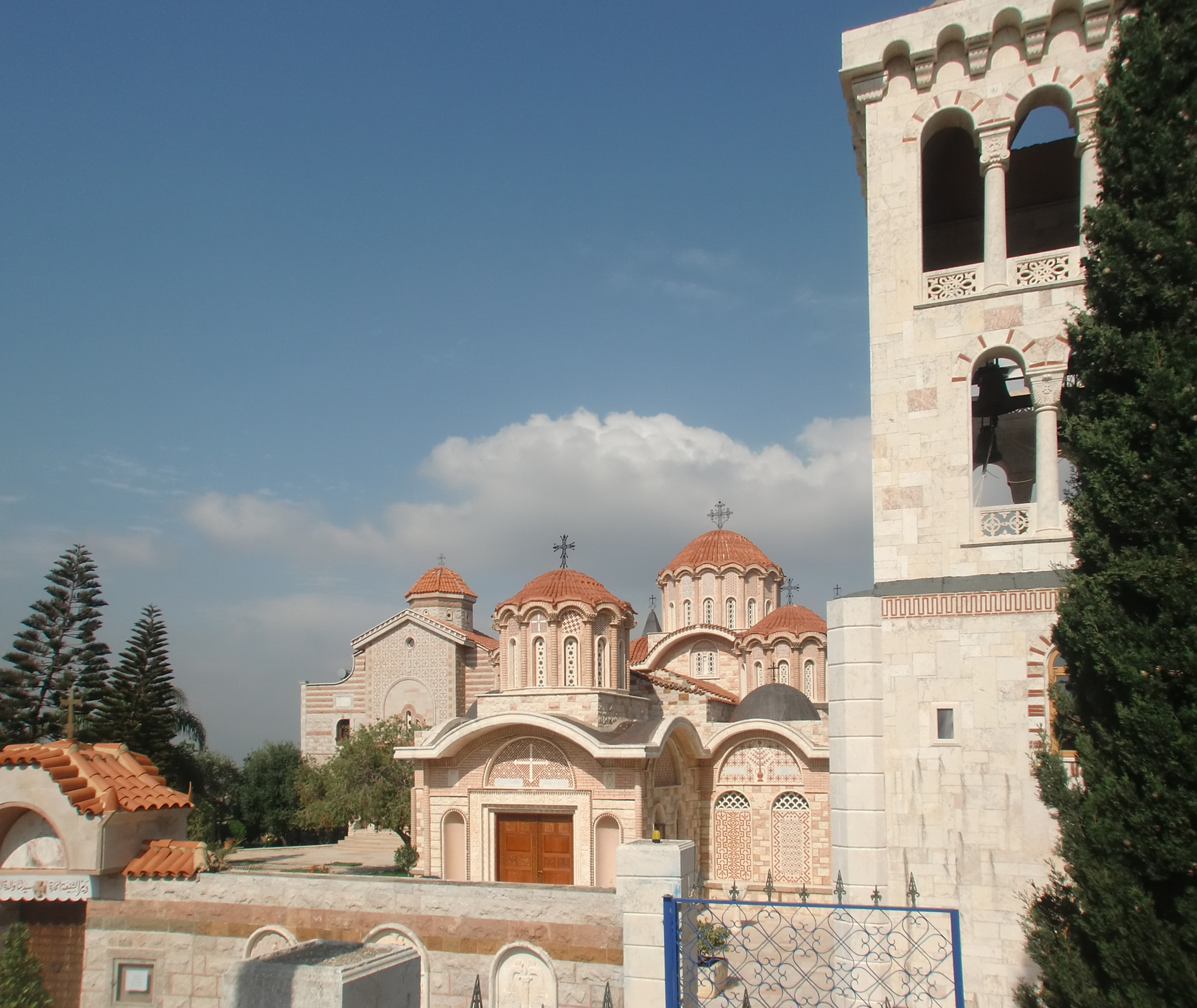
- Interactive map of Bdebba
- Coordinates: 34°20′51″N 35°49′12″E
- Country: Lebanon
- Governorate: North Governorate

Area
  - Total: 0.72 sq mi (1.87 km^{2})
- Elevation: 950 ft (290 m)

Population
  - Total: 1,200
- Time zone: UTC+2 (EST)
  - Summer (DST): +3

Bdebba (Arabic: بدبا) is a village in Koura District of Lebanon. It has a Maronite and Greek Orthodox population.

== Etymology ==
The word Bdebba has Syriac origins and is formed of two parts: "Bet" and "Dibba”. “Bet” means “house” (بيت) and “Dibba” means “bear” (الدب). Hence, Bdebba is the house of the bear (بيت الدب). This etymological analysis can be supported by archeological finding in the area. Indeed, an excavation by a team from Tokyo University Scientific Expedition to Western Asia in the Keoue area, a river bed that separates Bdebba and Bterram, and the artifacts found led to the conclusion that the occupants of the site were probably big bear hunters using small points.

== Location ==
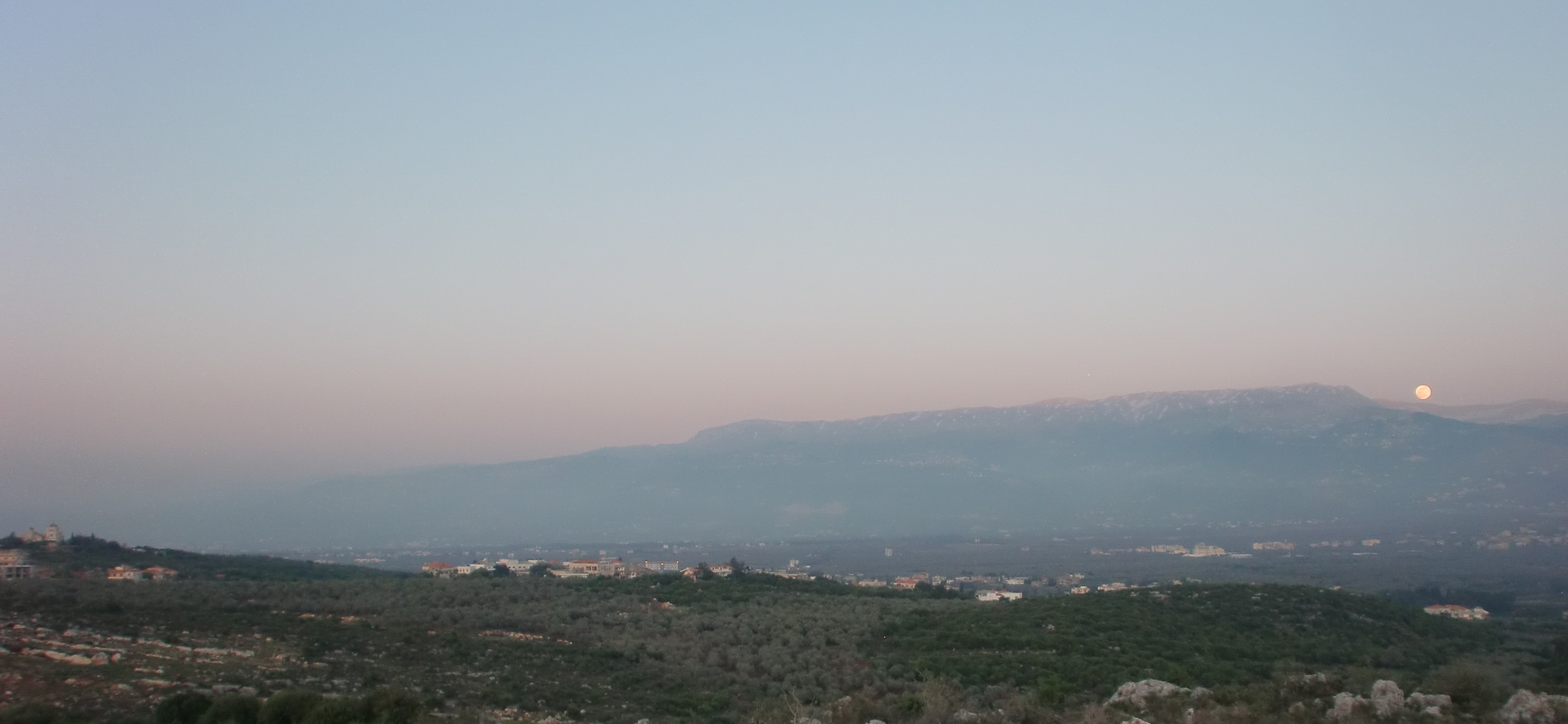
Bdebba landscape

The town of Bdebba is located in the Qada’a of Koura in the North governorate at an average altitude of 900 feet (270 meters) above sea level. Bdebba is 45 miles (72 kilometers) north of Beirut 3.5 miles (5.6 kilometers) east of the Mediterranean sea and 6 miles (9.7 kilometers) south of Tripoli (Trablous) Lebanon 2nd largest city. The town extends over an area of approximately 462 acres, (1 ft (0.30 m)²)most of the land is planted with olive trees.

=== Coordinates ===
34° 20' 53" North

35° 49' 11" East

== Population ==
The number of voters reached 872 in 2000. increasing to 859 in 2004. In 2014, Christians made up 94.29% of registered voters in Bdebba. 80.35% of the voters were Greek Orthodox and 11.42% were Maronite Catholics.

=== Families ===
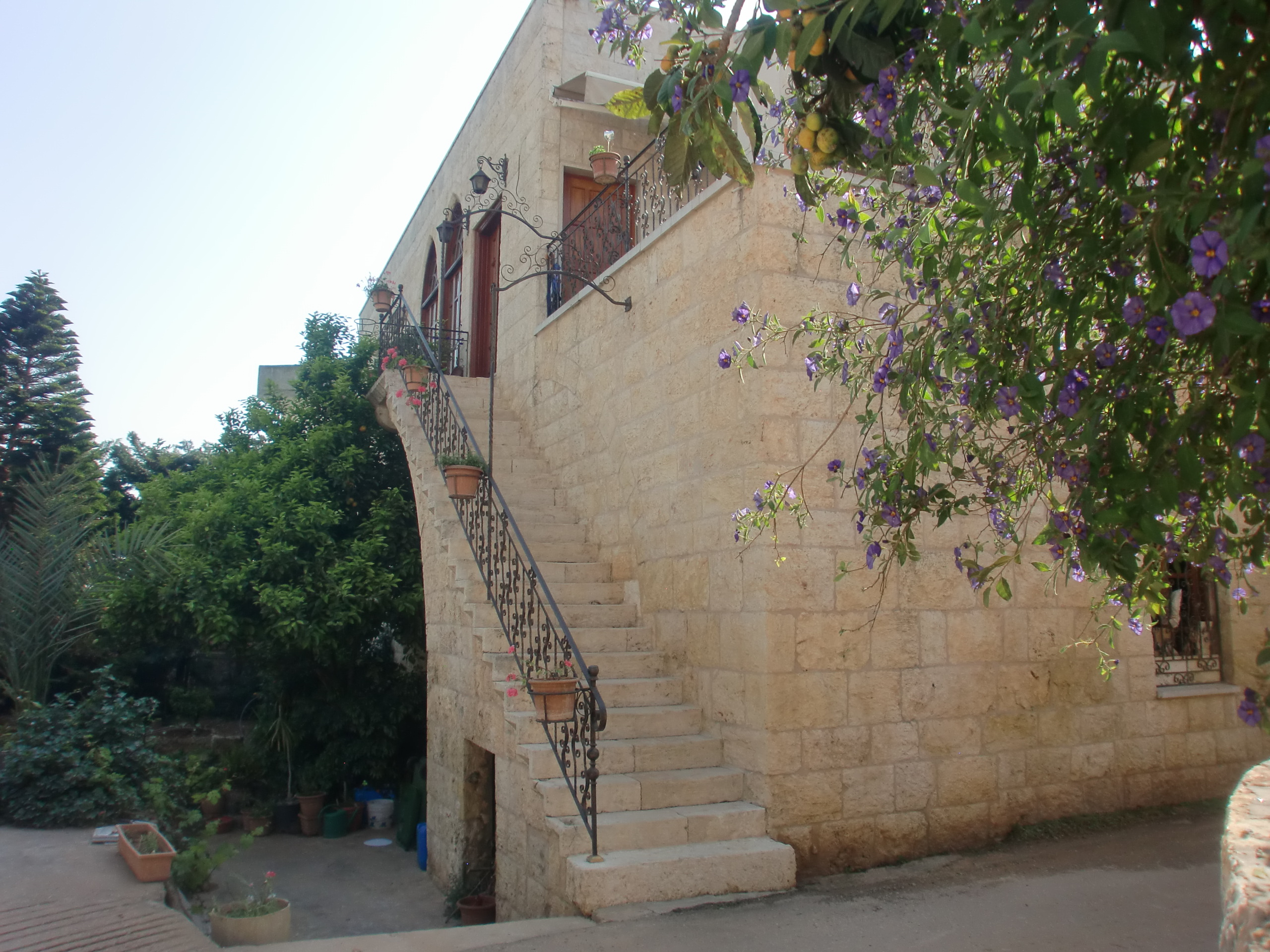
Traditional house in Bdebba

According to the 2004 municipal elections these are the most influential families in Bdebba:

- Khoury: 150 voters
- Daher: 72 voters
- Jabbour: 60 voters
- Saadeh: 50 voters
- Jreige: 50 voters
- Chikhani: 43 voters
- Moussa: 35 voters
- Abi Saab: 30 voters
- Nehmeh: 30 voters
- Armesh: 25 voters
- Sleiman: 20 voters
- Barakat: 20 voters

Other families include: Hajj, Nassar, Ibrahim, Chakkour, Youssef, Fayyad, Qormesh, Ya’acoub, Tannous, Merched, Itani, Ghazi, Razzouk, Maik, Gerges, Derkhashadorian, Allawi, Tarraq, Boustani, and Sassine.

== Local authorities ==
Until 2004 the highest authority in town was the mukhtar (mayor); headed by Lila Khoury and the vice Mayor Georgette Khoury.

Since 2004 municipality was created in Bdebba in line with decision no. 818 of December 30, 2003. The municipal council is formed of 9 members and is headed by Zafer Khoury. The town still has a mukhtar (mayor) and a mayoral council.

== Economy ==
Residents depend on the cultivation of olive, production of olive oil and olive soap, some cultivate fig, grapes, grapefruits, mostly for personal consumption.

Also the immigrants to the United States of America, Canada, Argentina, Brazil, Mexico, Africa, Saudi Arabia, Kuwait and the other Gulf states send money to their families.

== Archeological and cultural sites ==
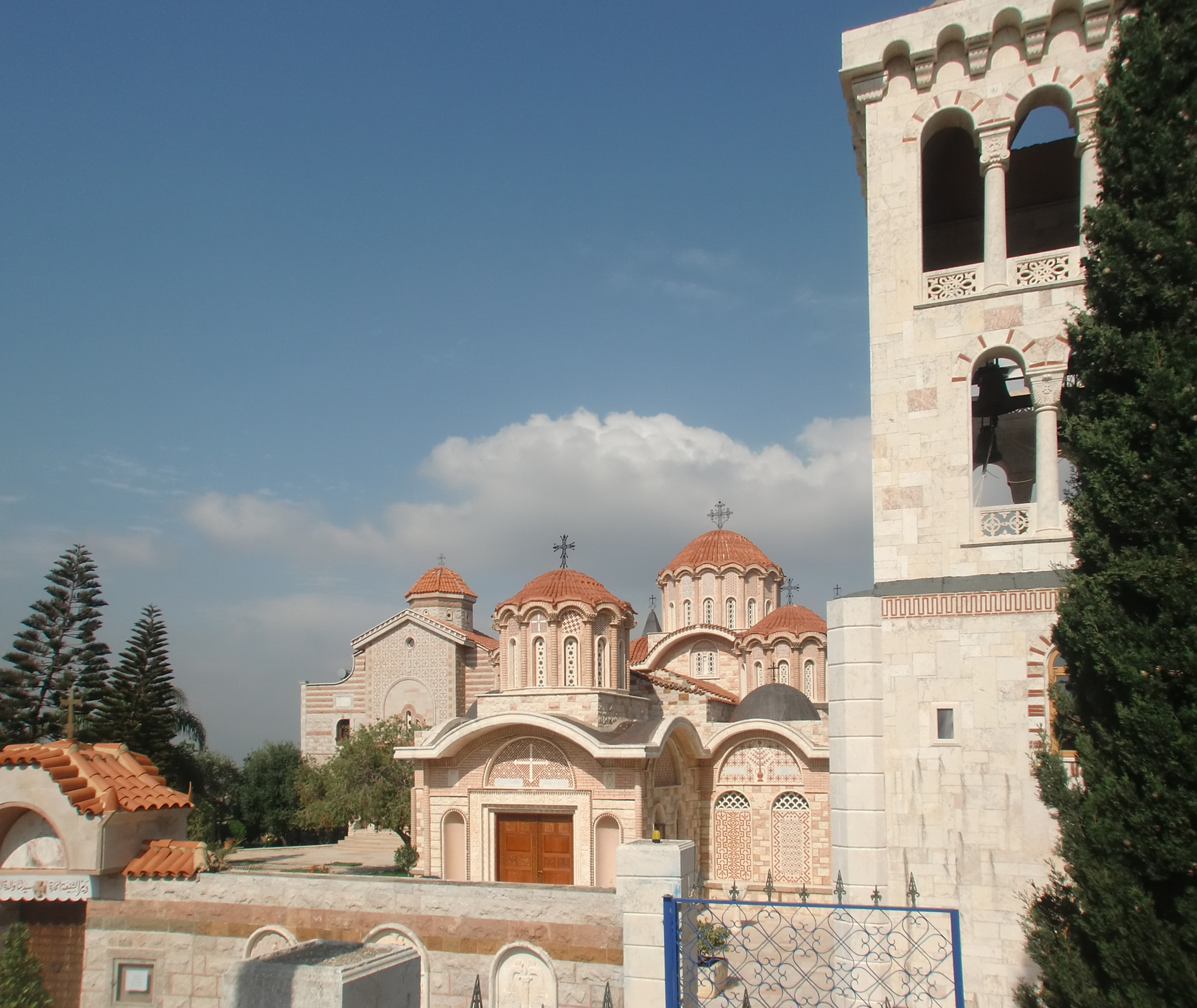
Virgin Mary Monastery

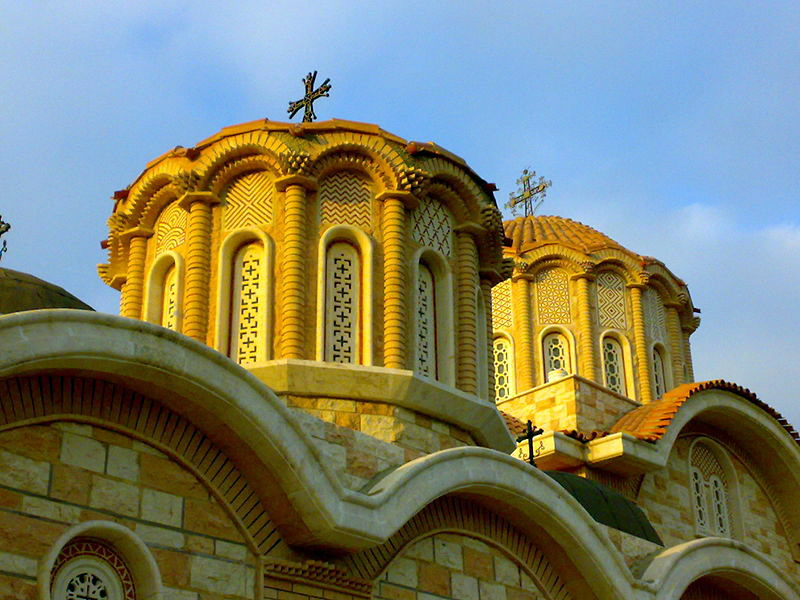
Virgin Mary Monastery

Bdebba have ruins that date back to the Phoenician period. Those include ancient caves and sarcophagi. Ruins from the Crusades era were also discovered in the town.

There are also two Greek Orthodox churches and a monastery.

== Education ==
There are no schools in Bdebba, elementary school students go to nearby towns, some students seeking a college degree go to United States or Europe.

There is almost no illiteracy, most residents also speak, French and/or English, and/ or Spanish.
