= Ali-al-Mouran =

Eastern Orthodox village in Koura District of Lebanon

- Village
- Country: Lebanon
- Governorate: North
- District: Koura

Ali-al-Mouran is an Eastern Orthodox village in Koura District of Lebanon.
