= Kelbata =

Maronite and Sunni Muslim village in Koura District of Lebanon

Coordinates: 34°17′N 35°44′E

Kelbata كلباتا
- Village
- Location within Lebanon
- Country: Lebanon
- Governorate: North
- District: Koura

Kelbata (Arabic: كلباتا, romanized: Klbātā) is a Maronite and Sunni Muslim village in Koura District of Lebanon.
