= Bchernata =

Greek Orthodox village in Koura District of Lebanon

Coordinates: 34.3435°N 35.9873°E

Bchernata بشرناطا
- Village
- Location within Lebanon
- Country: Lebanon
- Governorate: North
- District: Koura

Bcherneta (Arabic: بشرناطا, romanized: Bshernāṭā) is an Eastern Orthodox village in the Koura District of Lebanon.
