= Kfarsaroun =

Village in Koura District, Lebanon

Coordinates: 34°15′N 35°58′E

Kfarsaroun كفر صارون
- Village
- Location within Lebanon
- Country: Lebanon
- Governorate: North
- District: Koura

Kfarsaroun (Arabic: كفر صارون, romanized: Kfar Ṣārūn), also spelled Kfar Saroun is a village in the Koura District, in the Northern Governorate of Lebanon. The population is mainly Greek Orthodox with a Maronite minority.

== Demographics ==
In 2014, Christians made up 96.45% of registered voters in Kfarsaroun. 78.95% of the voters were Greek Orthodox and 15.66% were Maronite Catholics.

== Notable residents ==
- Fadi Karam (Member of the Lebanese Parliament)
- Professor Afif Hadj (General & Trauma Surgeon in Melbourne, Australia), born in Kfarsaroun in 1948.
