= Ejdabrine =

Village in Koura District, Lebanon

Ejdabrine إجدَعِبرين
- Village
- Ejdabrine
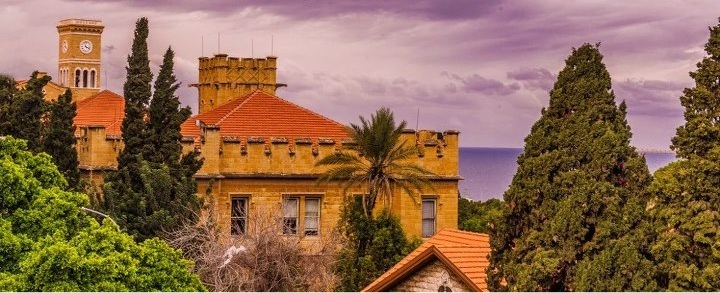
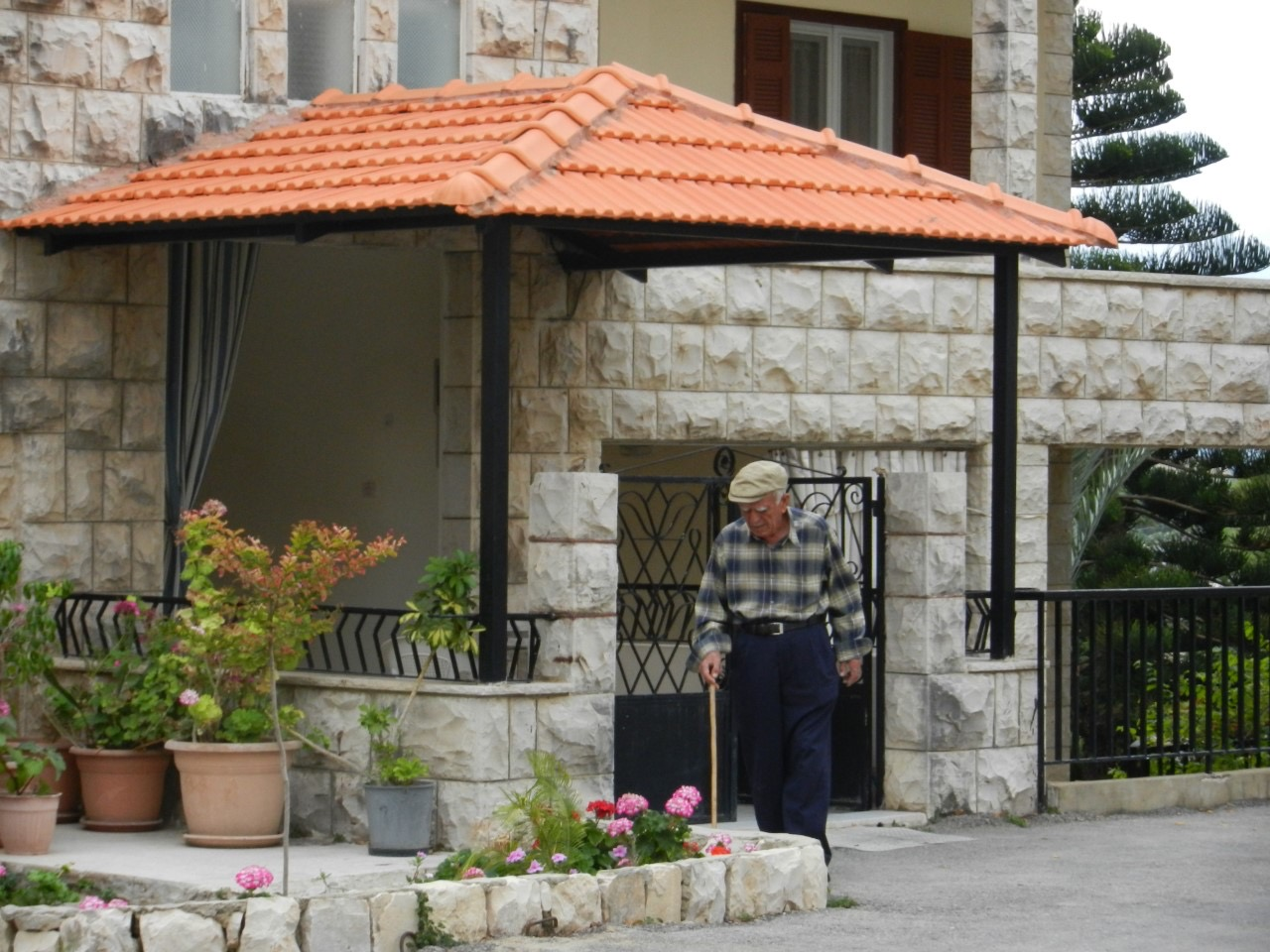
- Ejdabrine Village

- Location of Ejdabrine within Lebanon Ejdabrine (Eastern Mediterranean) Ejdabrine (Mediterranean)
- Coordinates: 34°16′19″N 35°44′49″E
- Country: Lebanon
- Governorate: North Lebanon Governorate
- District: Koura District

Area
  - Total: 2.73 km^{2} (1.05 sq mi)
- Elevation: 336 m (1,102 ft)
- Time zone: UTC+2 (EET)
  - Summer (DST): UTC+3 (EEST)
- Postal code: 00000
- Area code: +961

Ejdabrine (Arabic: إجدَعِبرين, /'iijdebrin/), also spelled Ejd Aabrine, is a Sunni Muslim-majority community in the Koura District of Lebanon.

== Etymology ==
Equidistantly, the village shares similarity in name with two other villages not geographically far from it. Abrine and Ijdabra are the two villages, both of which are located in the Batroun District. Abrine (Arabic: عبرين), Ijdabra (Arabic: إجدَعَبر), and Ejdabrine (Arabic: إجدَعِبرين). "Abr" (Arabic: عبر) means across. "Ijd" or "Ejd" (Arabic: إجد) means [go] find. The "ine" (Arabic: ين) is a common Arabic tool used to make a word refer to two in which "Abrine" would mean "two paths". So Ejdabrine in whole would literally mean, "[go] find two paths". If the meaning of the name truly is this, geographically speaking, one logical explanation would go back to the Jaouz river trees in which the name is in reference to that. Another possibility of the name is the literal entrance to the village, which, in turn, is hard to explain how it might reference to the name, and that might be a reason why the name may not actually refer to the village's entrance. Of course, the translation is not limited to that as "Ejd" could mean a variety of things. Several of those meanings could be "renewed", "grandfather", "[I] found", and, in Arabic, the word is a variation of "prowess" or "strength". Same with "Abr" in which the word could also mean a variety of things. Another possibility is that this name comes from another language or is a mix of Arabic with a different language. The different languages could vary from Phoenician (Greek), French, Spanish, and Aramaic.

== Geography ==
=== Abrine & Ijdabra ===
Ejdabrine being at Southernmost of the Koura District, the villages, Abrine and Ijdabra, are located in the Batroun District. Abrine is about 26 km Southwest of Ejdabrine, and Ijdabra is right below Abrine, the two separated only by the Batroun-Tannourine Road and the Cross of Hope in between the two villages.

== Demographics ==
In 2014, Muslims made up 61.14% and Christians made up 38.74% of registered voters in Ejdabrine. 59.28% of the voters were Sunni Muslims and 34.42% were Maronite Catholics.
