= Bhabouch =

Maronite village in Koura District, Lebanon

Coordinates: 34.2765°N 35.8293°E

Bhabouch بحبوش
- Village
- Location within Lebanon
- Country: Lebanon
- Governorate: North
- District: Koura

Bhabouch (Arabic: بحبوش, romanized: Bḥabūsh), also spelled Bhabbouch is a Maronite Christians and Shia Muslims village in the Koura District of Lebanon.

== Demographics ==
In 2014, Christians made up 66.99% and Muslims made up 32.03% of registered voters in Bhabouch. 63.24% of the voters were Maronite Catholics and 29.58% were Shiite Muslims.
