= Barsa, Lebanon =

Village in Koura District, Lebanon

Coordinates: 34°23′N 35°50′E

Barsa, Lebanon برسا
- Village
- Location within Lebanon
- Country: Lebanon
- Governorate: North
- District: Koura

Barsa (Arabic: برسا, romanized: Barsā) is a village in the Koura District of the North Governorate of Lebanon. It has a Maronite and Greek Orthodox population. It has one of the most Cryptocurrency miners in Koura District.

== Demographics ==
In 2014 Christians made up 96.73% of registered voters in Barsa. 71.21% of the voters were Maronite Catholics and 22.49% were Greek Orthodox.

== Twinned towns ==
Barsa is twinned with:

- Alert, Canada
- Thebes, Greece
- Tripoli, Greece
