= Nigmatullino =

Nigmatullino Нигматуллино
- Selo
- Location within Bashkortostan Location within Russia
- Coordinates: 54°00′N 55°20′E
- Country: Russia
- Region: Bashkortostan
- District: Alsheyevsky District
- Time zone: UTC+5:00

Nigmatullino (Russian: Нигматуллино; Bashkir: Ниғмәтулла, Niğmätulla) is a rural locality (a selo) and the administrative center of Nigmatullinsky Selsoviet, Alsheyevsky District, Bashkortostan, Russia. The population was 553 as of 2010. There are 8 streets.

== Geography ==
Nigmatullino is located 32 km southeast of Rayevsky (the district's administrative centre) by road. Sartbash is the nearest rural locality.
