= Barghoun =

Village in Koura District, Lebanon

Coordinates: 34°21′N 35°45′E

Barghoun برغون
- Village
- Location within Lebanon
- Country: Lebanon
- Governorate: North
- District: Koura

Barghoun (Arabic: برغون, romanized: Barghūn) is a village in the Koura District of the North Governorate of Lebanon. In the north of the village there lies the remains of a 12th-14th-century church dedicated to Saint Barbara.

== Demographics ==
In 2014 Muslims made up 99.43% of registered voters in Barghoun. 96.87% of the voters were Sunni Muslims.
