= Nameh Beyt Hardan =

Nameh Beyt Hardan نعمه بيت حردان
- Village
- Location within Iran
- Coordinates: 31°32′22″N 48°08′11″E
- Country: Iran
- Province: Khuzestan
- County: Dasht-e Azadegan
- Bakhsh: Central
- Rural District: Howmeh-ye Sharqi

Population (2006)
  - Total: 174
- Time zone: UTC+3:30 (IRST)
  - Summer (DST): UTC+4:30 (IRDT)

Nameh Beyt Hardan (Persian: نعمه بيت حردان, also Romanized as Na‘meh Beyt Ḩardān; also known as Na‘meh) is a village in Howmeh-ye Sharqi Rural District, in the Central District of Dasht-e Azadegan County, Khuzestan Province, Iran. At the 2006 census, its population was 174, in 24 families.
