= Naameh, Iran =

Naameh نعمه
- Village
- Location within Iran
- Coordinates: 27°28′23″N 53°24′44″E
- Country: Iran
- Province: Fars
- County: Lamerd
- Bakhsh: Central
- Rural District: Chah Varz

Population (2006)
  - Total: 174
- Time zone: UTC+3:30 (IRST)
  - Summer (DST): UTC+4:30 (IRDT)

Naameh (Persian: نعمه, also Romanized as Na‘ameh; also known as Naghmeh and Nahmeh) is a village in Chah Varz Rural District, in the Central District of Lamerd County, Fars province, Iran. At the 2006 census, its population was 174, in 38 families.
