= Kfarhazir =

Village in Koura District, Lebanon

Kfarhazir كفرحزير
- City
- Location within Lebanon
- Coordinates: 34°18′28″N 35°46′25″E
- Country: Lebanon
- Governorate: North Governorate
- District: Koura District

Area
  - Total: 12.1 km^{2} (4.7 sq mi)
- Highest elevation: 350 m (1,150 ft)
- Lowest elevation: 200 m (660 ft)

Population (1953)
  - Total: 917
  - Density: 75.8/km^{2} (196/sq mi)
- Time zone: UTC+2 (EET)
  - Summer (DST): UTC+3 (EEST)
- Dialing code: +961

Kfarhazir (Arabic: كفر حزير, romanized: Kfar Ḥazīr) is a village in the Koura District of Lebanon. It is 350 meters above sea level, and has an area of 12.1 square kilometres (4.69 sq mi), and is the largest town in Koura District by size, with a population of about 60000. The population is mostly Greek Orthodox. In 1953, the town had a population of 917 with 168 households. The current mayor of Kfarhazir is Ibrahim Jeha.

== Location and Geography ==
Kfarhazir lies on a strategic hill in Koura, overlooking the Koura fields and towns from the east, and the Mediterranean sea from the west. Kfarhazir is Five minutes away from the sea, 35 minutes away from the mountains, and 55 minutes away from Beirut.

== Demographics ==
In 2014, Christians made up 99.43% of registered voters in Kfarhazir. 85.40% of the voters were Greek Orthodox.

== Churches ==
There are 5 Christian Churches in Kfarhazir:

- Church of Saint Jacob (Eastern Orthodox)
- Church of Saint James (Eastern Orthodox)
- Church of Al Sayydeh (Eastern Orthodox)
- Church of Saints Theodoros and George (Eastern Orthodox)
- Church of Saint Elias (Eastern Orthodox)
- Church of Saint Takla (Maronite Catholic)

== See also ==
- List of cities in Lebanon
- Eastern Orthodox Christianity in Lebanon
- University of Balamand
