= Nimatullah =

Nimatullah, also spelled Ni'matullāh, Nematollah etc. (Arabic: نعمة الله) is an Arabic male given name.

== Etymology ==
Unlike Persian "Nima", whether used as masculine and usually feminine name, may have been possibly adopted from the neighbouring Arabic noun-adjective "نِعْمَة - ni‘mah / ni‘amah" - basic meaning: "blessing" or other meanings: "abundance; benefaction; beneficence; blessing; boon; favor; grace; kindness", for example, a lesser-composite Muslim masculine name like "نِعْمَةُ ٱلله - Ni‘mat’Ullah / Ni‘amat’Ullah - Blessing of Allah (God)" or a secondary meaning in the following sentence explained. However, this "نِعْمَة - ni‘mah / ni‘amah" denoted and referenced in the Quran is meant as "the Favour(s)/ Grace of Allah (God)".

== People ==
- Shah Nimatullah Wali (1330–1431), Islamic scholar and Sufi poet
- Ignatius Ni'matallah (c. 1515–1587), Syriac Orthodox Patriarch of Antioch
- Nimat Allah al-Harawi (fl. 1613–1630), Mughal scholar
- Nematollah Jazayeri (1640–1700), Islamic scholar
- Naimatullah Khan (1930–2020), Pakistani politician and Mayor of Karachi
- Nimatullah Kassab (c. 1808–1858), Lebanese Maronite Catholic saint
- Hajj Nematollah (1871–1919), Iranian scholar
- Nematollah Nassiri (1911–1979), Iranian politician and diplomat
- Nematollah Salehi Najafabadi (1923/24–2006), Iranian cleric
- Nematollah Gorji (1926–2000), Iranian actor
- Nematollah Aghasi (1939–2005), Iranian singer
- Nematullah Shahrani (born 1941), Afghan scholar and politician
- Nemat (militant), Uzbek-Afghan Militant
- Nigmatilla Yuldashev (born 1962), Uzbek politician
- Nematullo Quttiboev (born 1973), Uzbek footballer
- Md. Nematullah, Indian politician
- Md. Niamatullah, Bangladehsi politician

== Places ==
- Shah Nematollah Vali Shrine, Iran
- Ni'matullāhī, Iranian Sufi order
- Nigmatullino, Russia

== See also ==
- List of Arabic theophoric names
