= Afsdik =

Village in Koura District, Lebanon

Coordinates: 34.3320°N 35.7881°E

Afsdik عفصديق
- Village
- Location within Lebanon
- Country: Lebanon
- Governorate: North
- District: Koura

Afsdik (Arabic: عفصديق, romanized: ʿAfṣdīq), also spelled Aafasdiq, is a village in the Koura District of Lebanon. It has a mixed Greek Orthodox and Sunni Muslim population.

== Demographics ==
In 2014 Christians made up 68.08% of registered voters in Afsdik and Muslims made up 31.59%. 62.40% of the voters were Greek Orthodox and 31.37% were Sunni Muslims.
