= Btourram =

Village in Koura District, Lebanon

Coordinates: 34.3312°N 35.8099°E

Btourram بطرام
- Village
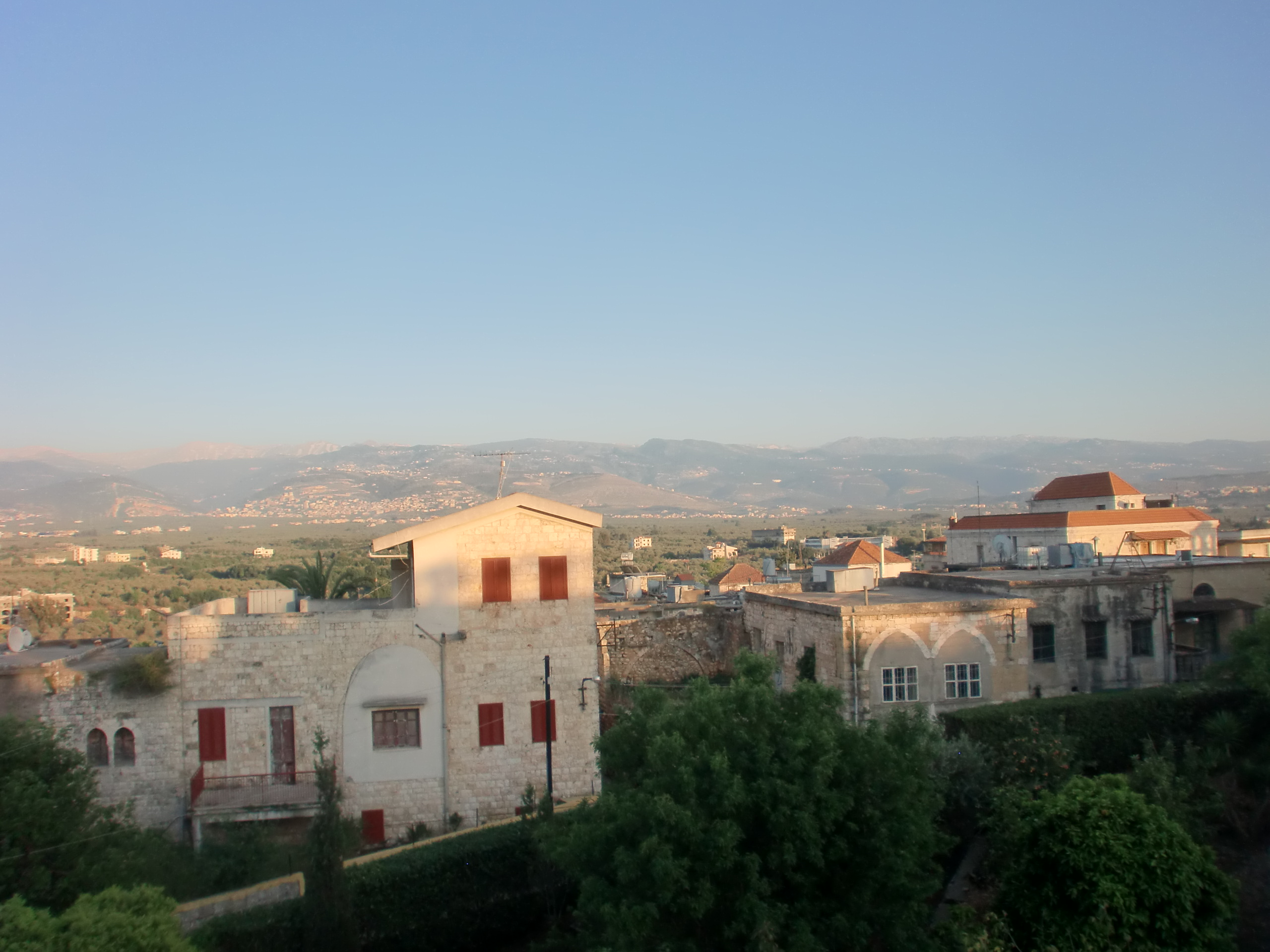
- Inside Btourram

- Location within Lebanon
- Country: Lebanon
- Governorate: North
- District: Koura

Btourram (Arabic: بطرام), also spelled Bterram, Bturan or Beturan is a village in the Koura District of Lebanon. The population is Greek Orthodox and other confessions. In 1953, Bterram had a population of 739 living in 75 households.

== Etymology ==
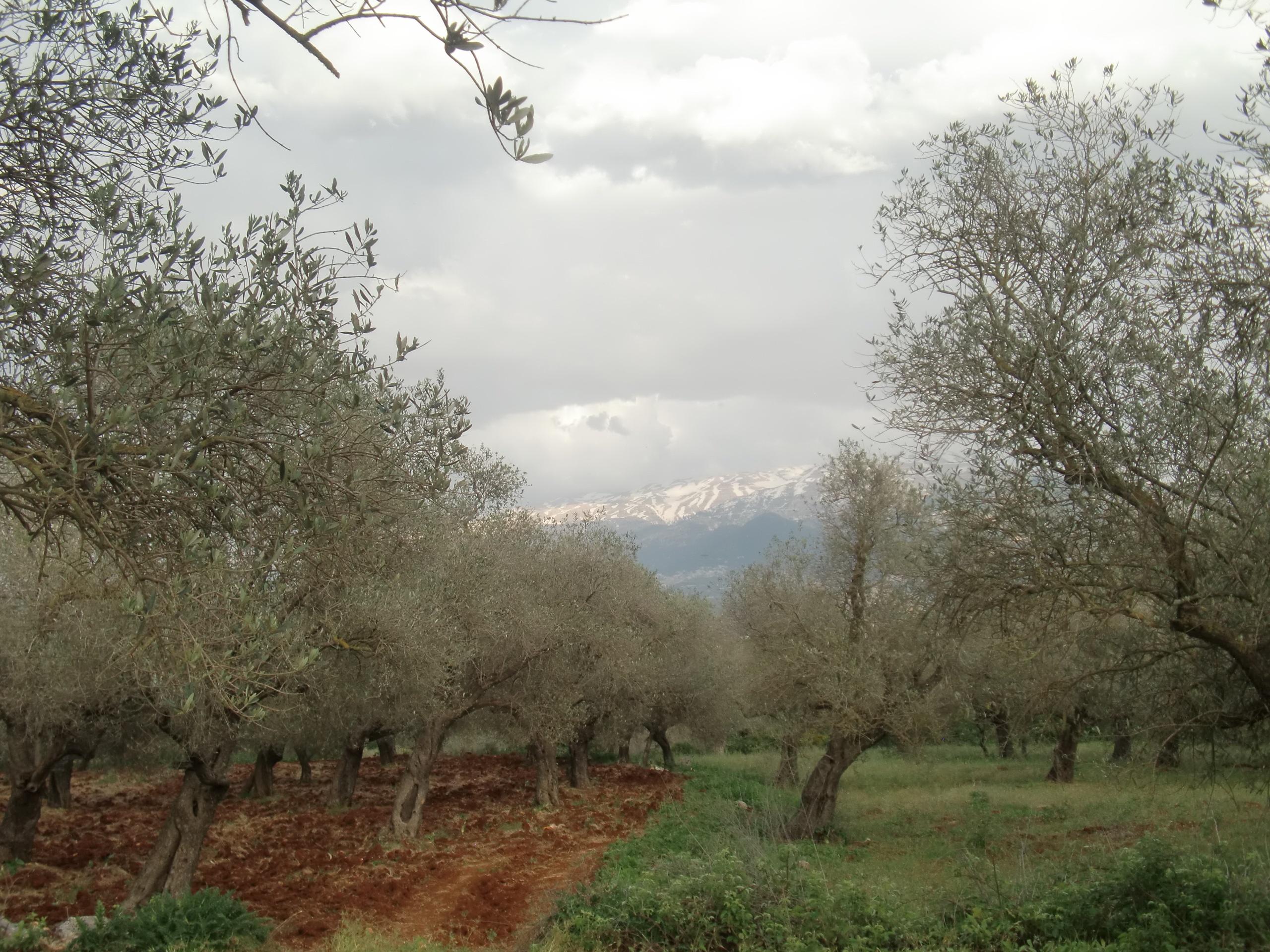
Olive field in Btourram

The known meanings of Btourram are the following:

- in Arabic "wind of the rock" or the rocky wind.
- "bet" "tur" "ram" means "House of the High Mountain".
- “beth” “turan” means “the temple” of “Turan” or Astarte (Phoenician/Canaanite Goddess).

== Demographics ==
In 2014, Christians made up 98.86% of registered voters in Btourram. 90.45% of the voters were Greek Orthodox.

== Local authorities ==
The municipal council is formed of 12 members headed by Dr. Haytham Serhan. Board members are Mikhael Salem, Elias Malek, John Serhan, George Sarkis, Marcelle Alagha, Ghada Salem, Henri Deeb, Ziad Yazbeck, Assaad Saoud, Souhail Serhan and George Malek. The mukhtar (mayors) are Khalil Salem and Michel Deeb.

== Family and education ==
Btourram's family names are: Abboud, Alagha, Deab, Fellah, Jabbour, Jarjoura, Kalash, Khawli, Khoury, Makhoul, Mushahwar, Malek, Melki, Naser, Salem Saker, Sarkis, Serhan, Sha, Srour, Tannous, Yazbek, Younes...

Some of the most influential people are: Charles Malik, a philosopher and diplomat who was a leading figure in the drafting and adoption of the 1948 Universal Declaration of Human Rights and Elie Salem who held many influential political and academic positions and was the president of the Balamand University. Btourram has three schools: Khalil Salem High School headed by principal Michel Nasr, Khalil Salem Middle School and Universal School of Lebanon.

== Archeology ==
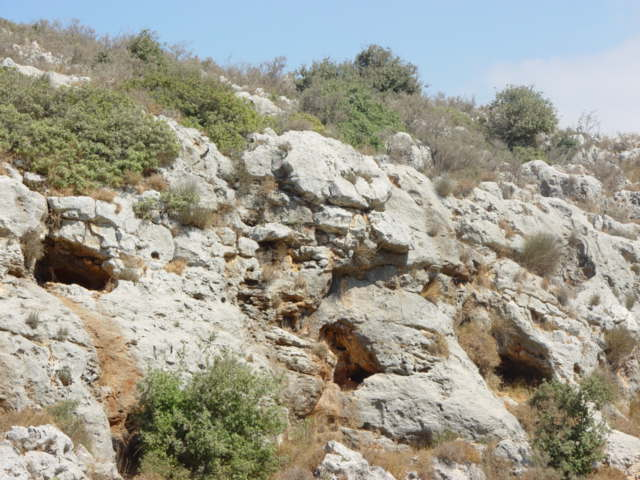
Btourram Wadi Keoue

In archeology, Btourram is known for its middle palaeolithic site of Keoue and an old underground sanctuary called Eshmunit. Btourram also has one church dedicated to Cosmas and Damian and one monastery dedicated to Virgin Mary. Both date from the Crusades era.
