= Fih, Lebanon =

Village in Lebanon

Fih فيع
- Village
- Location within Lebanon
- Coordinates: 34.3484°N 35.7883°E
- Country: Lebanon
- Governorate: North
- District: Koura

Area
  - Total: 589 ha (1,460 acres)
- Elevation: 410 m (1,350 ft)

Population
  - Total: 1,276
  - Density: 217/km^{2} (561/sq mi)

Fih (Arabic: فيع, romanized: Fīʿ), also spelled Fiaa, is a Greek Orthodox Christian village situated in the Koura District of Lebanon.

== Etymology ==
The name "Fih" is derived from an Aramaic root. Its meanings include "the place where the sheep bleat", "the abundance and exuberance", "the beautiful and charming" and "of wind and breeze".

== Demographics ==
In 2014, Christians made up 93.76% of registered voters in Fih. 87.32% of the voters were Greek Orthodox.

== The High Hill ==
Since the Phoenician age the tradition was to choose high ground to build altars and temples.

The tradition is referenced in the Bible: "For they also built them high places, and images, and groves, on every high hill, and under every green tree." 1 Kings 14:23

Fih is one of the highest hills in El-Koura overlooking the coast and was one of the most important sacred hills in the region. Fih remains the center of the celebration of St. Simon, its patron saint. The shrine is surrounded by cemeteries.

== Notable residents ==
- Nicola Yanney, an Orthodox Christian priest ordained by St. Raphael of Brooklyn. Fr. Yanney emigrated to the United States around 1893, settling in Nebraska. He was an important figure in the early Syrian (Lebanese) Orthodox Church in America and the first to serve the Orthodox community in the Midwest. He died in 1918 from the Spanish Flu. A detailed biography of Fr. Yanney's life is available via the Moise A. Khayrallah Center for Lebanese Diaspora Studies' website.
- Fouad Sleiman, a Lebanese poet, who has written many poems displayed across the town.
