= Nehme (surname) =

Lebanese surname

- Pronunciation: [ˈnaʕme]

Origin
- Origin: Arabic
- Meaning: "blessing" or "grace"
- Region of origin: Lebanon

Other names
- Variant form: numerous

Nehme (Arabic: نعمة) is a prominent Lebanese surname which is derived from the given name Nehme. As of 2014, Nehme is the 39th most common surname in Lebanon with about 13,000 people holding the surname, or about one in 380 people.

== Etymology and history ==
The name derives from the Arabic word for “blessing” or “grace”.

The Nehme family is believed to stem from the Daou family tree with one of its sons, Nehme Daou, as the father of all Nehme families within the Levant. Lehfed, a small village near Byblos in the Byblos district of modern-day Lebanon, is believed to be the ancestral home of the Nehme family.

As Mount Lebanon was an area of continuous civil unrest at the end of the 19th century, many Nehme families were forced to flee to nearby towns, including the city of Deir el Qamar, while others ventured further south to reach the city of Haifa and beyond.

The surname Nehme is most prominent within Christian families in the north of Lebanon; Shia, Sunni, and Druze families in the country also share the surname. For example, a Shia branch of the family tree is also present in the south of Lebanon, specifically in the town of Mahrouna.

== Variations ==
Because of the challenges facing transliteration, many variations of Nehme exist such as Naama, Naameh, Neama, Neme, Nemeh, Nimah, Nimeh, and Ni'meh, alphabetically.

There are other Nehme families in the Middle East which may not be related to the Lebanese branch, for example in Iraq, Iran, Jordan, Qatar and the United Arab Emirates, who usually have the "Al-" or "Abu" prefix, such as Al-Neama or Abu Nimah.

== Notable people ==
=== Nehme ===
- Abeer Nehme (born 1980), Lebanese singer and musicologist
- Abraham Nehmé (1927–2022), Syrian archbishop
- Adel Nima (born 1970), Iraqi football coach and former player
- Angelo Nehmé (born 2004), Danish footballer
- Ghassan Nehme (born 1995), Lebanese basketball player
- Laïla Nehmé (born 1966), Lebanese-French archaeologist
- Lina Murr Nehmé (born 1955), French-Lebanese author and professor
- Raoul Nehme (born 1956), Lebanese minister of economy and trade
- Rodrigo Nehme (born 1982), Mexican actor
- Stephen Nehmé (1889–1938), Lebanese Maronite Catholic monk
- Tania Nehme (born 1966), Australian film editor
- Safaa Ali Nema (born 1959), Iraqi wrestler

=== Abu-Nehme ===
- Hasan Abu Nimah (born 1935), Jordanian ambassador
- Ali Abunimah (born 1971), Palestinian-American journalist

=== Al-Nehme ===
- Ahmad Alenemeh (born 1982), Iranian association football player

== See also ==
- Nehme (given name), an Arabic given name
