= Lebanese Greek Orthodox Christians =

Lebanese Greek Orthodox Christians المسيحية الأرثوذكسية الرومية في لبنان
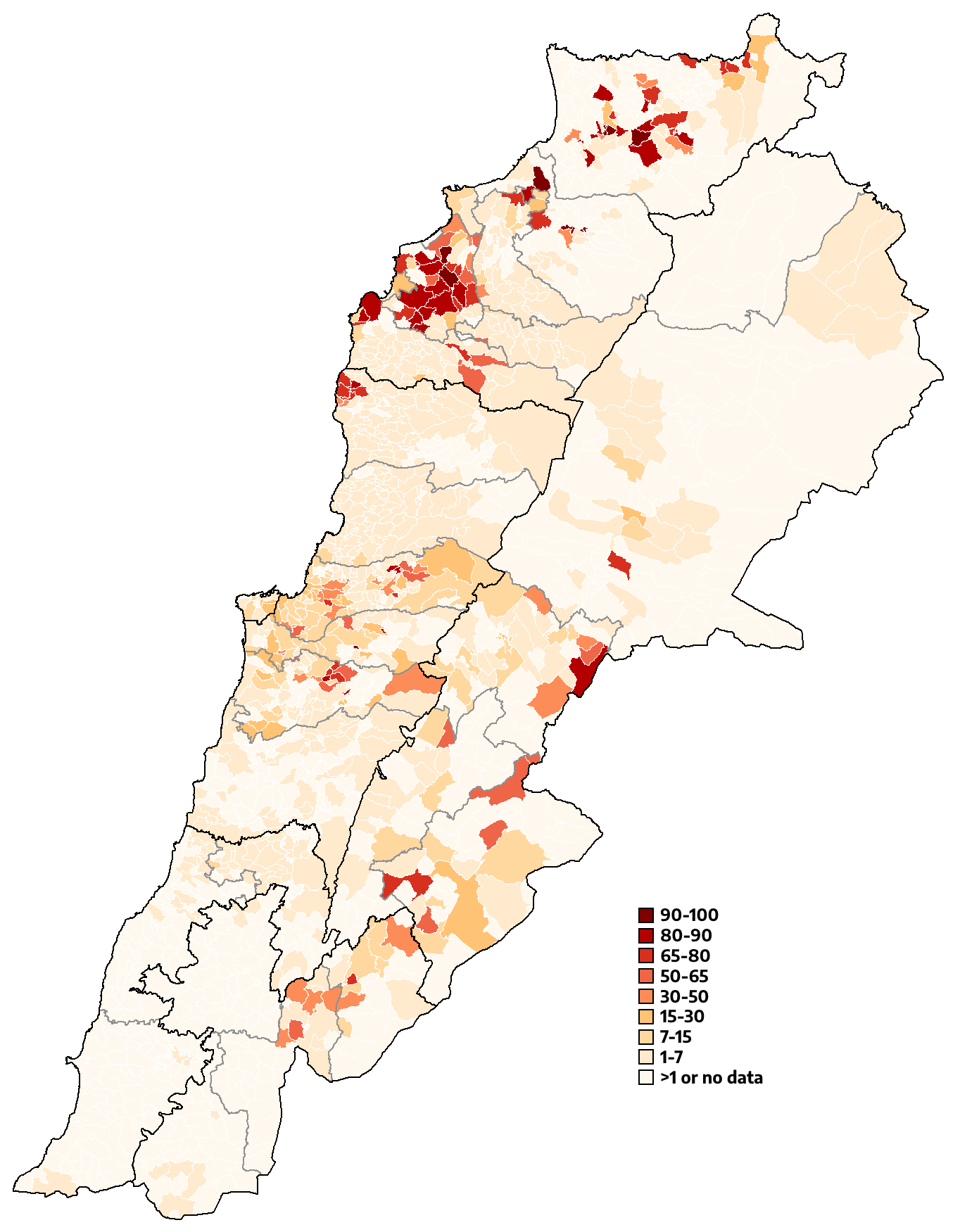
- Distribution of Greek Orthodox Christians in Lebanon

Total population
- 312,725 in Lebanon (2022)

Languages
- Vernacular: Lebanese Arabic; Liturgical: Koine Greek and Arabic

Religion
- Eastern Orthodox Christianity (Patriarchate of Antioch)

Lebanese Greek Orthodox Christians (Arabic: المسيحية الأرثوذكسية الرومية في لبنان) are Lebanese people who follow the Greek Orthodox Church of Antioch in Lebanon, an autocephalous Greek Orthodox Church within the wider communion of the Eastern Orthodox Church. They are the second-largest Christian denomination in Lebanon, after the Maronite Christians.

Lebanese Greek Orthodox Christians are estimated to constitute about 8% of the total population of Lebanon. Most Greek Orthodox Christians live in the capital city of Beirut, the Metn hinterland, the Hasbayya and Rashayya districts in the southeast, and the North Governorate, in the Koura region (south of Tripoli) and Akkar.

Under the consensus of the unwritten agreement known as the National Pact among the political leaders of Lebanon, the Deputy Speaker of the Parliament of Lebanon and the Deputy Prime Minister of Lebanon are assumed to be Greek Orthodox Christians.

== Demographics ==
Year
Year	Greek-Orthodox
2014	7.69%
2022	7.82%

Year	Greek-Orthodox
2014	270 180
2022	312 725
Growth	+42 545
% growth	▲13.60%

Distribution of Lebanese Greek Orthodox Christians in Lebanon
Governorates of Lebanon	2014		2022	
Governorates of Lebanon	Pop.	%	Pop.	%
North Governorate	70 784	12.6%	81 338	12.76%
Mount Lebanon Governorate	60 465	9.33%	72 342	10.16%
Beirut Governorate	45 843	9.82%	46 908	8.87%
Akkar Governorate	36 798	14.29%	41 244	13.65%
Beqaa Governorate	31 578	10.5%	34 941	10.16%
Nabatieh Governorate	10 441	2.47%	17 542	3.57%
Keserwan-Jbeil Governorate	7 887	4.64%	7 734	4.22%
South Governorate	3 588	0.91%	5 827	1.26%
Baalbek-Hermel Governorate	2 796	0.96%	4 939	1.49%
Total Lebanese Orthodox population	270 180	7.69%	312 725	7.82%

Repartition of Lebanese Greek Orthodox Christians in Lebanon
Governorates of Lebanon	2014		2022	
Governorates of Lebanon	Pop.	%	Pop.	%
North Governorate	70 784	26.2%	81 338	26.01%
Mount Lebanon Governorate	60 465	22.38%	72 342	23.13%
Beirut Governorate	45 843	16.97%	46 908	15%
Akkar Governorate	36 798	13.62%	41 244	13.19%
Beqaa Governorate	31 578	11.69%	34 941	11.17%
Nabatieh Governorate	10 441	3.86%	17 542	5.61%
Keserwan-Jbeil Governorate	7 887	2.92%	7 734	2.47%
South Governorate	3 588	1.33%	5 827	1.86%
Baalbek-Hermel Governorate	2 796	1.03%	4 939	1.58%
Total Lebanese Orthodox population	270 180	100%	312 725	100%

== History ==
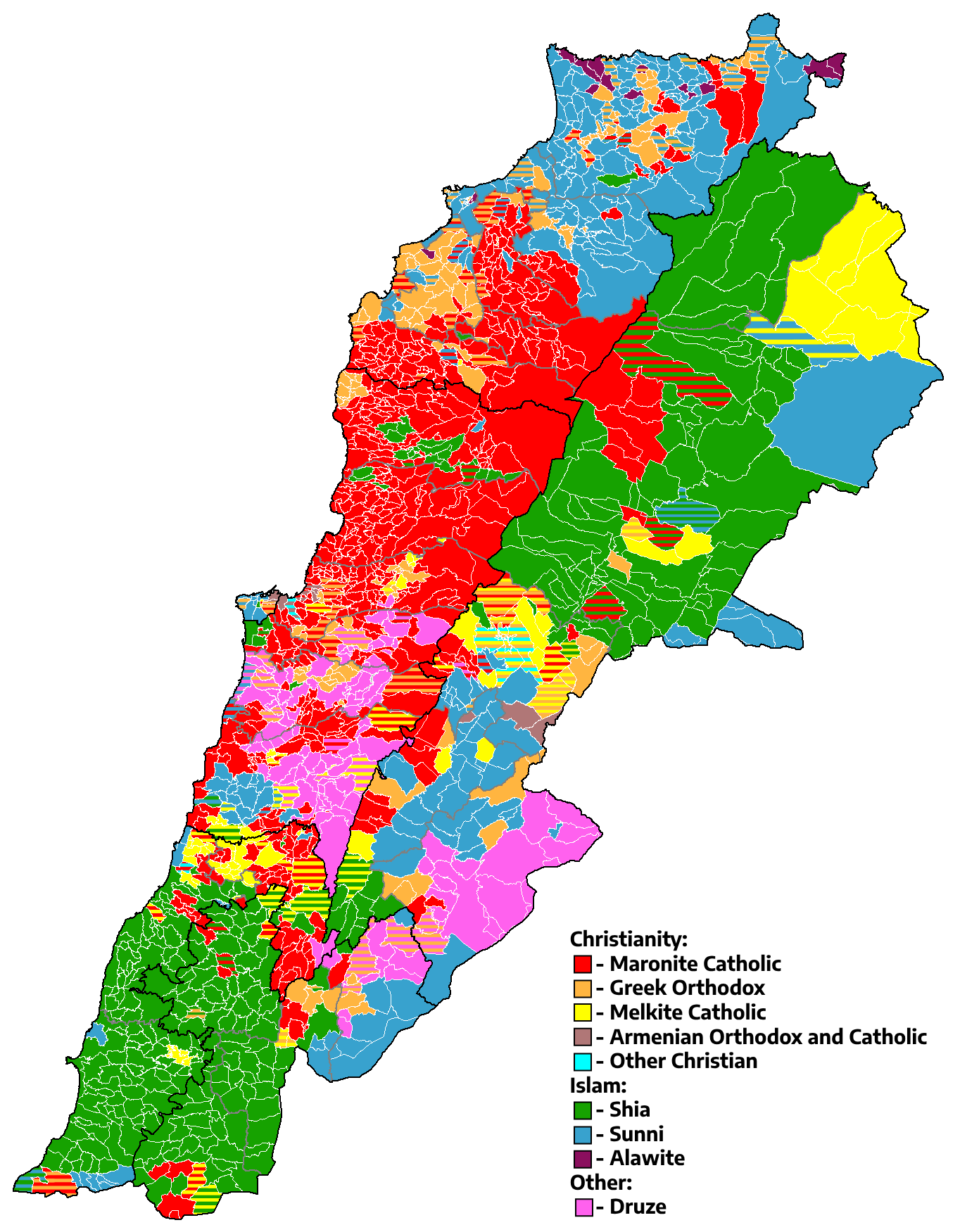
Religion map of Lebanon by municipality according to municipal elections data.

The Greek Orthodox Church of Antioch adheres to the Eastern Orthodox Church, which is composed of several autocephalous jurisdictions united by common doctrine and the use of the Byzantine rite. They constitute the second-largest Christian denomination in Lebanon. Historically, these churches grew out of the four Eastern Patriarchates (Jerusalem, Antioch, Alexandria, and Constantinople) of the original five major episcopal sees (the Pentarchy) of the Roman Empire, which included Rome. The final split between Rome and the Eastern Churches, which came to oppose the views and claims of the Popes of Rome, took place in 1054. Since then, the Eastern Churches have continued to reject the claims of the Catholic Church to universal supremacy and the concept of papal infallibility. Doctrinally, the main point at issue between the Eastern and Western Churches is the procession of the Holy Spirit; there are also divergences in ritual and discipline.

The Greek Orthodox include many freeholders, and the community is less dominated by large landowners than other Christian denominations. In present-day Lebanon, Eastern Orthodox Christians have become increasingly urbanized and form a major part of the commercial and professional class in Beirut and other cities. Many are found in the southeast (Nabatieh and Beqaa) and North, near Tripoli. They are highly educated and well-versed in finance. The Greek Orthodox Church has become known in the Arab world, possibly because it exists in various parts of the region. It has often served as a bridge between Lebanese Christians and other Arab countries.

Lebanese Greek Orthodox Christians have a long and continuous association with Eastern Orthodox Churches in European countries such as Greece, Georgia, Cyprus, Russia, Ukraine, Bulgaria, Serbia, and Romania. The church exists in many parts of the Arab world, and Greek Orthodox Christians have often been noted for this; historically, it has had fewer dealings with Western countries than the Maronite Church, but it does maintain strong connections with Russia and Greece. Lebanese Greek Orthodox Christians are believed to constitute about 8% of the total population of Lebanon, including the Palestinian Greek Orthodox community, many of whom have been granted Lebanese citizenship.

Greek Orthodox Christians support a variety of political parties and factions, including non-sectarian parties such as the Syrian Social Nationalist Party, the Lebanese Communist Party, and the Democratic Left Movement; as well as Christian parties such as the Free Patriotic Movement, the Marada Movement, the Lebanese Forces, and the Kataeb.

== Greek Orthodox Christian settlements ==
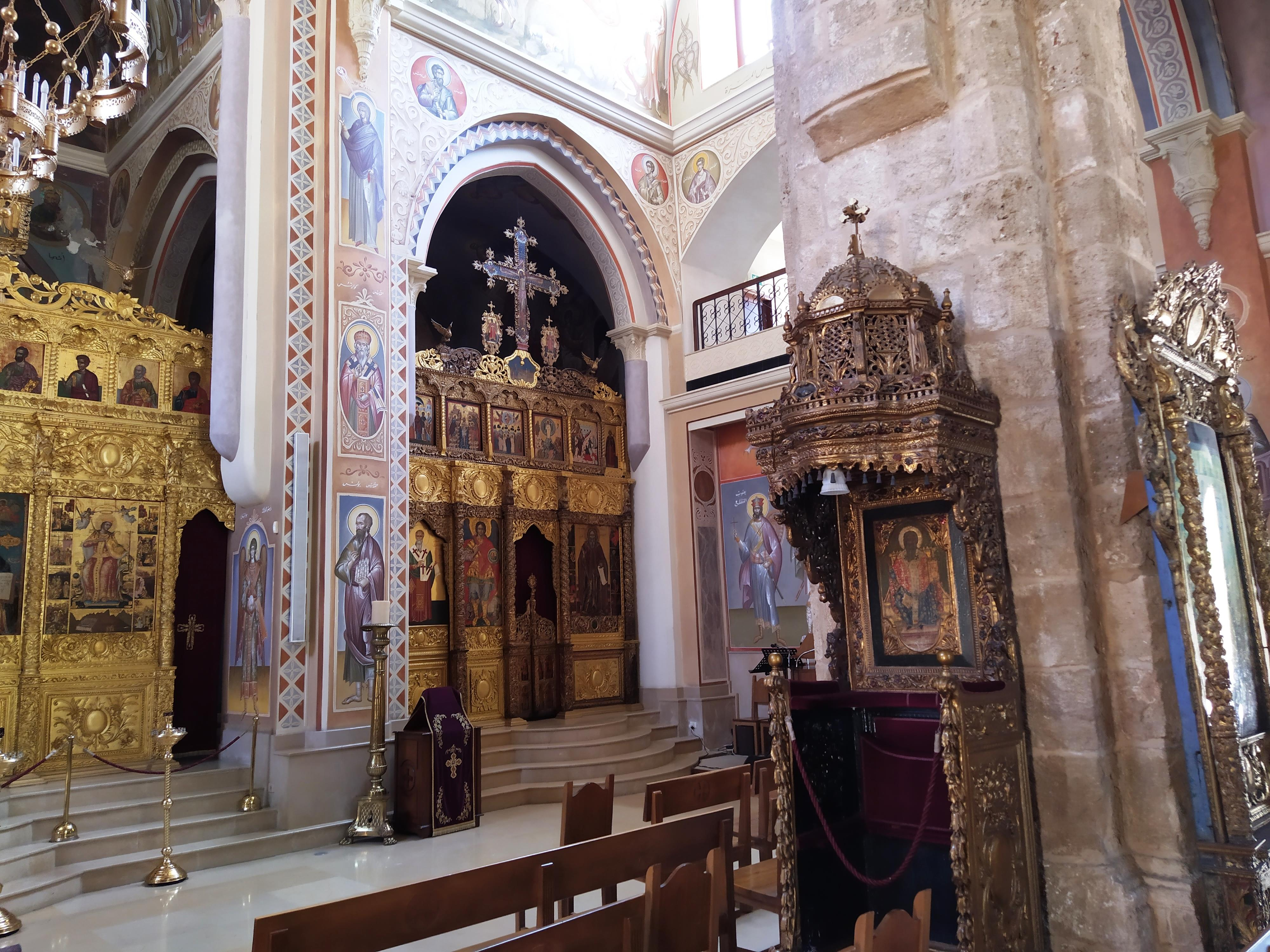
Interior of St. George Greek Orthodox Cathedral in Beirut, Lebanon

In Lebanon, Greek Orthodox Christians are primarily found in Beirut, as well as in the southeast (including Nabatieh and Beqaa) and the North, particularly around Tripoli and the Koura. They are also present in districts such as Akkar, Batroun, Matn, Aley, Zahlé, Miniyeh-Danniyeh, Hasbaya, Baabda, Marjeyoun, Tripoli, Rashaya, Byblos, and Zgharta.

=== Cities and towns with a majority Greek Orthodox population in Lebanon ===
Achrafieh, Amioun, Rahbeh, Kousba, Anfeh, Deddeh, Kfaraakka, Aaba, Afsdik, Bdebba, Batroumine, Bishmizzine, Btourram, Bkeftine, Bsarma, Btaaboura, Barsa, Charbila, Darchmezzine, Fih, Kaftoun, Kelhat, Kfarhata, Kfarhazir, Kfarsaroun, Ras Maska, Miniara, Cheikh Mohammad, Zawarib, Hamat, Douma, Dhour El Choueir, Bteghrine, Mansourieh, Broummana, Kafarakab, Bhamdoun, Souk El Gharb, Marjayoun, Deir Mimas, Rachaya Al Foukhar, Aita al-Foukhar, Jeddayel, and others.

=== Cities and towns with a significant Greek Orthodox minority ===
Ras Beirut, Tripoli, El Mina, Chekka, Bourj Hammoud, Zahlé, Halba, Batroun, Bikfaya, Baskinta, Antelias, Ras el Matn, Aley, Bechamoun, Machgara, Hasbaya, Kfeir, Niha Bekaa, and others.

Beirut was historically home to several prominent Greek Orthodox Christian families that formed part of the city's high society for centuries, including the Trad, Geday, Fernaine, Rebeiz, Bustros, Sursock, Araman, Fayyad, and Tueini families.

== Lebanese Greek Orthodox–born notable people ==
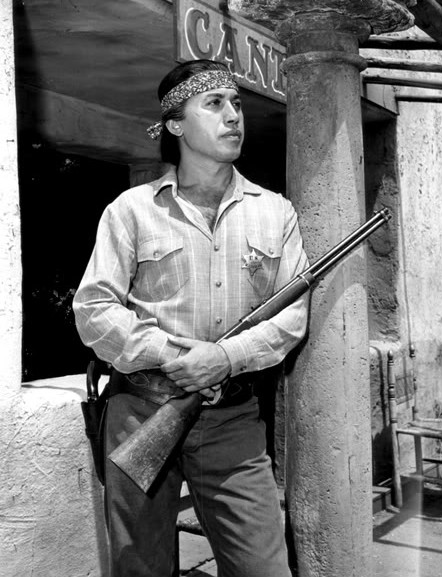
Michael Ansara

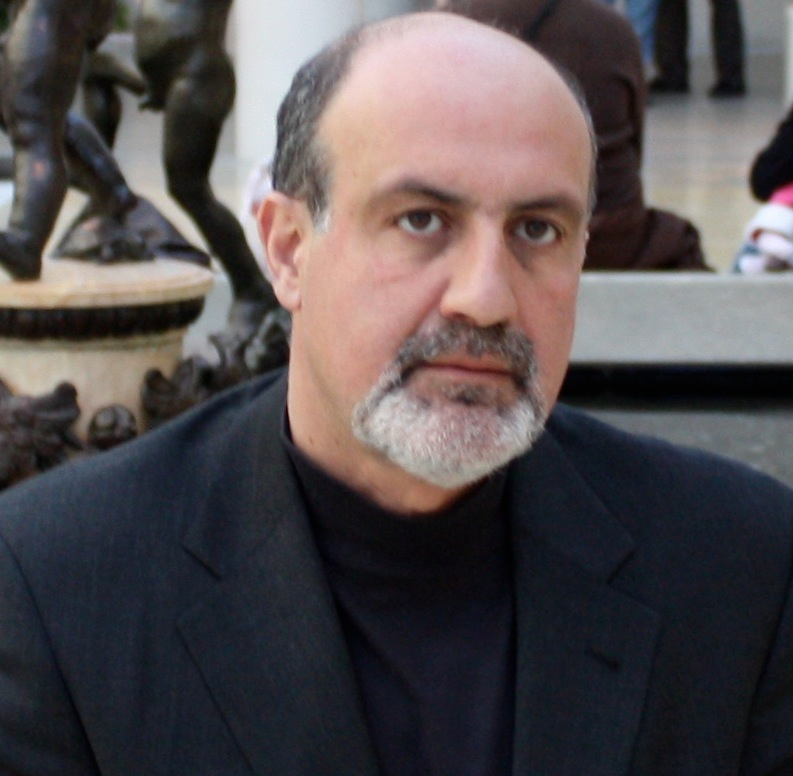
Nassim Nicholas Taleb

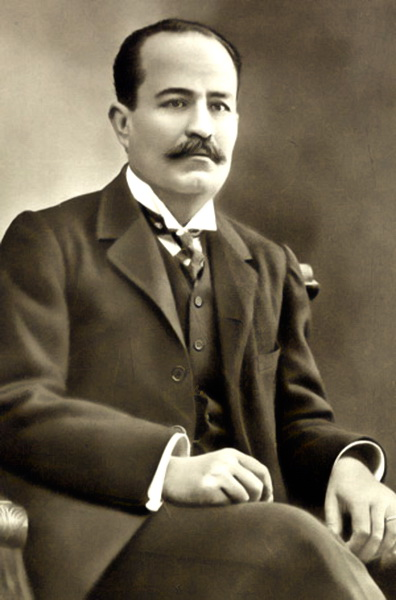
Jurji Zaydan

Charles Debbas

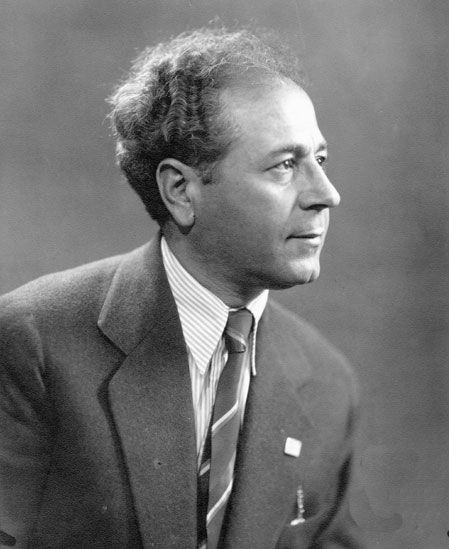
Antun Saadeh

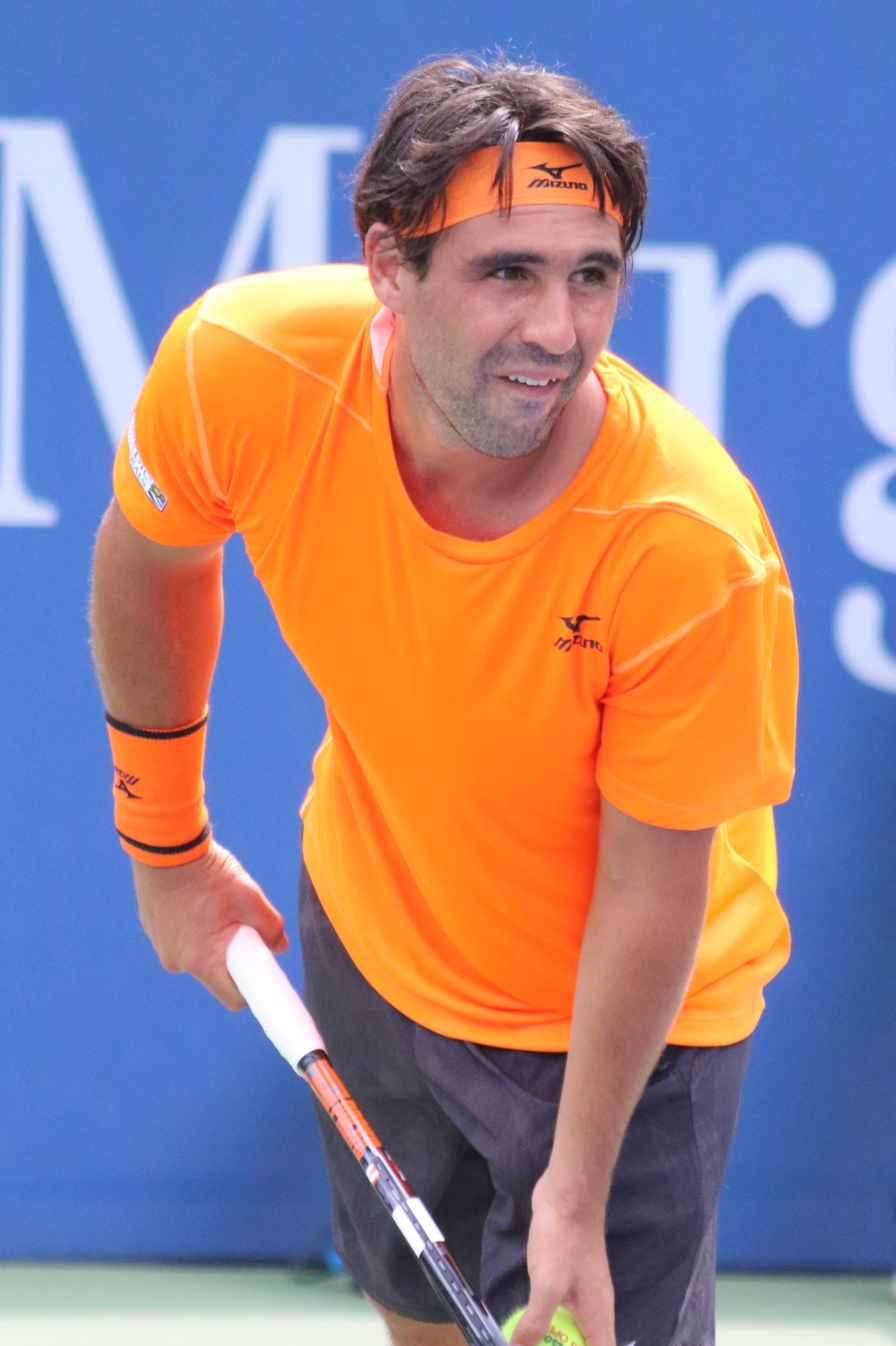
Marcos Baghdatis

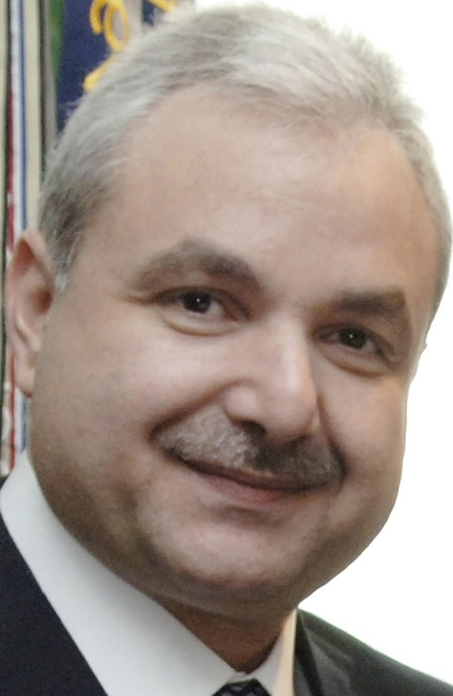
Elias Murr

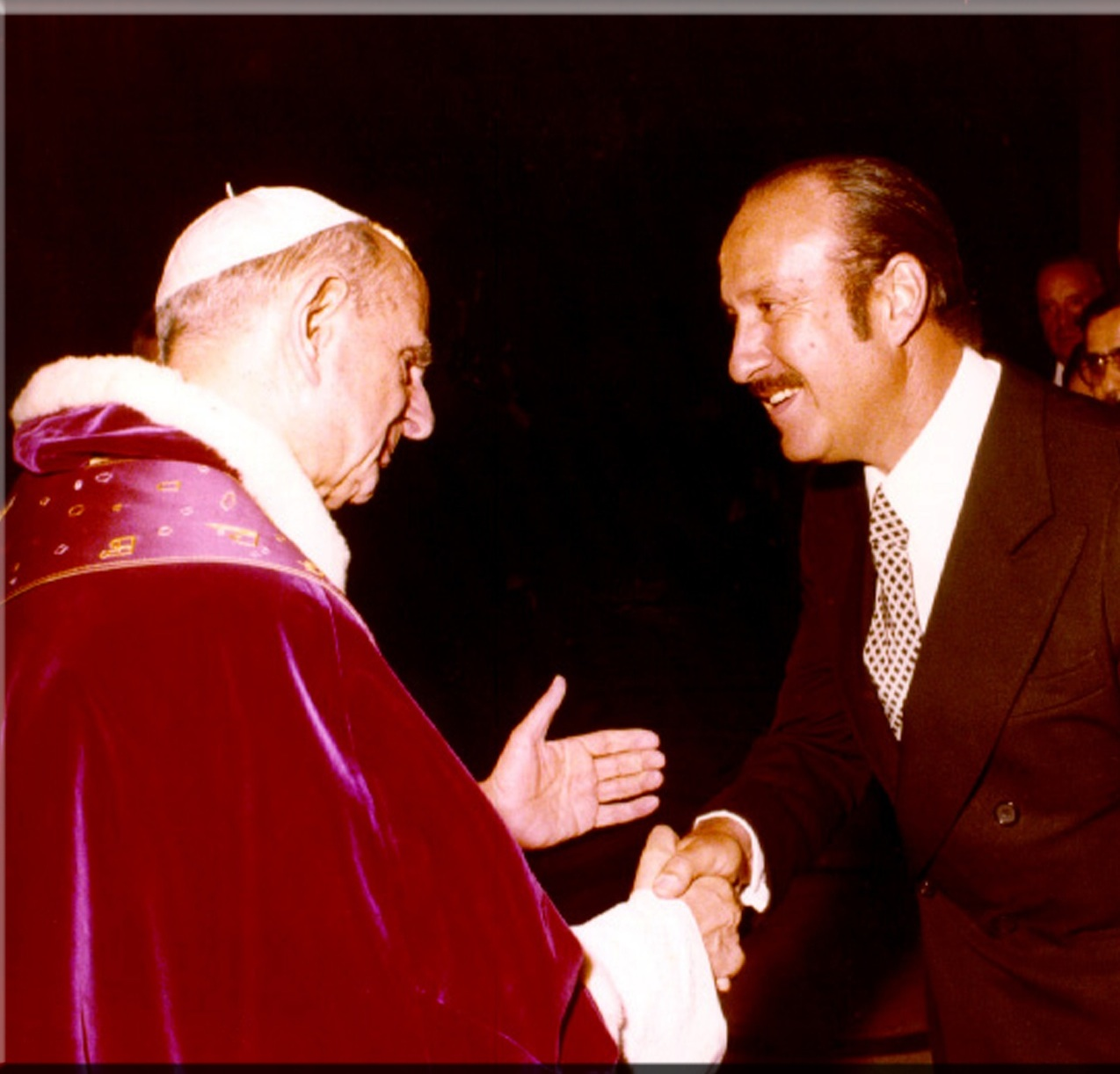
Michel Sassine

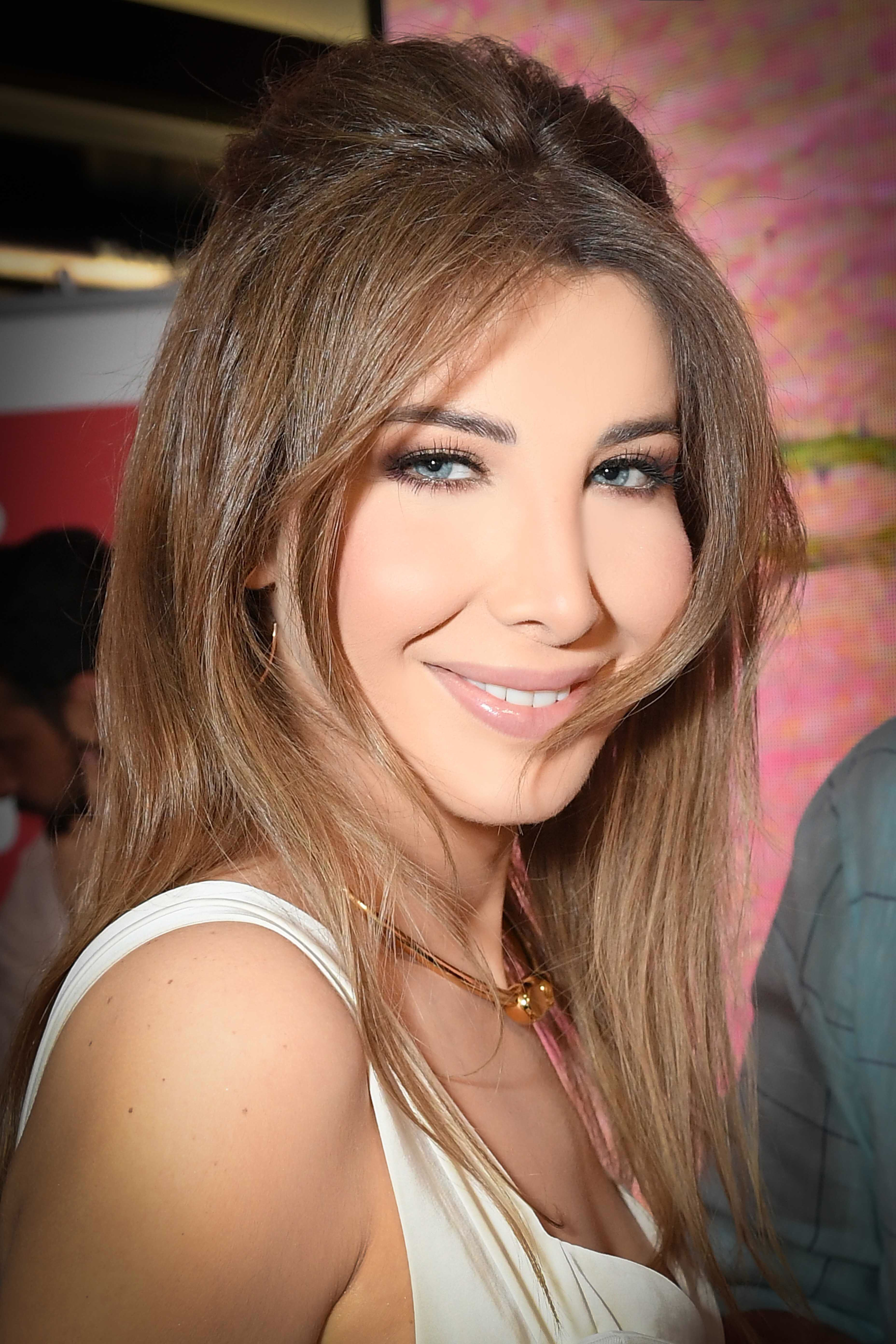
Nancy Ajram

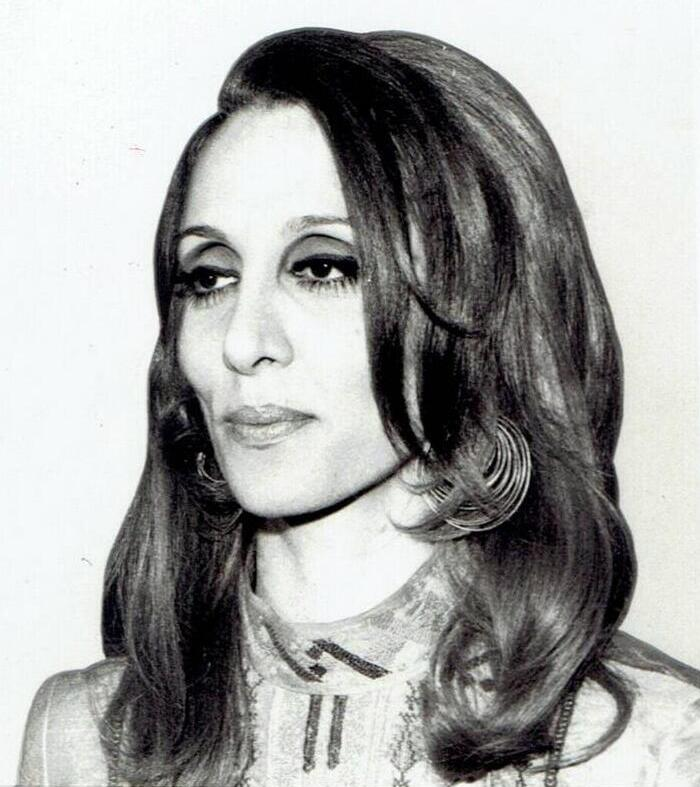
Fairuz

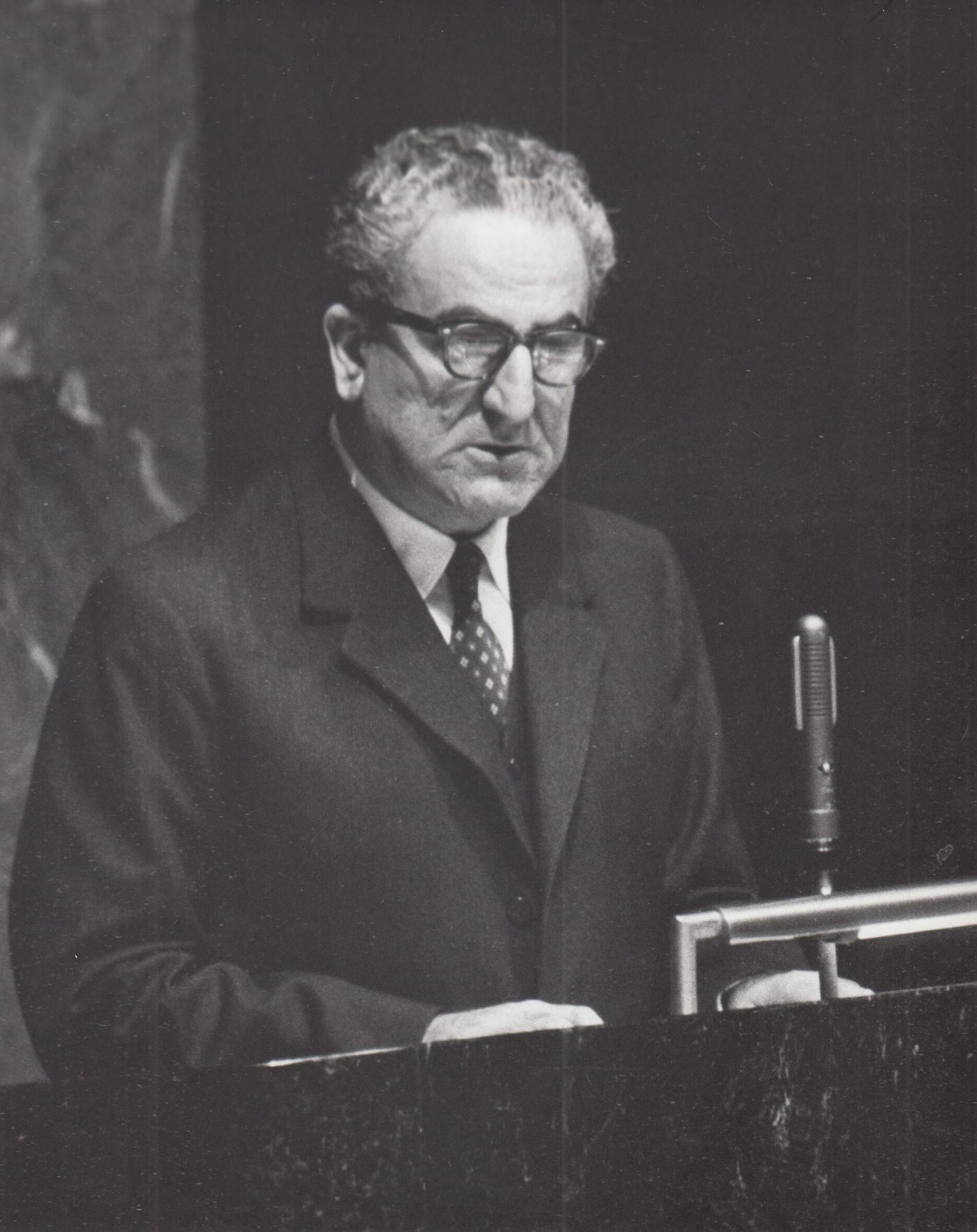
Charles Malik

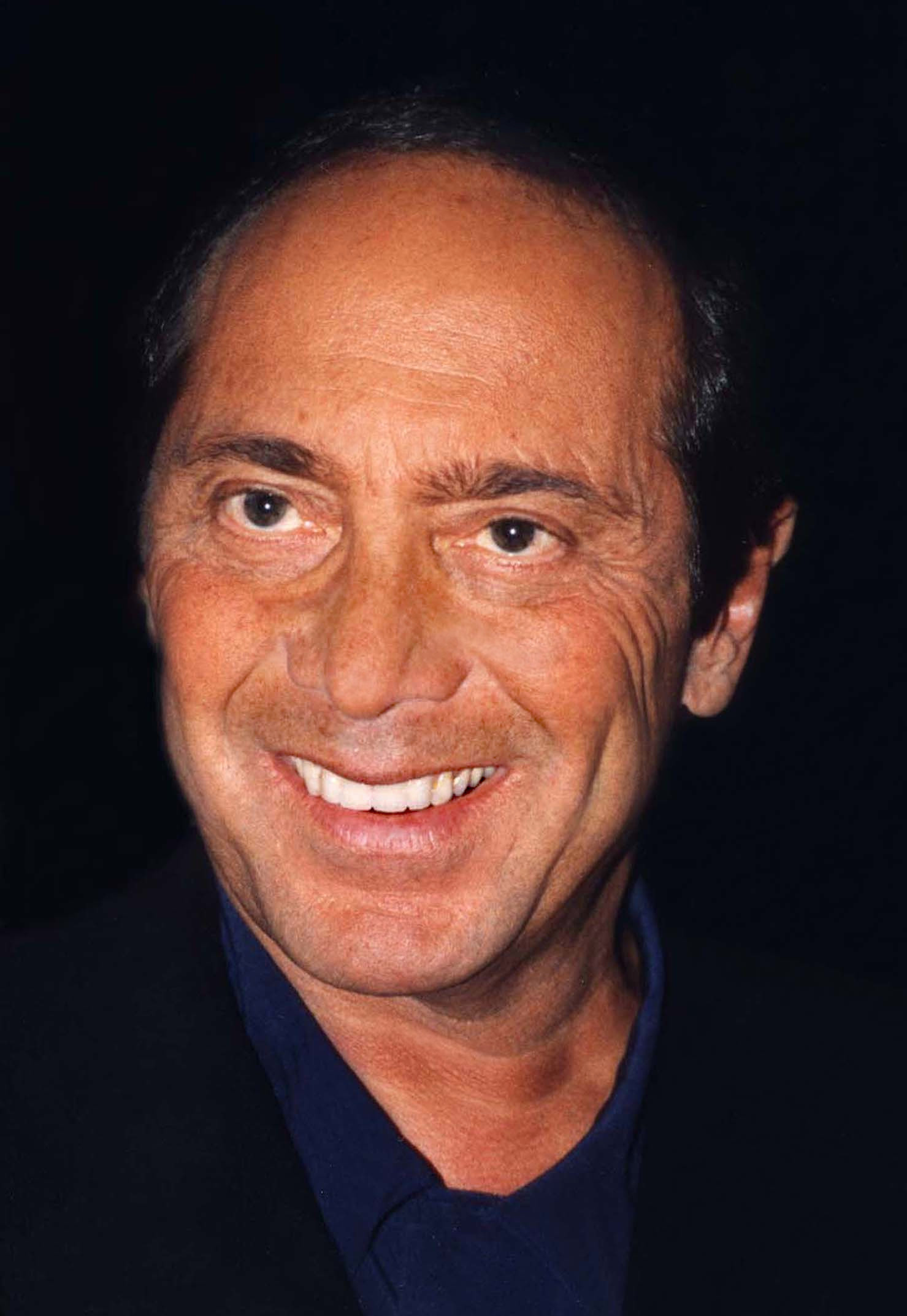
Paul Anka

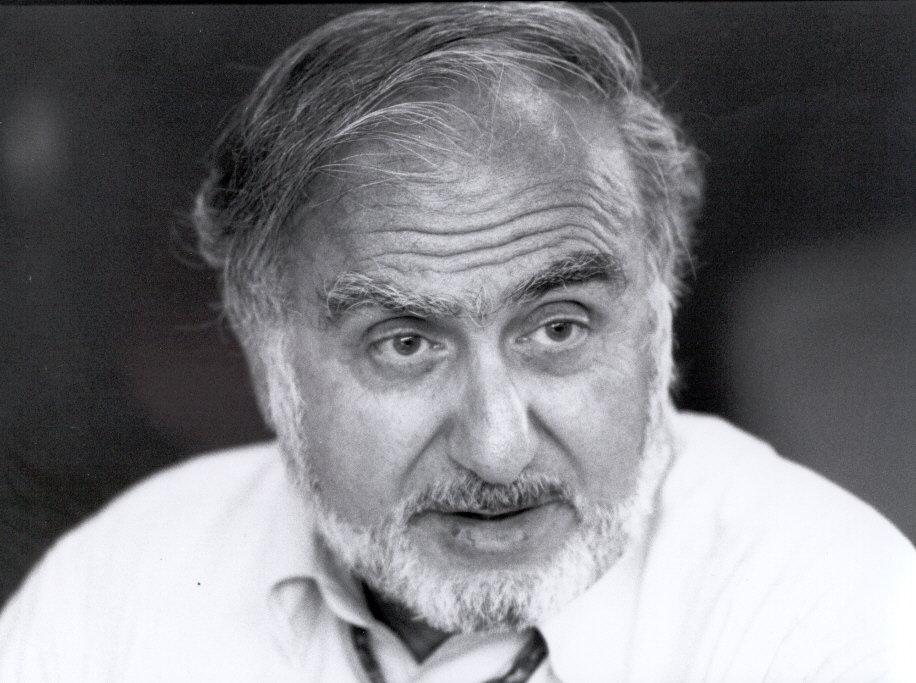
Nicolas Hayek

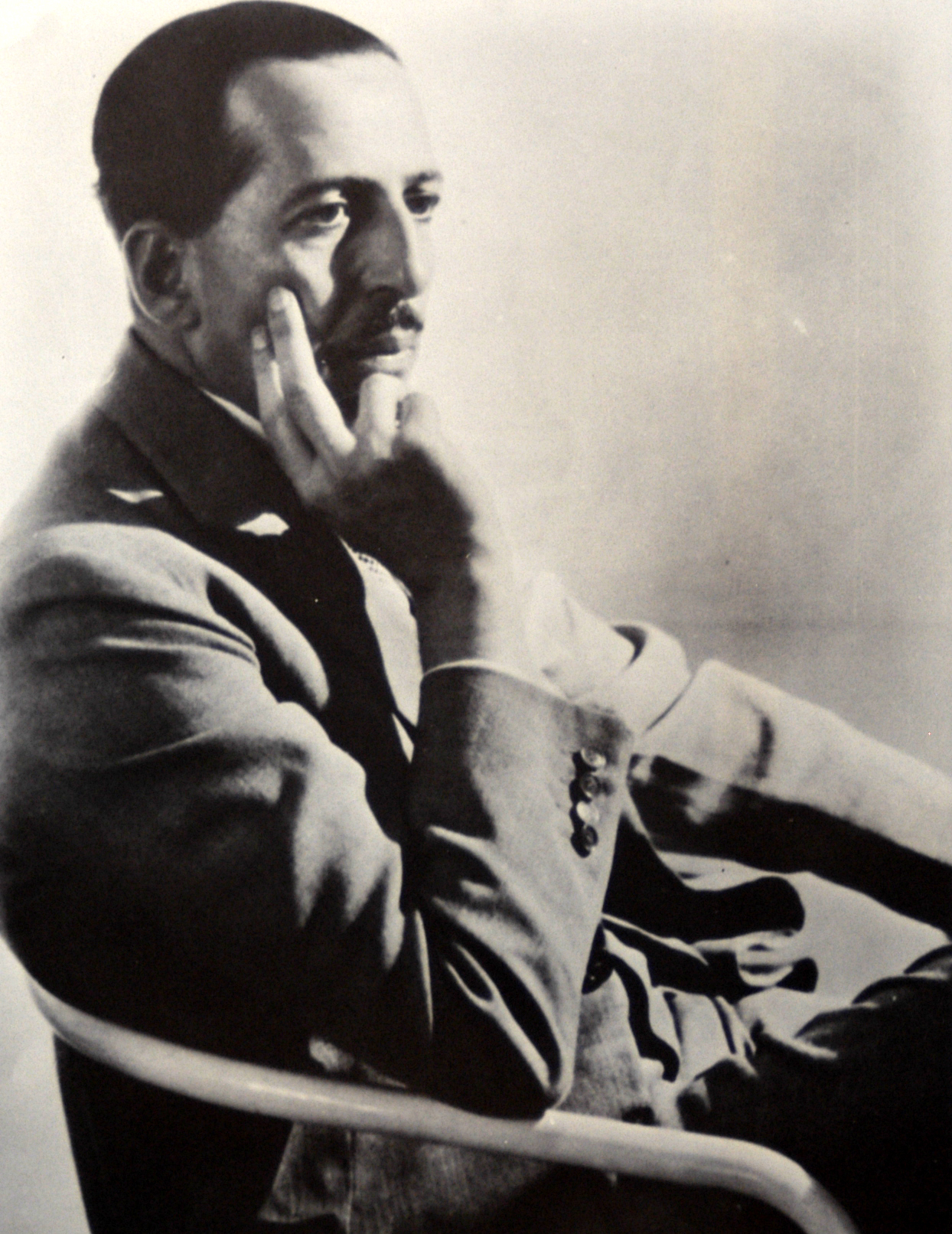
George Antonius

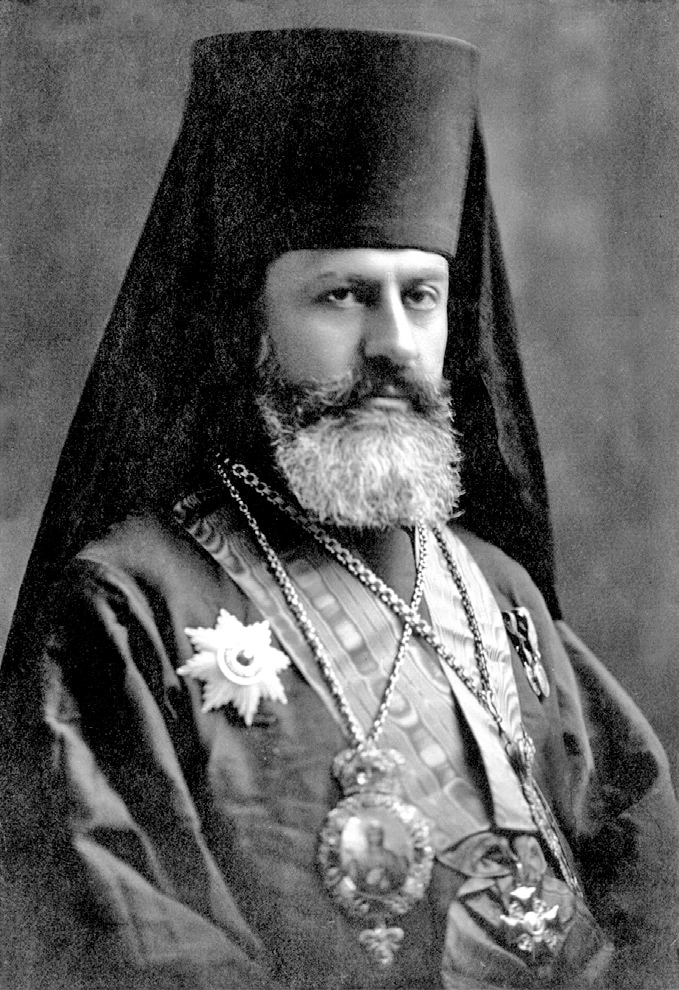
Raphael of Brooklyn

Gebran Tueni

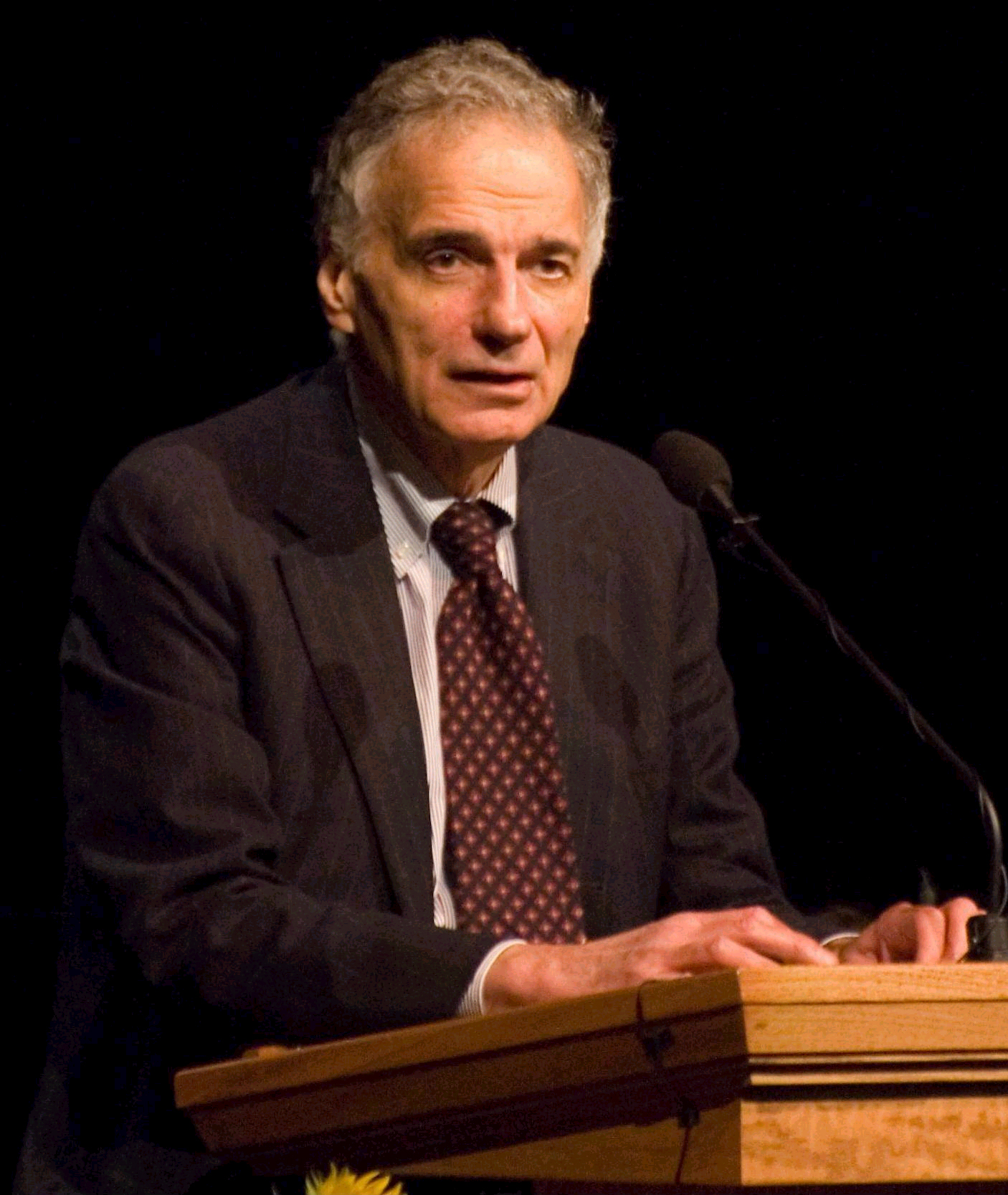
Ralph Nader

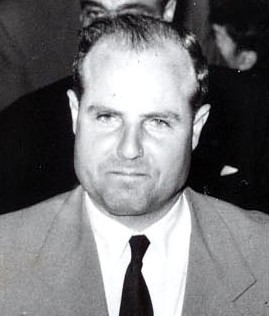
William Hawi

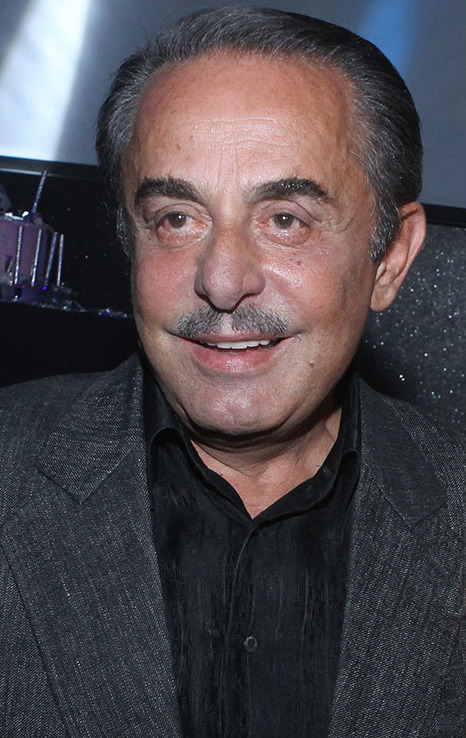
Melhem Barakat

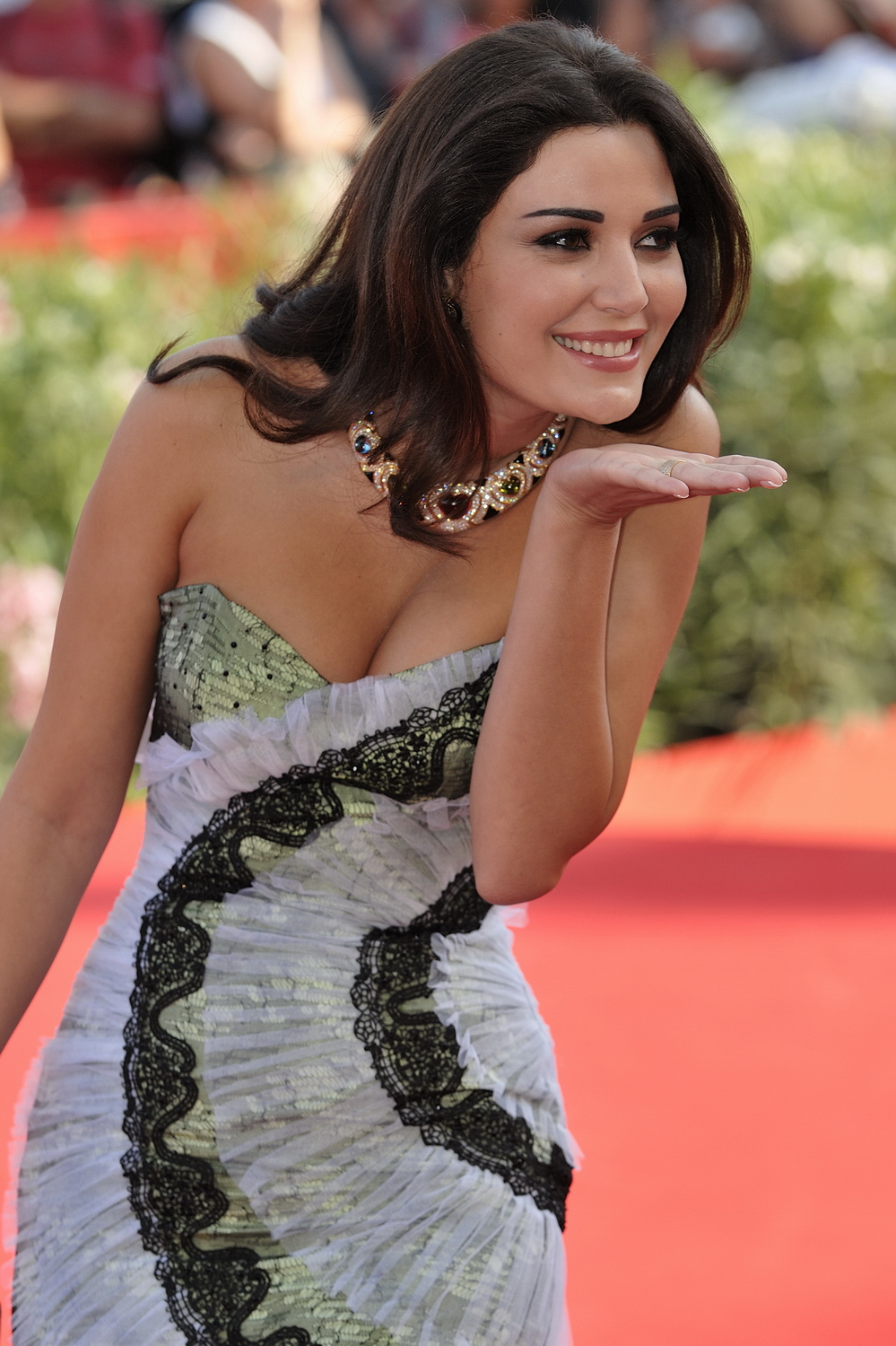
Cyrine Abdelnour

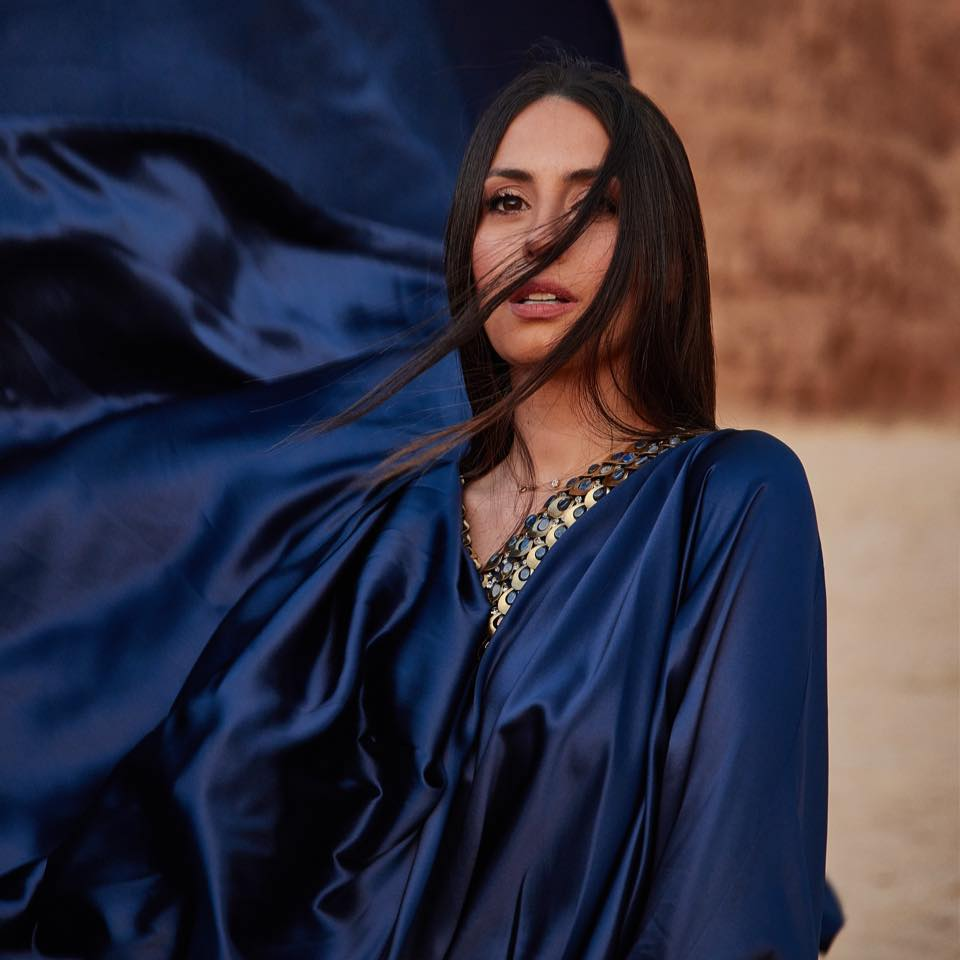
Hiba Tawaji

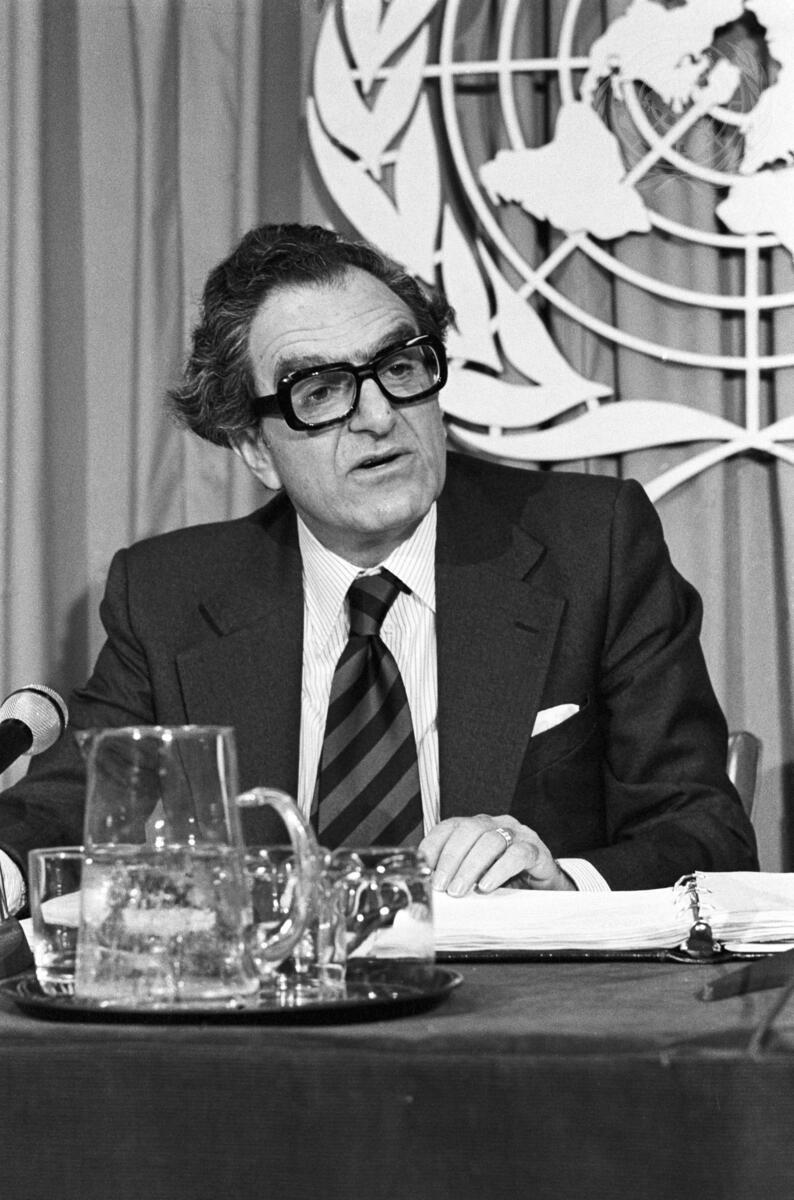
Ghassan Tueni

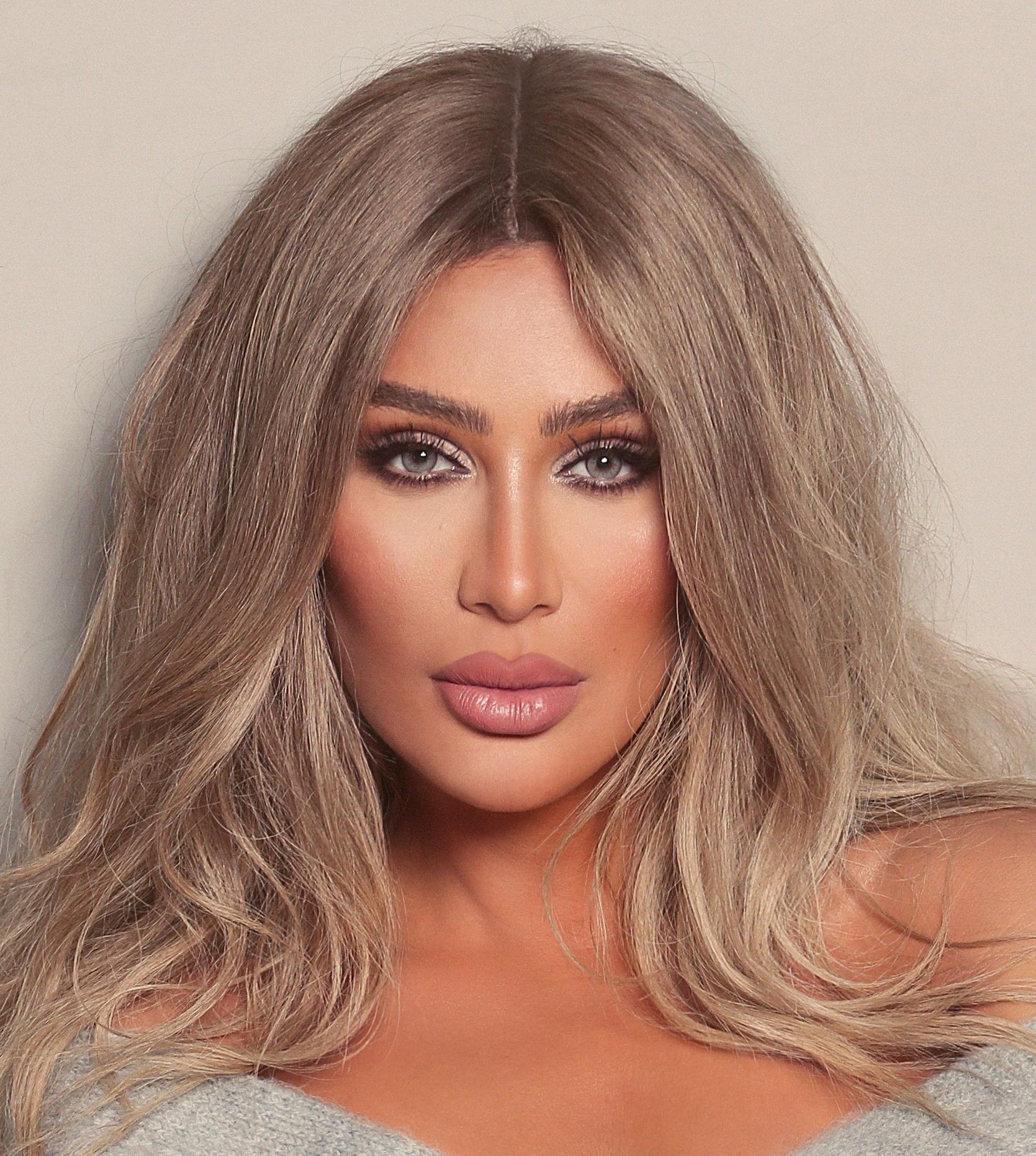
Maya Diab

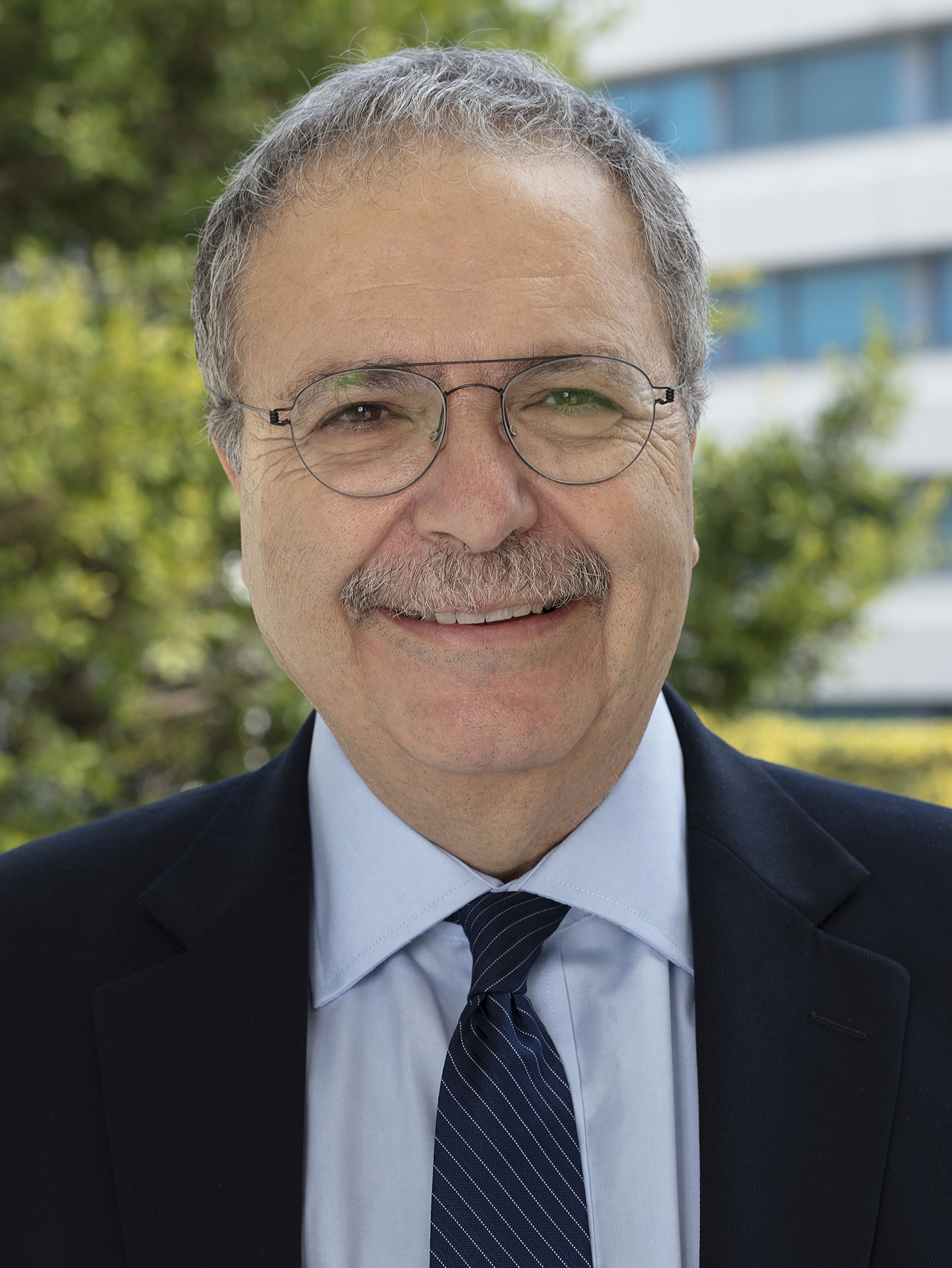
Tarek Mitri

- Cyrine Abdelnour – singer, actress, and model
- Mounir Abou Fadel – former deputy speaker of parliament and member of parliament
- Elia Abu Madi – Lebanese-born American poet
- Nancy Ajram – singer
- Paul Anka – Canadian-American singer, songwriter, and actor
- Michael Ansara – Syrian-American actor
- George Antonius – author and diplomat; pioneering historian of Arab nationalism
- George N. Atiyeh – librarian and scholar
- Karim Azkoul – diplomat and philosopher
- Philip Aziz – Canadian artist
- Marcos Baghdatis – Greek Cypriot tennis player
- Melhem Barakat – singer, composer, and musician
- Souha Bechara – attempted assassin of Major General Antoine Lahad, and member of the Lebanese Communist Party
- Yousef Beidas – banker
- Massad Boulos, Lebanese-born American businessman and diplomat
- Cochrane Sursock – philanthropist and arts advocate in Lebanon
- Charles Debbas – former president (1926–1934)
- Maya Diab – singer, actress, and fashion icon
- Elie Ferzli – lawyer and politician
- Fairuz – singer
- Fawaz Gerges – Lebanese-American professor and author
- Farid Habib – member of the Lebanese Forces party
- Nicolas Hayek – Lebanese-Swiss entrepreneur; co-founder, CEO, and chairman of the Swatch Group
- William Hawi – Lebanese-American commander of the Kataeb Party
- Hiba Tawaji – singer, actress, and director
- Elias Khoury – novelist, playwright, critic, and public intellectual
- Giselle Khoury – Lebanese-French talk show host on Al Arabiya
- Samir Kassir – historian, journalist, and prominent leftist political activist
- Wehbe Katicha – politician and former general in the Lebanese Army
- Jacobo Majluta Azar – former president of the Dominican Republic
- Farid Makari – politician; former Lebanese minister, member of parliament, and deputy speaker of the Lebanese Parliament
- Charles Malik – former president of the United Nations General Assembly and minister of foreign affairs
- Zeina Mina – Olympic athlete and director of the Jeux de la Francophonie; holds a doctorate in sports sciences
- Tarek Mitri – scholar and independent politician
- Samir Mouqbel – deputy prime minister of Lebanon
- Elias Murr – former deputy prime minister
- Michel Murr – former deputy prime minister
- Mikhail Naimy – poet, novelist, and philosopher, known for his spiritual writings, notably The Book of Mirdad
- Ralph Nader – American political activist, author, attorney, and consumer advocate
- Ibrahim Najjar – lawyer and politician
- Octavia Nasr – Lebanese-American journalist covering Middle Eastern affairs
- Mario Nawfal – Lebanese-Australian entrepreneur, business influencer, podcast host, and political commentator
- Mona Ofeich – politician
- Assi Rahbani – composer, musician, and producer
- Mansour Rahbani – composer, pianist, singer, and producer
- Raphael of Brooklyn – first Orthodox bishop consecrated in North America; canonized as a saint in 2000
- Antoun Saadeh – philosopher and founder of the Syrian Social Nationalist Party
- Salim Saade – politician and member of the Syrian Social Nationalist Party
- Michel Sassine – former Lebanese minister, member of parliament, deputy speaker of parliament, and deputy prime minister of Lebanon
- Christina Sawaya – beauty queen
- Nassim Nicholas Taleb – Lebanese-American essayist and scholar focusing on randomness and uncertainty
- Petro Trad – lawyer, politician, and former president of Lebanon (French Mandate period, 1943)
- Gebran Tueni – journalist and figure of the Arab Renaissance
- Ghassan Tueni – journalist, politician, and diplomat; former head of An Nahar
- Nayla Tueni – journalist and politician
- Saint Joseph of Damascus – priest and educator, canonized as a saint in 1993
- Jurji Zaydan – novelist, journalist, editor, and teacher; founder of the magazine Al-Hilal and an early Arab nationalist

== Gallery ==
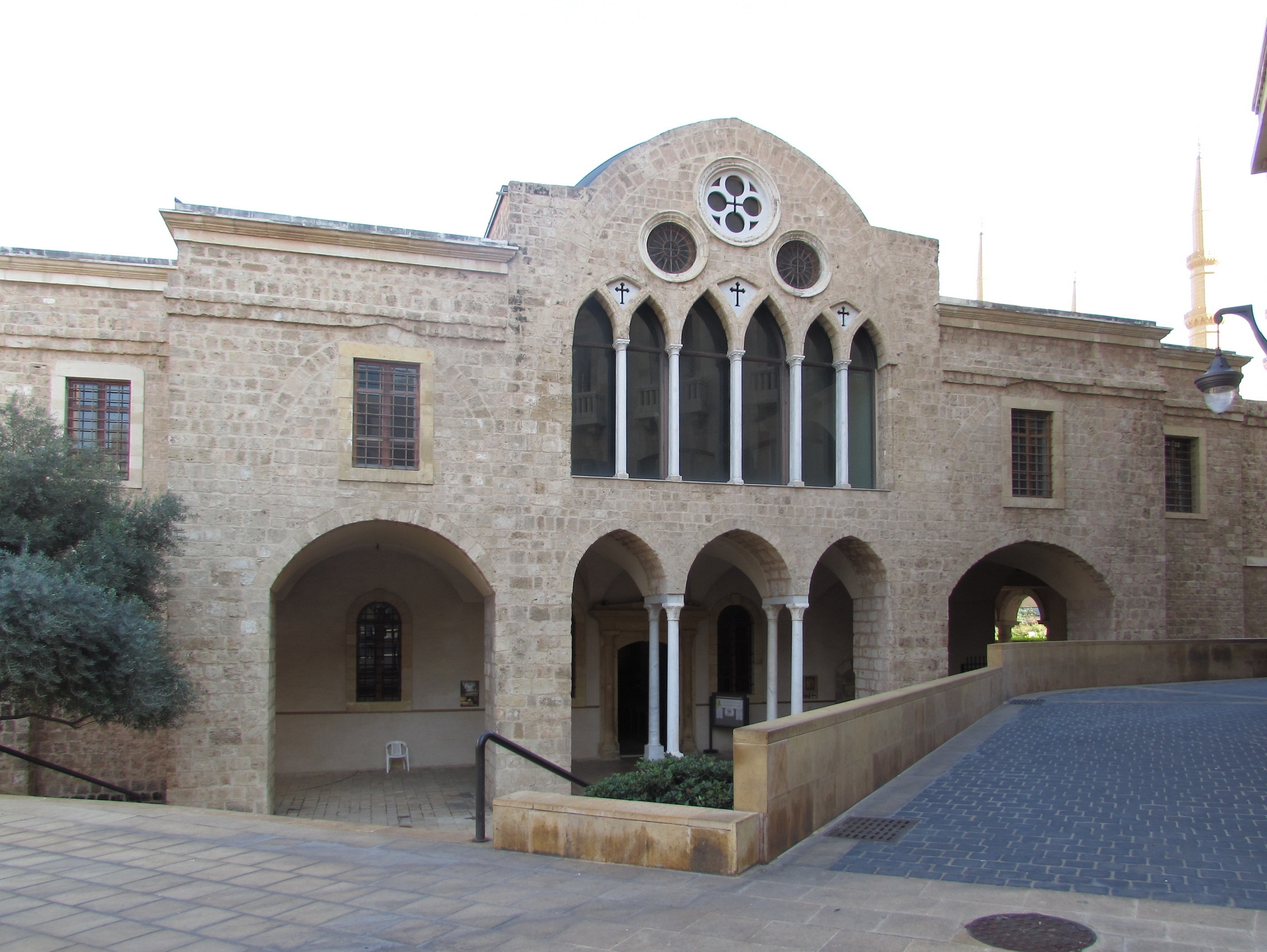
St. George Greek Orthodox Cathedral, Beirut

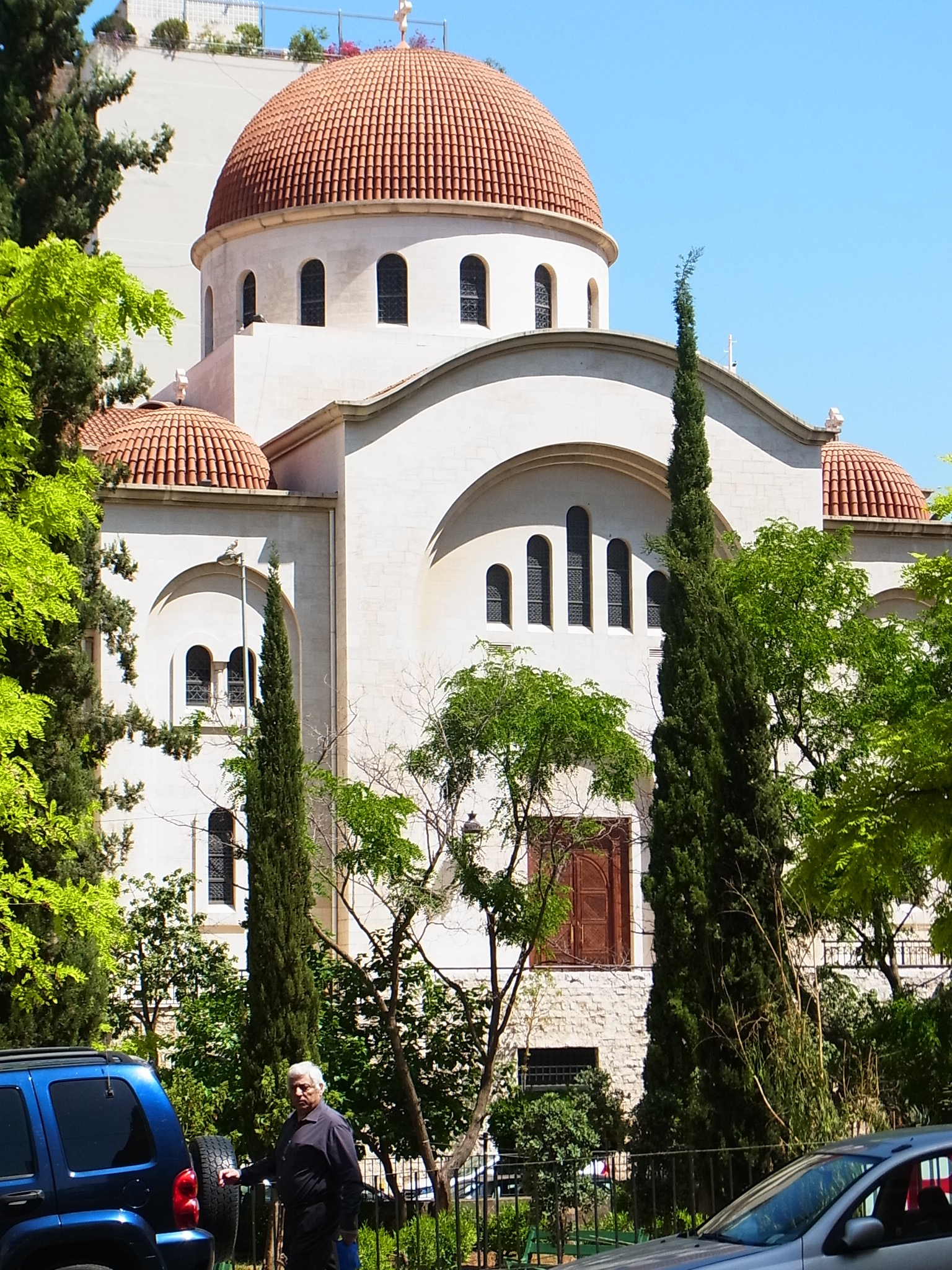
St. Nicholas Greek Orthodox Church, Beirut

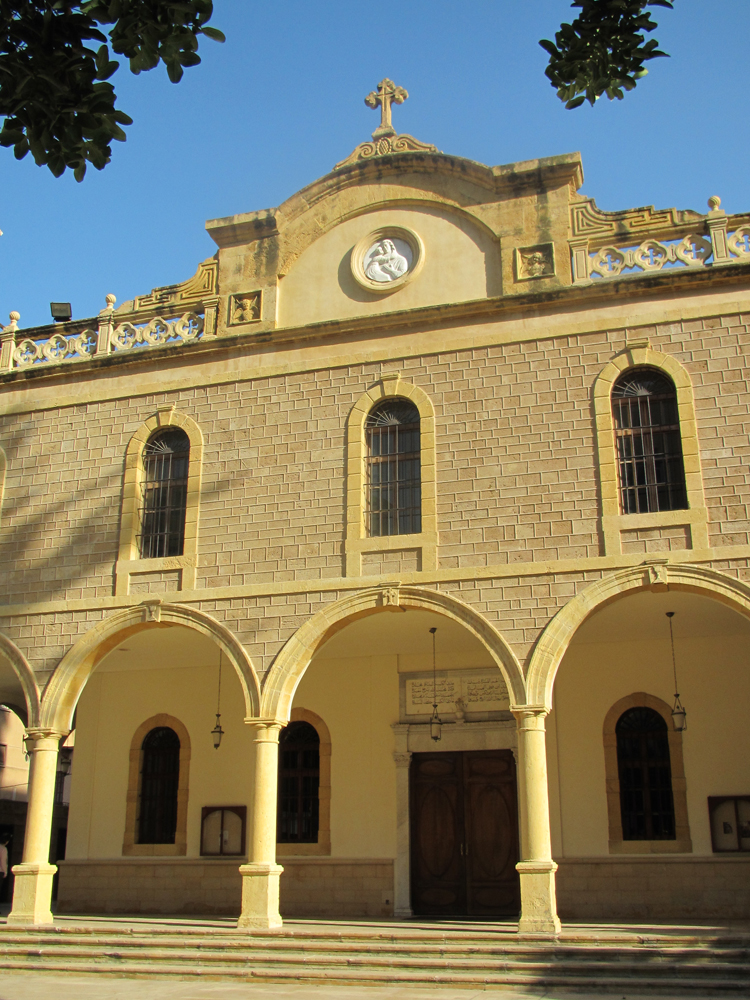
Annunciation Greek Orthodox Church, Achrafieh, Beirut

== See also ==
- Religion in Lebanon
- Christianity in Lebanon
- Greek Orthodox Church of Antioch
- Antiochian Greek Christians
- Greek Orthodox Archdiocese of Beirut
- Saint George Greek Orthodox Cathedral, Beirut
- University of Balamand
- Lebanese Maronite Christians
- Lebanese Protestant Christians
- Eastern Orthodoxy in Jordan
- Eastern Orthodoxy in Syria
- Melkites
- Lebanese Melkite Christians

== Sources ==
- Corbon, Jean (1998). "The Churches of the Middle East: Their Origins and Identity, from their Roots in the Past to their Openness to the Present". Christian Communities in the Arab Middle East: The Challenge of the Future. Oxford: Clarendon Press. pp. 92–110. ISBN 978-0-19-829388-0.
- Dick, Iganatios (2004). Melkites: Greek Orthodox and Greek Catholics of the Patriarchates of Antioch, Alexandria and Jerusalem. Roslindale, MA: Sophia Press. Archived from the original on 8 June 2023.
- Grillmeier, Aloys; Hainthaler, Theresia (2013). Christ in Christian Tradition: The Churches of Jerusalem and Antioch from 451 to 600. Vol. 2/3. Oxford: Oxford University Press. ISBN 978-0-19-921288-0.
- Hohmann, Gregory (2000). "Loyalty to the Emperor and Change of Rite: What Induced the Melkite Church to Exchange the Syrian for the Byzantine Tradition". The Harp. 13: 49–56. doi:10.31826/9781463233013-008. ISBN 9781463233013.
- Labaki, Boutros (1998). "The Christian Communities and the Economic and Social Situation in Lebanon". Christian Communities in the Arab Middle East: The Challenge of the Future. Oxford: Clarendon Press. pp. 222–258. ISBN 978-0-19-829388-0.
- Meyendorff, John (1989). Imperial unity and Christian divisions: The Church 450-680 A.D. Crestwood, NY: St. Vladimir's Seminary Press. ISBN 9780881410563.
- Ostrogorsky, George (1956). History of the Byzantine State. Oxford: Basil Blackwell.
- Panchenko, Constantin A. (2021). Orthodoxy and Islam in the Middle East: The Seventh to the Sixteenth Centuries. Jordanville, NY: Holy Trinity Publications. ISBN 9781942699330.
- Roussos, Sotiris (1998). "Diplomacy and Communal Identity: Greece and the Greek Orthodox in Syria and Lebanon, 1919-1940". Chronos: Revue d'Histoire de l'Université de Balamand. 1: 33–65.
- Roussos, Sotiris (2009). "Diaspora Politics, Ethnicity and the Orthodox Church in the Near East". Journal of Eastern Christian Studies. 61 (1–2): 137–148. doi:10.2143/JECS.61.1.2045833.
- Roussos, Sotiris (2010). "Eastern Orthodox Christianity in the Middle East". Eastern Christianity in the Modern Middle East. London-New York: Routledge. pp. 107–119. ISBN 9781135193713.
- Salibi, Kamal S. (1988). A House of Many Mansions: The History of Lebanon Reconsidered. Berkeley: University of California Press. ISBN 9780520071964.
