= Batroumine =

Village in Koura District, Lebanon

Batroumine بترومين
- Village
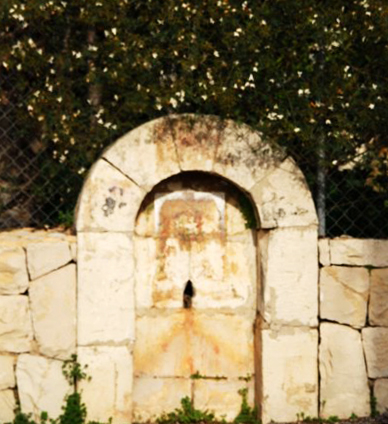

- Location within Lebanon
- Coordinates: 34°21′0″N 35°48′0″E
- Country: Lebanon
- District: Koura District

Area
  - Total: 3.41 km^{2} (1.32 sq mi)
- Elevation: 330 m (1,080 ft)

Population (2009)
  - Total: 1,050
  - Density: 308/km^{2} (798/sq mi)
- Time zone: UTC+2 (EET)
  - Summer (DST): UTC+3 (EEST)
- Dialing code: +961

Batroumine (Arabic: بترومين, romanized: Batrūmīn), also spelled Beitroumine, is a small Greek Orthodox village located in north Lebanon. The village is known too for olives, oil, soap, grapes, wine, arak, figs and blueberries production.

== Geography ==
Batroumine is located in the hilly El-Koura county south east of Tripoli, in northern Lebanon. It lies at an altitude of 324 meters from sea level.

Although Batroumine is located over hills, it would only take 10 minutes to reach the seashore.

== History ==
Batroumine has a long history, that can be seen through the fine examples of traditional Lebanese houses located in the village center. Observation of the preserved architecture shows that the village has roots in the Byzantine period, such roots are strongly noted in the architecture of the church in the village center.

One of the important sites in Batroumine is the "Ain Al-Zarka"; it is an ancient water spring, very famous in Batroumine and its location became a natural attraction nowadays.

== Etymology ==
Historian and language experts, Anis Freiha; wrote in his book A Dictionary of the Names of Towns and Villages in Lebanon that Batroumine could mean the "House of the Nobles", or the Roman Base.

Old men and women in Batroumine told many stories about the origins of this village, which emphasize the explanation Anis Freiha gave. Frayha said that the word "Batroumine" is Syriac and not Arabic, but the inhabitants of Batroumine claim that the name Batroumine is derived from "Bayt Roumine" in Arabic language, which means "The House of Roumine", while "Roumine" was a Roman princess who lived in this village more than 1500 years ago. Whether the origin of the word "Batroumine" is derived from Arabic or Syriac, they both rely on the old Byzantic and Modern Arabic heritage Batroumine has.

== Demographics ==
In 2014, Christians made up 98.91% of registered voters in Batroumine. 91.14% of the voters were Greek Orthodox.

== Archaeology ==
Ruins of the old village were found under the modern Batroumine; around 40 stone houses connected with paved roads going back to the Byzantine era. Archeological researches are ongoing to find more about Batroumine's history.

== Notable people from Batroumine ==
- Bishop Aghanatios Hraiki 1894 - 1969

== Main families ==
- Chikhani (or Shekhani) family
- Dayri (or Dayre) family
- Fakhoury (or Fakhouri) family
- Fayad family
- Ghanem family
- Hanna family
- Hraiki (or Hraiky) family
- Katrib (or Qatrib) family
- Koborssy (or Kobersi) family
- Lakkis (or Laqqis) family
- Mansour family
- Mlayyes (or Melayes) family
- Najjar (or Najar) family
- Daher family
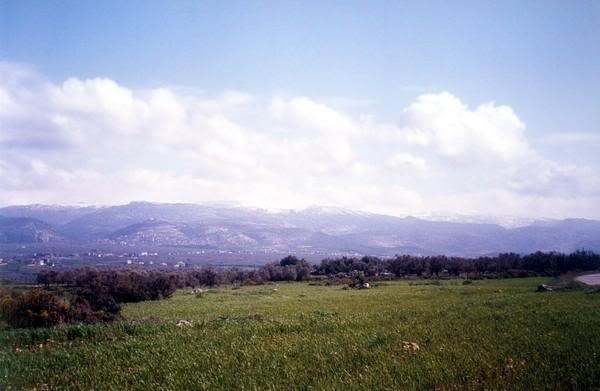
Batroumine green fields

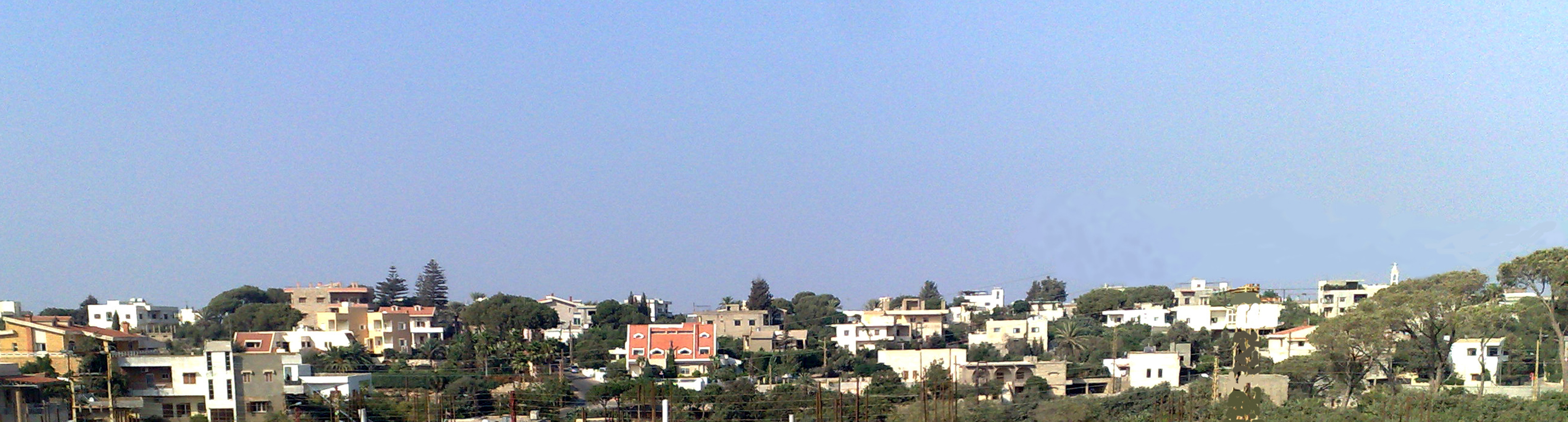
Batroumine houses

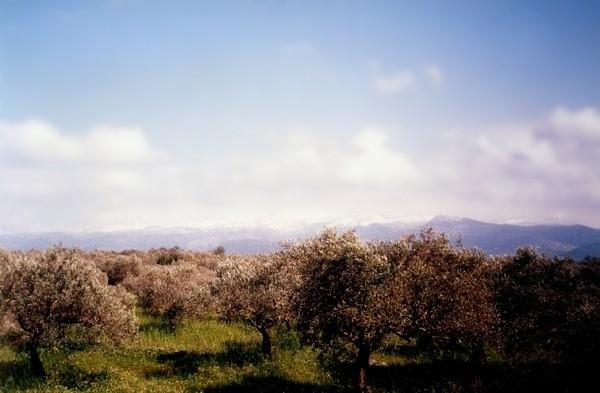
Batroumine olive forests
