= St. Nicholas Antiochian Orthodox Cathedral (Brooklyn) =

Antiochian Orthodox cathedral in Brooklyn, New York

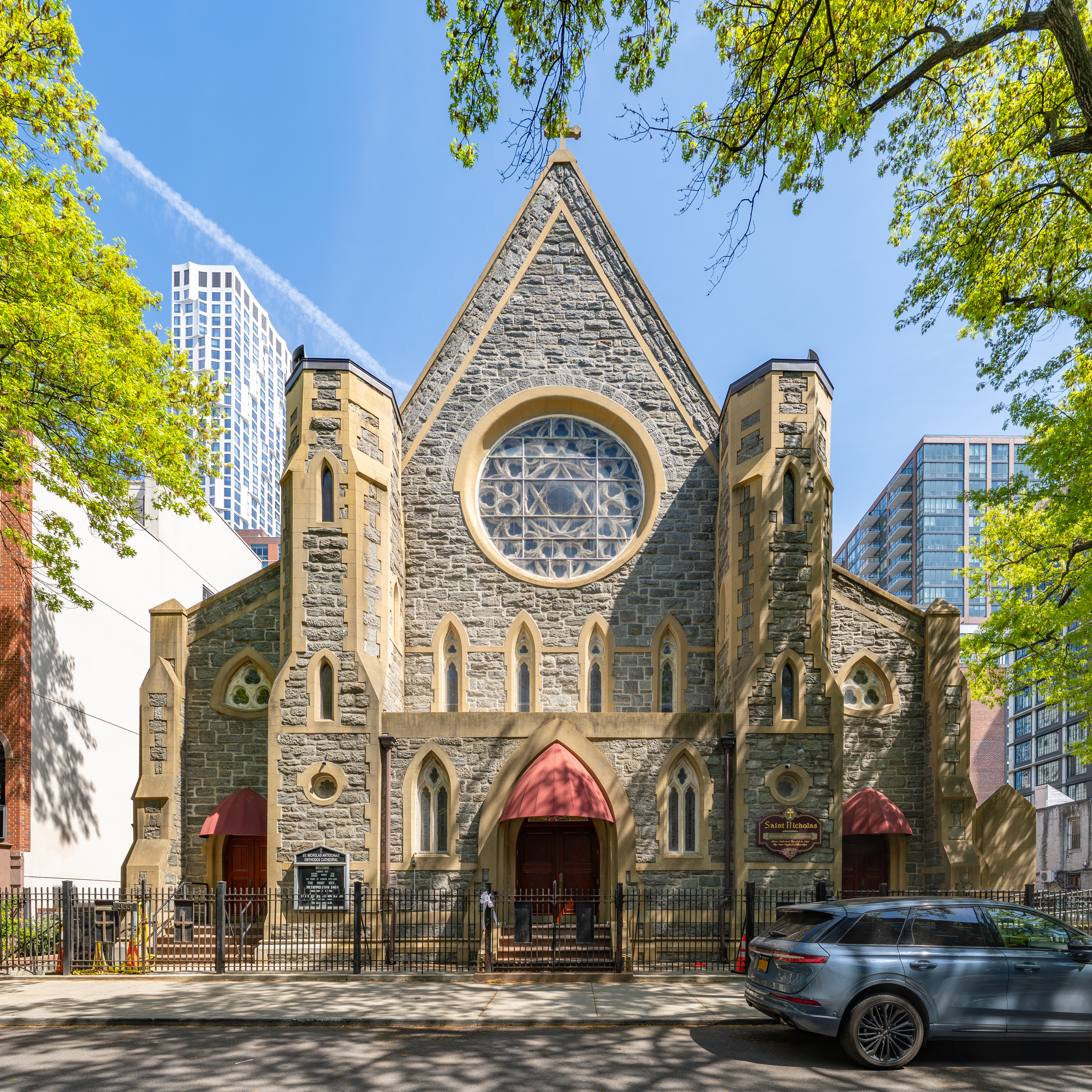
- Antiochian Orthodox Cathedral in Brooklyn
- St. Nicholas Antiochian Orthodox Cathedral
- 40.6879°N 73.9848°W
- Location: 355 State St; Brooklyn, New York
- Country: United States
- Language(s): English, Arabic
- Denomination: Eastern Orthodox
- Website: Official website

History
- Status: Cathedral
- Founded: 1895; 131 years ago
- Founder: Raphael of Brooklyn
- Dedication: Saint Nicholas

Architecture
- Functional status: active

Administration
- Province: Greek Orthodox Patriarchate of Antioch and All the East
- Archdiocese: Antiochian Orthodox Christian Archdiocese of North America

Clergy
- Archbishop: The Most Rev. Metr. Saba (Esber)
- Dean: The Very Rev. Fr. Thomas Zain
- St. Peter’s Protestant Episcopal Church
- U.S. National Register of Historic Places
- New York State Register of Historic Places
- Built: 1870
- NRHP reference No.: 100007102
- NYSRHP No.: 04701.015645

Significant dates
- Added to NRHP: 2020-11-08
- Designated NYSRHP: September 9, 2021

St. Nicholas Antiochian Orthodox Cathedral is a cathedral church of the Greek Orthodox Patriarchate of Antioch in New York City and the seat of the primate of the Antiochian Orthodox Christian Archdiocese of North America. (Note: Newman, Andy (2015-11-05). "A Centennial Celebration for Brooklyn's Only Saint". The New York Times.) First established in Lower Manhattan, it is now located in Brooklyn.

== History ==
The first chapel was established in 1895, by Saint Raphael of Brooklyn at a location on Washington Street in Little Syria, Manhattan. He founded the Syrian Orthodox congregation and then moved it to Brooklyn's Pacific Street in 1902. In 1920, the congregation relocated to a building built in 1870 that was formerly an Episcopal church at 355 State Street in Boerum Hill, Brooklyn.

== See also ==
- Antiochian Greek Christians
