= Mona Ofeich =

Lebanese lawyer and politician

Minister without portfolio
- In office 9 November 2009 – 13 June 2011
- President: Michel Suleiman
- Prime Minister: Saad Hariri

Personal details
- Party: Independent

Mona Ofeich (born c.1943) is a Lebanese lawyer who served as minister of state without portfolio, appointed to her post in November 2009 as part of the cabinet appointed by president Michel Sleiman.

Ofeich was 67 years old on her appointment. Politically unaffiliated, she is of Greek Orthodox background. She became, with finance minister Raya Haffar Al Hassan, one of only two women in the Lebanese cabinet.
