= Zawarib =

Al-Zawarib زواريب
- Location within Lebanon
- Coordinates: 34°31′49″N 36°04′12″E
- Country: Lebanon
- Governorate: Akkar
- District: Akkar

Government
  - Mayor: Georges Matar (Elected 2025)
- Elevation: 200 m (660 ft)

Population
  - Total: 893
- Time zone: +2
  - Summer (DST): +3

Zawarib, Al-Zawarib, Zouarib (Arabic: الزواريب, romanized: az-Zawārīb) is a village in Akkar Governorate, Lebanon, situated on a hill above the Akkar valley and overlooking the Mediterranean Sea. Zawarib is surrounded by the village of Miniara from the South and Sheik Taba from the North.

== History ==
In 1838, Eli Smith noted the village, whose inhabitants were Greek Orthodox, located west of esh-Sheikh Mohammed.

== Social life ==
The village population is around 893 (2026 electoral list). 283 persons voted in the 2009 municipal elections to elect 9 village council members. All the village residents are Christians , with a majority of Greek-Orthodox and a small population of Jehovah's Witnesses.

== Families ==
The major families in Zawarib are: Naddour, Matar, Nader, Farah, Farfour, Saoud, Chahoud, Wehbe, Fakhoury, Habib, Daas, Greige, and Tohme.

== Education and Employment ==
There is a relatively high literacy rate in the village. A few prominent Ph.D. holders, and many with Master’s degrees, especially among the young generation. The most prominent intellectual personality from Zawarib is Dr. Suheil Farah, a professor in history who was the first foreigner to be granted the highest award of the Russian Academy and a nominee for Nobel Peace Prize in 2018. Other occupations include: Doctors, lawyers, teachers, engineers, and employees in the public sector. Many of the poorly educated youth are enrolled in the Lebanese Army and Internal Security Forces, with many highly ranked officers among them.

== Bibliography ==
- Robinson, E.; Smith, E. (1841). Biblical Researches in Palestine, Mount Sinai and Arabia Petraea: A Journal of Travels in the year 1838. Vol. 3. Boston: Crocker & Brewster.
