= Mario Nawfal =

Lebanese-Australian entrepreneur

- ماريو نوفل
- Born: June 12, 1989 (age 37); Lebanon
- Citizenship: Lebanon; Australia
- Education: Monash University
- Occupations: Entrepreneur; business influencer; podcaster; political commentator
- Website: www.marionawfal.com

Mario Nawfal (Arabic: ماريو نوفل; born June 12, 1989) is a Lebanese-Australian entrepreneur, business influencer, podcast host and political commentator. He founded IBC Group and co-founded NFT Technologies.

== Early life and education ==
Nawfal was born in Lebanon to a Greek Orthodox Christian family. His family moved to Australia when he was six, and he grew up there. He is an Australian citizen and does not hold a residence permit for the United Arab Emirates.

He studied banking and finance at Monash University.

== Career ==
In 2013, Nawfal started Froothie, an online store selling kitchen appliances.

In 2017, he founded International Blockchain Consulting Group (IBC Group). The company sells paid posts by Nawfal on X and "shout-outs" on The Roundtable, and employs about 120 people. In 2020, he co-founded NFT Technologies. In 2021, he stepped down as CEO of IBC Group to focus on NFT Technologies.

He also runs a media company, Citizen Journalism Network, which has around 80 staff, including researchers and ghostwriters.

Nawfal hosts The Roundtable, a streaming show about cryptocurrency.
