= Raphael of Brooklyn =

American saint (1860–1915)

Saint Raphael of Brooklyn
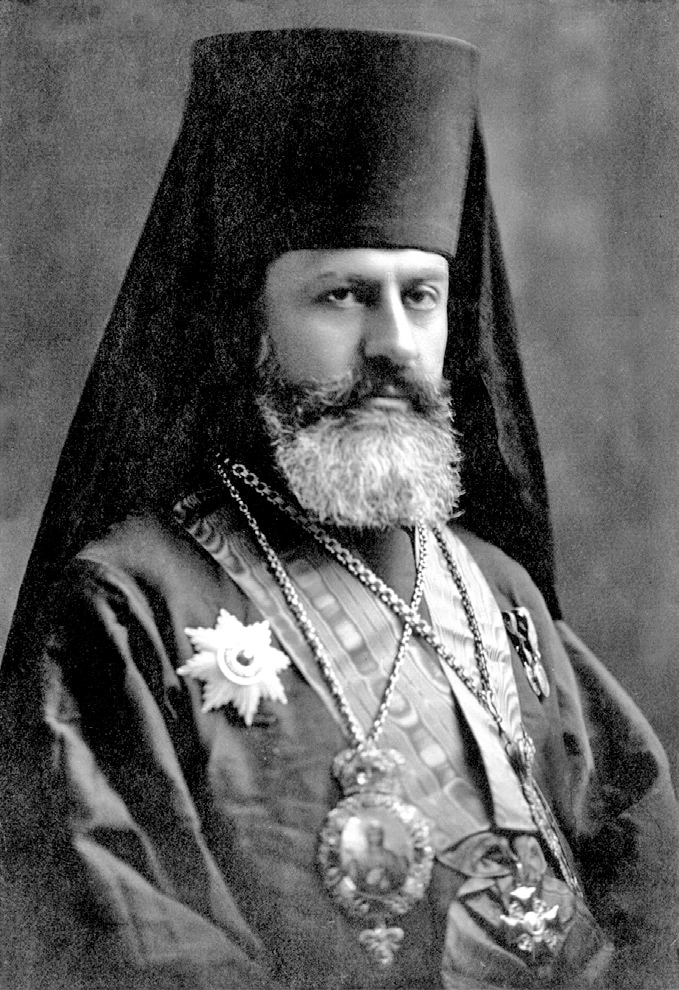
- Undated photograph of Raphael

Bishop, Archimandrite and Vicar of Brooklyn and all America
- Born: Raphael Hawaweeny; November 20, 1860; Beirut, Sidon Eyalet, Ottoman Empire
- Died: February 27, 1915 (aged 54); Brooklyn, New York City
- Venerated in: Eastern Orthodox Church
- Canonized: March 2000 by Orthodox Church in America, October 2023 by Patriarchate of Antioch
- Major shrine: Antiochian Orthodox Cathedral of Brooklyn, Little Syria, Manhattan
- Feast: 27 February (OCA), First Saturday in November (Antiochian)
- Patronage: America
- Influences: Joseph of Damascus, Innocent of Alaska
- Tradition or genre: Orthodox Christian Mission

Raphael of Brooklyn (Arabic: القديس رفائيل من بروكلين, lit. 'āl-Qidīs Rafāʾīl min Brūklīn', born Raphael Hawaweeny; Arabic: رفائيل الهواويني, romanized: Rafāʾīl Hawāwīnī; November 20, 1860 – February 27, 1915), was bishop of the Russian Orthodox Church, auxiliary bishop of Brooklyn, vicar of the Northern-American diocese, and head of the Antiochian Syrian Christian mission. He is best known for having been first Eastern Orthodox bishop of America, for his staunch critiques of ethnophyletism, exclusivism and Greek nepotism in the Eastern Orthodox Church, as well as being precursor to the Arab Orthodox Movement and being among the first to integrate the Eastern Orthodox Church into multimedia with the first-ever published Eastern Orthodox magazine.

== Life ==
He was born in modern-day Lebanon to Damascene Syrian Arab (Antiochian Greek Christian) parents of the Orthodox faith who had come to Beirut fleeing the 1860 Syrian Civil War in Damascus. He was first educated at the Damascus Patriarchal School that had become the leading Greek Orthodox institution of higher learning in the Levant under the leadership of Joseph of Damascus. He furthered his study of Christian theology at the Patriarchal Halki seminary in Constantinople, and at the Theological Academy in Kiev, Russian Empire (now Kyiv, Ukraine). After having been expelled from the Greek Orthodox Church when it was discovered that he had written polemics under a pseudonym against the ethnic exclusivism of the Greek clergy in the church of his day, he was welcomed by the Russian Orthodox Church, where he served as a professor at the Kazan Theological Academy, and was commissioned to write anti-Islamic apologetics.

Afterwards, Father Raphael was sent to New York City in 1895 by Tsar Nicholas II of Russia to administer the local Orthodox Christian community which then included mainly Russian, Greek, Romanian and Arab immigrants, responding specifically to a request by local Arabic-speaking Orthodox Christians for a priest who could minister to them in their own language.

From 1903 onwards, after having been elected the "Syria-Arabian Vicariot of America", he began his notoriously ambitious missionary journey, wherein he adopted a semi-nomadic lifestyle, in which he was known to have travelled by foot, by horse, by donkey and by train among freighthopping tramps and hobos, even having gone so far as to extend his mission to Cuba and the Caribbean towards the end; during his travels, he organized his journey around letters he received from scattered Orthodox Christians in America, and would use them as a guideline for his travels, coming in-and-out of cities to perform spontaneous baptisms, marriages and blessings.

In 1904, he became the first Orthodox bishop to be consecrated in North America; the consecration was performed in New York City by Archbishop Tikhon (Bellavin) and Bishop Innocent (Pustynsky). He served as Bishop of Brooklyn until his death. During the course of his ministry as an auxiliary bishop of the Russian Orthodox Church in America, Raphael founded the present-day St. Nicholas Antiochian Orthodox Cathedral (Brooklyn), established thirty parishes, built over 30 Churches and assisted in the founding of St. Tikhon's Orthodox Monastery.

Bishop Raphael founded the official magazine of the Antiochian Orthodox Archdiocese, The Word, in 1905 in Arabic (الكلمة), and wrote many works of his own, most of which remain both untranslated and unpublished.

== Glorification and honors ==
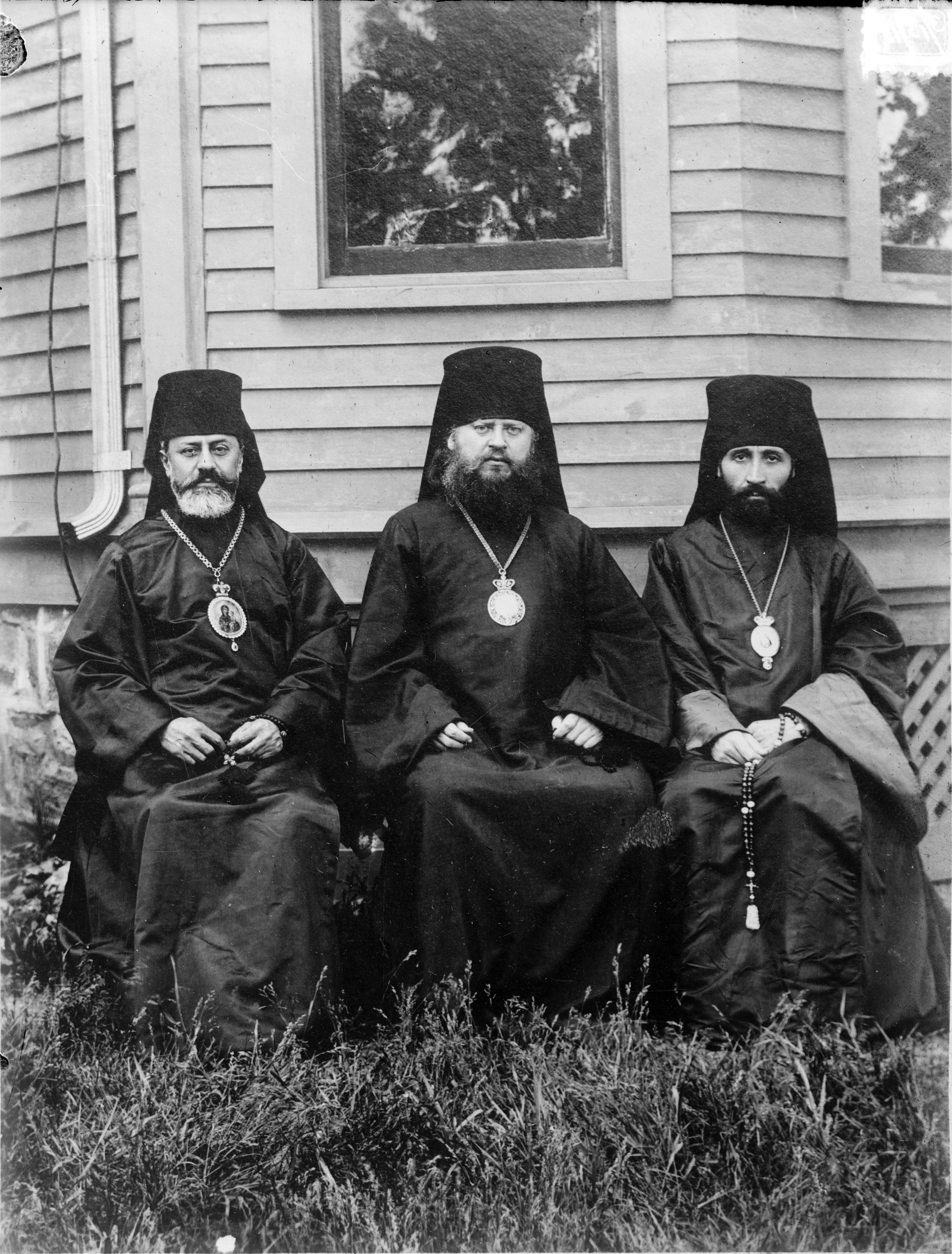
(From left to right) Bishop Raphael of Brooklyn, Metropolitan Platon Rozhdestvensky, and Bishop Alexander Nemolovsky

Bishop Raphael was originally buried in New York until August 1988, when his relics were translated to the Antiochian Village Camp in Ligonier, Pennsylvania, on property of the Antiochian Archdiocese, along with several other bishops and clergy.

Raphael was glorified by the Holy Synod of the Orthodox Church in America (OCA) in its March 2000 session. He is commemorated by the OCA on February 27, the anniversary of his death and by the Antiochian Orthodox Church on the first Saturday of November near the Synaxis of the Archangels Michael, Gabriel, Raphael and all the bodiless powers of heaven. His feast days are both a vigil-rank commemoration.

In 2015, the Antiochian Archdiocese, OCA and ROCOR celebrated the 100th Anniversary of the dormition of St. Raphael.

He is commemorated on 14 February and on 27 October - Synaxis of All Saints of Kiev Theological Academy and Kiev Theological Seminary in Ukrainian Orthodox Church.

== Works ==
- The Antiochian Patriarchal Metochion in Moscow and the Ascension and St. Hypatios Church. 1891.
- Historical Glance at the Brotherhood of the Holy Sepulchre. 1893.
- A Historical view of the errors of the Papal Church. 1895.
- A Brief history of the Christian Church. 1895.
- A Refutation of the Proclamation of Pope Leo XIII. 1895.
- The book of true consolation and the divine prayers. 1898.
- The Resumé of the Church and the Cemetery projects. 1903.
- The Great Euchologion. 1913.
- Truths of the holy Tradition and their great axioms. Al-Kalimat. 1905–1915.
- Rules for the second year. Al-Kalimat. 1905–1915.
- Various others. Al-Kalimat. 1905–1915.

== See also ==
- St. Nicholas Antiochian Orthodox Cathedral (Brooklyn)
- Saint Nicholas Russian Orthodox Cathedral, New York
