= Joseph of Damascus =

Syrian saint (1793–1860)

Saint Joseph the Hieromartyr of Damascus
- Born: May 15, 1793; Beirut
- Died: July 10, 1860 (age 67); Damascus
- Venerated in: Eastern Orthodox Church Melkite Greek Catholic Church
- Canonized: 1993 by Greek Orthodox Church of Antioch
- Feast: July 10

Joseph of Damascus (May 15, 1793 – July 10, 1860), born Joseph George Haddad Firzli (Arabic: جوزيف جورج حداد الفرزلي), was an Orthodox priest and educator who was glorified as a saint in 1993.

He is also known as "Father Joseph" in the Greek Orthodox Church of Antioch.

== Life ==
Joseph was born in Beirut on May 15, 1793. He was the son of George Musa Haddad Firzli, a craftsman who left Beirut during the last quarter of the 18th century and settled in Damascus, where he worked in silk weaving. He described himself as a person of Beiruti origins, whose homeland was Damascus and whose faith was Orthodox. He was ordained a priest in 1817 for the Diocese of Damascus and served as director of the Patriarchal School in Damascus 1836–1860: under his leadership, the Patriarchal School became the leading Orthodox institution of higher learning in the Middle-East. He was martyred during the 1860 Damascus massacre when Druze and Muslim marauders led by Druze feudal lords destroyed part of the old city of Damascus and killed more than 11,000 Greek Orthodox and Melkite Greek Catholic Christians who had taken refuge in the churches and monasteries of Bab Tuma ("Saint Thomas’s Gate").

== Legacy ==
Many alumni of Joseph's Patriarchal School of Theology became bishops and archpriests in Syria, Turkey, Lebanon, the United States and Brazil, most notably Raphael Hawaweeny, known as Raphael of Brooklyn, the first Orthodox Christian bishop consecrated on American soil, and Dom Ignatios Firzli, Greek Orthodox archbishop of São Paulo

== See also ==
- 1860 Lebanon conflict
- Greek Orthodox Church of Antioch
- Massacres of Badr Khan
