= Bakka, Lebanon =

Bakka بكّا Beka, Bekka
- Village
- Interactive map of Bakka
- Country: Lebanon
- Governorate: Beqaa Governorate
- District: Rashaya District

Area
  - Total: 2.36 sq mi (6.12 km^{2})
- Elevation: 4,860 ft (1,480 m)

Aaqbe
- Akbeh, Aqbe, Akbe, Aqbeh
- Location within Lebanon
- 33.593334°N 35.924442°E
- Cultures: Roman
- Location: 85 kilometres (53 mi) east of Beirut
- Region: Rashaya

Site notes
- Condition: Ruins
- Public access: Yes

Bakka, Bekka or Beka (Arabic: بكّا, romanized: Bakkā) is a village and municipality situated 85 kilometres (53 mi) east of Beirut in the Rashaya District of the Beqaa Governorate in Lebanon. The population of the village is Sunni.

== Wadi Bakka ==
The Wadi Bakka or Wadi Bekka runs alongside the village. The wadi was the scene of the Battle of Wadi Bakka where a Druze uprising was put down by Ibrahim Pasha of Egypt during the 1838 Druze revolt.

== Roman temple ==
There are the ruins of a Roman temple in the village that are included in a group of Temples of Mount Hermon. George Taylor classified it as a prostylos temple and noted that the north and south walls remained standing and the podium floor had survived. The site has been heavily damaged by local construction of houses over the site. The temple featured an underground crypt that was accessible via one of the houses that had been built over it.

George Taylor divided up the Temples of Lebanon into three groups, one group of Temples of the Beqaa Valley lies north of the road from Beirut to Damascus. Second, there is the group in the area south of the same road, including the Wadi al-Taym and the western flank of Mount Hermon. Third, the group in the area west of a line drawn along the ridge of Mount Lebanon. There are relatively few temples along Lebanon's coastal plain. The Temples of Mount Hermon in Taylor's second group included Bakka and Ain Harcha, Aaiha, Deir El Aachayer, Dekweh, Yanta, Hebbariye, Ain Libbaya, Nebi Safa, Aaqbe, Khirbet El-Knese, Mejdal Anjar, Mdoukha.

Edward Robinson suggested that word bakka could have derived from the later Arabic meaning of crowd. Others have linked it to the Hebrew word bikha meaning plain.
