= Temples of Mount Hermon =

Roman shrines and temples in Lebanon, Israel, and Syria

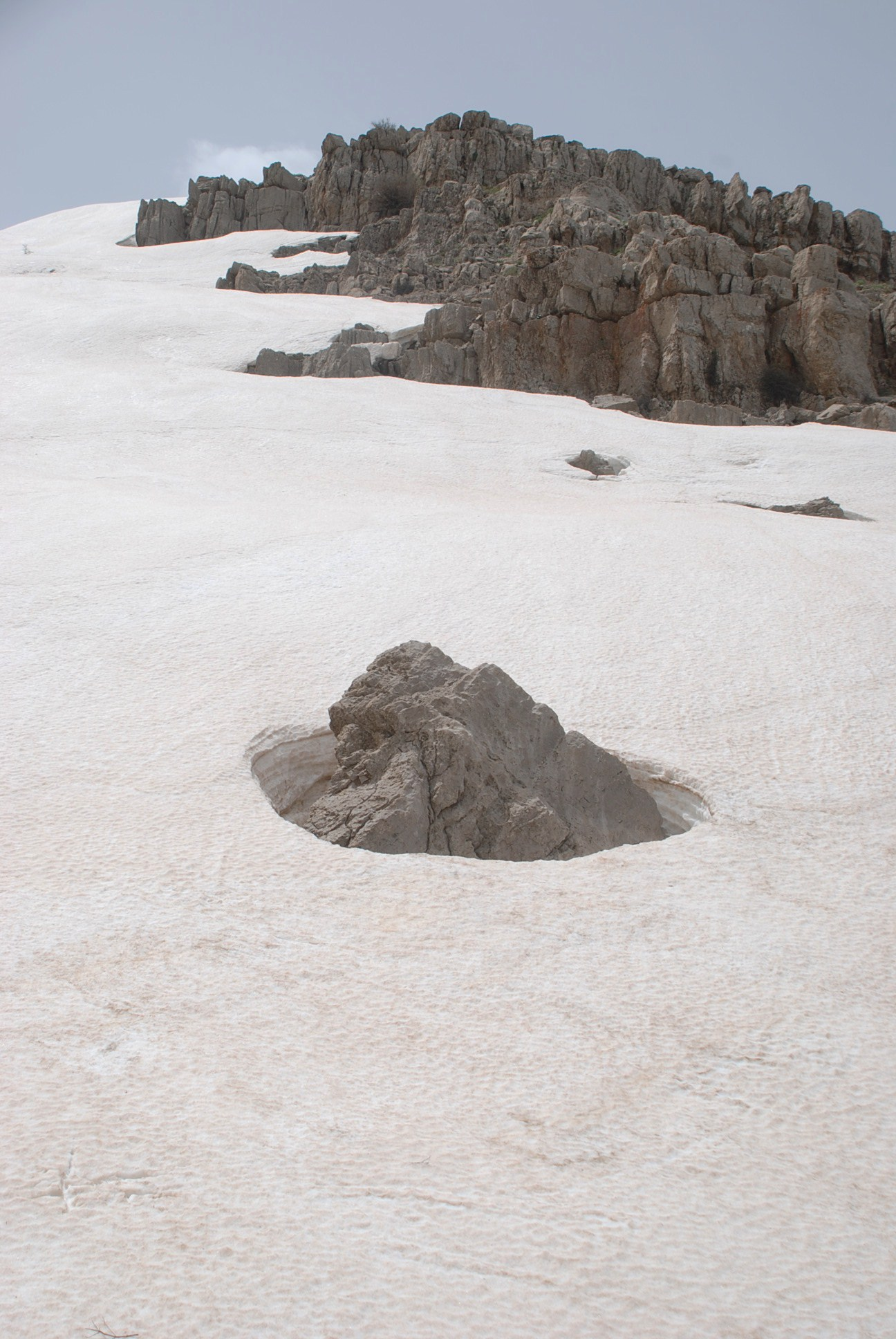
Summit of Mount Hermon

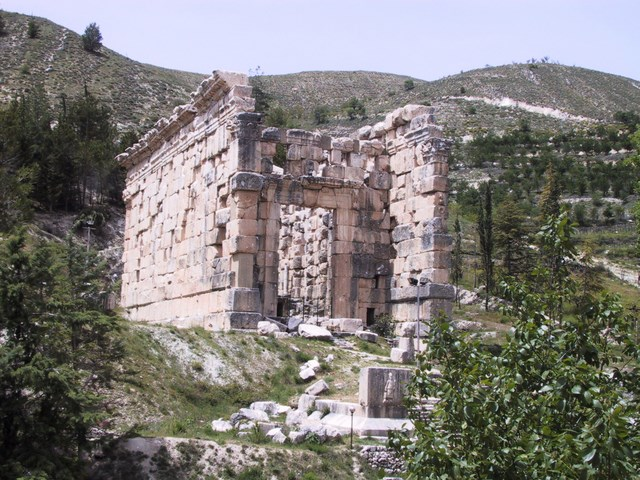
Roman temple at Niha, Lebanon

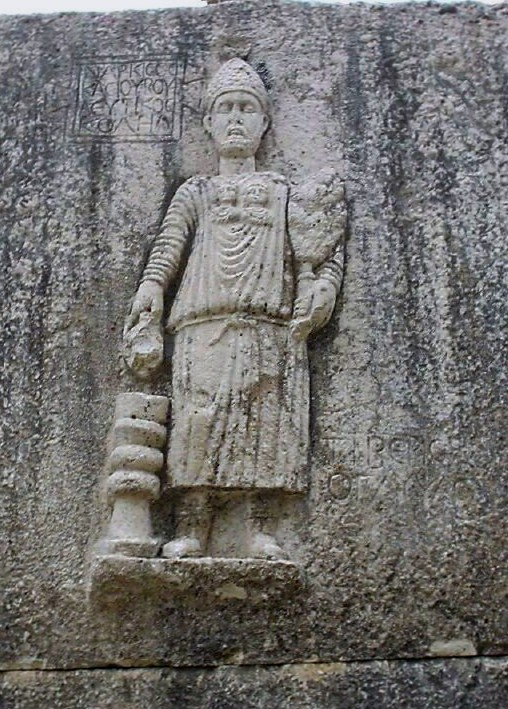
Statue at the Roman temple at Niha, Lebanon

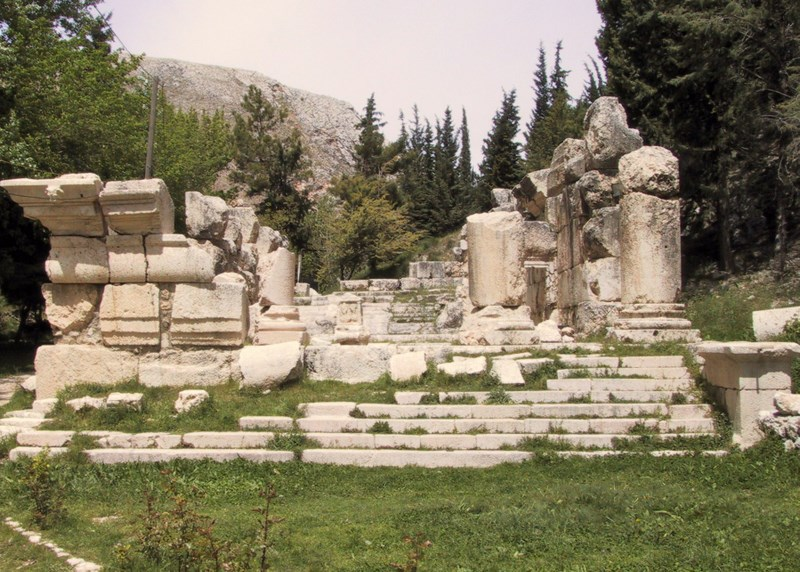
Small lower temple at Niha, Lebanon

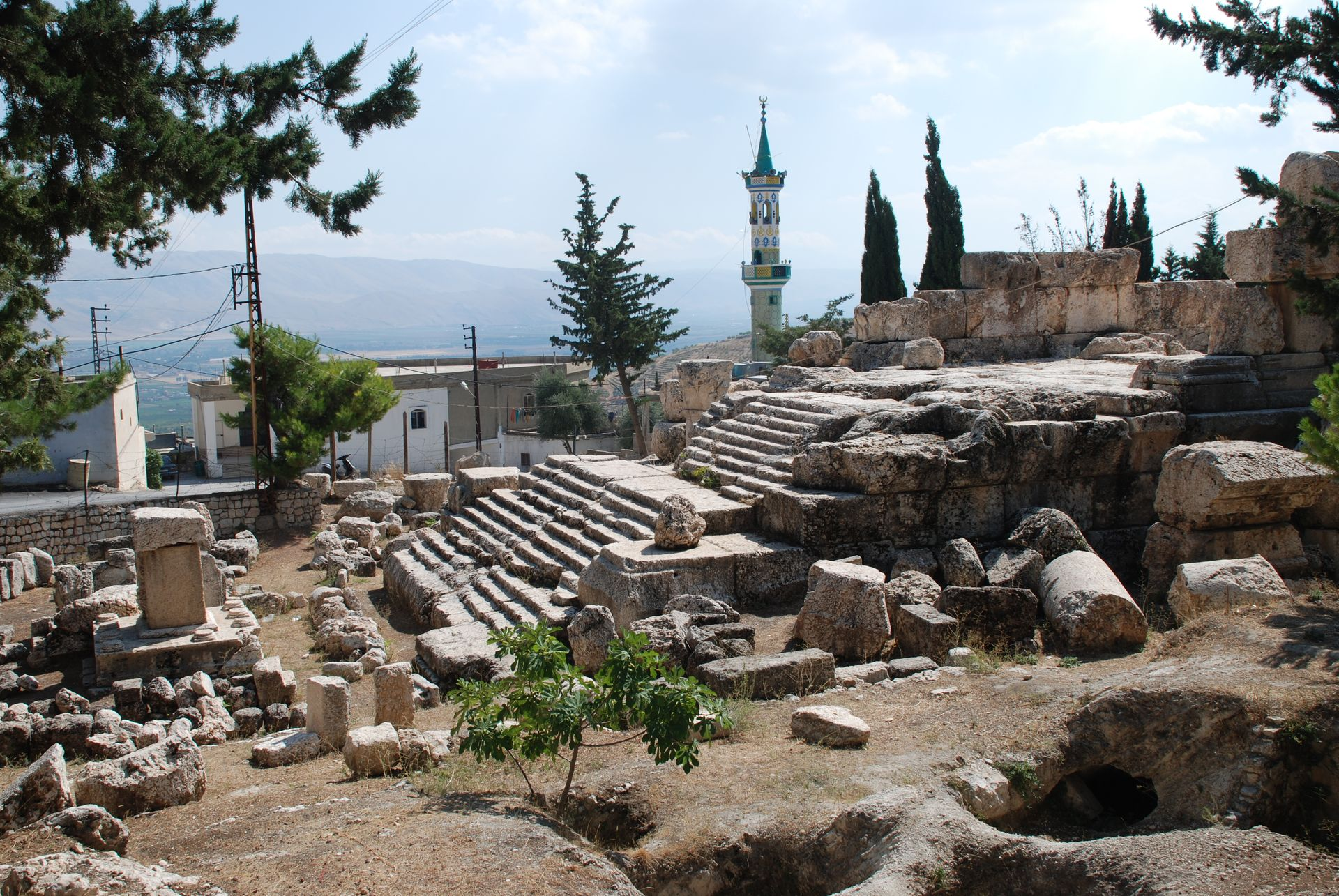
Roman temple of Qasr el Banat, Lebanon

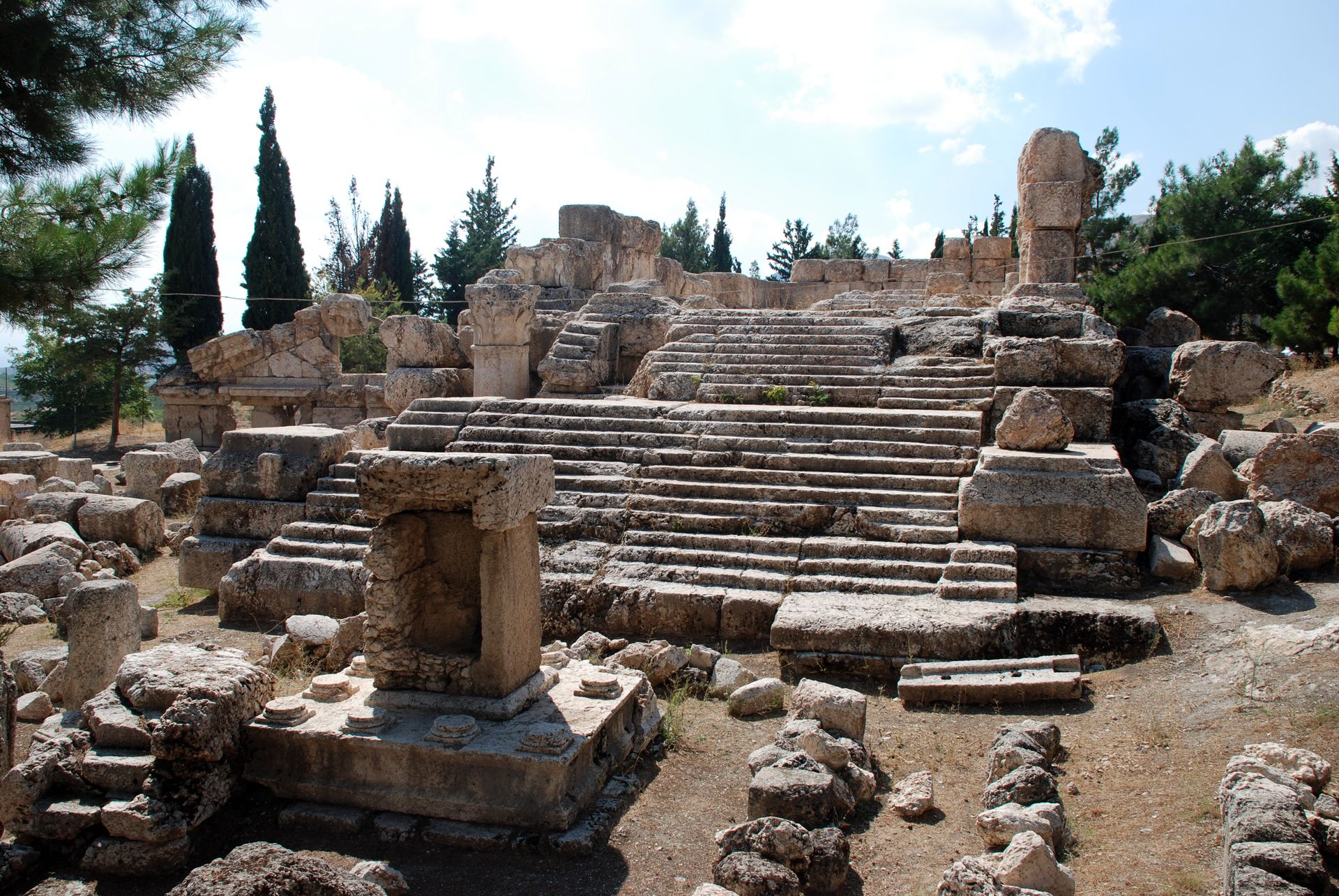
Roman temple of Qasr el Banat, Lebanon

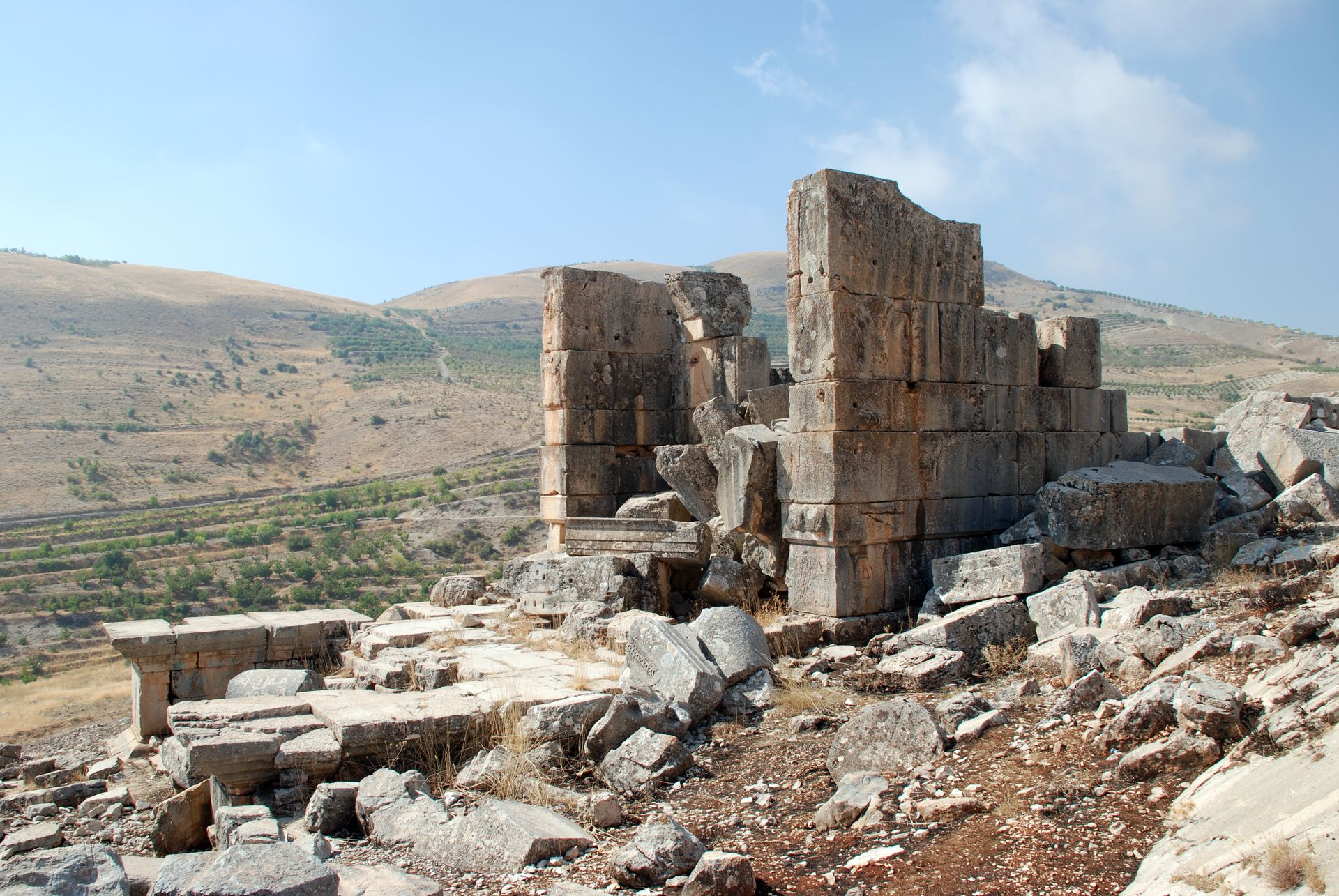
Roman temple of Hosn Niha, Lebanon

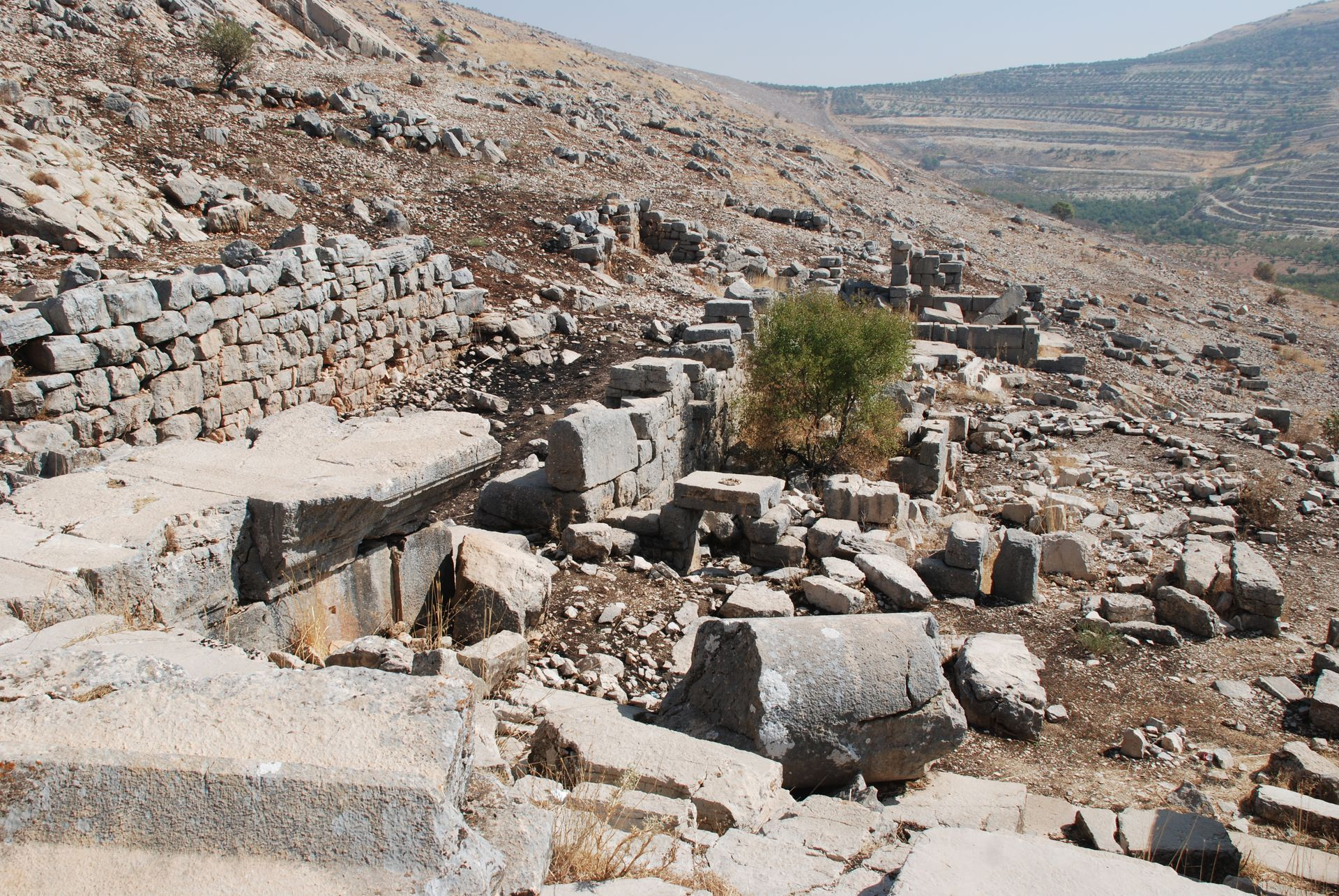
Roman temple of Hosn Niha, Lebanon

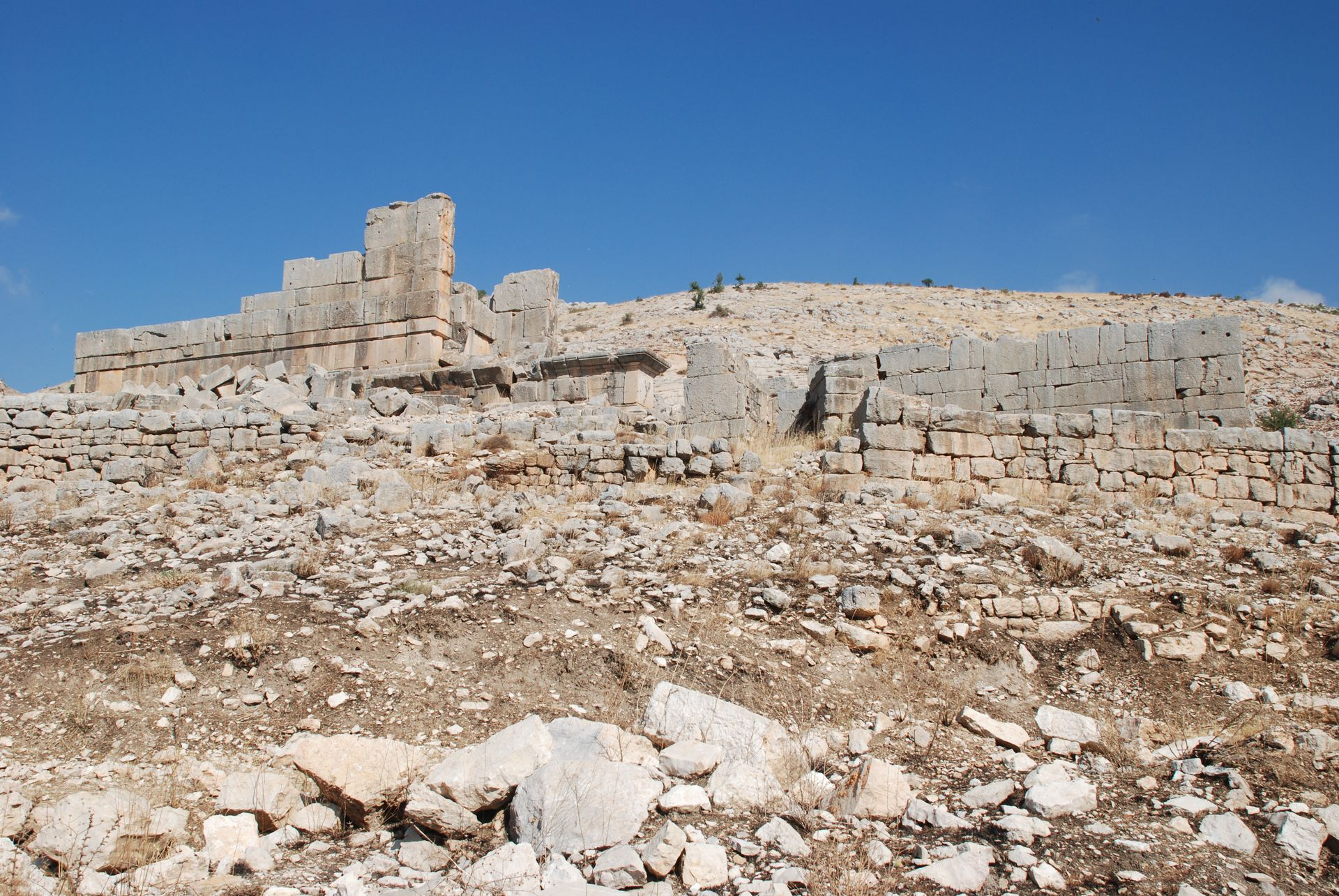
Roman temple of Hosn Niha, Lebanon

The Temples of Mount Hermon are around thirty Roman shrines and temples that are dispersed around the slopes of Mount Hermon in Lebanon, Israel and Syria. A few temples are built on former buildings of the Phoenician and Hellenistic era, but nearly all are considered to be of Roman construction and were largely abandoned during the persecution of pagans in the late Roman Empire.

The summit site of Qasr Antar was the highest temple of the ancient world, sitting at 2,814 metres (9,232 ft) above sea level. A Greek inscription was translated by George Nickelsburg to read "According to the command of the greatest a(nd) Holy God, those who take an oath (proceed) from here." Nickelsburg connected the inscription with oath taken by the angels under Semjaza who took an oath together, bound by a curse in order to take wives in the Book of Enoch (1 Enoch 6:6). Hermon was said to have become known as "the mountain of oath" by Charles Simon Clermont-Ganneau. The name of God was supposed to be a Hellenized version of Baʿal or Hadad and Nickelsburg connected it with the place name of Baal-Hermon (Lord of Hermon) and the deity given by Enoch as "The Great Holy One". The god Pan is often connected with the headwaters of the Jordan River in the area. Inscriptions on stones used in the church of Heleliye near Sidon have referred to Threption, son of Neikon offering stone lions to Zeus. Other deities noted to have been worshipped in the area were called Theandrios and Leucothea, which were likely Greek names substituted for native Canaanite gods.

== Surveys ==
Discovery of the Hermonian temples in rural villages began in the 19th century, with surveys by Edward Robinson and Sir Charles Warren. Ten sacred sites were also documented by Daniel Krencker and Willy Schietzschmann in 1938. Maurice Tallon published an itinerary of the sanctuaries in 1967 with details of the paths to reach them. George F. Taylor provided a pictorial guide in the late 1960s with more recent information coming from Shim'on Dar in 1993 and epigraphic surveys in 2002 and 2003. Some of the sites have been connected with the high places used for the worship of Baal in the Books of Kings.

The Seleucids occupied the area after 200 BCE, shortly after which the Ituraeans developed a principality in the area until the fall of Chalcis when the territory passed to the Herodian kings Agrippa I and Agrippa II. After the end of the first century CE, the territory became jointly controlled by the cities of Damascus, Sidon and Paneas. It is thought that the area was inhabited continuously until the third century CE. Precise dating of the structures is currently not possible. Krencker and Zscheitzschmann suggested they were mostly constructed between 150 and 300 CE and epigraphic evidence has been found to support this for several temples. Construction techniques have been seen to differ from those used in shrines of the Phoenician and Achaemenid and Hellenistic periods such as Tyre, Tell Anafa and Kharayeb. Recent studies have highlighted differences in construction style of the Hermonian temples from Hellenistic architecture at Khirbet Massakeb, Khirbet Zemel and other sites in the Hauran and Jawlan.

Although the sites may have been built on previous layers of architecture, the current temples are predominantly considered to be of Roman construction and were largely abandoned after the fourth century AD during the Byzantine era.

The temples were often connected with ancient occupational sites. Olivier Callot and Pierre-Louis Gatier argued that several of the temple sites might have been mistaken for monumental tombs as Roman mausoleums such as Saidnaya have been found in Lebanon. Taylor held the view that the religious architecture was the responsibility of "the hand of a single master builder" but was not able to answer the question of why so many shrines should be concentrated in the area. Henry Seyrig, when reviewing Krencker and Zscheitzmann's "Romische Tempel in Syrien" highlighted that "the clue to an important social and economic change that would deserve to be one day the focus of a study". There is still a deplorable lack of a comprehensive study into the history, archaeology, architecture of these buildings and ancient sites, or the religious life of the people who used them.

== Summit site of Qasr Antar ==
Recently have been additionally discovered in 2003 the Qasr Chbib complex, made of two small Roman temples situated just a few hundred meters from the summit of Mount Hermon. Both of the sanctuaries have northern walls that were carved out of solid bedrock.

There is a sacred building made of hewn blocks of stone on the summit of Mount Hermon. Known as Qasr Antar, it was the highest temple of the ancient world, sitting at 2,814 metres (9,232 ft) above sea level. It was documented by Sir Charles Warren in 1869. Warren described the temple as a rectangular building, sitting on an oval, stone plateau without roof. He removed a limestone stele from the northwest of the oval, broke it into two pieces and carried it down the mountain and back to the British Museum, where it currently resides.

A Greek inscription on the stele was translated by George Nickelsburg to read "According to the command of the greatest a(nd) Holy God, those who take an oath (proceed) from here." Nickelsburg connected the inscription with oath taken by the angels under Semjaza who took an oath together, bound by a curse in order to take wives in the Book of Enoch (1 Enoch 6:6). Hermon was said to have become known as "the mountain of oath" by Charles Simon Clermont-Ganneau. The name of God was supposed to be a Hellenized version of Baʿal or Hadad and Nickelsburg connected it with the place name of Baal-Hermon (Lord of Hermon) and the deity given by Enoch as "The Great Holy One". Eusebius recognized the religious importance of Hermon in his work "Onomasticon", saying "Until today, the mount in front of Panias and Lebanon is known as Hermon and it is respected by nations as a sanctuary". It has been related to the Arabic term al-haram, which means "sacred enclosure".

== Deities ==
Apart from the supreme god of the lofty sanctuary, other gods were evidenced to have been worshipped in the area. The god Pan is often connected with the headwaters of the Jordan River in the area. Inscriptions on stones used in the church of Heleliye near Sidon have referred to Threption, son of Neikon offering stone lions to Zeus. Other deities noted to have been worshipped in the area were called Theandrios and Leucothea, which were likely Greek names substituted for native Canaanite gods. Leucothea was the Greek goddess of the sea and she was known to have been worshipped from 60 CE at the temple devoted to her at Rakleh and also at Kfar Zabad, Inkhil, Tel Jezreel, Tyre and Segeria as evidenced by an inscription found at Ayn al-Burj.

The Gods of Kiboreia are known from a Greek inscription taken from a large temple at Deir El Aachayer on the northern slopes of Mount Hermon in Lebanon.

The inscription was found noting that a bench was installed "in the year 242, under Beeliabos, also called Diototos, son of Abedanos, high priest of the gods of Kiboreia". The era of the gods of Kiboreia is not certain, as is their location which is not conclusively to be identified with Deir El Aachayer, but was possibly the Roman sanctuary or the name of a settlement in the area. It has been suggested that the name Kiboreia was formed from the Aramaic word kbr, meaning a "place of great abundance".

== Sites in Lebanon ==
George Taylor divided up the Temples of Lebanon into three groups, one group of Temples of the Beqaa Valley lies north of the road from Beirut to Damascus. Second, there is the group in the area south of the same road, including the Wadi al-Taym and the western flank of Mount Hermon. Third, the group in the area west of a line drawn along the ridge of Mount Lebanon. There are relatively few temples along Lebanon's coastal plain. The Temples of Mount Hermon in Taylor's second group included Ain Harcha, Aaiha, Deir El Aachayer, Dekweh, Yanta, Hebbariye, Ain Libbaya, Nebi Safa, Aaqbe, Khirbet El-Knese, Mejdal Anjar, Mdoukha and Bakka. Four new sites were identified during epigraphic surveys of 2003 and 2004 at Ain Ata, Ain Qaniya, Korsei el-Debb and Qasr Chbib whilst possible identification was made requiring further investigation at the sites of Qatana, Kafr Dura, Qalaat al-Almond, Haouch Hafoufa and Mazraat el-Faqaa.

The recently found Qasr Chbib is a complex of two Roman temples situated a few hundred meters from the summit of Mount Hermon. Both of the sanctuaries have northern walls that were carved out of solid bedrock of the mountain.

== Sites in Israel ==
A sacred site at Tel Dan has been excavated southwest of Mount Hermon. It was shown to have had successive layers of occupation through the Pottery Neolithic, Chalcolithic, Bronze Age, Iron Age, Greco-Roman, Medieval and Ottoman period.

== Sites in Syria ==
Of the Syrian Hermonian temples, the easiest to reach from Damascus are at Burqush and Rakleh. At the temple in Rakleh, there is an engraved god on one wall, surrounded by a wreath and facing towards Mount Hermon.

Two other sanctuaries that have been the subject of study by Israelis in the occupied Golan Heights are Qalaat Bustra and Har Senaim.
