= Khirbet El-Knese =

Two Roman temples in Lebanon

- El-Knese, El Knese
- Location within Lebanon
- 33.5841°N 35.9202°E
- Cultures: Roman
- Location: south of Yanta
- Region: Rashaya District

Site notes
- Condition: Ruins
- Public access: Yes

Khirbet El-Knese, El-Knese or El Knese are two Roman temples south of Yanta, north of Rashaya in the Rashaya District of the Beqaa Governorate in Lebanon.

== Data ==
The upper and lower temples are included in a group of Temples of Mount Hermon. The lower temple faces east with the peak of Mount Hermon to the south. George F. Taylor described it as an Antae temple with moulded architraves to the right of the south antae.

El Knese has supposed connections to the word "ecclesia".

The ruins are in dire conditions, with only a wall remaining in relative good shape

== See also ==
- Temples of Mount Hermon
