= Aaiha =

Aaiha عيحا
- Village
- Interactive map of Aaiha
- Country: Lebanon
- Governorate: Beqaa Governorate
- District: Rashaya District

Aaiha
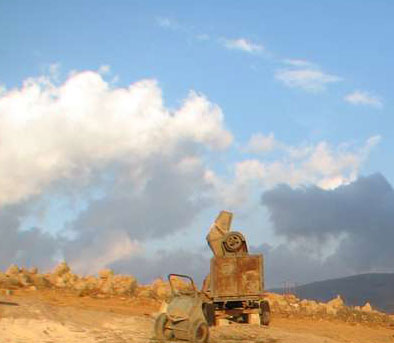
- A concrete mixer laying concrete on the central hill of the Aaiha plain, remains of stone walls behind

- Location within Lebanon
- 33°29′59″N 35°52′24″E
- Cultures: Roman, Greek
- Location: 2 kilometres (1.2 mi) northeast of Rashaya
- Region: Bekaa Valley

Site notes
- Condition: Ruins
- Public access: Yes

Aaiha (or Aiha) (Arabic: عيحا, romanized: ʿAyḥā) is a village, plain, lake, and temporary wetland situated in the Rashaya District and south of the Beqaa Governorate in Lebanon. It is located in an intermontane basin near Mount Hermon and the Syrian border, approximately halfway between Rashaya and Kfar Qouq.

The village sits c. 3,750 feet (1,140 m) above sea level and the small population is predominantly Druze. Wild wheats Triticum boeoticum and T. urartu grow in this area, also used for farming goats. There is a nearby tomb of a Muslim saint and a Roman ruins thought to be a temple or citadel that is now totally destroyed

== Aaiha plain, Aaiha lake and Aaiha intermittent lake ==
The village is situated on a ridge next to Aaiha plain, an intermittent lake that forms a near perfect circular shape, approximately 2 miles (3.2 km) in diameter and enclosed by mountains and the ridge on the west. The plain is completely level with no particularly visible outlet for water, which occasionally floods the basin to a depth of several feet to form a lake. The creation of the lake is assisted by fountains that well up through a large chasm in the northwest and a smaller fissure in the southeast. It has also been noted that when the waters subside, they drain down these fissures. Investigative potholers have claimed a permanent stream flows underneath these fissures.

== The Chaff of Phiala ==
The smaller southeastern fissure was investigated and found to be 15 feet (4.6 m) in diameter, 8 feet (2.4 m) to 10 feet (3.0 m) deep with no sign of water at the bottom. Robinson did not record any investigation of the larger one to the northwest of the plain, which was not flooded at the time, during the summer. The villagers suggest the underground stream leads to and is the original source and fountain of the Hasbani river, the most northern source of the Jordan River. This is notably similar to that described in the tale of "The Chaff of Phiala" in The Jewish War by Flavius Josephus. Josephus tells a geographically inaccurate tale of a cavern in an ancient place called Phiala or Phiale (modern Birkat Ram), discovered to be the initial source of the Jordan by Philip the Tetrarch of Trachonitis. He threw chaff into Phiala and found it was carried by the waters to Panium (modern Banias), previously thought to be the origin of the Jordan river. Josephus writes:

Now Panium is thought to be the fountain of the Jordan, but in reality it is carried thither after an occult manner from the place called Phiala : This place lies as you go up to Trachonitis, and is an hundred and twenty furlongs from Caesarea, and is not far out of the road on the right hand; and indeed it hath its name of Phiala (vial or bowl) very justly, from the roundness of its circumference, as being round like a wheel; its water continues always up to its edges, without either sinking or running over. And as this origin of the Jordan was formerly not known, it was discovered so to be when Philip was Tetrarch of Trachonitis; for he had chaff thrown into Phiala, and it was found at Panium where the ancients thought the fountain head of the river was, whither it had been therefore carried (by the waters).

Edward Robinson commented that this story would appear still current in respect to this chasm and underground stream leading to the Hasbani. Some neolithic flints have been recovered in this area, in the hills 3 kilometres (1.9 mi) north of Rashaya.

== Roman temple ==
Edward Robinson and Eli Smith visited in 1852 and noted a massive Roman temple had once been located near the village that has been grouped by George Taylor amongst the Temples of Mount Hermon.

Robinson suggested the temple was bigger than Nebi Safa and spoke of it having been constructed of stones that were "tolerably large, well hewn, but not bevelled". Fragments of architrave, mouldings and blocks from the temple had been re-used by the villagers making their homes and farmsteads and had been left lying all over the fields, covered in rubbish.

Sir Charles Warren also later visited and documented the area as part of an archaeological survey in 1869. He noted a long wall leading off into the east away from the village and temple. He also noted some vaults and rock-cut features and took a copy of an Ancient Greek inscription from one of the blocks.

The temple was completed in 92 AD but only the western part remained when visited, located on the top of a hill overlooking the plain.

The temple was constructed of blue limestone with an entrance opening facing east and a sideways bearing of 78°30'. The base of the temples was described as Attic and was positioned on top of an 18 inches (0.46 m) socle. There were four courses of stones layered above a 5.7 feet (1.7 m) high, corniced stylobate, measuring 18 inches (0.46 m), 2.2 feet (0.67 m), 2.3 feet (0.70 m) and 2.2 feet (0.67 m). Houses and a stable were built over the temple. Robinson also found a Corinthian frieze and judged the style of many of the blocks to be Corinthian in appearance. A stone with a Greek inscription was found built into the western wall. The structure measures 37.6 feet (11.5 m) wide by at least 47.15 feet (14.37 m) long with an entrance to vaults underneath. A column found nearby measured 3.2 feet (0.98 m) in diameter.

== Wildlife ==
The white-eyed pochard was noted at the Aaiha lake (then called the Rashaya lake) by Nevins in 1955, but not in 1956 as the lake had reverted to being a plain that year. The duck is thought to have been driven off by frequent shooting. Nevins also noted the Eurasian teal as a resident in the winter, when the lake was present and the waters hadn't drained down the chasm to the Hasbani.

== Bibliography ==
- Warren, C.; Conder, C.R. (1884). The Survey of Western Palestine: Jerusalem. London: Committee of the Palestine Exploration Fund. (p. 496)
