= Ain Harcha =

Ain Harcha عين حرشة
- Village
- Interactive map of Ain Harcha
- Country: Lebanon
- Governorate: Beqaa Governorate
- District: Rashaya District
- Elevation: 3,900 ft (1,200 m)

Ain Harcha
- Ain Hircha
- Location within Lebanon
- 33.456389°N 35.783889°E
- Cultures: Roman
- Location: south of Dahr El Ahmar
- Region: Bekaa Valley

Site notes
- Condition: Ruins
- Public access: Yes

Ain Harcha ((Arabic: عين حرشة, romanized: ʿAyn Ḥarshah), also spelled Ain Hircha) is a village situated in the Rashaya District and south of the Beqaa Governorate in Lebanon. It is located east of Mount Hermon close to the Syrian border south of Dahr El Ahmar. The village is home to a Roman temple.

The village sits ca. 1,200 metres (3,900 ft) above sea level and the name is claimed in Aramaic to mean "house of spirits" or "place of worship" with some seeing this as derived from "the feast of sorceries" due to local folklore suggesting an evil spirit of Ain Al-Horsh inhabits the springs of Lebanon.

== History ==
In 1838, Eli Smith noted 'Ain Harshy's population as being Druze and Christians.

The temple and archaeological site at Ain Harcha were amongst 34 cultural heritage properties given enhanced protection by UNESCO to safeguard them during the Israeli invasion of Lebanon in 2024.

== Roman temple ==
2 kilometres (2,000 m) (about a forty-minute walk) along a rocky path, on a ridge-top to the west, 525 metres (1,722 ft) higher than the village sits one of the best examples of a Roman temple in the vicinity of Mount Hermon. The temple of Ain Harcha can also be reached by walking down from the village of Ain Ata. It was restored in 1938-1939 and dates, based on a Greek inscription on one of the blocks, to 114-115 AD. The temple is built of limestone, opens to the east and blends in with the landscape. The pediment and west wall are in particularly good condition and two columns bases show what supported the beams and roof. Carved blocks show busts of Selene, the moon goddess and Helios, the sun god. Around the site are remnants of ancient habitations and tombs.

== Bibliography ==
- Robinson, E.; Smith, E. (1841). Biblical Researches in Palestine, Mount Sinai and Arabia Petraea: A Journal of Travels in the year 1838. Vol. 3. Boston: Crocker & Brewster.
