= Rakhlah =

Rakhlah رخلة Rakhleh, Rakhlé, Zenopolis
- Village
- Location in Syria
- Coordinates: 33°30′59″N 35°58′22″E
- Country: Syria
- Governorate: Rif Dimashq Governorate
- District: Qatana District
- Nahiyah: Qatana
- Elevation: 1,550 m (5,090 ft)

Population (2004 census)
  - Total: 368
- Time zone: UTC+3 (EET)
  - Summer (DST): UTC+2 (EEST)

Rakhlah (Arabic: رخلة; also spelled Rakhleh or Rakhlé), previously known as Zenopolis, is a village situated 31 kilometres (19 mi) west of Damascus, Syria. also known as "The town of Wine and Poetry".

According to the Syria Central Bureau of Statistics, the village had a population of 368 in the 2004 census. Its inhabitants are predominantly from the Druze community.

The presence of Druze around Mount Hermon is documented since the founding of the Druze religion in the beginning of the 11th century. Accordingly, the population is predominantly Druze. The main family is Abou Kheir.

== Ancient history ==
In Late Antiquity, the city was known as Zenopolis (Greek: Ζηνούπολις), in the Roman province of Phoenice Paralia (or "Phoenicia Prima"). It became a city and a bishopric at the end of the 5th century.

Rakhlah is a possible location of the bishopric of "Rachlea" included in the Catholic Church's list of titular sees. In his account of this bishopric, which he calls that "of the Rachlenes" (Latin Rachlenorum, Greek Ραχληνῶν), Le Quien says that, at a provincial synod held at Tyre in 518, Elias, spoken of in the acts as Bishop of the Rachlenes, signed as Ἠλίας ἐπίσκοπος Ζηνουπόλεως (Elias Bishop of Zenopolis); and that the acts of the Second Council of Constantinople in 553 bear the signature of "Anastasius by the mercy of God Bishop of the Rachlenes in the province of the Tyrians".

=== Ancient temples ===
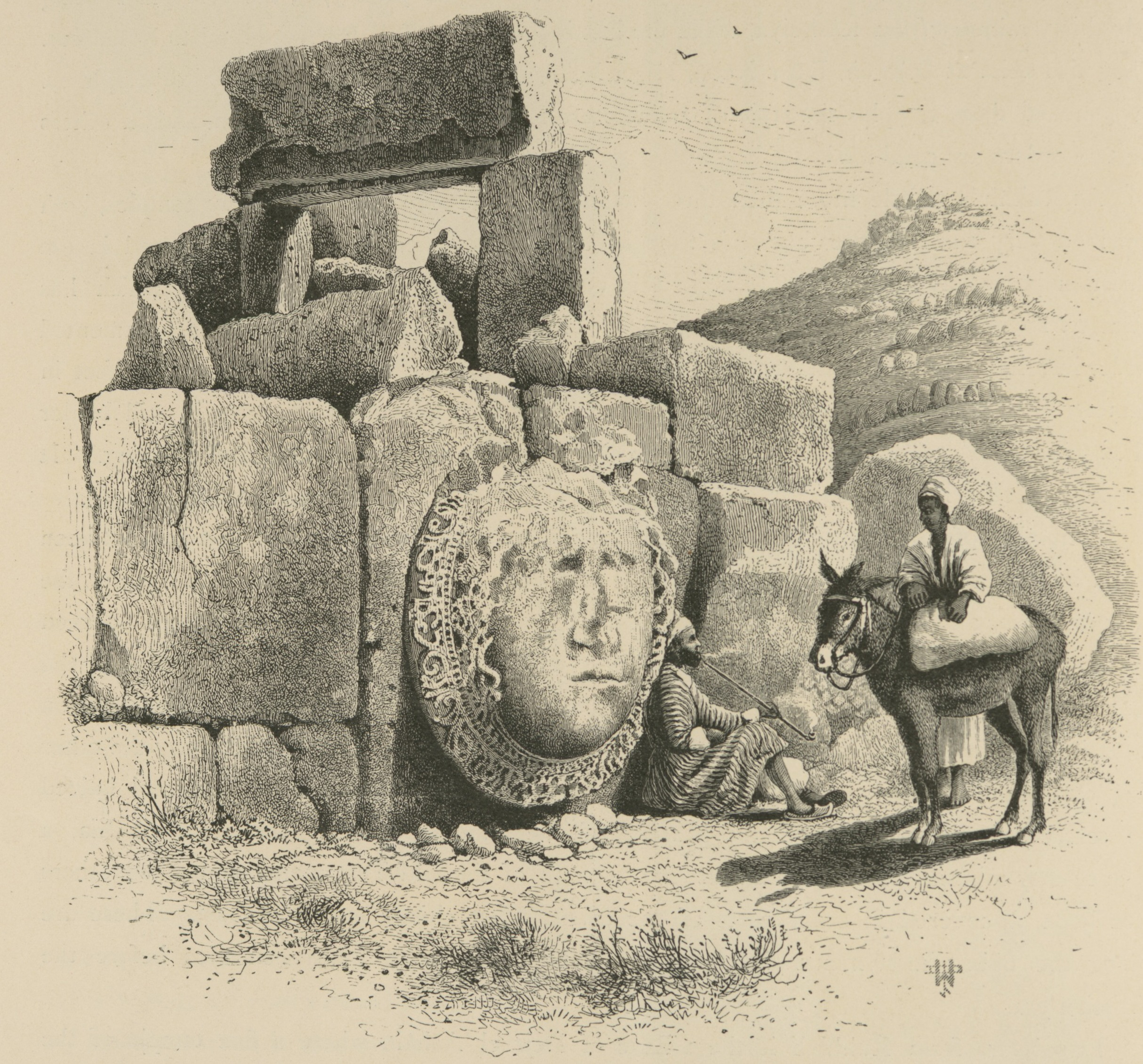
Medallion on the temple at Rûkhleh, outside the south wall, near the east corner

There are the ruins of two Roman-Phoenician temples in the village that are included in a group of Temples of Mount Hermon. The smaller, apsidal temple was cut out of bedrock. The other, larger temple may have been used as a church and is constructed of enormous blocks of limestone; it measures 82.5 feet (25.1 m) by 57 feet (17 m). It features two rows of ionic columns that run along the walls from the entrance to a semi-circular altar. One of the walls of the temple is adorned with a relief of the face of a sun god, possibly Ba'al within a wreath that is aligned to look at Mount Hermon and measures 40 inches (100 cm) in diameter. Two stones close to the gate show depictions of a bird with outstretched wings that was suggested to have been part of the temple's architrave. The carving was described as "essentially Assyrian in character" by Edward Robinson when visiting the site in 1852. He further suggested that the stone was brought to the site from a far distance. He considered the construction of the temples was likely to have taken place "many centuries before the Christian era". He noted several Greek inscriptions and took some copies. The epigraphic information derived from the inscriptions at Rakleh has supported the existence of a local settlement and given details of the names and positions of the temple officials. One of the texts starts with the invocation "to the Good Fortune". It is also known from the inscriptions that the Greek goddess of the sea, Leucothea, was worshipped in the temple from 60 CE onwards. Two of the texts show that the officials exercised an unspecified authority. They detail the restoration of the temple using funds, implying they owned estates or assets earning interest. A building constructed in 253 CE was said to have been paid for "at the expense of the goddess taken from the interest". The treasurers of the temple also funded a new door in 379 CE.

A few other rock cut tombs and caverns have been noted around the area.

== See also ==
- Druze in Syria
