= Aaqbe =

Aaqbe العقبه Akbeh, Aqbe, Akbe, Aqbeh, Aaqabet, el-Aaqbe, Akraba, Aaqabet Rashaya, Akabe
- Village
- Interactive map of Aaqbe
- Country: Lebanon
- Governorate: Beqaa Governorate
- District: Rashaya District

Aaqbe
- Akbeh, Aqbe, Akbe, Aqbeh
- Location within Lebanon
- 33.5051°N 35.8211°E
- Cultures: Roman
- Location: 3 kilometres (1.9 mi) west of Rashaya
- Region: Rashaya

Site notes
- Condition: Ruins
- Public access: Yes

Aaqbe (Levantine Arabic: العقبه, romanized: al-ʿAqbeh), also spelled Akbeh, Aqbe, Akbe, Aaqabet, el-Aaqbe, Akraba, Aaqabet Rashaya or Akabe, is a village and municipality situated 3 kilometres (1.9 mi) west of Rashaya in the Rashaya District of the Beqaa Governorate in Lebanon.

== Roman temple ==
The village contains the vestiges of a Roman temple, one of Mount Hermon group of temples . The temple is situated on a hill with a commanding view of Mount Hermon. George F. Taylor classified it as an Antae temple of a rugged design that lacked decoration. He noted that the doorway of the temple does not face the summit; it aligns instead to a northerly area of the mountain that is covered by a ridge. The temple featured a niche that may have housed a cult statue of which only the framing columns have survived. Three sections of the east antae pillar were also still in place.

== Bibliography ==
- Ted Kaizer (2008). The Variety of Local Religious Life in the Near East In the Hellenistic and Roman Periods. BRILL. pp. 319–. ISBN 978-90-04-16735-3.
