= Kfar Danis =

Kfar Danis كفر دنيس
- Village
- Location in Lebanon
- Coordinates: 33°32′58″N 35°51′11″E
- Country: Lebanon
- Governorate: Beqaa
- District: Rashaya
- Elevation: 3,710 ft (1,130 m)

Kfar Danis (كفر دنيس) is a village in Lebanon, situated in Rashaya District, Beqaa Governorate. It is located north of Dahr El Ahmar. Kfar Danis is 78 kilometres (48 mi) away from the capital of Beirut.

== Population ==
The religious majorities in the village are Sunnis and Shiites followed by Druze, Maronites and Greek Orthodox Christians.

A significant percentage of the village population have migrated to the capital city of Beirut. Also, a significant percentage of the village population have migrated overseas to countries such as Brazil, Argentina, United States of America, Canada, Australia, Mexico, Gulf Arab states and European Union (UK and France).

== Notable people ==
- Canadian hockey player Nazem Kadri is of local descent through his father, Sam Kadri.

== See also ==
- List of cities and towns in Lebanon
- List of municipalities of Lebanon
