= Har Senaim =

Mountain and archaeological site in the Golan Heights

- Senaim
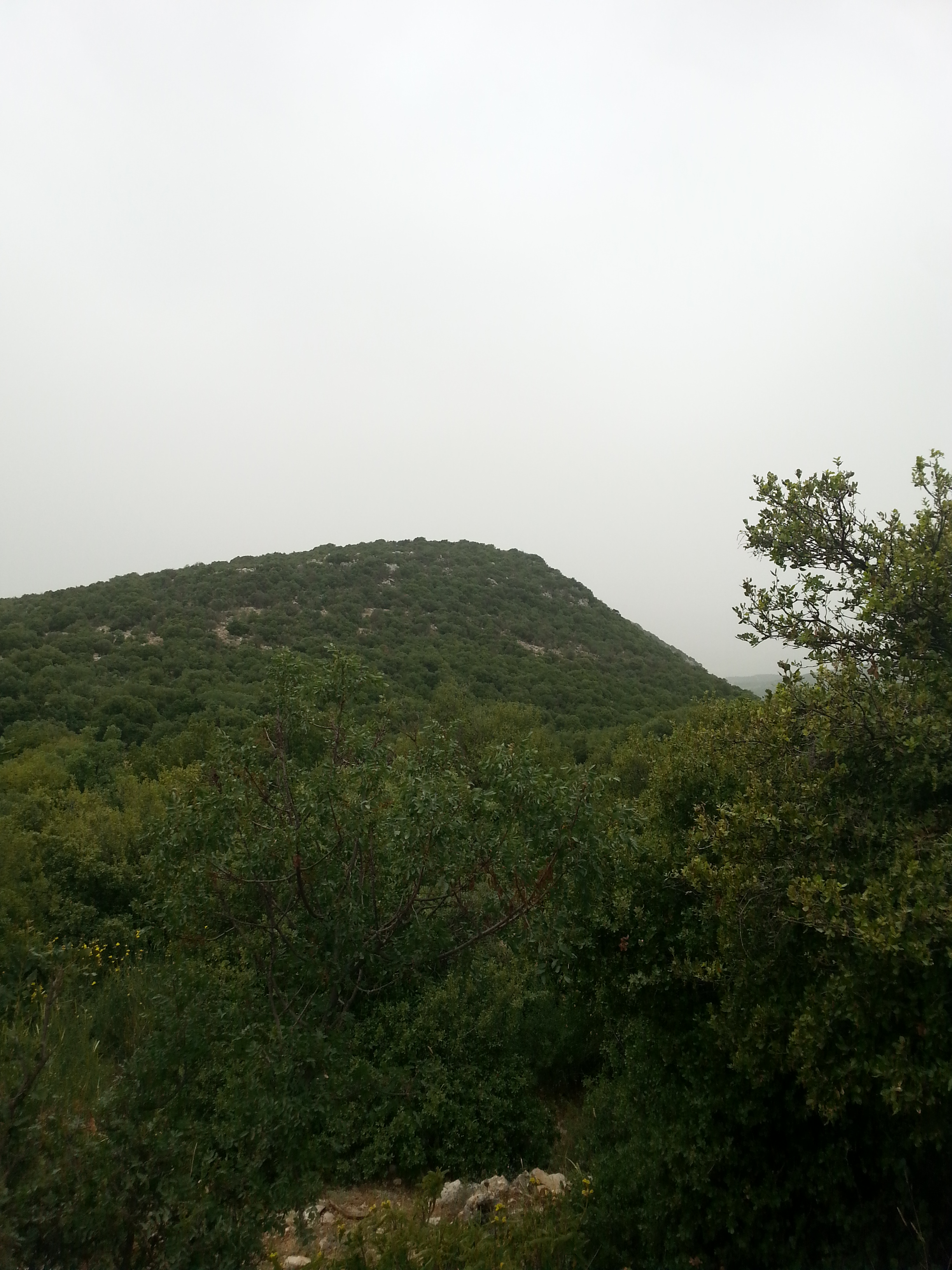
- Interactive map of Har Senaim
- 33.271202°N 35.729458°E
- Type: Roman temple, Greek temple and ancient settlement
- Periods: Ancient Rome, Ancient Greece
- Region: Golan Heights

Site notes
- Archaeologists: Shim'on Dar
- Condition: Ruins

Har Senaim or Senaim (Hebrew: הר סנאים, romanized: Har Senaʾim, lit. 'Mount of squirrels'; Arabic: Hafur el-Qurn, or Tell el-Hafur, or Arabic: جبل الحلاوة, romanized: Jabal Halawa, lit. 'Mountain of Sweetness'), is an archaeological site that sits on a peak near Mount Hermon in the Israeli-occupied portion of the Golan Heights, 15 kilometres (9.3 mi) north east of Kiryat Shmona and 4 kilometres (2.5 mi) from Banias.

== History ==
The site features a Roman temple and settlement that has been included in a group of Temples of Mount Hermon. The ruins of a second Ancient Greek temple were also found nearby. The Roman temple featured an altar carved with a relief of Helios, the sun god. The shrine at Har Senaim was carved out of solid bedrock. The settlement measures approximately 5,000 square metres (0.50 ha).

Various ancient Greek inscriptions were found at the site. One inscription found on the altar called upon the great Gods in an appeal for the salvation of the Emperor Hadrian. Other finds included a basalt animal muzzle and a brass ring that was decorated with the image of a merman. A coin minted by the Hasmonean ruler John Hyrcanus was also found at the site.

Several coins were found dating to Byzantine and Mamluk periods. The complex at Har Senaim has been suggested to be a cult site or funerary garden and compared to the high places mentioned in the Books of Kings.
