= Aaynata =

Aaynata may refer to:

- Aynata in Bint Jbeil District, in southern Lebanon
- Ainata in Baalbek District, in northern Lebanon
- Ain Aata, in Rashaya District of the Beqaa Governorate in Lebanon
