= Theandrios =

Ancient Greek deity worshipped in Syria

In Greek religion and mythology, Theandrios (Greek: Θεάνδριος, "God-Man") or Theandrates (Θεανδράτης) is a deity that was worshipped in towns and villages around Mount Hermon by North Arabian tribes of pre-Islamic Arabia. Theandrios is evidenced by a dedication to a male god found at Beit Rime, Syria and it is supposed that the Greek name was imposed on a previous god of the region. He is also referred to in an inscription found in Attil, Suwayda.

He has been considered the Arabian version of similar "God-man" deities such as Dionysus, Heracles, Mithras, Krishna and Jesus.

== See also ==
- Temples of Mount Hermon
- Theanthropos, a Christian title for Jesus pertaining to the hypostatic union
