= Kfar Qouq =

Kfar Qouq كفر قوق
- Village
- Interactive map of Kfar Qouq
- Country: Lebanon
- Governorate: Beqaa Governorate
- District: Rashaya District

Kfar Qouq
- Location within Lebanon
- 33.533889°N 35.8925°E
- Cultures: Greek, Roman
- Location: 3 kilometres (1.9 mi) North of Rashaya
- Region: Bekaa Valley

Site notes
- Condition: Ruins
- Public access: Yes

Kfar Qouq (and variations of spelling) is a village in Lebanon, situated in the Rashaya District and south of the Beqaa Governorate. It is located in an intermontane basin near Mount Hermon near the Syrian border, approximately halfway between Jezzine and Damascus.

The population of the hillside village is predominantly Druze.

== History ==
Kfar Qouq contains two Roman temple sites in the Western section of the town dating to around 111 BC and another less preserved temple near the church. Fragments such as columns and an inscribed block have been re-used in the village and surrounding area. The surrounding area also has many stone basins, tombs, caves, rock cut niches and other remnants from Greek and Roman times.

Dr. Edward Robinson, visited in the Summer of 1852 and noted a Greek inscription on a doorway, the public fountain and a large reservoir which he noted "exhibits traces of antiquity". The name of the village means "the pottery place" in Aramaic and has also been known as Kfar Quq Al-Debs in relation to molasses and grape production in the area. Kfar Qouq also been associated with King Qouq, a ruler in ancient times.

The local highway was targeted in the 2006 Lebanon War between Hezbollah and Israel.
