= Qal'at Bustra =

Archaeological site in Lebanon

- Qalat Bustra, Qalaat Bustra, Harviya
- Location within Lebanon
- 33.2866°N 35.6688°E
- Type: farmhouse and Roman temple
- Periods: Ancient Rome
- Region: Lebanon

Site notes
- Archaeologists: Shim'on Dar
- Condition: Ruins

Qal'at Bustra or Qalat Bustra is an archaeological site in Lebanon, close to the border of the Sheba Farms region of the Israeli-occupied Golan Heights, about 5 km ENE of Ghajar. It is situated on a peak of height 786m with a panoramic westward view. Qal'at Bustr (that means "castle at Bustra") is believed to be an ancient Roman sanctuary and was excavated by Israeli archaeologists. Remains found at the site include a farmhouse and temple dating from the Hellenistic and Roman period.

== History ==
Archaeological surveys were first made in 1970–1972, who named the place Harviya. In 1990 a second expedition, carried out under the auspices of Bar Ilan University's Department of Land of Israel Studies, learned from local Arabs that the place is called Qal'at Bustra. The investigations revealed stelae and evidence of cultic activity dating to the Hellenistic period or earlier which continued into the Roman period. A farmhouse and temple discovered at the site have been dated to the Hellenistic and Roman periods (third century BCE to third-fourth centuries CE).

The farmstead is located at the center of a large farmyard, surrounded by well-built stone walls. It has many rooms that served different purposes. A villa-like structure contained a tower which is still visible. The surrounding farmland counts remains of many structures, including buildings, walls. Water cisterns with unusually large capacity for the region were found.

At the highest point of the peak, there are the remains a Roman temple covering about 100 square meters. Only the foundations, the foundation stones, and one course of stones are preserved. Discoveries in the temenos of the temple included eleven coins that were dated between the third century BCE and the third century CE. One was dated to the reign of Herod Antipas. Parts of a marble statue that include a male foot wearing a sandal was also recovered; it was probably a local deity worshipped at the temple. A collection of snails were also found. Various animal bones were discovered and dated to the 5th century CE including sheep, goats, cattle and a chicken.

The farmhouse is similar to others in the mount Hermon's area.

== See also ==
- Archaeology of Lebanon
- Temples of Mount Hermon
