= Jdeidat Yabous =

Jdeidat Yabous جديدة يابوس Jdeidet Yabous
- Village
- Location in Syria
- Coordinates: 33°39′14″N 35°58′18″E
- Country: Syria
- Governorate: Rif Dimashq Governorate
- District: Qudsaya District
- Nahiyah: Al-Dimas

Population (2004 census)
  - Total: 994
- Time zone: UTC+3 (EET)
  - Summer (DST): UTC+2 (EEST)

Jdeidat Yabous (Arabic: جديدة يابوس; also spelled Jdeidet Yabous), previously known as Ainkania, is a village situated 45 kilometres (28 mi) west of Damascus, Syria. According to the Syria Central Bureau of Statistics, the village had a population of 994 in the 2004 census.

The village is in the hills, on the border between Syria and Lebanon with Masnaa Border Crossing nearby. Weapons have been seized at the checkpoint, being smuggled from Lebanon concealed in the floor of a truck, to arm rebels in the Syrian civil war.

There are seams of iron ore in the area.

== Ain Qaniya spring and Roman temple ==
There is a spring and Roman temple in the area called Ain Qaniya or Ayn Qaniya. Julien Aliquot identified the ancient name of the village, which was previously called Ainkania after this spring. A study of the ancient settlement and sanctuary is currently in progress under Ibrahim Omeri. It has been suggested that the goddess Leucothea was worshiped at the temple, which sits in the north east of a group of Temples of Mount Hermon.
