= Dahr Al-Ahmar =

Dahr ِAl-Ahmar ضهر الأحمر
- Village
- Location in Lebanon
- Coordinates: 33°31′45″N 35°50′55″E
- Country: Lebanon
- Governorate: Beqaa Governorate
- District: Rashaya District

Area
  - Total: 3.92 sq mi (10.14 km^{2})
- Elevation: 3,540 ft (1,080 m)

Dahr Al-Ahmar (Arabic: ضهر الأحمر, romanized: Dahr al-ʾAḥmar) is a village in Lebanon, situated in the Rashaya District and south of the Beqaa Governorate. It is located near the Syrian border, approximately 6 km from Rashaya and south of Kfar Danis. The population of the village is predominantly Druze. There is a shrine in the village to an important woman in Druze history, Sitt Sarah, the niece of one of the authors of the Epistles of Wisdom, Baha'u d-Dīn as-Samuqī ("al-Muqtana Baha’ud-Dīn"). She is remembered for being a great peacemaker. Daher al ahmar biggest families are Bahmad and Jaber

== Archaeological site ==
Some flints were found 500 metres north of the village in the hills including large axes, scrapers and sickle blades with fine denticulation. This was suggested by Jacques Cauvin and Marie-Claire Cauvin to have been a site contemporary with the earliest neolithic levels at Byblos.

== See also ==
- Deir el Ahmar
