= Qasr Chbib =

Roman temples

- قصر شبيب (Arabic)
- Location within Syria
- 33.416667°N 35.85°E
- Cultures: Roman
- Region: al Qunaytirah

Site notes
- Condition: Ruins
- Public access: Yes

Qasr Chbib (Arabic: قصر شبيب, romanized: Qaṣr Shbīb) is a complex of two Roman temples situated a few hundred meters from the summit of Mount Hermon. Officially in the Quneitra District of Syria, web mapping shows the ruins to be in the Hasbaya District of the Nabatieh Governorate in Lebanon.

Both of the sanctuaries have northern walls that were carved out of solid bedrock. The western temple has an area at the back in place of an Adyton that was also hewn out of the rock escarpment. Kevin Butcher suggested that this design was employed to bring the temples "closer to the gods".
