= Kiboreia =

Location known from Greek inscription

Kiboreia is a location that is known from a Greek inscription taken from a large temple at Deir El Aachayer on the northern slopes of Mount Hermon in Lebanon.

The inscription was found noting that a bench was installed "in the year 242, under Beeliabos, also called Diototos, son of Abedanos, high priest of the gods of Kiboreia". Julien Alquot argued that the bench had liturgical uses as a mobile throne. The era of the gods of Kiboreia is not certain, as is their location which is not conclusively to be identified with Deir El Aachayer, but was possibly the Roman sanctuary or the name of a settlement in the area. It has been suggested that the name Kiboreia was formed from the Aramaic word kbr, meaning a "place of great abundance".
