= Masnaa Border Crossing =

International border crossing between Lebanon and Syria

- Coordinates: 33°42′10.32″N 35°55′26.57″E
- Carries: Multiple Lanes of Traffic
- Locale: Lebanon; Syria

Statistics
- Daily traffic: varies

Location
- Interactive map of Masnaa Border Crossing

The Masnaa Border Crossing is an international border crossing between the countries of Lebanon and Syria. It is completely land-based and links the customs checkpoints of Masnaa, Lebanon, and Jdeidat Yabous, Syria. An 8 km no man's land of desolate neutral territory buffers the distance between the border stations. It is the primary crossing point between the countries, linking the capital cities of Beirut and Damascus.

== Recent history ==
The border has been closed many times in its history and has been an ongoing subject of controversy, mostly due to its minor role in Middle Eastern hostilities. On April 29, 2010, a US security delegation visited the crossing, causing concern from the Lebanese Government and Hezbollah militants operating out of Lebanon.

During the Israel–Hezbollah conflict, Israeli airstrikes cut the road to the border crossing. The IDF said that the depth of impact crater strongly hints the existence of an Hezbollah underground tunnel underneath the civilian crossing, similar to those found by Syrian soldiers in April 2026, near the border with Lebanon. An Israel Defense Forces spokesman accused Hezbollah of transporting military equipment into Lebanon through the crossing. This airstrike came after roughly 300,000 people, mostly Syrians, had fled from Lebanon into Syria through this crossing, fleeing Israeli bombardment. The strike rendered the road impassable to cars, though it was still traversable on foot.

During the 2026 Lebanon war, Israel said the border crossing is still used by Hezbollah to smuggle weapons in to Lebanon. It threatened to launch strikes on the border crossing, which was closed following an Israeli evacuation notice. These claims were denied by Lebanon.
