= Khirbet Massakeb =

Coordinates: 32°43′46.1″N 36°36′09.5″E

- خربة مساكب (Arabic)
- Massákeb, Hirbat Masakib
- Location within Syria
- Type: Sanctuary and fortified structure
- Periods: Achaemenid, Hellenistic, Roman
- Cultures: Hellenistic, Roman
- Location: Suwayda Governorate, Syria
- Region: Hauran

History
- Abandoned: late 1st or early 2nd century CE (sanctuary)

Site notes
- Material: Basalt
- Elevation: 1,200 metres (3,900 ft)
- Area: 0.2 hectares (2,000 m^{2})
- Excavation dates: 1998, 1999
- Archaeologists: Michel Kalos; Franck Renel
- Condition: Ruined

Khirbet Massakeb, Hirbat Masakib, or simply Massakeb is an archaeological site in the historical Hauran region of southern Syria, near Suwayda. It comprises several ancient remains, including a reservoir and an adjacent sanctuary with evidence of two construction phases, as well as a fortified structure.

== Location and layout ==
The site sits on the ancient road linking Suwayda and Sīʿ, roughly midway between them. Kermes oak woodland now covers the vicinity, overlying older agricultural area. North of the road lies what could be the ancient hamlet from which the site derives its name.

South of the ancient road is a group of structures situated near a reservoir (birkeh), including a small sanctuary and a large corner-towered building, probably a farmhouse.

== Sanctuary ==
The sanctuary is built within a sacred enclosure (temenos), a rectangle measuring approximately 17 by 19 m, enclosed by double-faced polygonal masonry resting on a foundation course of large basalt blocks. Only the eastern and northern sections of the enclosure wall survive, reaching heights of about 1.7 m and 1.3 m, respectively. An offset entrance, approximately 1.5 m wide, cuts through the eastern wall and was later reinforced from the interior by two buttresses after the masonry began to deteriorate.

The outer face of the gate's northern jamb bears a carved bovine head, while two inscribed stones were once set into it. A paved threshold of small stones leads into the entrance, and the adjacent façade features sun-disc carvings and short Aramaic graffiti. L. Nehmé’s preliminary analysis dates the script to the late 2nd century BCE, comparable to the Aramaic-Hellenistic script attested at Sīʿ; the inscriptions themselves, however, appear to consist only of personal names.

A courtyard with a packed earth floor fills the enclosed space. Pottery and coin evidence point to two separate building phases, divided by a period when the site lay empty.

=== First phase (late 2nd–early 1st century BCE) ===
A monolithic limestone altar, about 40 cm high with a central hollow and drainage groove, stood before the entrance, in front of a structure probably built against the rear wall. Looting disturbed a later destruction layer containing numerous basalt panels carved with geometric motifs (chevrons, crossed lines, wavy lines) and figurative motifs (solar discs, a figure bearing a standard, a bull's head, paired serpents), each within a rectangular frame. Sockets in the blocks suggest they formed a tiered display base; nearby fragments of four damaged stelae and a stone bull may have stood on it, though looting has obscured the original arrangement. Two storerooms of large polygonal stone lay to the north, their lower fill containing jar fragments. Further east along the north wall stood seven standing stones (masseboth, or ansab) in an L-shaped arrangement.

Finds indicate the sanctuary was not in use before the mid-to-late 2nd century BCE. A coin of Antiochus IV Epiphanes (175–164 BCE) from the building levels provides an earliest possible date, supported by pottery combining archaizing local wares of Persian-period tradition with Hellenistic lamps (imported from Ephesus), and by the style of the Aramaic graffiti. Fill and debris layers indicate the building went out of use in the first half of the 1st century BCE.

=== Second phase (1st century CE) ===
During the sanctuary's second phase, a small cella with an apsidal rear wall was built of small, roughly squared blocks over the site of the earlier display platform. The threshold was dressed with metal tools, in contrast to the stone tools used throughout the first phase. The earlier storerooms were backfilled, and the standing stones were covered by fill deposits.

Fragments of a horned altar, a stele bearing a pilaster with a heterodox Corinthian capital (paralleled at the Baalshamin temple and "temple 2" at Sīʿ), and a small naiskos consisting of an arched monumental niche with vine scroll ornament and a winged eagle above the frame are associated with this phase and have parallels dated to the early Roman provincial period. Mazzilli also mentions an altar decorated with eagle reliefs. A refuse deposit, apparently discarded from the adjacent tower, contained pottery from the turn of the era together with two coins of Domitian (minted in Canatha in 94/95 and 96/97 CE), and marks the sanctuary's final abandonment, probably by the end of the 1st or start of the 2nd century CE.

=== Later periods ===
Limited activity resumed during the 6th century CE, before the site was later reused as a nomadic encampment and sheepfold during the medieval and Ottoman periods, following archaeological looting that began in antiquity.

== Tower ==
The enclosure north of the sanctuary shares its southern wall with the sanctuary's northern wall, although the two structures may not have been built as part of the same construction phase. Measuring approximately 40 × 30 m, the enclosure was constructed of double-faced polygonal masonry and featured a glacis. Its interior is divided into a series of rectangular compartments.

Only the glacis-faced tower core has been excavated, and it was heavily looted. Two construction phases were identified. In the first, the tower consisted of a single room roofed around a central pillar and entered through a doorway in the western wall leading into an outer vestibule. During the second phase, the room was divided into two by an east–west partition incorporating the central pillar. Openings in this partition resemble the mangers found in Roman-period houses elsewhere in the Hauran.

Based on material from the tower's foundation levels, Renel dated its construction to the 1st century BCE, suggesting the enclosure may postdate the sanctuary's first phase. Its remodeling likely dates to the early Roman provincial period, with abandonment in the 3rd century CE.

== Research history ==
Excavations were directed by M. Kalos over two seasons in 1998 and 1999, with F. Renel participating in the work.

== See also ==
- Attil, Suwayda
- Qanawat
- Temples of Mount Hermon

== Bibliography ==
=== Sources ===
- Mazzilli, Francesca (2018). Rural Cult Centres in the Hauran: Part of the broader network of the Near East (100 BC–AD 300). Archaeopress. p. 172. doi:10.2307/j.ctvndv916. ISBN 978-1-78491-954-2.
- Rohmer, Jérôme (2020). Hauran VI. La Syrie du Sud de l'âge du Fer à l'annexion romaine (XIIe siècle av. J.-C. – Ier siècle apr. J.-C.). La Bibliothèque archéologique et historique. Vol. 217. Beyrouth: Institut Français du Proche-Orient. pp. 280, 304–309.
