= Ain Aata =

Ain Aata Ain Ata, 'Ain 'Ata, Ayn Aata
- Village
- Interactive map of Ain Aata
- Country: Lebanon
- Governorate: Beqaa Governorate
- District: Rashaya District

Area
  - Total: 22.40 sq mi (58.02 km^{2})
- Elevation: 4,360 ft (1,330 m)

Population
  - Total: around 4,000

Ain Ata
- Ain Aata, 'Ain 'Ata, Ayn Aata
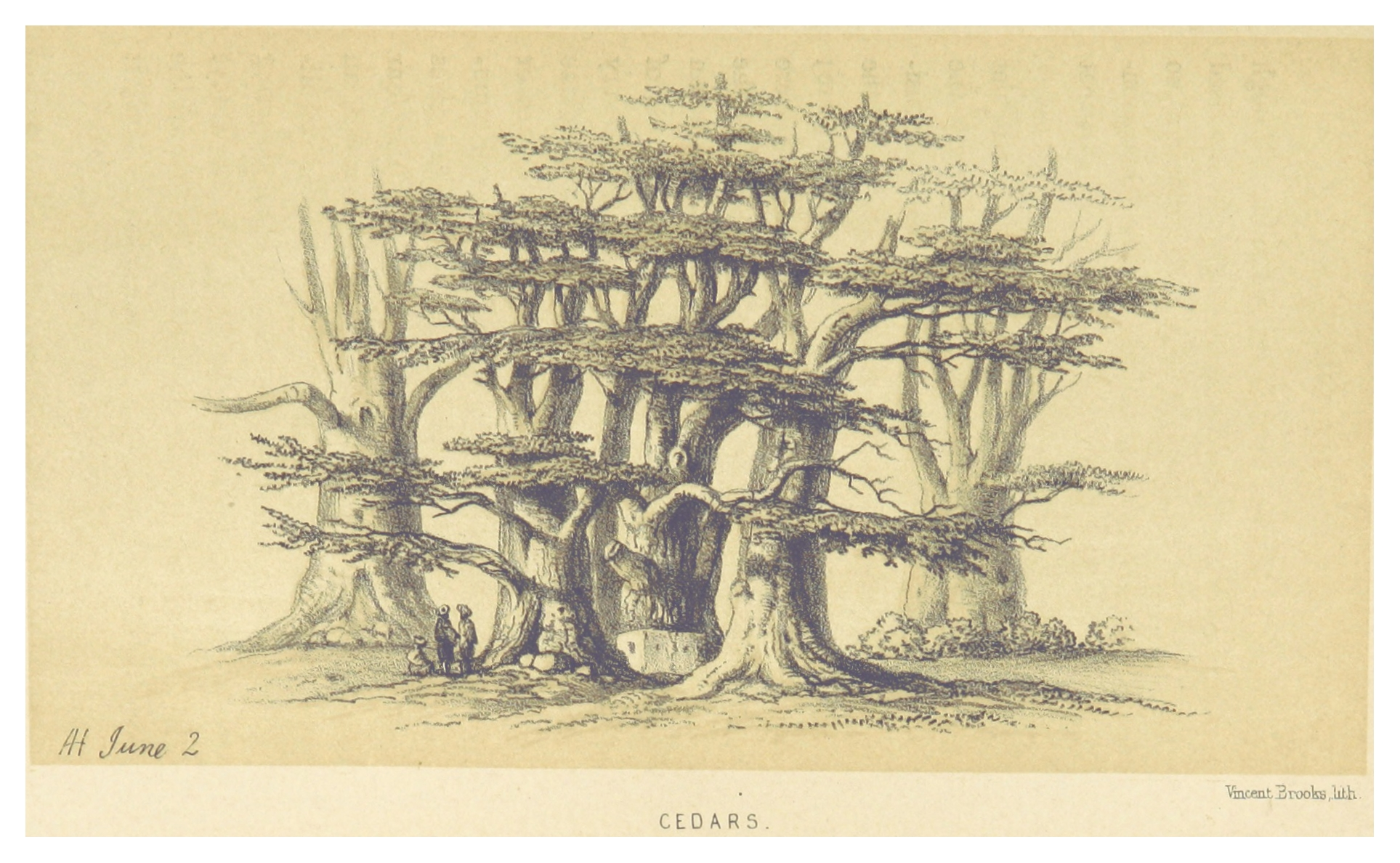
- Cedars, in the hills of Ain Aata (2 June 1860)

- Location within Lebanon
- 33.436390°N 35.779446°E
- Cultures: Roman
- Location: 99 kilometres (62 mi) east of Beirut
- Region: Rashaya

Site notes
- Public access: Yes

Ain Aata (Arabic: عين عطا, romanized: ʿAyn ʿAṭā, also spelled Ain Ata, 'Ain 'Ata or Ayn Aata) is a village and municipality situated southwest of Rashaya, 99 kilometres (62 mi) south-east of Beirut, in the Rashaya District of the Beqaa Governorate in Lebanon.

The name is thought to mean 'gift spring'. There is a remarkably cold spring in the area.

== History ==
In 1838, Eli Smith noted 'Ain 'Ata's population as being Druze and "Greek" Christians. By 2014, Druze residents made up 88.52% of the 1,795 registered voters, with almost all the remainder being Greek Orthodox Christians.

== Roman temple ==
Recent epigraphic surveys have confirmed the ruins of a Roman temple and cult site in the village that are included in the group of Temples of Mount Hermon.

== See also ==
- Oriental Orthodox Christianity in Lebanon

== Bibliography ==
- Harvey, Annie Jane (1861). Our Cruise in the Claymore, with a Visit to Damascus and the Lebanon. Elibron.com. p. 145. ISBN 978-1-4021-3492-0.
- Kaizer, Ted (2008). Aliquot, Julien., Sanctuaries and villages on Mount Hermon in the Roman period in The Variety of Local Religious Life in the Near East in the Hellenistic and Roman Periods. BRILL. p. 76. ISBN 978-90-04-16735-3.
- Mouterde, R. (1951–1952). "Antiquités de l'Hermon et de la Beqâ". Mélanges de l'Université Saint-Joseph. 29: 19–89. doi:10.3406/mefao.1951.1033. S2CID 239122864.
- Robinson, E.; Smith, E. (1841). Biblical Researches in Palestine, Mount Sinai and Arabia Petraea: A Journal of Travels in the year 1838. Vol. 3. Boston: Crocker & Brewster.
- Robinson, E.; Smith, E. (1857). Later Biblical researches in Palestine, and in the adjacent regions: a journal of travels in the year 1852. Crocker and Brewster. p. 438.
- Royal Geographical Society (Great Britain) (1837). The journal of the Royal Geographical Society of London. J. Murray. p. 98.
- Stanley, A.P. (1871). Sinai and Palestine: in connection with their history. J. Murray. pp. 408–.
