= Yanta, Lebanon =

Yanta ينطا
- Village
- Interactive map of Yanta
- Country: Lebanon
- Governorate: Beqaa
- District: Rashaya

Area
  - Total: 12.01 sq mi (31.11 km^{2})
- Elevation: 5,050 ft (1,540 m)

Yanta
- Yanta
- Location within Lebanon
- 33.603056°N 35.944167°E
- Cultures: Roman
- Location: north of Kfar Qouq
- Region: Bekaa Valley

Site notes
- Condition: Ruins
- Public access: Yes

Yanta (Arabic: ينطا, romanized: Yanṭā) is a village situated in Rashaya District, Beqaa Governorate, Lebanon, 79 kilometres (49 mi) from Beirut. It is located close to the Syrian border north of Kfar Qouq. Its inhabitants are Druze.

The village sits about 1,540 metres (5,050 ft) above sea level. The name is variously claimed to mean "God sows" or "God the sower" in Semitic, "white dove" in Syriac and "elevation" in Arabic. It has been noted that a special type of yellow marl (lake sediments) has been noticed in Yanta and the surrounding area dated to the Oxfordian. In 2001 and 2002, archaeological studies were carried out at Kamid al lawz near Yanta that unearthed a large amount of Ancient Greek pottery.

== Roman temple ==
There are ruins of an impressively sized and positioned Roman temple in the area that is presumed to have been built on the site of a forerunning Semitic temple. The ruins lie on either side of the road and are sparse but retain some upright stones. Around the site are remnants of ancient habitation and tombs.

== Notable people ==
Tareck William Saab, Melad Salame
