= Baal-Hermon =

Baal-Hermon (בַּעַל חֶרְמוֹן) is a biblical geographical locale of uncertain boundaries in northern Israel or southern Lebanon, perhaps on Mount Hermon. The area is mentioned in the Book of Judges (Judges 3:3) as not being involved in the invasion of Canaan by the Israelites. It is also mentioned in and 1 Chronicles (1 Chronicles 5:23) as an area occupied by the tribe of Manasseh.

The name Baal-Hermon is suggested to have also been the name of the leader of the tribe of the area. "Baal" means "Lord", in this case of a region known as "Hermon".
