= Deir al-Ashayer =

Deir al-Ashayer دير العشائر
- Village
- Location in Lebanon
- Coordinates: 33°34′31″N 36°0′45″E
- Country: Lebanon
- Governorate: Beqaa Governorate
- District: Rashaya District

Area
  - Total: 26 km^{2} (10 sq mi)

Population (2014)
  - Total: 1,100
- Time zone: UTC+2 (EET)
  - Summer (DST): UTC+3 (EEST)

Deir al-Ashayer (Arabic: دير العشائر) is a Lebanese village located in the Rashaya District of the Beqaa Governorate in Lebanon. It lies near the Lebanon–Syria border, adjacent to a Syrian village with a similar name, Deir al-Ashayer (also known locally as Mazraat Deir al-Ashayer). The two villages are closely connected through social, economic, and historical ties, despite belonging to different countries.

The Lebanese village has a municipal council made up of nine members, and a town mayor. Residents rely on farming as a main source of income, especially grapes, fruit and wheat. Residents also raise and herd sheep and cows, which have been a good source of milk. Farmers in the village have had difficulty selling their products in modern times.

Deir al-Ashayer has a number of local springs, including Ain Halalweh, Ain Shayeb, Ain Rouk, Ain Dibb. The village was once known by the name Deir Mar Sema’an, owing to the Monastery of Saint Simon, known locally as Al Borj, said to have been built by the Romans for preaching, religious ceremonies and practices by disciples of Saint Simon the Baptist. The monastery having been a stronghold for the students, enabling them to expand their teaching in Syria.

== History ==
Deir al-Ashayer, a village in Lebanon near the Syrian border, has played a significant role in regional politics due to its geographic and historical ties to Syria. The village is predominantly Druze with Sunni minority, while the adjacent Syrian village of the same name is Sunni, leading to distinct but interconnected social dynamics.

During the 20th century, the village was involved in key political movements. During the 1958 Lebanon crisis, Deir al-Ashayer served as a key base for Kamal Jumblatt's Progressive Socialist Party (PSP), facilitating arms and personnel movement from Syria in support of the rebellion. The village was later targeted in a 1972 Israeli airstrike that killed 16 civilians, including children – a significant loss for its then-small population of around 250.

Historically, the village relied on Syria for trade, healthcare, and education, particularly during winter when snow blocked access to Lebanese towns. However, the Syrian civil war disrupted these ties, leading to stricter border controls and economic decline. Despite sectarian differences, social and commercial links between the Lebanese and Syrian villages persisted, including shared labor in agriculture and mutual support during communal events.

In December 2024, Lebanese MP Wael Abou Faour met with residents of both Deir al-Ashayer and its Syrian counterpart. He praised the Lebanese Army's role in maintaining stability and announced plans to upgrade the local clinic, reflecting ongoing efforts to address the village's isolation. Abou Faour also expressed hope for democratic reforms in Syria, framing them as beneficial for Lebanon's security.

== Location and border status ==
Deir al-Ashayer is situated near the internationally disputed border area between Lebanon and Syria. There is no fully formalized border demarcation between the two countries in this region, leading to overlapping claims and ambiguity regarding exact administrative boundaries.

Lebanese sources place Deir al-Ashayer within Rashaya District, Beqaa Governorate. Conversely, Syrian sources classify the similarly named village as part of Qatana District in Rif Dimashq Governorate according to the Syria Central Bureau of Statistics (CBS), although a 2021 report by the Syrian Arab News Agency (SANA) identified is as part of Al-Zabadani District.

The ambiguous border status has historically influenced administrative oversight and security arrangements in the area, with the Lebanese Army currently exercising authority over the Lebanese side.

== Demographics ==
The village is home to approximately 1,100 Lebanese citizens. The Lebanese side of the village is predominantly Druze with Sunni muslim minority, while the Syrian counterpart is mostly Sunni Muslim. This religious difference limits intermarriage between the two communities despite strong social and economic interactions across the border.

== Roman temple ==
Deir al-Ashayer Temple
- Location within Lebanon
- 33.589181°N 36.019169°E
- Cultures: Greek, Roman
- Location: near Rashaya
- Region: Bekaa Valley

History
- Built by: Romans

Site notes
- Material: Stone
- Length: 30 metres (98 ft)
- Condition: Ruins
- Public access: Yes

The village is near to the remains of a substantial Graeco-Roman style temple dedicated to unknown deities, with 30 metres (98 ft) long foundations and columns re-used in local construction. A Greek inscription was found noting that a bench was installed "in the year 242, under Beeliabos, also called Diototos, son of Abedanos, high priest of the gods of Kiboreia". Julien Alquot argued that the bench had liturgical uses as a mobile throne. The era of the gods of Kiboreia is not certain, as is their location, which is not conclusively to be identified with Deir al-Ashayer, but was possibly the Roman sanctuary or the name of a settlement in the area. It has been suggested that the name Kiboreia was formed from the Aramaic word kbr, meaning a "place of great abundance".

== See also ==
- List of territorial disputes

== Bibliography ==
- Warren, C.; Conder, C.R. (1884). The Survey of Western Palestine: Jerusalem. London: Committee of the Palestine Exploration Fund. (pp. 497-498)
