= Mount Hermon =

Mountain range in Syria and Lebanon

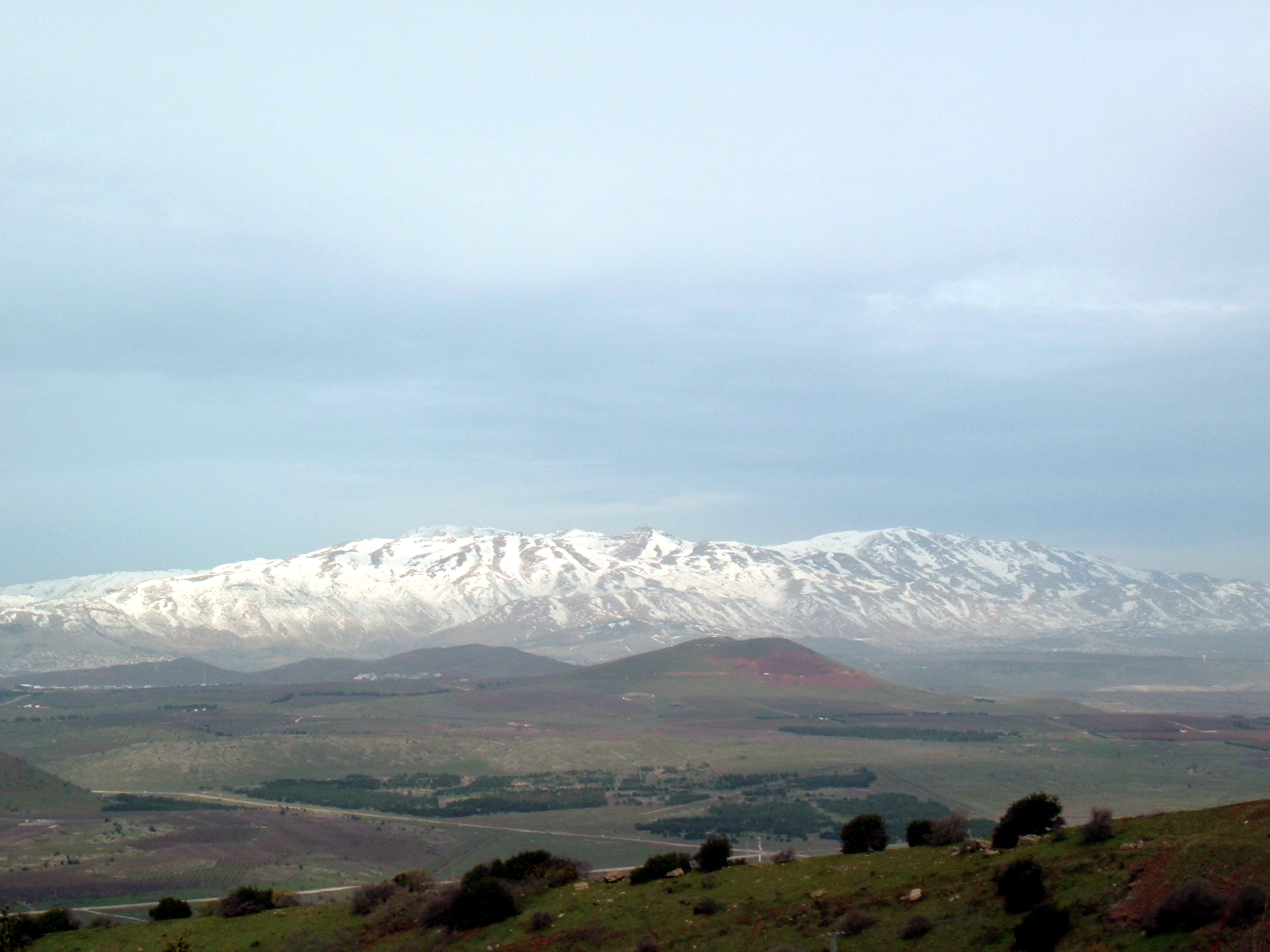
- Mount Hermon viewed from Mount Bental in the Golan Heights

Highest point
- Elevation: 2,814 m (9,232 ft)
- Prominence: 1,804 m (5,919 ft)
- Listing: Country high point; Mountains in the Golan Heights; Ultra
- Coordinates: 33°24′58″N 35°51′27″E

Naming
- Native name: جبل الشيخ (Arabic)

Geography
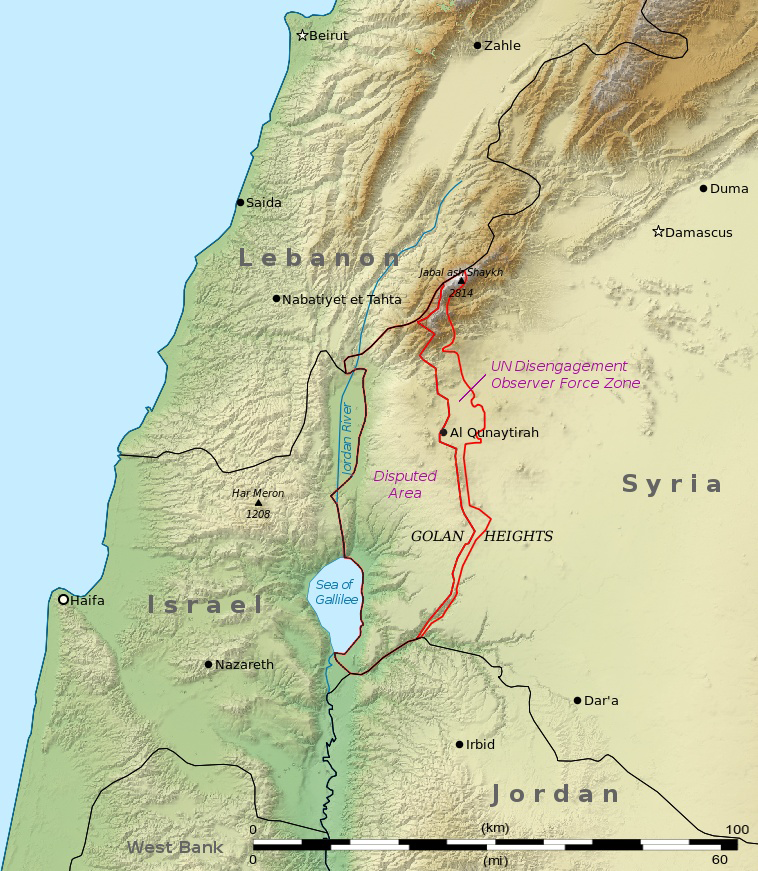
- Location within Syria and Lebanon Location within Golan Heights
- Location: Syria (Note: The southern slopes and summit are Israeli-occupied since 1967 and 2024 respectively.); Lebanon
- Parent range: Anti-Lebanon mountain range

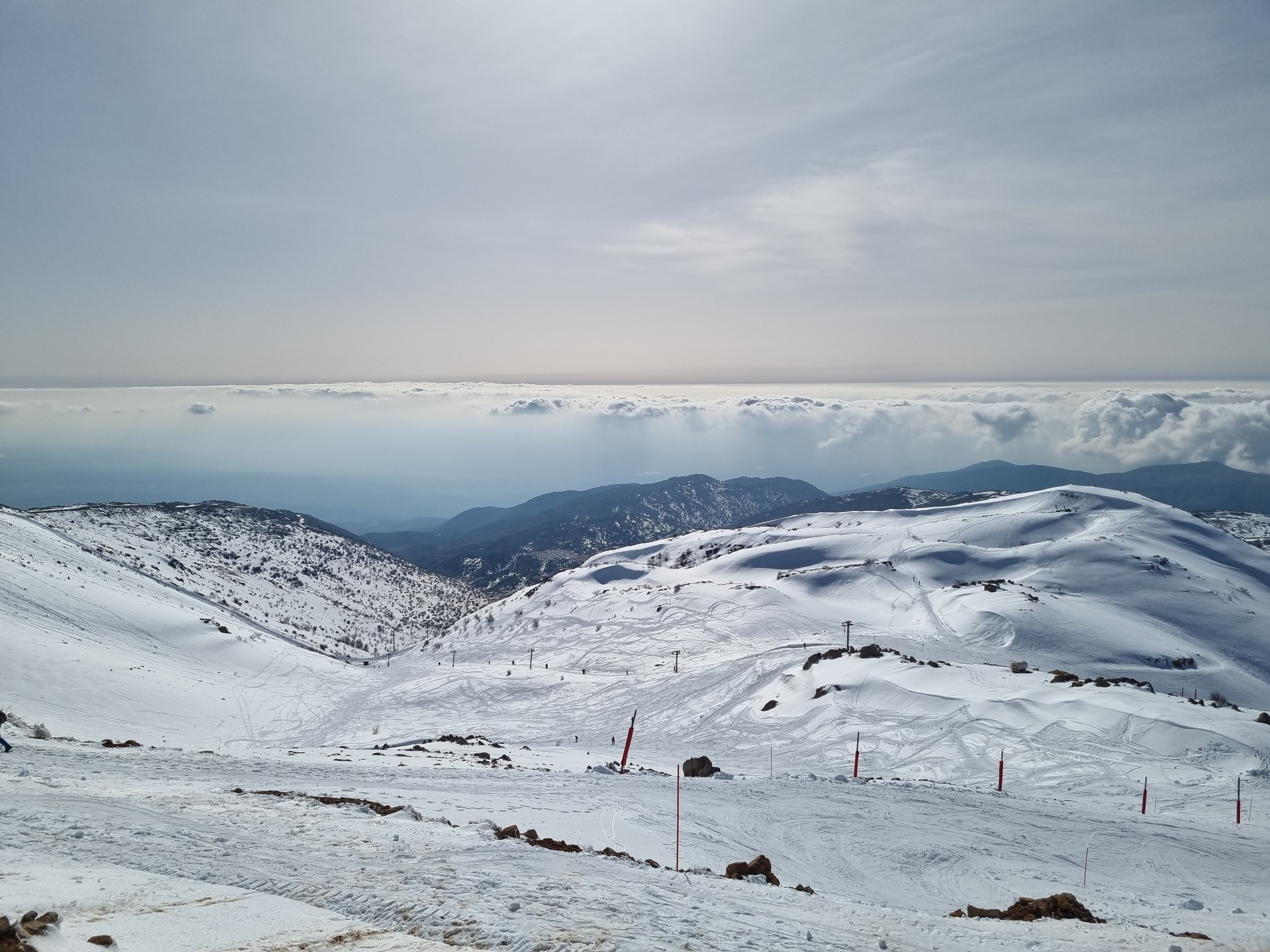
Winter view in the Hermon

Mount Hermon (/ˈhɜːrmən/) (Note: Arabic: جَبَل الشَّيْخ, romanized: Jabal al-Shaykh, Levantine Arabic pronunciation: [ʒabal eʃ.ʃeːx], meaning 'Mountain of the Sheikh'; Hebrew: הַר חֶרְמוֹן, romanized: Har Ḥermōn, Israeli Hebrew pronunciation: [haʁ χeʁˈmon].) is a mountain cluster constituting the southern end of the Anti-Lebanon Mountains. Its summit straddles the border between Syria and Lebanon and at the elevation of 2,814 m (9,232 ft), is the highest point in Syria and the Israeli-occupied Golan Heights.

On the top, in the United Nations buffer zone between Syrian and Israeli-occupied territories, is the highest permanently manned UN position in the world, known as "Hermon Hotel", located at 2,814 metres (9,232 ft). The southern slopes of Mount Hermon extend to the Israeli-occupied portion of the Golan Heights, where the Mount Hermon ski resort is located with a top elevation of 2,040 metres (6,690 ft).

== Geography ==
=== Wider mountain range ===
The Anti-Lebanon range, of which the Hermon range constitutes the southernmost part, extends for approximately 150 km (93 mi) in a northeast–southwest direction, running parallel to the Lebanon range on the west.

=== Hermon range ===
The relatively narrow Hermon range, with the Lebanon-Syria boundary along its spine, extends for 70 km (43 mi), from 25 km (16 mi) northeast of Mt. Hermon to 45 km (28 mi) southwest of it. The Hermon range covers an area of about 700 km^{2} (270 mi^{2}) of which about 70 km^{2} (27 sq mi) are under Israeli control. Mount Hermon is a cluster of mountains with three distinct summits, each about the same height. Most of the portion of Mount Hermon within the Israeli-controlled area constitutes the Hermon nature reserve.

=== Water and flora ===
The mountain forms one of the greatest geographic resources of the area. Because of its height it captures a great deal of precipitation in a very dry area of the world. The Jurassic limestone is broken by faults and solution channels to form a karst topography. Mount Hermon has seasonal winter and spring snow falls, which cover all three of its peaks for most of the year. Melt water from the snow-covered mountain's western and southern bases seeps into the rock channels and pores, feeding springs at the base of the mountain, which form streams and rivers. These merge to become the Jordan River.

The runoff facilitates fertile plant life below the snow line, where vineyards and pine, oak, and poplar trees are abundant. Two Jewish liturgical poems from the 8th and 10th centuries indicate that vineyards were cultivated in the Hermon area during the early medieval period.

=== Strategic importance ===
The springs, and the mountain itself, are much contested by the nations of the area for the use of the water. Mount Hermon is also called the "snowy mountain", the "gray-haired mountain", and the "mountain of snow". It is also called "the eyes of the nation" in Israel because its elevation makes it Israel's primary strategic early warning system.

== Religious significance ==
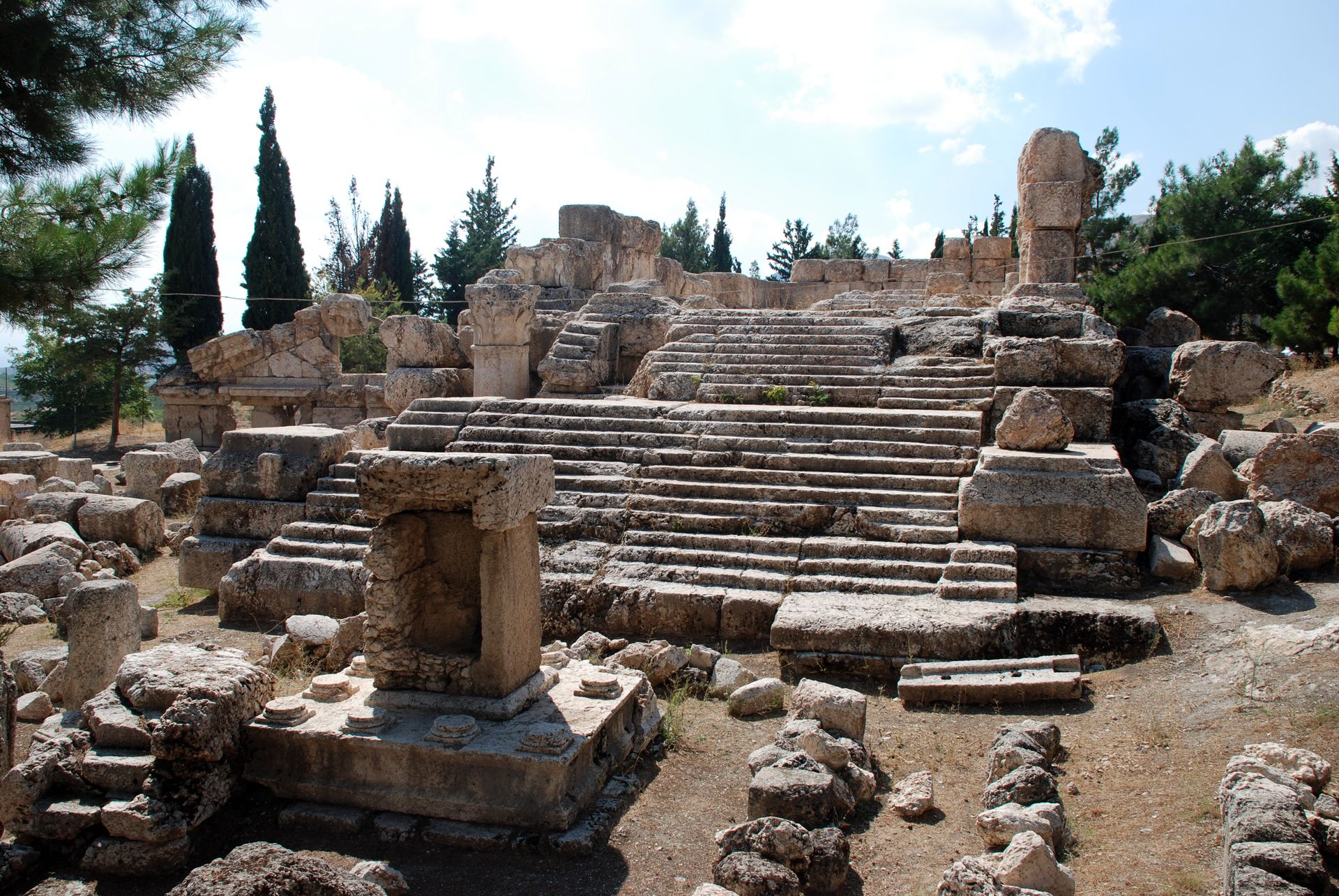
Roman temple of Qasr el Banat, Lebanon

Various temples can be found in villages on the slopes of Mount Hermon.

Mount Hermon's name has been related to the Semitic root ḥrm, which means "taboo" or "consecrated", as in Hebrew ḥerem (in several contexts: property, priestly gift and censure), and in the Arabic term al-ḥaram, which means "sacred enclosure". The name Hermon does not appear in texts prior to the Bible, but other names of the mountain (Siryon and Senir), which are mentioned in the Bible, appear in Bronze- and Iron-Age texts.

=== Execration texts ===
in the Egyptian execration texts from the 19th century BC, šrynw (Siryon) is mentioned.

=== Epic of Gilgamesh ===
The Epic of Gilgamesh mentions that Mount Hermon split after Gilgamesh killed Humbaba, the Guardian of the Cedar Forest. One translation of Tablet V states, "The ground split open with the heels of their feet, as they whirled around in circles Mt. Hermon and Lebanon split."

One of the versions of the Epic of Gilgamesh mentions ša-ri-a ù la-ab-na-na – Siryon and Lebanon – as the place of Anunnaki. This indicates Amorite influence.

=== Hittite contract ===
In the contract between Muršili II and Duppi-Teššup of Amurru, two of the mountains that appear among the gods that witness the alliance are Lebanon and Siryon (šá-ri-ya-nu).

=== Ugaritic religion ===
In the Ugaritic Baal Cycle, tablet KTU 1.4 IV, Baal goes "to Lebanon and his trees, Siryon – his desired cedars" for construction materials.

The mountain or summit is referred to as Saphon in Ugaritic texts where the palace of Ba'al is located in a myth about Attar.

=== Assyrian royal inscriptions ===
In the royal inscriptions of Shalmaneser III, Shalmaneser wrote that Hazael fortified the peak of mount sa-ni-ru (Senir) "which is before mount Lebanon", and that after the defeat of Hazael, Shalmaneser marched to the Hauran. In another part, Shalmaneser wrote that in his way from mount Lebanon to the cities of Hazael, he passed mount Saniru.

The inscriptions of Esarhaddon mention several times cedars and cypresses from the mountains Lebanon and Sirara as construction materials; Sirara may be a version of Siryon.

=== Hebrew Bible and apocrypha ===
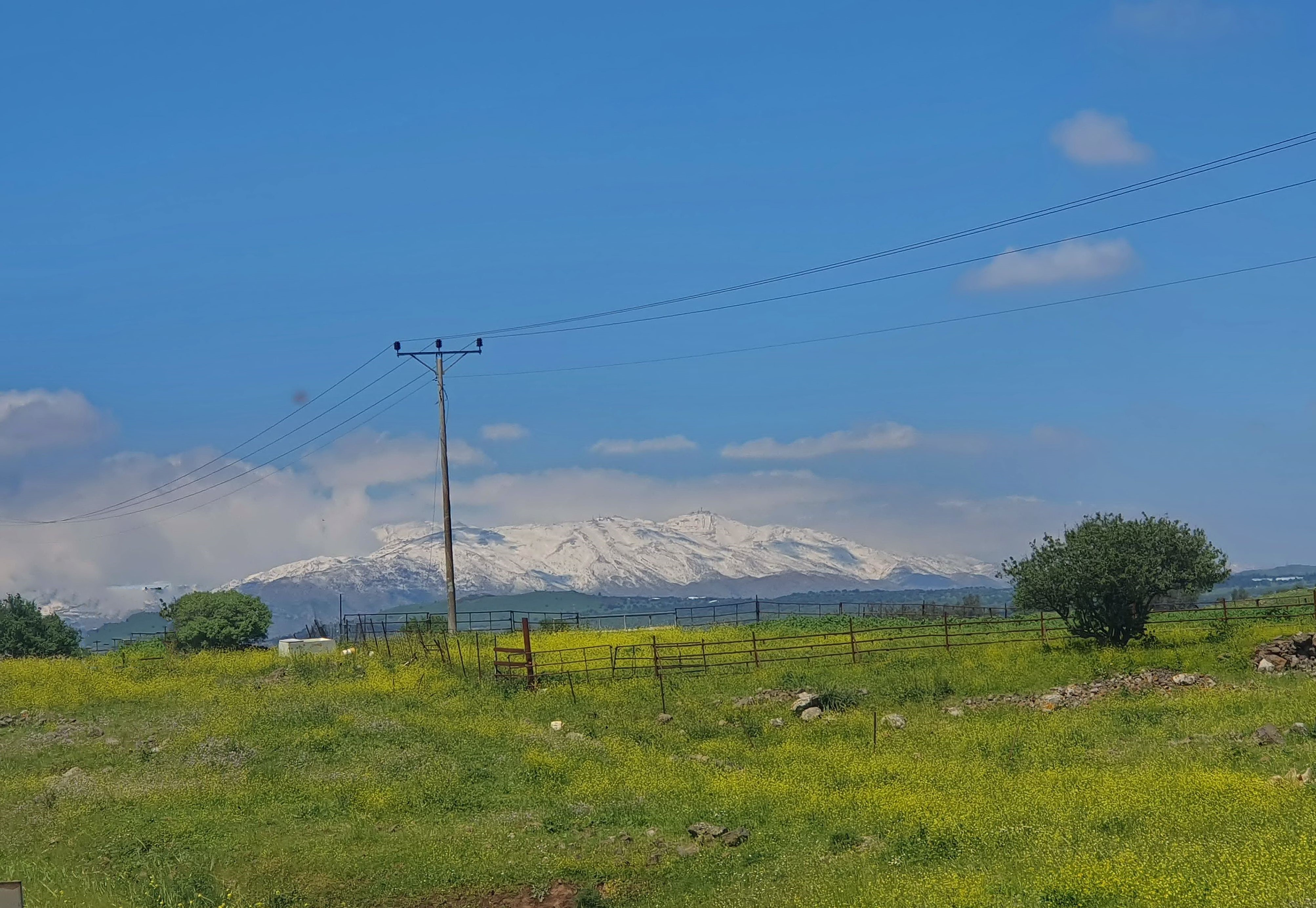
Hermon in the spring, viewed from the Golan heights

In Deuteronomy 3:8–9 and Joshua 12:1 and 13:11, Mount Hermon is depicted as the northern boundary of the Amorite kingdom, which following the conquest by Joshua was awarded to the half-tribe of Manasseh east of the Jordan River.

The Hebrew Bible uses three names for Mount Hermon, stating in Deut 3:9 that "the Sidonians call Hermon Siryon, while the Amorites call it Senir", but elsewhere (1Chr 5:23) seems to distinguish between Senir and Hermon, probably using the names for two of the three peaks of the Hermon range, while in Psalm 42:6 the Hebrew text uses the plural form, Hermonim, possibly also a reference to the three peaks.

The pair Siryon and Lebanon appears in Psalm 29, which is considered by Scholars to have Canaanite origin or roots.

The Book of Chronicles mentions Mount Hermon as a place where Epher, Ishi, Eliel, Azriel, Jeremiah, Hodaviah, and Jahdiel were the heads of their families (1 Chronicles 5:23-24).

In Psalm 42, which leads the Psalms of the northern kingdom, the Psalmist remembers God from the land of Jordan and the Hermonites. In Song of Songs 4:8, Hermon is an instance of an exotic locale, and Psalm 133, one of the Songs of Ascents, makes specific reference to the abundant dew formation upon Mount Hermon. The Book of Ezekiel (27:5), meanwhile, praises its cypresses (referring to it by its alternate name, Senir (cf. Deut. 3:9)).

In the apocryphal Book of Enoch, Mount Hermon is the place where the Watcher class of fallen angels descended to Earth. They swear upon the mountain that they would take wives among the daughters of men and take mutual imprecation for their sin (Enoch 6).

According to the controversial research by Professor Israel Knohl of the Hebrew University, in his book Hashem, Mount Hermon is actually the Mount Sinai mentioned in the Hebrew Bible, with the biblical story reminiscent of an ancient battle of the northern tribes with the Egyptians somewhere in the Jordan Valley or Golan Heights.

=== New Testament ===
R.T. France, in his book on the Gospel of Matthew, noted that Mount Hermon was a possible location of the Transfiguration of Jesus, just as it has elsewhere been described as the site accepted by most scholars.

=== Qasr Antar inscription and Hermon as the "mountain of oath" ===
There is a sacred building made of hewn blocks of stone on the summit of Mount Hermon. Known as Qasr Antar, it is the highest temple of the ancient world and was documented by Sir Charles Warren in 1869. An inscription on a limestone stele recovered by Warren from Qasr Antar was translated by George Nickelsburg to read "According to the command of the greatest a(nd) Holy God, those who take an oath (proceed) from here." Nickelsburg connected the inscription with the oath taken by the angels under Semjaza who took an oath together, bound by a curse, in order to take human wives in the Book of Enoch (1 Enoch 6:6). Hermon was said to have become known as "the mountain of oath" by Charles Simon Clermont-Ganneau. The name of God was supposed to be a Hellenized version of Baʿal or Hadad and Nickelsburg connected it with the place name of Baal-Hermon (Lord of Hermon) and the deity given by Enoch as "The Great Holy One".

=== Deir El Aachayer Roman temple ===
Another Greek inscription found in a large temple at Deir El Aachayer on the northern slopes notes the year that a bench was installed "in the year 242, under Beeliabos, also called Diototos, son of Abedanos, high priest of the gods of Kiboreia". The era of the gods of Kiboreia is not certain, nor is their location, which is not conclusively to be identified with Deir al-Achayer, but was possibly the Roman sanctuary or the name of a settlement in the area.

=== Religious importance in the Late Roman period ===
Eusebius recognized the religious importance of Hermon in his work Onomasticon (probably written in the first quarter of the 4th century), saying "Until today, the mount in front of Banias and Lebanon is known as Hermon and it is respected by nations as a sanctuary."

== Climate ==
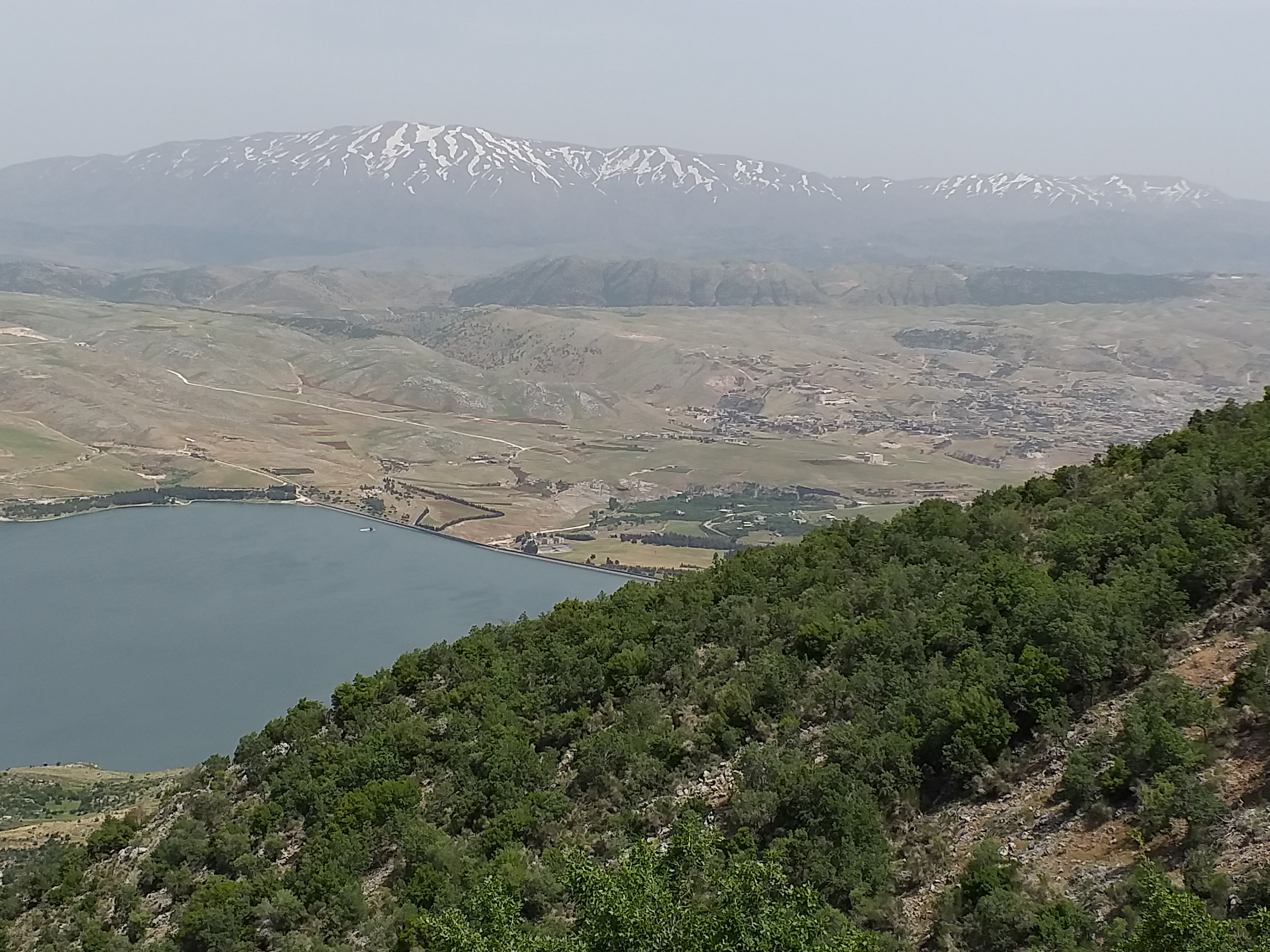
Mount Hermon and Lake Qaraoun

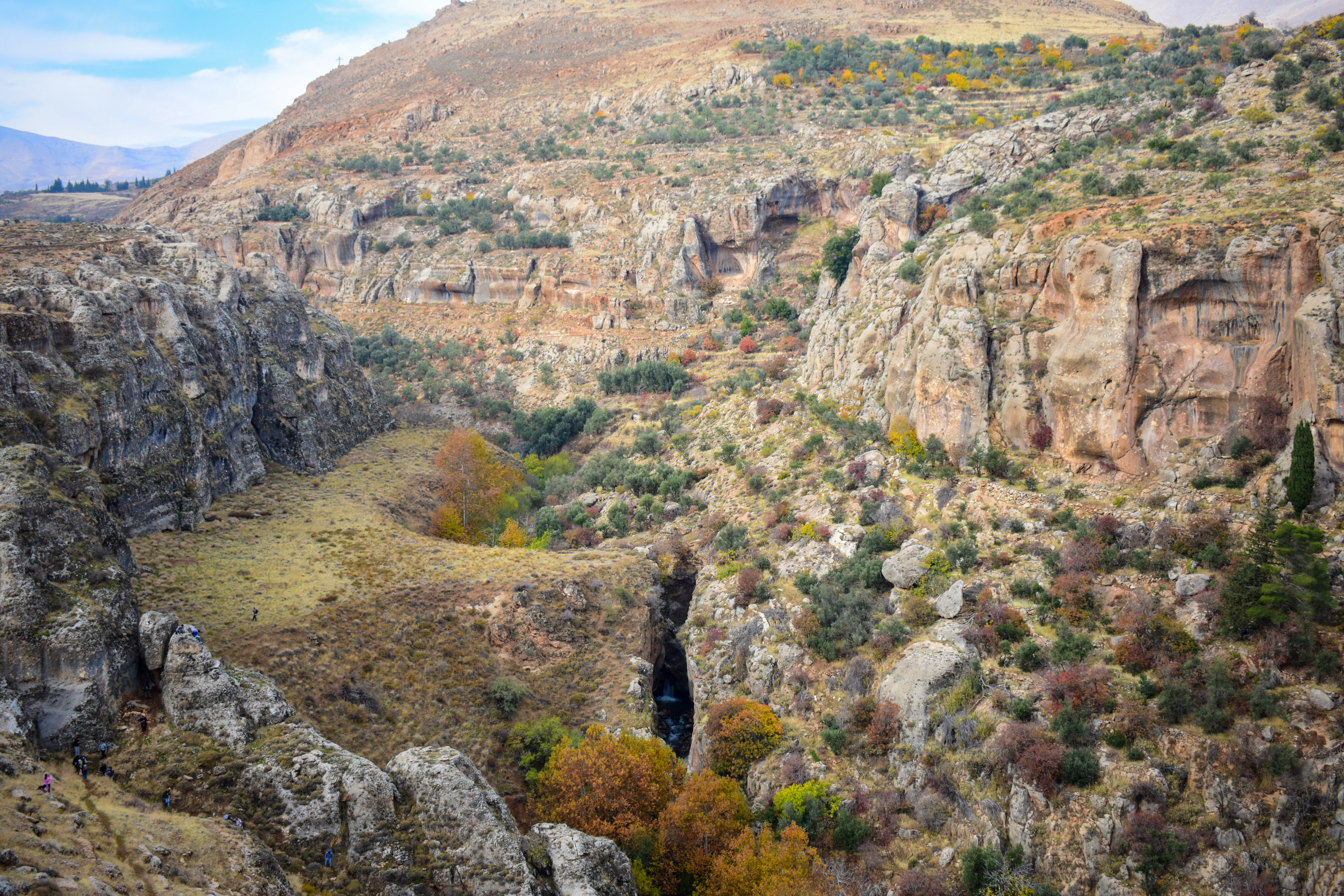
A spring in the Hermon

According to the Köppen climate classification, the weather station at Mount Hermon features a warm-summer Mediterranean climate (Csb). The climate might also more specifically be described as oro-Mediterranean (CsbH). Its temperature range is relatively narrow, while its yearly variation in precipitation is very wide; with mild, rainless summers, and chilly, very wet and often snowy winters.

The peak, at 2,814 m (9,232 ft), has a Mediterranean-influenced warm-summer humid continental climate (Koppen: Dsb).

Climate data for Hermon (1,640 metres (5,380 ft) above sea level)
Month	Jan	Feb	Mar	Apr	May	Jun	Jul	Aug	Sep	Oct	Nov	Dec	Year
Mean daily maximum °C (°F)	3.3 (37.9)	4.0 (39.2)	7.6 (45.7)	12.0 (53.6)	16.0 (60.8)	19.4 (66.9)	21.6 (70.9)	21.7 (71.1)	19.1 (66.4)	15.3 (59.5)	10.2 (50.4)	5.1 (41.2)	12.9 (55.3)
Daily mean °C (°F)	1.2 (34.2)	1.9 (35.4)	4.1 (39.4)	7.5 (45.5)	11.2 (52.2)	14.5 (58.1)	16.8 (62.2)	16.7 (62.1)	14.3 (57.7)	11.2 (52.2)	7.0 (44.6)	3.3 (37.9)	9.1 (48.5)
Mean daily minimum °C (°F)	−2.2 (28.0)	−3.1 (26.4)	0.6 (33.1)	3.1 (37.6)	6.4 (43.5)	9.6 (49.3)	12.0 (53.6)	11.8 (53.2)	9.5 (49.1)	7.2 (45.0)	2.7 (36.9)	−0.5 (31.1)	4.8 (40.6)
Average rainfall mm (inches)	300.3 (11.82)	250.4 (9.86)	138.8 (5.46)	100.2 (3.94)	30.2 (1.19)	7.5 (0.30)	1.7 (0.07)	0.9 (0.04)	10.4 (0.41)	110.6 (4.35)	175.3 (6.90)	226.5 (8.92)	1,352.8 (53.26)
Average rainy days	20.8	19.3	11.5	8.8	5.8	2.3	0.7	0.6	3.5	11.2	15.5	18.9	118.9

== Arab-Israeli conflict ==
=== 1967 Six-Day War ===
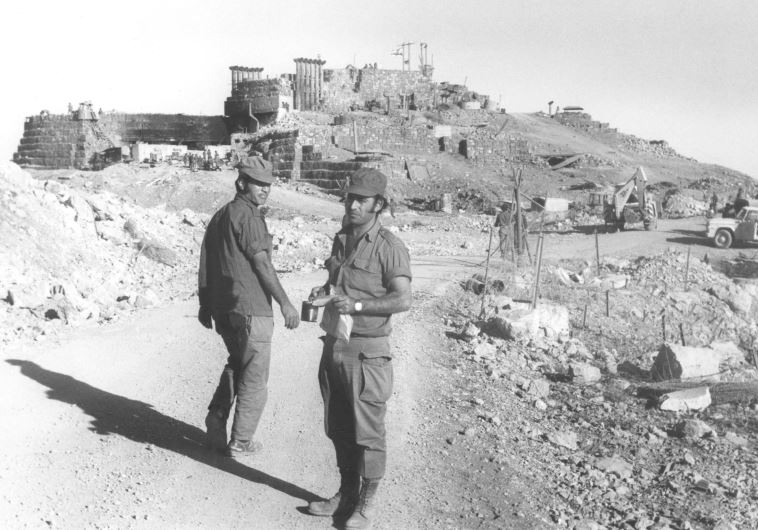
Israeli soldiers after the recapture of their outpost in the Syrian part of Mount Hermon, October 1973

During the Six-Day War in June 1967, a part of Mount Hermon in Syria was captured by Israel.

=== 1973 Yom Kippur War ===
This part was regained by Syria on October 6, 1973, the first day of the Yom Kippur War, following the First Battle of Mount Hermon. After being repelled in the Second Battle of Mount Hermon, the IDF recaptured both the formerly Israeli-occupied sector and the pre-Yom Kippur War Syrian-controlled sector on October 21, 1973, during Operation Dessert, also known as the Third battle of Mount Hermon.

=== 1974–2024 ===
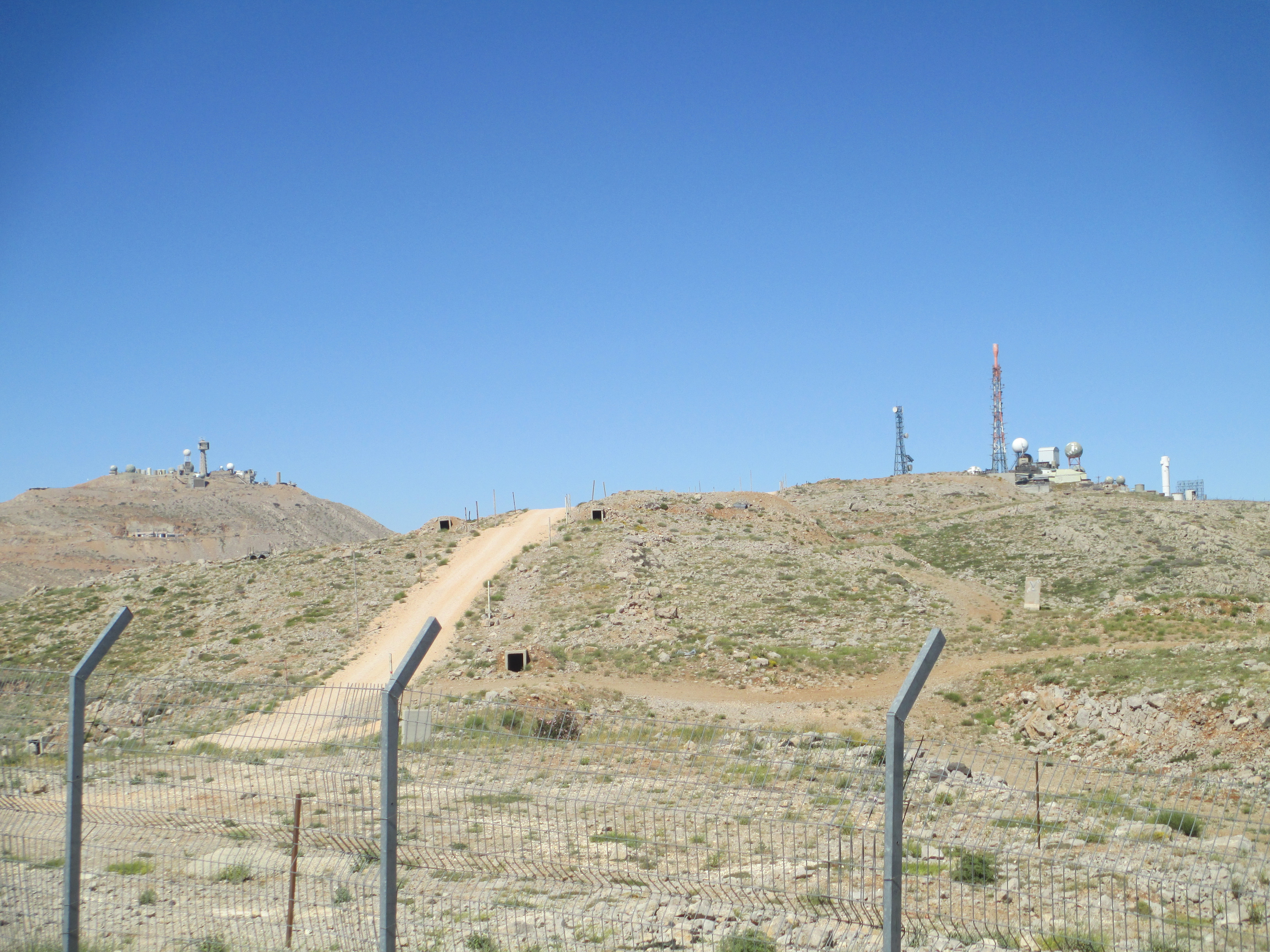
Snow and Horan lookposts in the Israeli-occupied sector, June 2014

The pre-Yom Kippur War Syrian-controlled sector was returned to Syria after the war.

The Israeli-occupied sector of the mountain became patrolled by the Israel Defense Forces and the Israel Police, and the Israeli Security Forces have maintained a strategic observation post for monitoring Syrian and Lebanese military activity near Mitzpe Shlagim ("Snow Lookout"), which is at an elevation of about 2,224 m (7,297 ft). Its neighboring peak, at 2,236 m (7,336 ft), is the highest elevation in Israeli-controlled territory, and is called Mitzpe Hashlagim by Israel.

=== 2024 ===
After the fall of the Assad regime in Syria due to the opposition offensives, on December 8, 2024, Israeli forces took over the summit of Mount Hermon (Jabal El-Sheikh outpost) on the same day.

== Ski resort ==
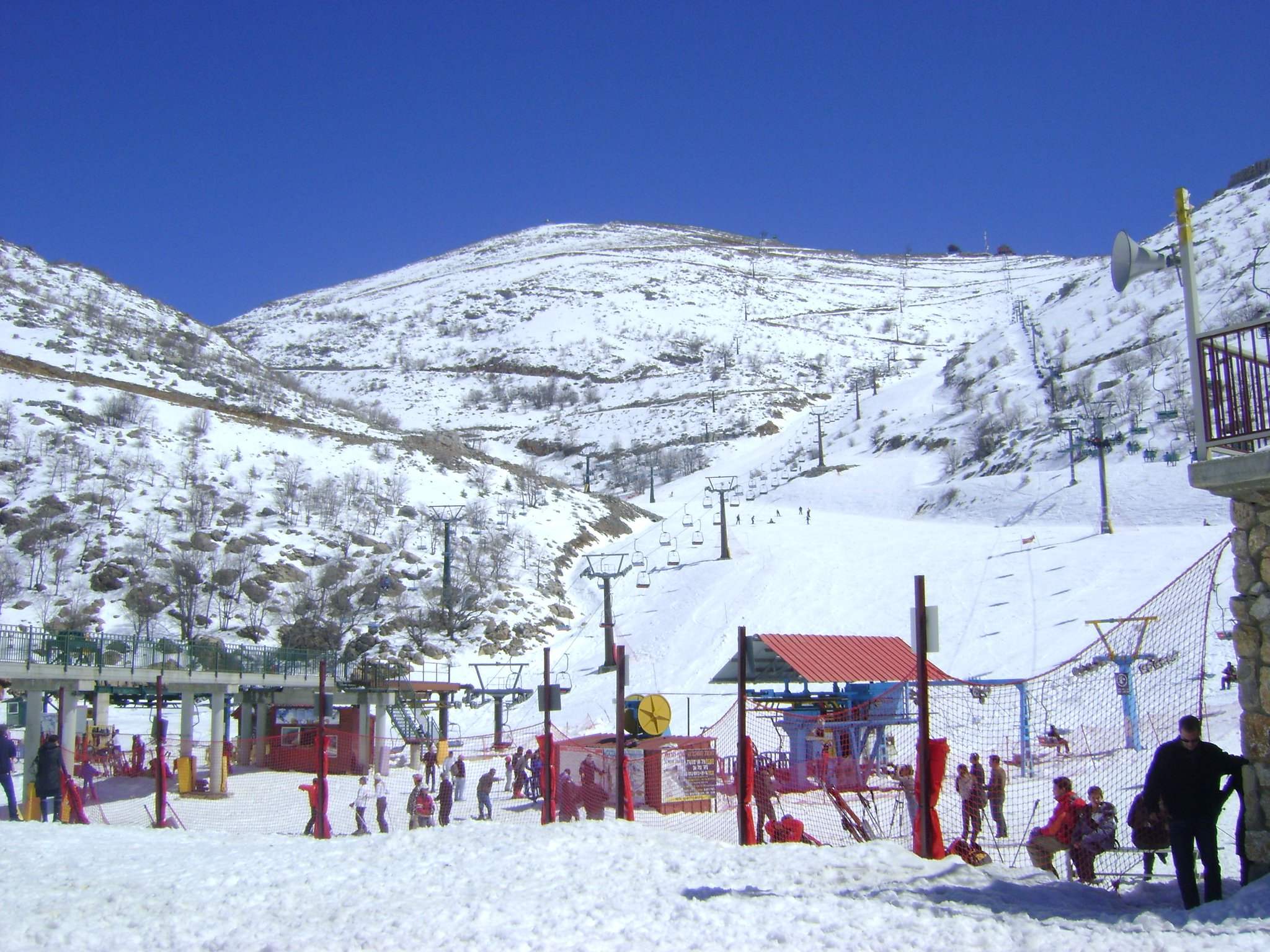
The Mount Hermon ski resort on the Syrian slopes of the mountain, annexed by Israel

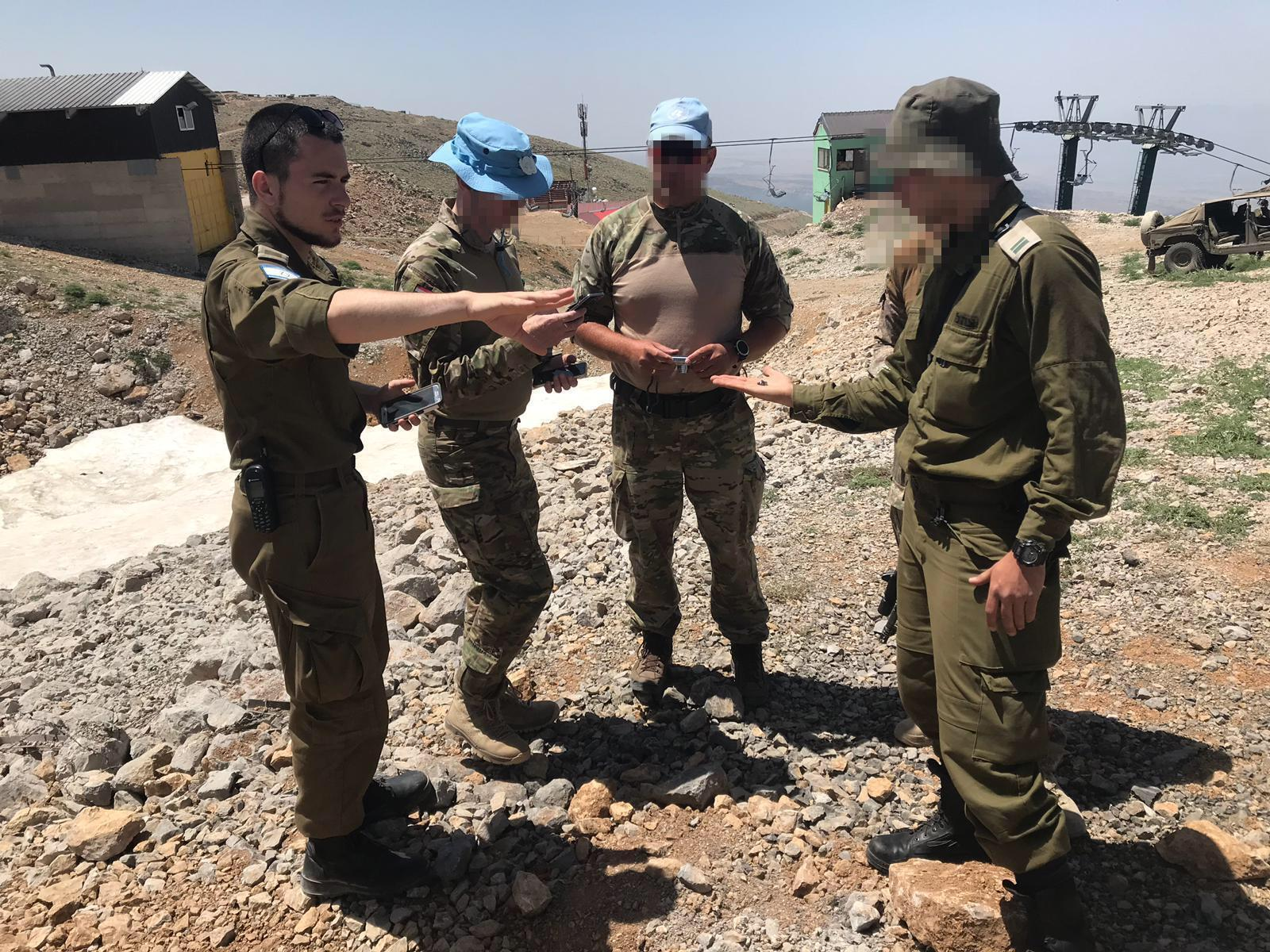
Israeli soldiers at the ski resort, November 2019

Since 1981, when the Golan Heights Law was passed, the Israeli-occupied portion of the Golan Heights has been governed under Israeli law. Mount Hermon hosts the only ski resort in territory controlled by Israel, including a wide range of ski trails at novice, intermediate, and expert levels. It also offers additional winter family activities such as sledding and Nordic skiing. Since 1972, the Hermon Ski area has been operated by the residents of the nearby Israeli settlement of Neve Ativ. Workers at the resort come from Neve Ativ and the Druze town of Majdal Shams. The ski resort has a ski school, ski patrol, and several restaurants located at either the bottom or peak of the area.

In 2005, the Syrian government had plans to develop a 15-billion-dollar ski resort on the slopes of the mountain.

== See also ==
- List of mountains in Lebanon
- Hermon nature reserve
- List of elevation extremes by country
- Iris hermona
