= Rashaya District =

Coordinates: 33.5024°N 35.8462°E

- District
- قضاء راشيا
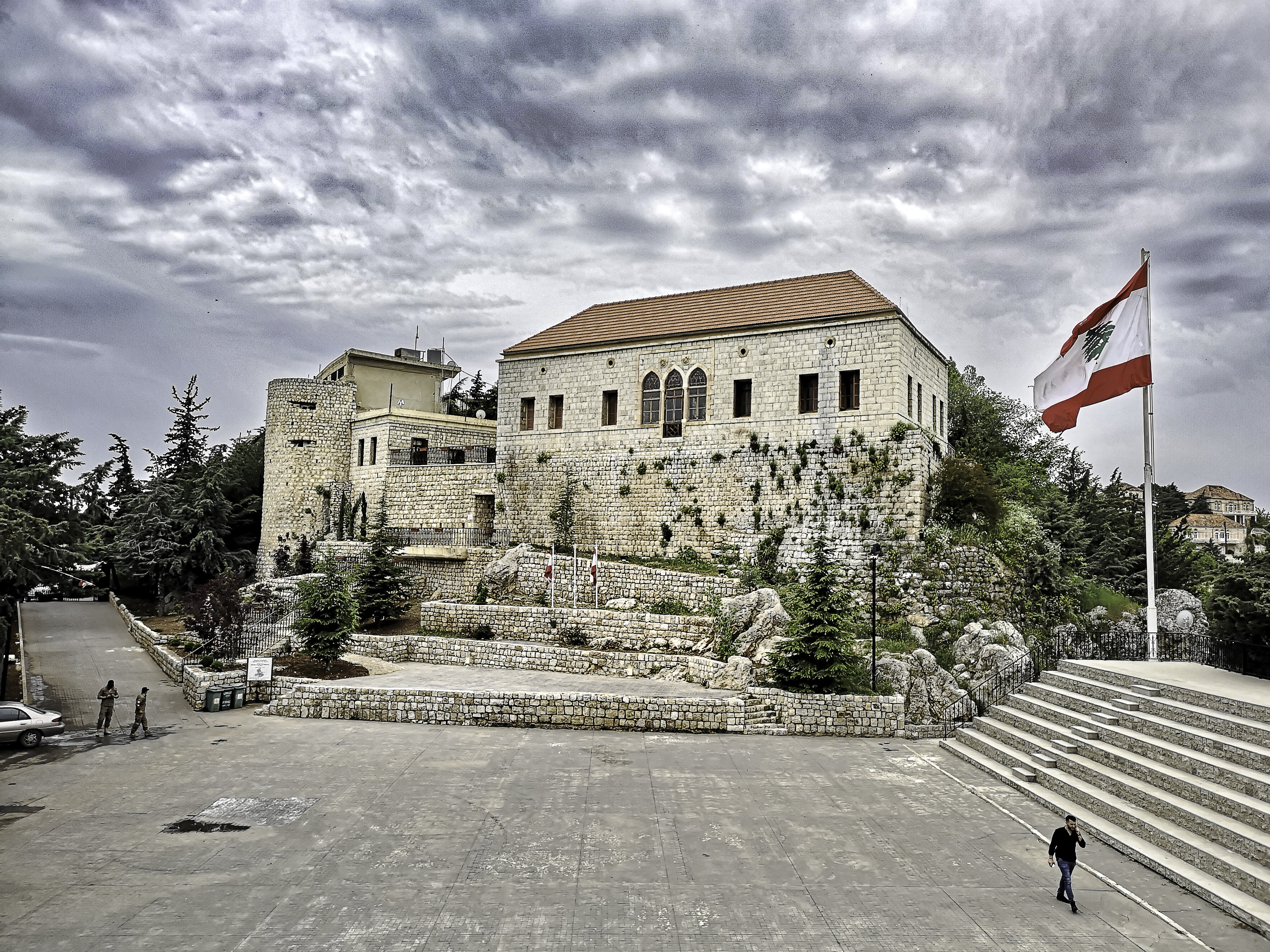
- Rashaya Citadel

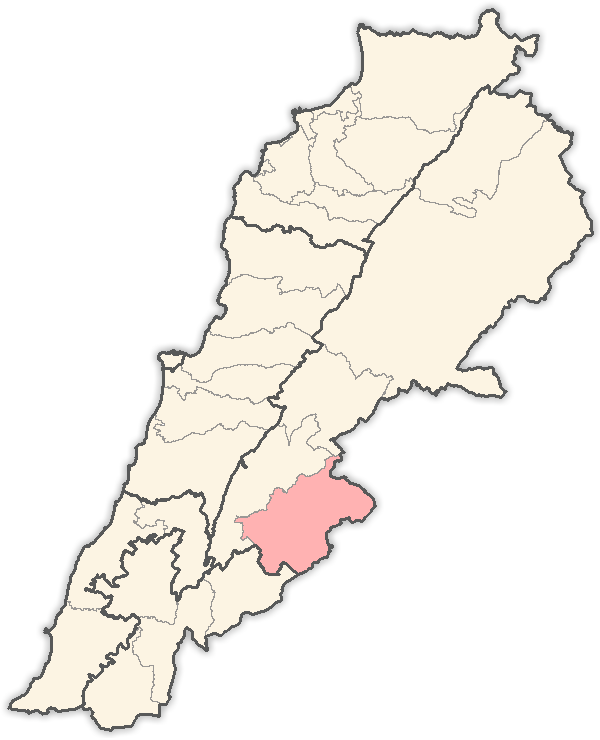
- Location in Lebanon
- Country: Lebanon
- Governorate: Beqaa Governorate
- Capital: Rashaya

Area
  - Total: 187 sq mi (485 km^{2})

Population
  - Estimate (31 December 2017): 47,122
- Time zone: UTC+2 (EET)
  - Summer (DST): UTC+3 (EEST)

Rashaya District (Arabic: قضاء راشيا) is an administrative district in the Beqaa Governorate of the Republic of Lebanon.

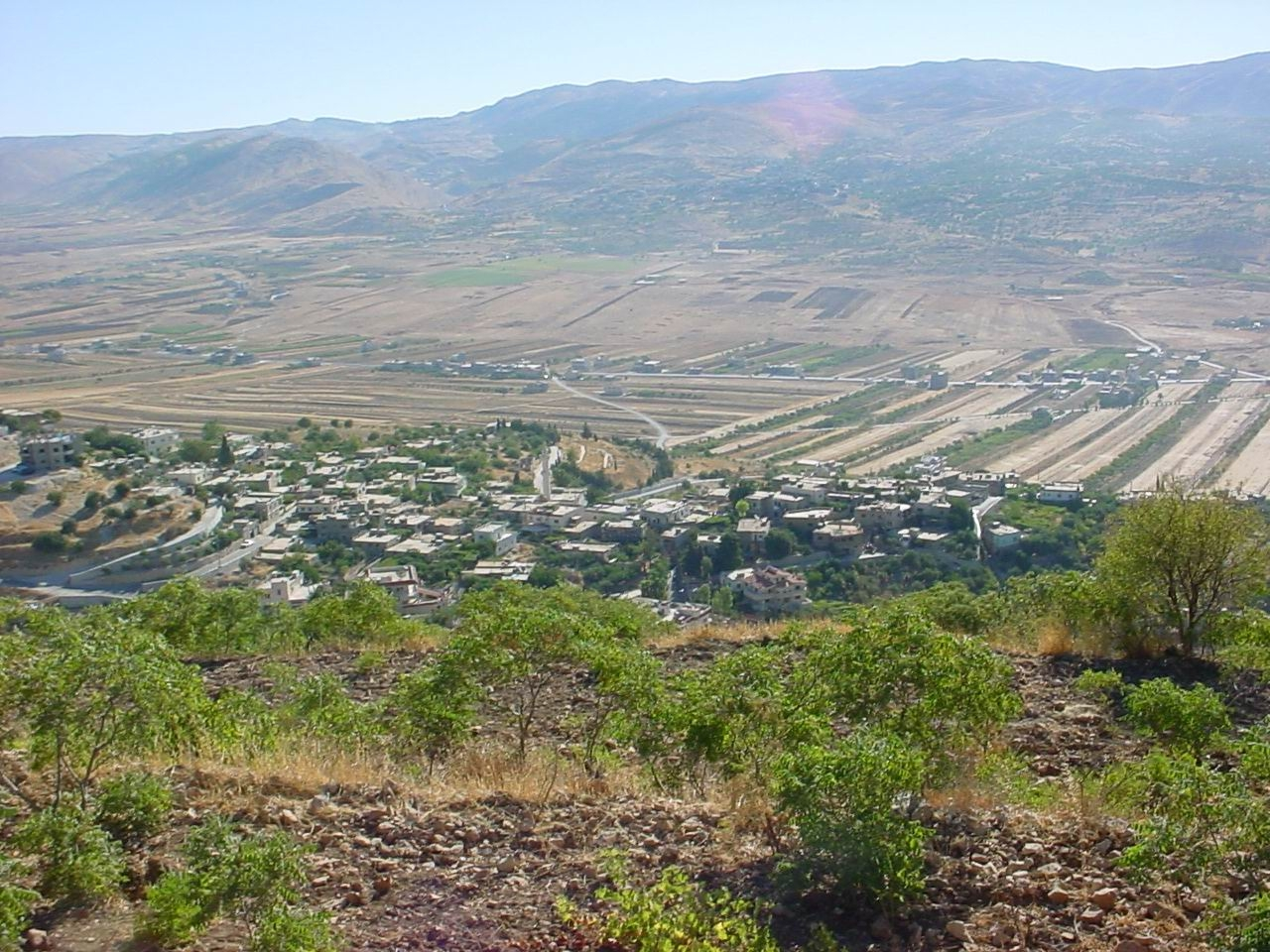
Al-Rafid, Rashaya District

Most of Rachaya's population are Druze with a Sunni and Christian minority. Many people of Rachaya have left for larger cities in Lebanon such as Beirut. During the Lebanese civil war, Rachaya was not affected as much as other parts of Lebanon during the conflict.

Rachaya is known for its pottery and famous for the Church bells made in the town, the town is right next to the Anti-Lebanon mountain range in bordering Syria.

In 1943, several prominent nationalist politicians were imprisoned in Rashaya's Castle by the French Mandate administration. Finally yielding to mounting internal and international pressure, France released the prisoners on November 22, 1943; since then, this day has been celebrated as Independence Day.

In 1969, Rashaya witnessed clashes between Palestinian fedayeen and the Lebanese army.

== Demographics ==
Year	Christians					Muslims			Druze
Year	Total	Greek Orthodox	Maronites	Greek Catholics	Other Christians	Total	Sunnis	Shias	Druze
2014	22.08%	15.56%	4.43%	1.38%	0.71%	36.21%	35.85%	0.36%	41.63%
