= Temple of Minerva =

Temple of Minerva (rarely Minervium) may refer to:

== In Rome ==
- Temple of Minerva (Aventine)
- Temple of Minerva Medica
- Temple of Minerva Medica (nymphaeum)
- Temple of Minerva Chalcidica
- Temple of Minerva (Forum of Nerva)

== Elsewhere ==
- Temple of Minerva, Assisi, Italy
- Temple of Minerva (Guatemala)
- Sanctuary of Minerva, Italy
- Portonaccio, Italy
