= Temple of Luna =

Ancient Roman temple

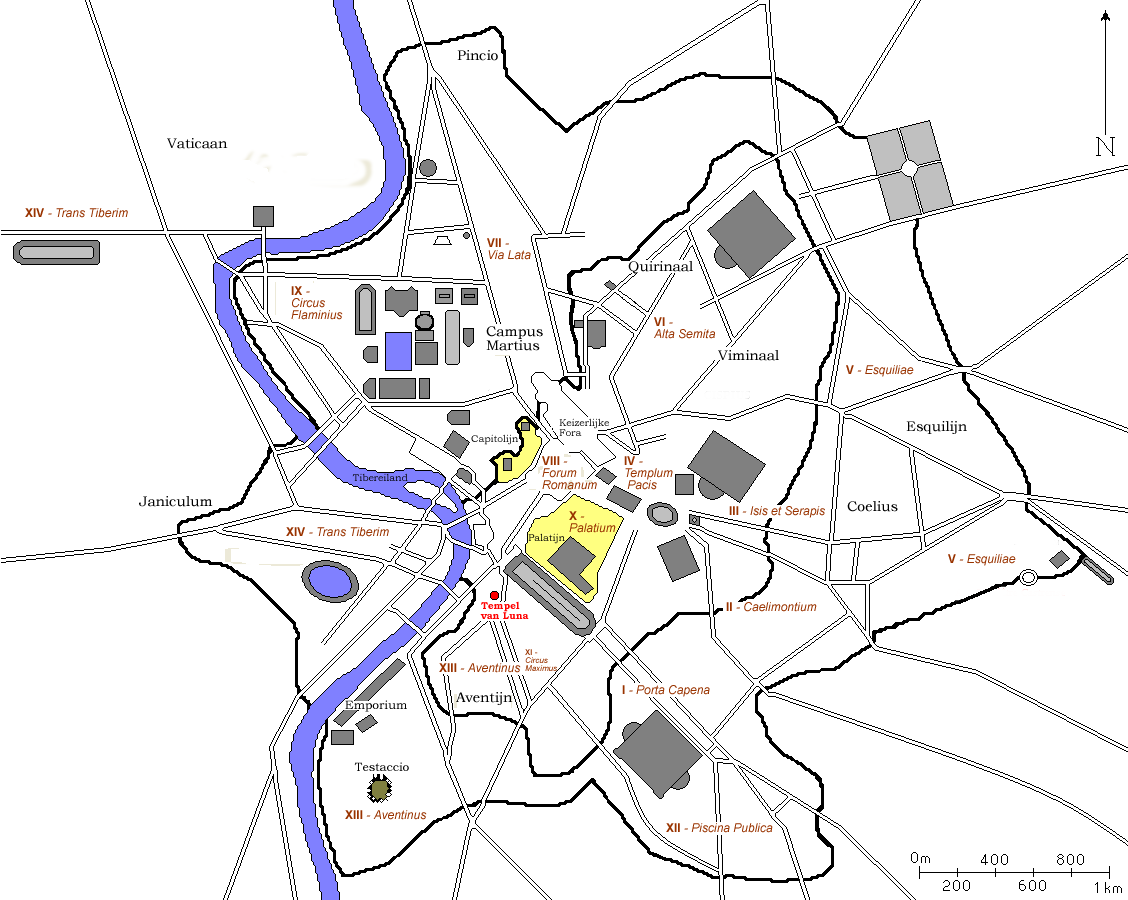
Temple of Luna (the Moon) on a map of ancient Rome around 300 AD

The Temple of Luna (Latin: templum or aedes Lunae) was a temple on the Aventine Hill in Rome, dedicated to Luna, the moon goddess. Its dedication was celebrated on 31 March.

According to Tacitus, it was built by king Servius Tullius. However, the first confirmed reference to a temple to Luna dates to 182 BC and refers to one of its doors being knocked off its posts by a miraculous blast of air and shot into the back of the Temple of Ceres. That account probably places the temple at the north end of the hill, just above porta Trigemina. The temple was struck by lightning around the time of the death of Cinna, as was the temple of Ceres. After the destruction of Corinth, Lucius Mummius Achaicus dedicated some of his spoils from the city to this temple. It was destroyed in the Great Fire of Rome in 64 AD and not rebuilt.

== See also ==
- List of Ancient Roman temples

== Sources ==
- Samuel Ball Platner, Aedes Lunae, in A Topographical Dictionary of Ancient Rome, London, Oxford University Press, 1929, p. 320
