= List of ancient Roman temples =

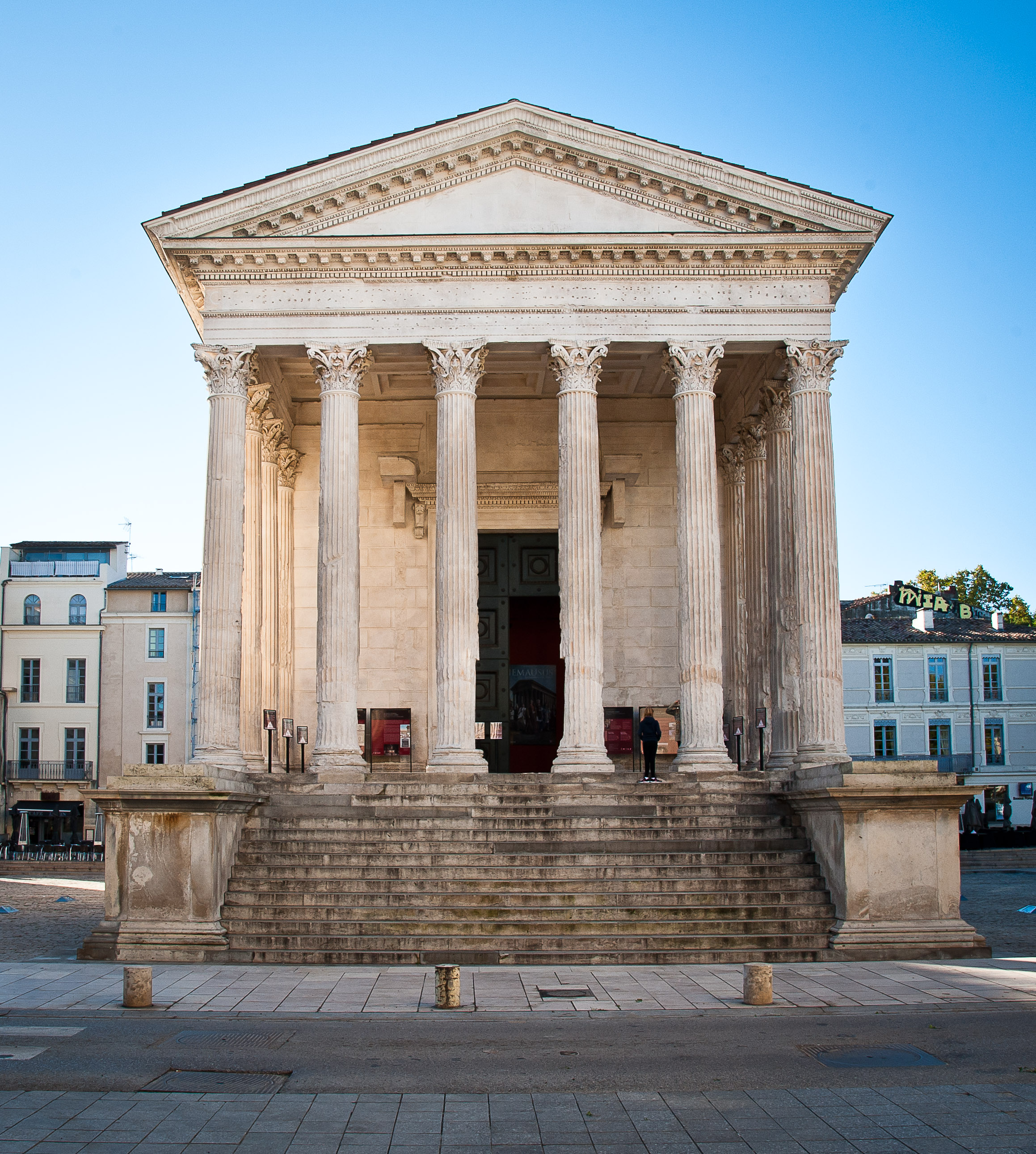
Maison carrée, Nîmes, France, one of the best preserved Roman temples

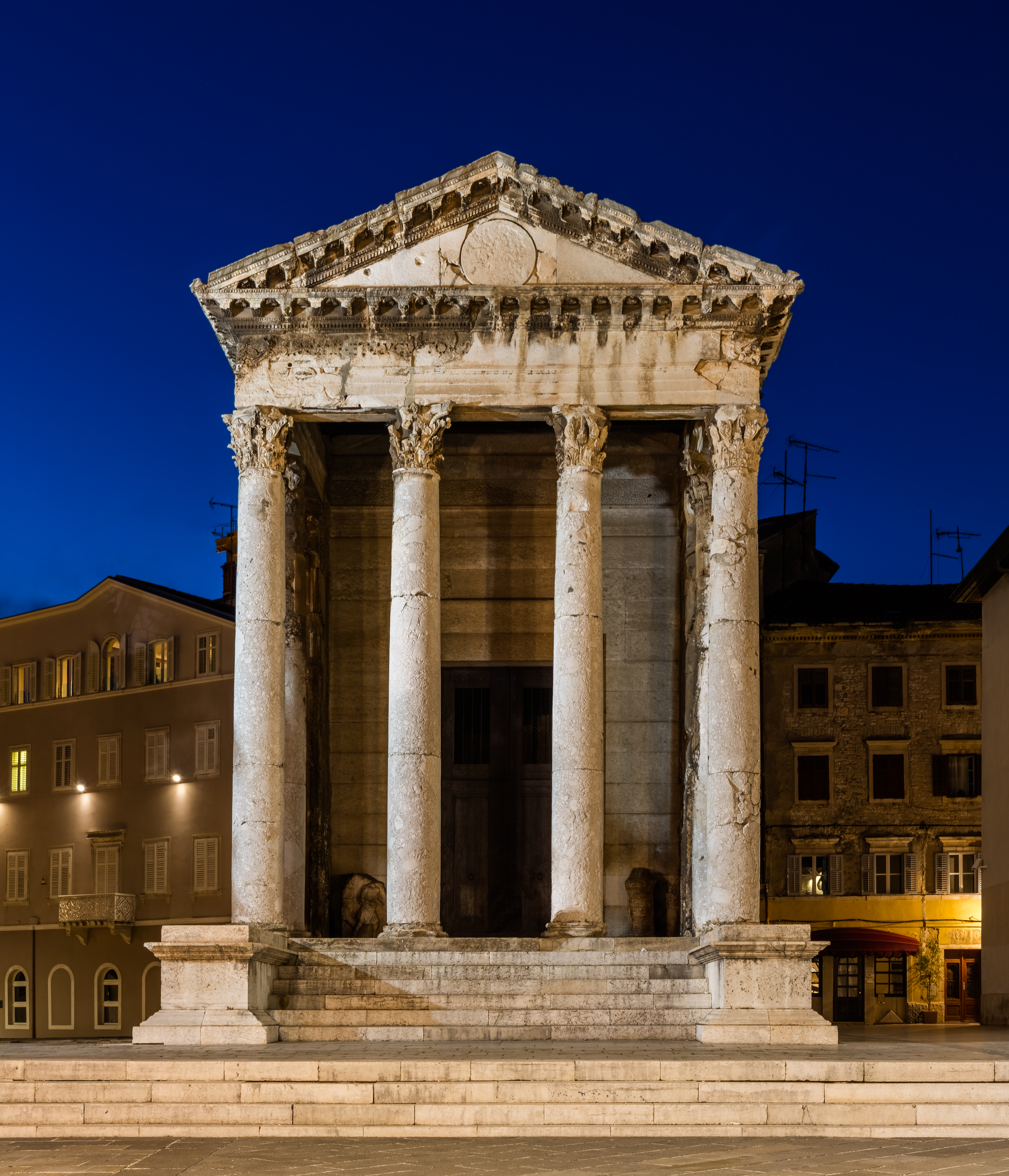
Temple of Augustus, Pula, Croatia, one of the best preserved Roman temples

This is a list of ancient Roman temples, built during antiquity by the people of ancient Rome or peoples belonging to the Roman Empire. Roman temples were dedicated to divinities from the Roman pantheon.

== Substantial remains ==
Most of the best survivals had been converted into churches and mosques. Rural areas in the Islamic world have some good remains, which had been left largely undisturbed. In Spain, some remarkable discoveries (Vic, Cordoba, Barcelona) were made in the 19th century, when old buildings being reconstructed or demolished were found to contain major remains encased in later buildings. In Rome, Pula, and elsewhere some walls incorporated in later buildings have always been evident. In most cases loose pieces of stone have been removed from the site, and some such as capitals may be found in local museums, along with non-architectural items excavated, such as terracotta votive offerings, which are often found in large numbers.

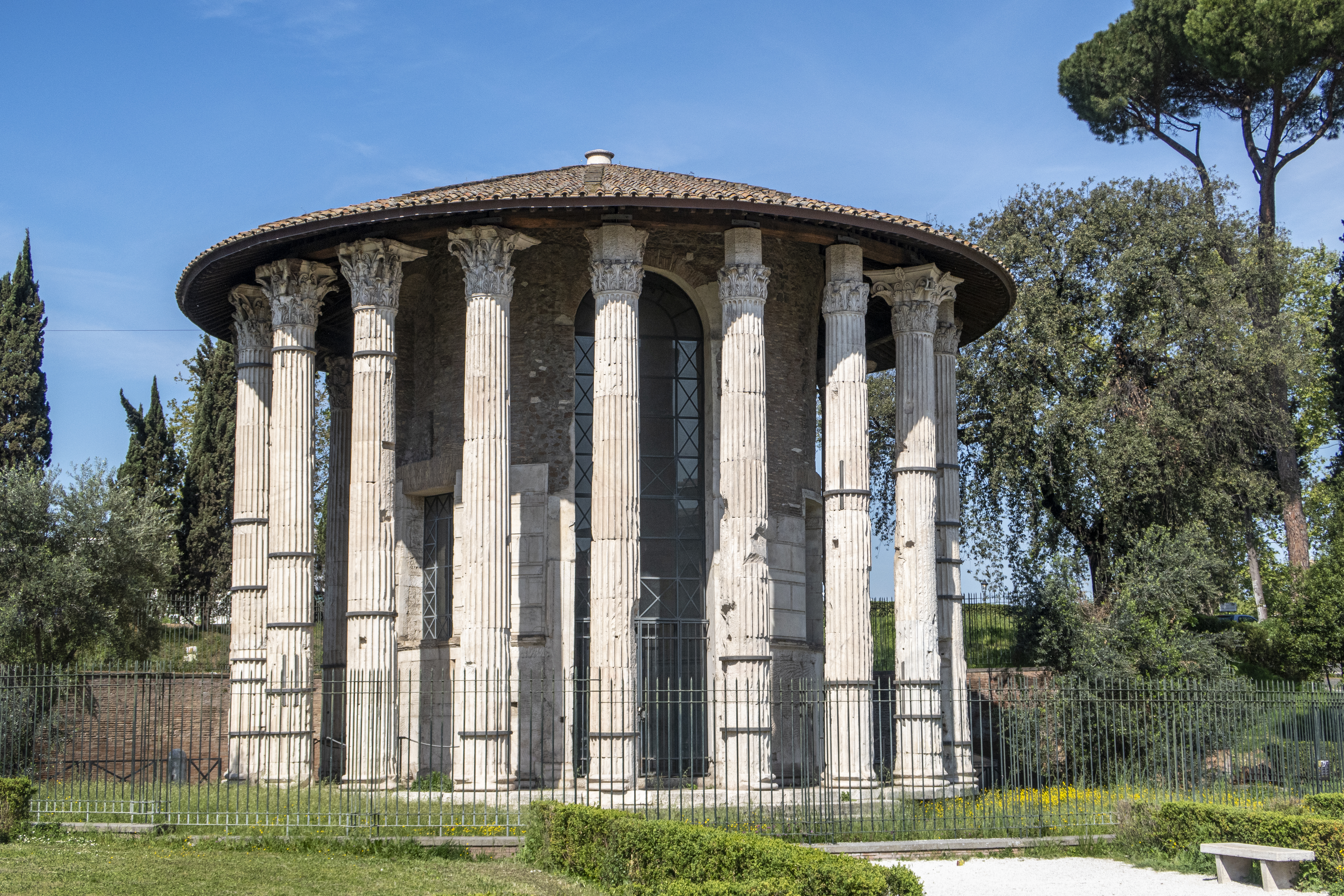
Temple of Hercules Victor

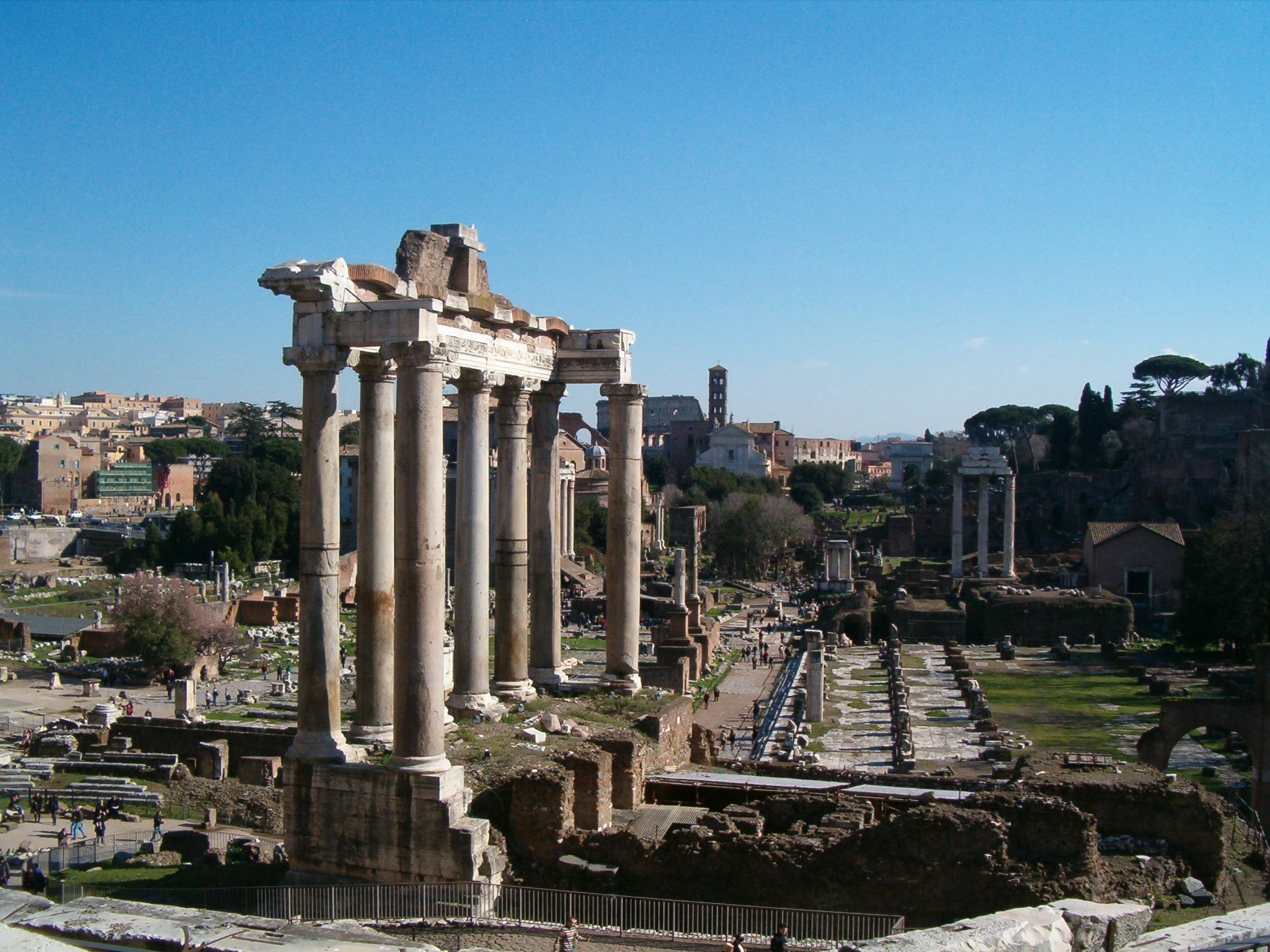
Temple of Saturn, Roman Forum, eight impressive columns and architrave remain standing

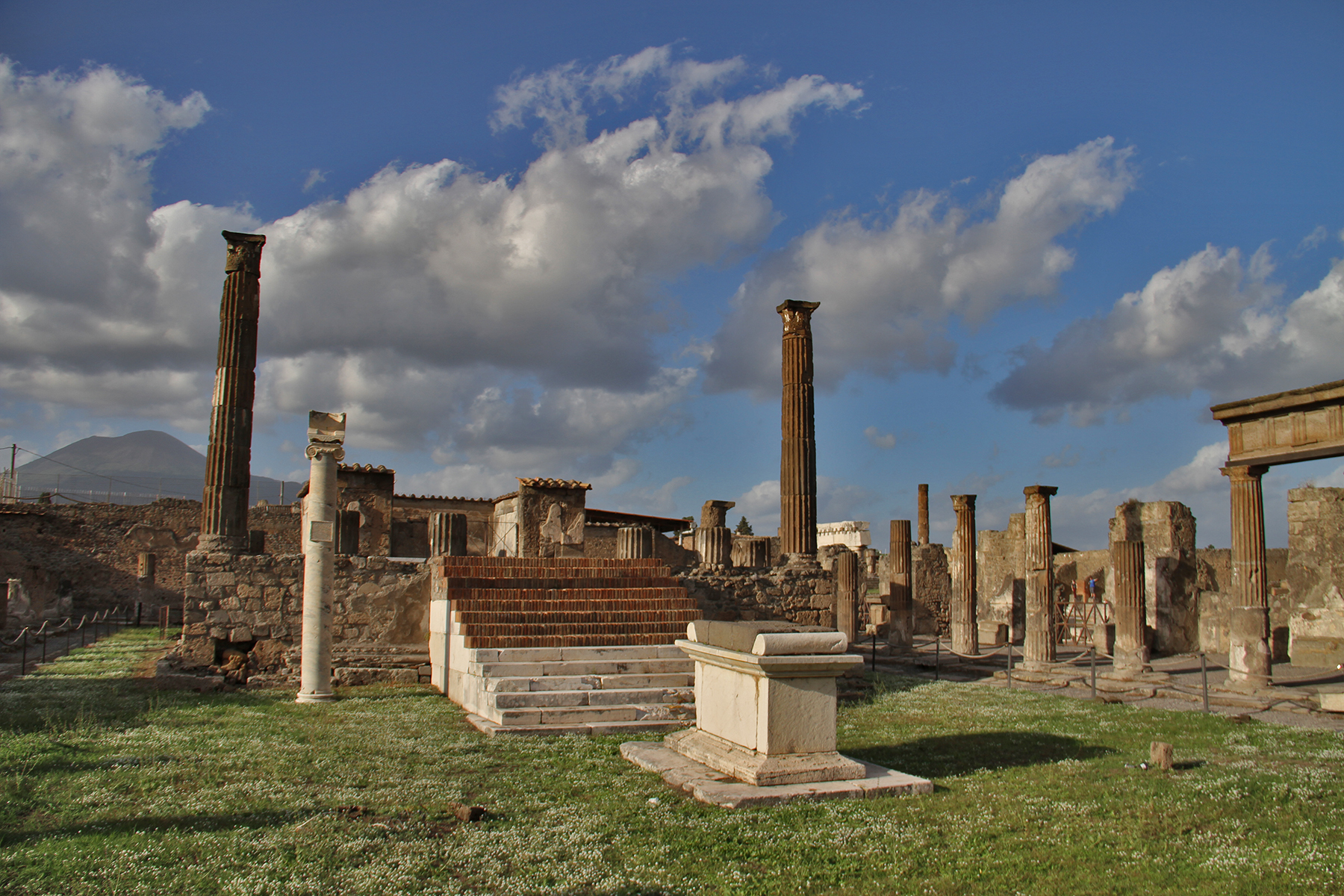
The Temple of Apollo in Pompeii. Mount Vesuvius is to the far left.

=== Rome ===
- Pantheon or Temple to All The Gods – Campus Martius
- Temple of Antoninus and Faustina, Roman Forum, the core of the building survives as a church, including parts of the frieze
- Temple of Hadrian, Campus Martius, a huge wall with eleven columns, now incorporated in a later building
- Temple of Hercules Victor, early circular temple, largely complete
- Nymphaeum often called (erroneously) the Temple of Minerva Medica
- Temple of Portunus (formerly called the Temple of Fortuna Virilis), near Santa Maria in Cosmedin and the Temple of Hercules Victor
- Temple of Romulus, Roman Forum, very complete circular exterior, early 4th century
- Temple of Saturn, eight impressive columns and architrave remain standing, west end of the Roman Forum
- Temple of Vesta, Roman Forum, small circular temple, part complete

=== Italy (outside Rome) ===
- Palestrina, Sanctuary of Fortuna Primigenia, (see above) a large complex leading to a small shrine
- Temple of Apollo (Pompeii), unusually, it is the smaller elements that are best preserved, and the surrounding forum
- Temple of Bellona, Ostia, small back-street all-brick temple at the port.
- Temple of Diana Umbronensis, a temple to Diana near Scoglietto
- Temple of Vesta, Tivoli, so-called, circular
- Capitolium of Brixia, Brescia, buried by a landslide and partly reconstructed
- Temple of Minerva, Assisi, preserved façade with six Corynthian columns, architrave and pediment.
- Temple of Augustus, Pozzuoli, pseudoperipteral temple in Parian marble, the structure of the temple re-emerged after the 1964 fire destroyed the central nave of the Baroque church that incorporated it, it's been since restored and reopened.

=== Armenia ===
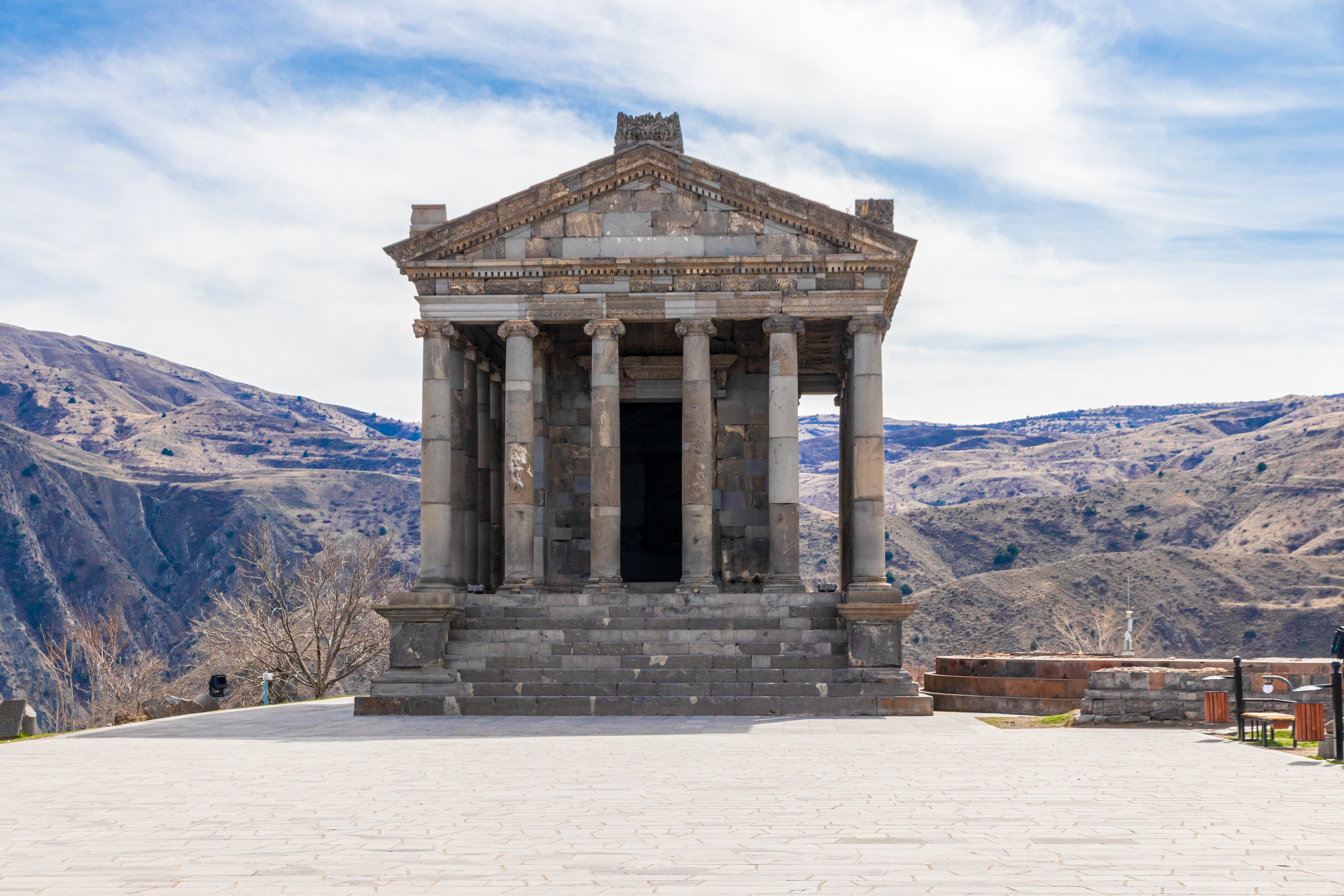
Garni Temple, Garni, Armenia, The only extant Greco-Roman temple in Armenia, the easternmost building of the Graeco-Roman world.

- Garni Temple, 1st-century, reconstructed after earthquake in 1679. The only extant Greco-Roman temple in Armenia and the former Soviet Union, described as the "easternmost building of the Graeco-Roman world".

=== Croatia ===
- Temple of Augustus, Pula, Croatia, largely complete (illustrated above); a large wall from another temple forms part of the town hall next door.
- Temple of Jupiter in Diocletian's Palace, Split, Croatia. Small but very complete, amid other Roman buildings, c. 300. Most unusually, the barrel ceiling is intact.

=== France ===
- Temple of Augustus and Livia, Vienne, France, exterior largely complete
- Roman temple of Château-Bas, a Roman ruin located in Vernègues, France
- Maison carrée, Nîmes, Southern France, one of the most complete survivals

=== Jordan ===
- Temple of Artemis, Jerash, Jordan; partial remains of two other temples

=== Lebanon ===
- Temple of Bacchus, Baalbek, Lebanon, very largely preserved, including the interior.
- Temple of Jupiter, also in Baalbek
- Roman temple of Bziza
- Sanctuary of Yanouh

=== Portugal ===
- Roman Temple of Évora, Évora, Portugal, impressive partial remains of a small temple

=== Spain ===
- Roman temple of Alcántara, near the Alcántara Bridge, Cáceres, Extremadura, Spain

=== Tunisia ===
- Sbeitla, Tunisia, three small temples in a row on the forum, many other city ruins.
- Dougga, Tunisia, several temples in extensive city ruins, two with substantial remains.

== Ruins, fragments, bases and excavations ==
=== Britain ===
- Temple of Claudius, Colchester; some of the base can be seen in the basements of Colchester Castle, which was built over it.
- Pagans Hill Roman Temple, Somerset, England, Romano-Celtic circular (octagonal) temple, the foundations excavated
- Maiden Castle, Dorset, England
- Roman Baths (Bath) and Temple of Sulis Minerva, Bath, Somerset, England
- London Mithraeum, Londinium; the reassembled foundations can be seen from the street at Temple Court, Queen Victoria Street, London EC4.

=== Italy ===
==== Rome ====
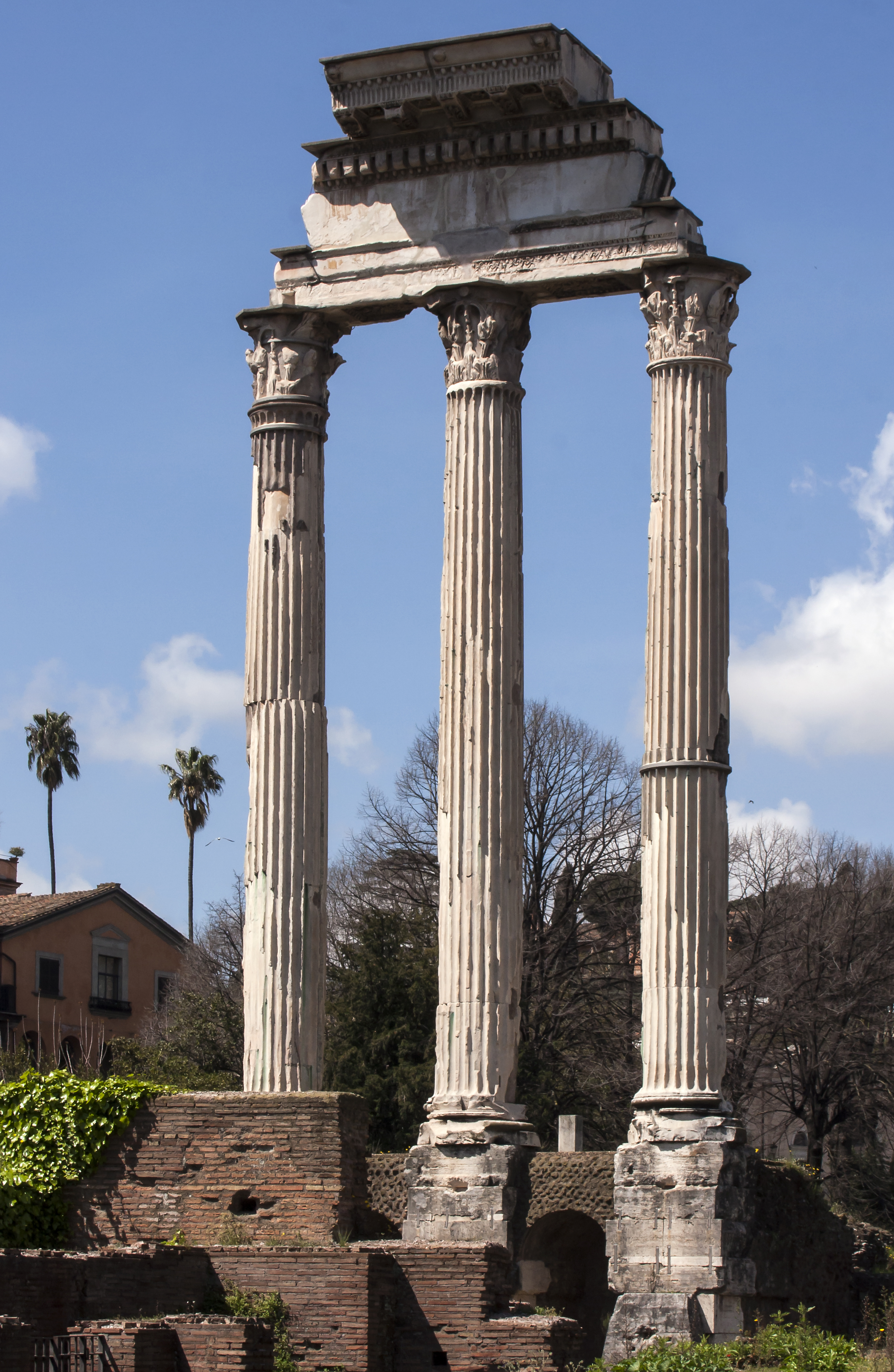
Temple of Castor and Pollux

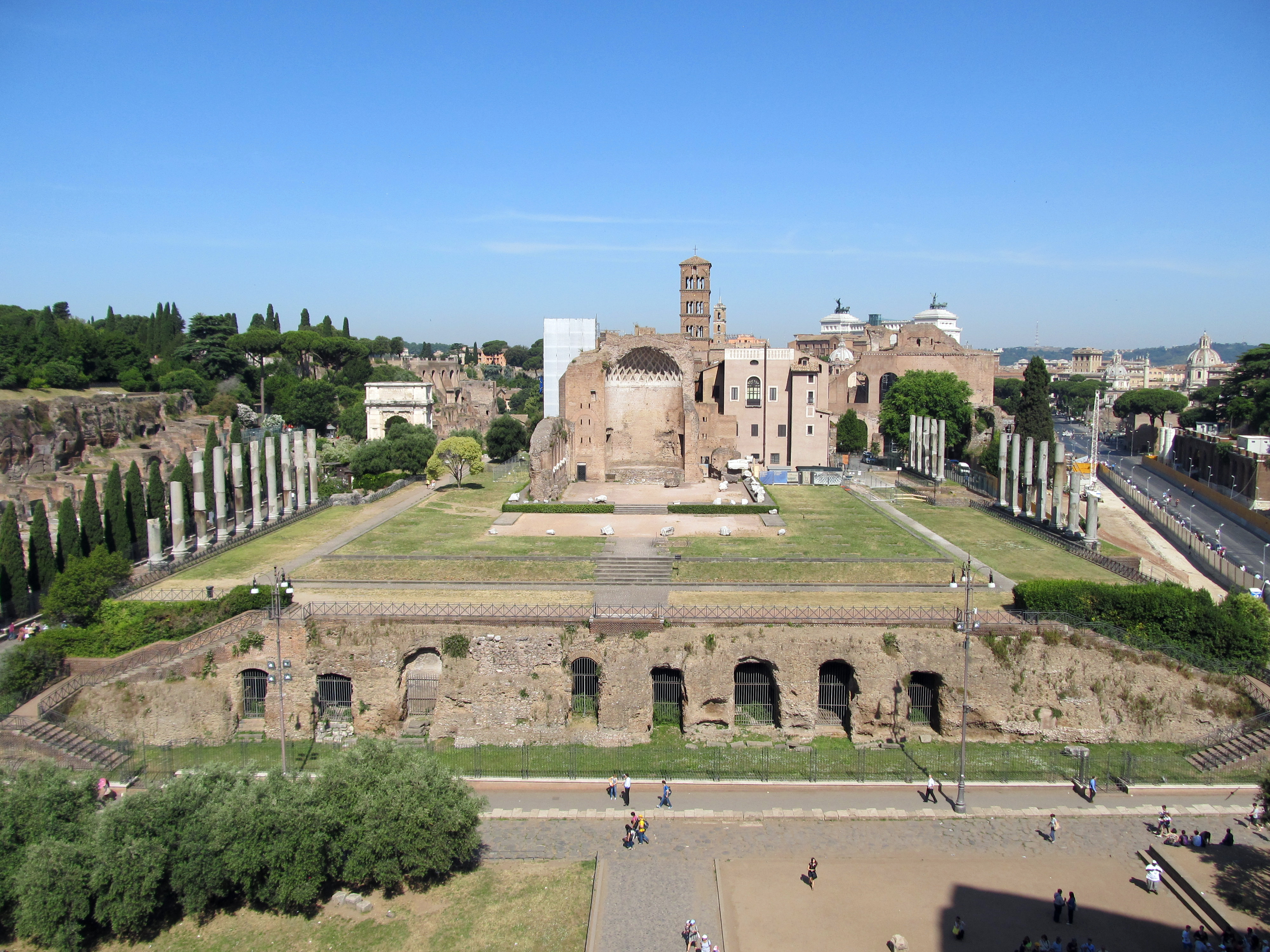
Temple of Venus and Roma

- Ponte di Nona, site of an ancient temple, of which essentially nothing survives.
- Temple of Apollo Palatinus – Palatine Hill
- Temple of Apollo Sosianus – Near the Theater of Marcellus
- Temple of Asclepius – Tiber Island
- Temple of Bellona (Rome) – Near the Theater of Marcellus
- Temple of Bona Dea – Aventine Hill
- Largo di Torre Argentina – remains of four small temples of the Republic can be seen
- Temple of Caesar – Roman Forum
- Temple of Ceres, Liber and Libera – Aventine Hill
- Temple of Castor and Pollux – three columns with entablature still stand in the Roman Forum
- Temple of Claudius – Aventine Hill
- Temple of Concord – Roman Forum at the base of the Capitoline
- Temple of Cybele (Magna Mater) – Palatine Hill
- Temple of Diana – Aventine Hill
- Temple of Divus Augustus behind Basilica Julia
- Temple of Elgabal – Palatine Hill
- Temple of Flora – Aventine Hill
- Temple of Fortuna Equestris – Campus Martius
- Temple of Fortuna Respiciens – Palatine Hill
- Temple of the gens Flavia – Quirinal Hill
- Temple of Hercules Custos – Campus Martius
- Temple of Hercules Musarum – Campus Martius
- Temple of Isis and Serapis – Campus Martius
- Temple of Janus (Roman Forum)
- Temple of Janus (Forum Holitorium)
- Temple of Juno Moneta – Capitoline Hill
- Temple of Juno Regina – Campus Martius
- Temple of Juno Regina (Aventine) – Aventine Hill
- Temple of Juno Sospita (Palatine) – Palatine Hill
- Temple of Jupiter (Capitoline Hill) – Capitoline Hill (under Palazzo Conservatori)
- Temple of Jupiter Invictus – Palatine Hill
- Temple of Jupiter Stator (3rd century BC) – in front of the gate of the Palatine Hill
- Temple of Jupiter Stator (2nd century BC) – in the southern Campus Martius
- Temple of Jupiter Tonans – Palatine Hill
- Temple of Luna – Aventine Hill
- Temple of Marcus Aurelius – Campus Martius
- Temple of Mars – Campus Martius
- Temple of Mars Ultor – Forum of Augustus
- Temple of Matidia – Campus Martius
- Temple of Mercury – Aventine Hill
- Temple of Minerva Chalcidica – Campus Martius
- Temple of Minerva Medica, named in literary sources but no longer extant
- Temple of Minerva (Aventine) – Aventine Hill
- Temple of Minerva (Forum of Nerva) – Forum of Nerva
- Temple of Neptune – in the southern Campus Martius
- Temple of the Nymphs – Campus Martius
- Temple of Peace – Forum of Peace (now mostly covered by Via dei Fori Imperiali)
- Temple of Serapis – Quirinal Hill
- Temple of Siriaco – Janiculum Hill
- Temple of the Sun – Campus Martius
- Temple of Trajan – Trajan's Forum
- Temple of Venus and Roma – podium and part of the cellae still stand at the northeast corner of the Roman Forum, some other fragments incorporated in Santa Francesca Romana
- Temple of Venus Genetrix – three columns with entablature still stand in the Forum of Caesar
- Temple of Vespasian and Titus, three columns with entablature still stand in the Roman Forum, with other fragments elsewhere
- Temple of Veiovis – Capitoline Hill (Basement of Palazzo Senatorio)
- Temple of Vesta – small circular temple, part complete
- Temple of Vulcan – Campus Martius

=== France ===
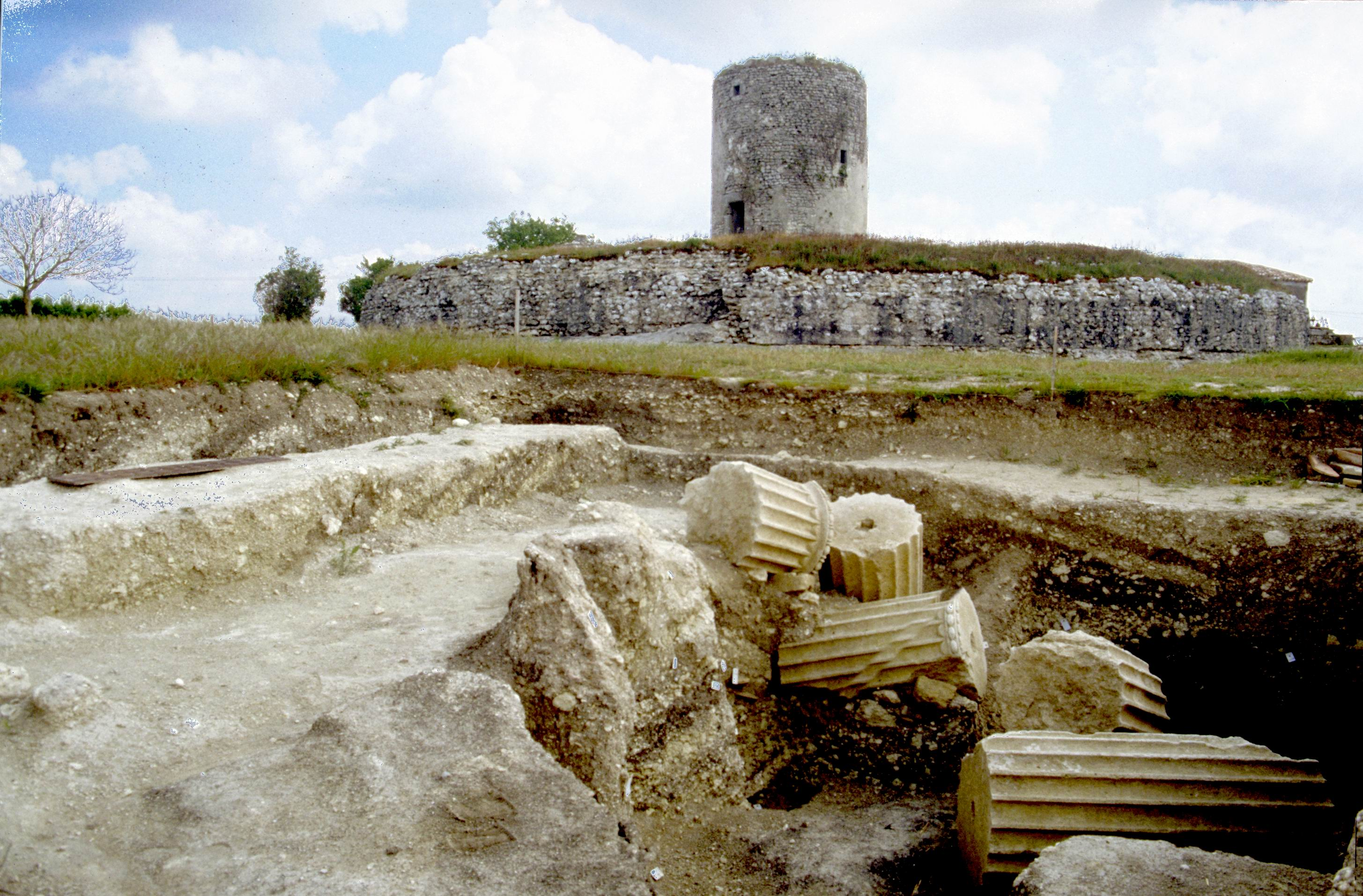
Temple of the Moulin du Fâ, a gallo-roman tholos-style fanum, in western France.

- Temple of the Moulin du Fâ, a giant circular/tholos fanum.
- Tower of Vesunna, another giant circular/tholos fanum.
- Temple of Mars (Corseul), had a giant tower like cella.
- Valetudo temple, a small rustic Corinthian temple.
- Temple of Diana (Nîmes), part of its cella preserved, and holding up part of the barrel celling.
- The Twin Temples, at Glanum. One big and one smaller Corinthian temple.
- Temple of Sanxay, at the Gallo-Roman site of Sanxay, featuring an octagonal cella.
- Remains of the Temple of Emperor Augustus, Arles, two columns stand holding up the corner of the temple roof.
- Gallo-Roman Sanctuary of Pièces-Grandes, a complex of gallo-roman fanums.
- Fanum d'Aron, another circular/tholos fanum.

=== Germany ===
- Temple of the Capitoline Triad, the basements incorporated in St. Maria im Kapitol, Cologne, North Rhine-Westphalia.
- Hafentempel in the Xanten Archeology Park in Xanten, North Rhine-Westphalia. A small peripteral Corinthian temple, partly reconstructed.
- Matronentempel, also in the Xanten Archaeology Park. A small Gallo-Roman temple, the basements can be seen.
- Temple district Altbachtal, Altbach, Baden-Württemberg
- Temple at the Herrenbrünnchen, Trier, Rhineland-Palatinate
- Temple of Aesclepius, Trier
- Temple of Lenus Mars, Trier
- A foundation of Roman temple was found at Königsplatz of Speyer, Rheinland-Palatinate

=== Lebanon ===
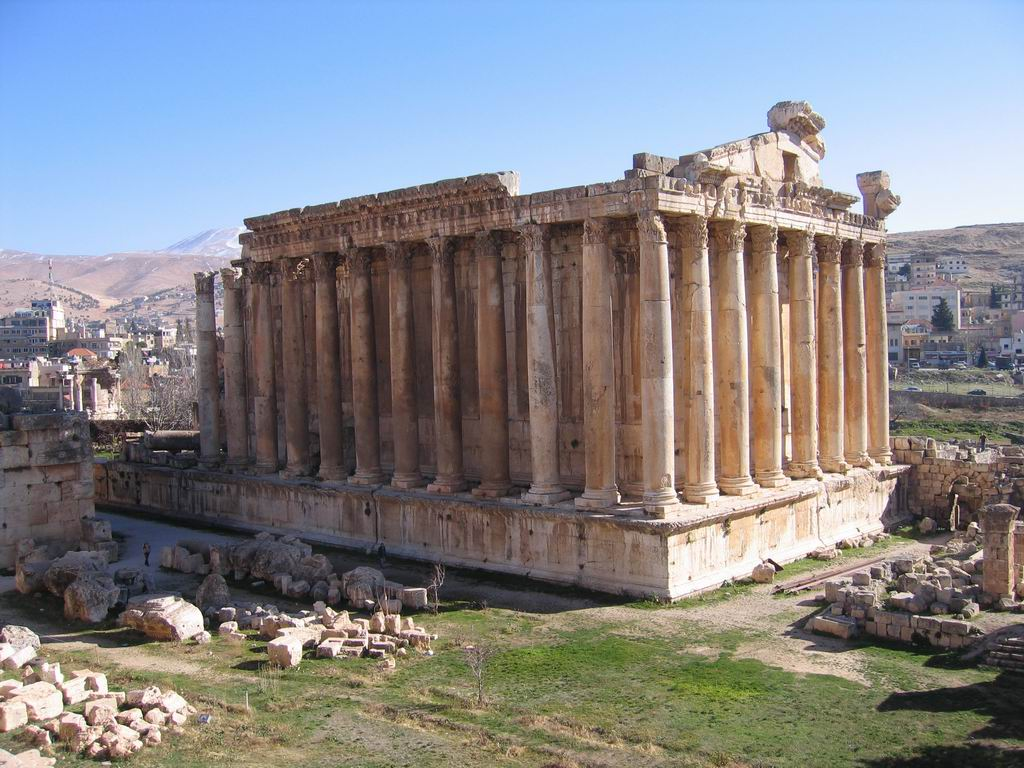
Temple of Bacchus, Baalbek, Lebanon

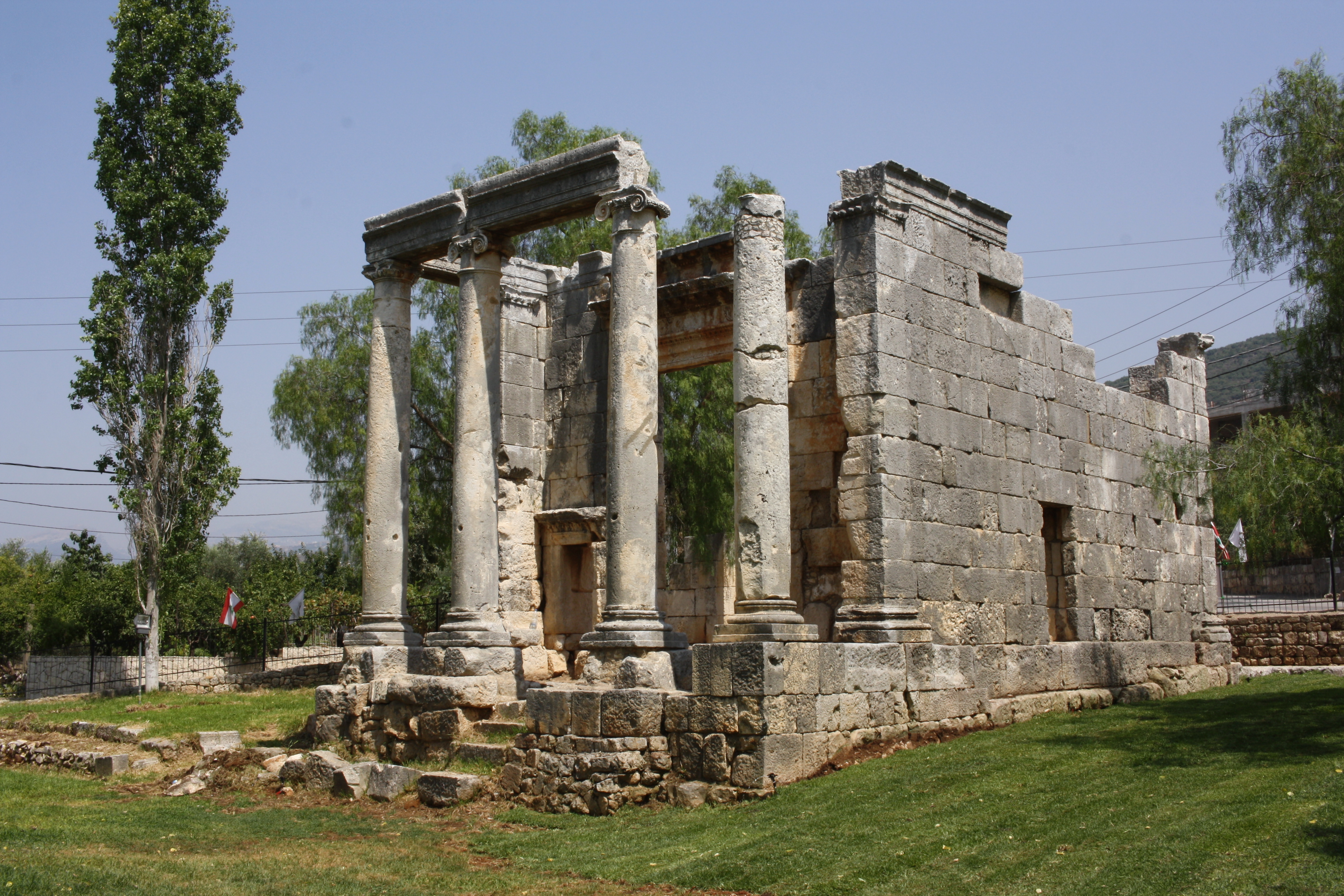
Roman temple of Bziza

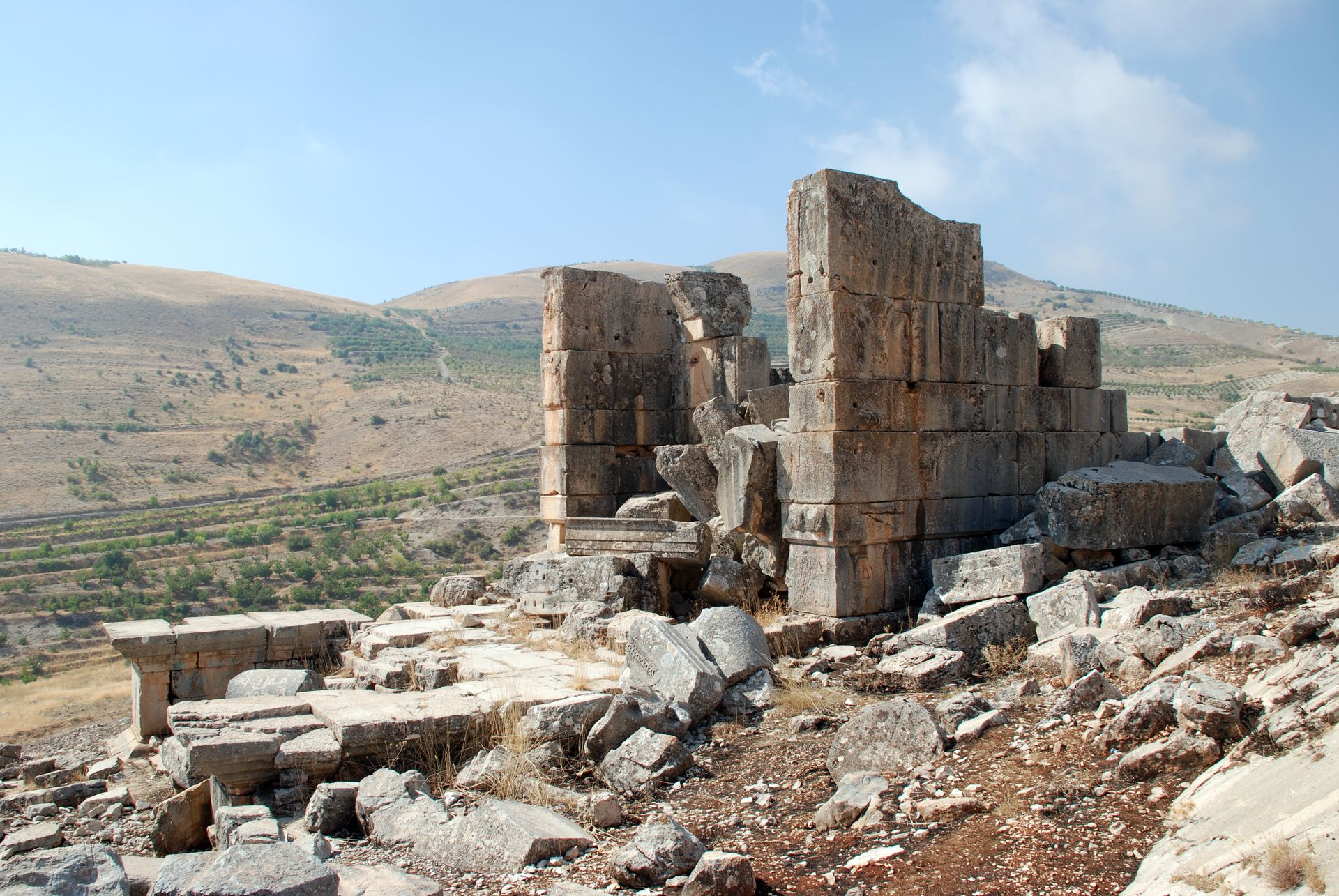
Roman temple of Hosn Niha

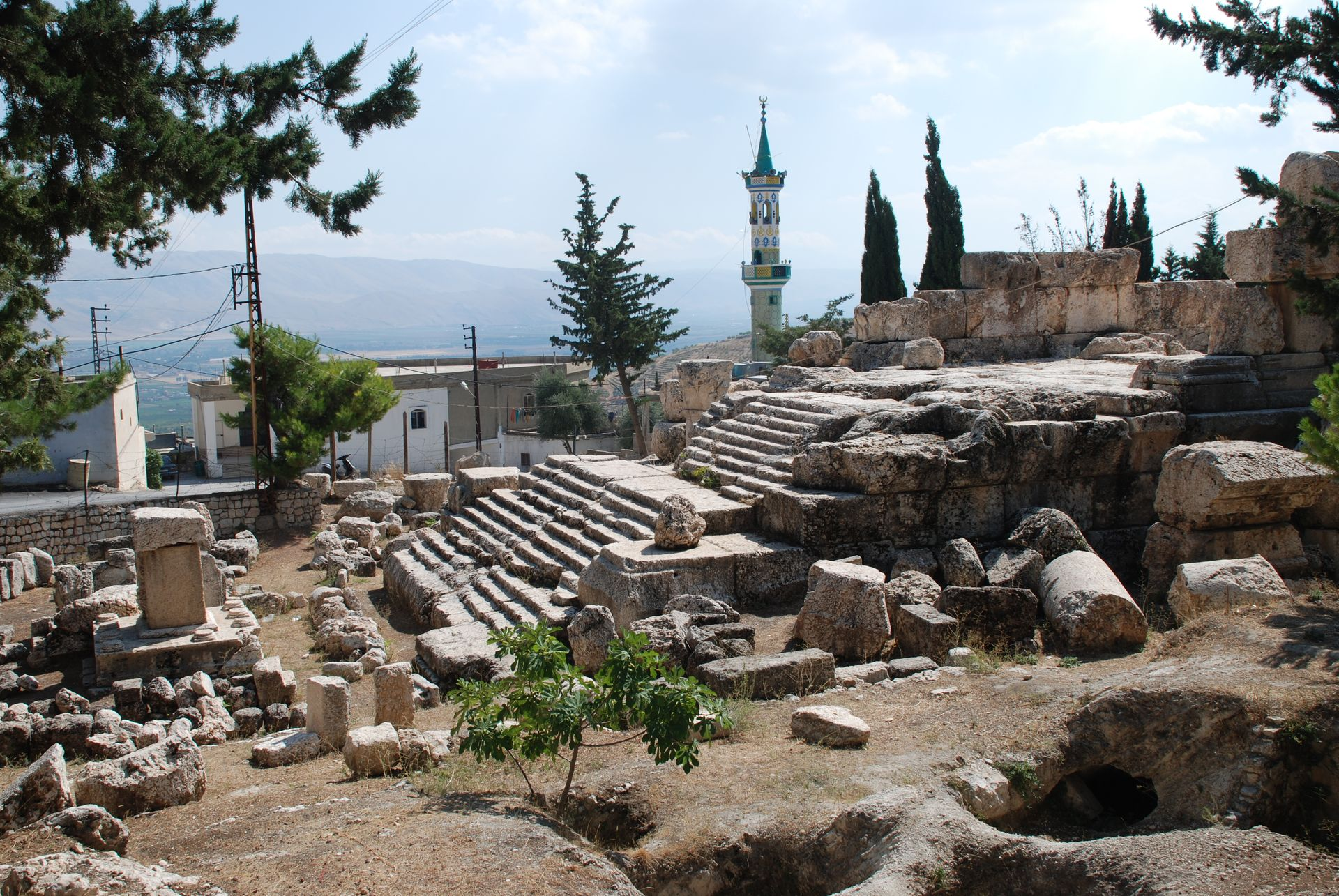
Roman temple of Qasr el Banat

- The 30 or so Temples of Mount Hermon are a group of small temples and shrines, some with substantial remains. Some are in modern Syria and Israel.
- Temples of the Beqaa Valley, including Baalbek (see above).
- Aaiha
- Aaqbe
- Afka
- Ain Aata
- Ain Harcha, good remains on a ridge-top outside town
- Antoura
- Bakka, Lebanon
- Roman temple of Bziza
- Dakoue
- Deir El Aachayer
- Edde
- Hebbariye
- Hosn Niha
- Kafr Zebad
- Kalaa
- Kfar Qouq
- Khirbet El-Knese
- Labweh
- Libbaya
- Makam Er-Rab
- Mejdal Anjar
- Nebi Safa
- Niha Bekaa, 4 small temples to local gods with partial remains, 1st century AD on.
- Qal'at Bustra
- Qasr el Banat
- Saraain El Faouqa
- Shheem
- Yaat
- Yanta
- Sfire

=== Malta ===
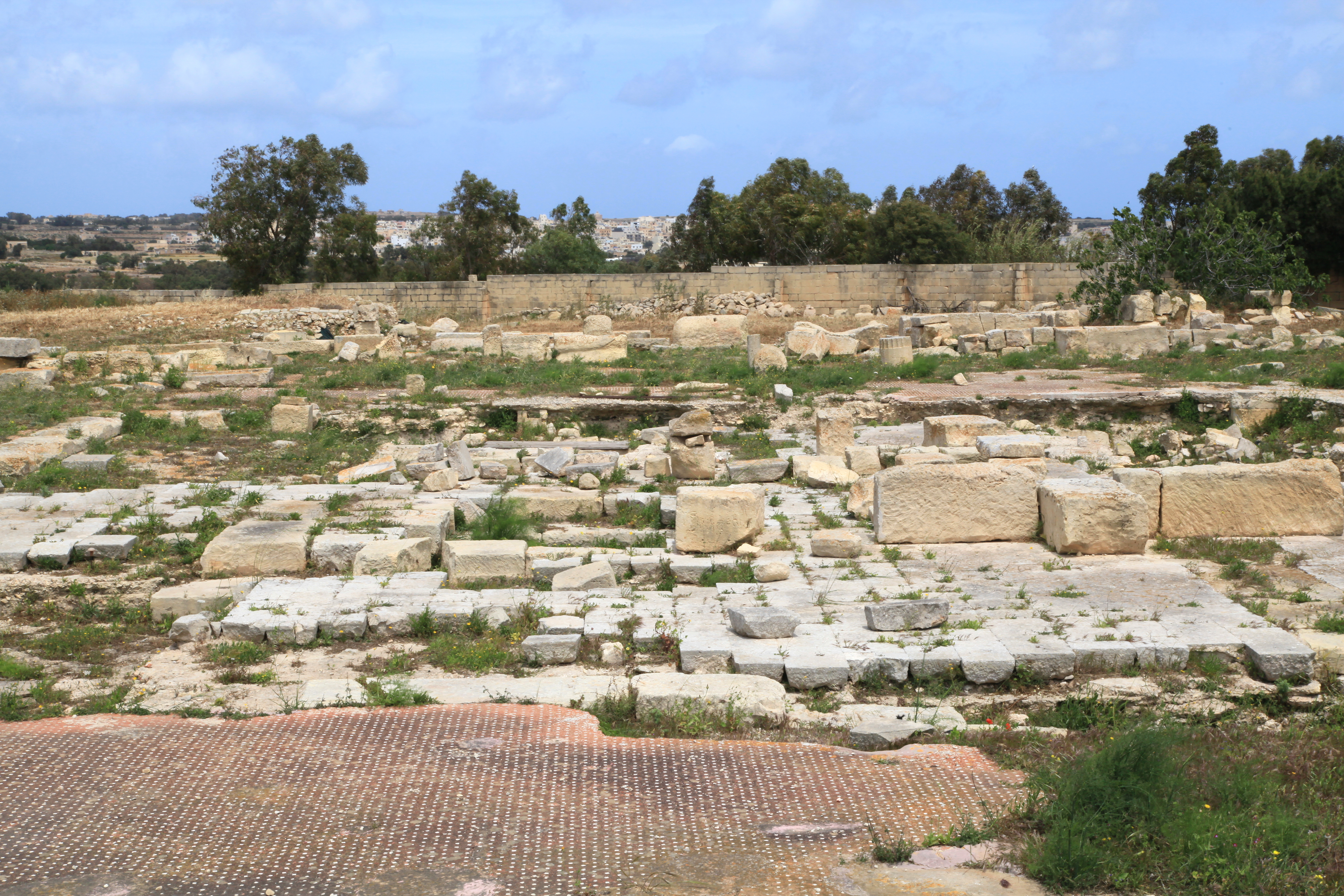
Ruins of Tas-Silġ, a multi-period sanctuary site containing the remains of a Temple of Juno

- Temple of Apollo in Melite (modern Mdina) – some ruins dismantled in the 18th century and stones reused in other buildings; part of podium still exists
- Temple of Juno in Gaulos (modern Victoria, Gozo) – ruins dismantled in 1697–1711 during the construction of the Cathedral of the Assumption; some remains survive beneath the cathedral
- Temple of Juno at Tas-Silġ, near Marsaxlokk – some foundations survive
- Temple of Proserpina in Mtarfa – ruins dismantled in the 17th-18th centuries and stones reused in other buildings; an inscription, a fragment of a marble column and parts of a Punic cornice survive

=== Romania ===
Not much remains to be seen, but there were temples at Ulpia Traiana Sarmizegetusa (6), Alburnus Major (2), Apulum, Tibiscum Porolissum and probably Potaissa (suggested by five neighboring altars), as well as other sites.

=== Scotland ===
- Arthur's O'on, Stenhousemuir, Scotland. Unusual stone "beehive"-shaped building, probably a temple, destroyed in 1743.

=== Slovenia ===
- Temple of Hercules – Celje, Slovenia.
- Gallo-Roman Temple – Celje, Slovenia - remains of Gallo-Roman Temple.

=== Spain ===
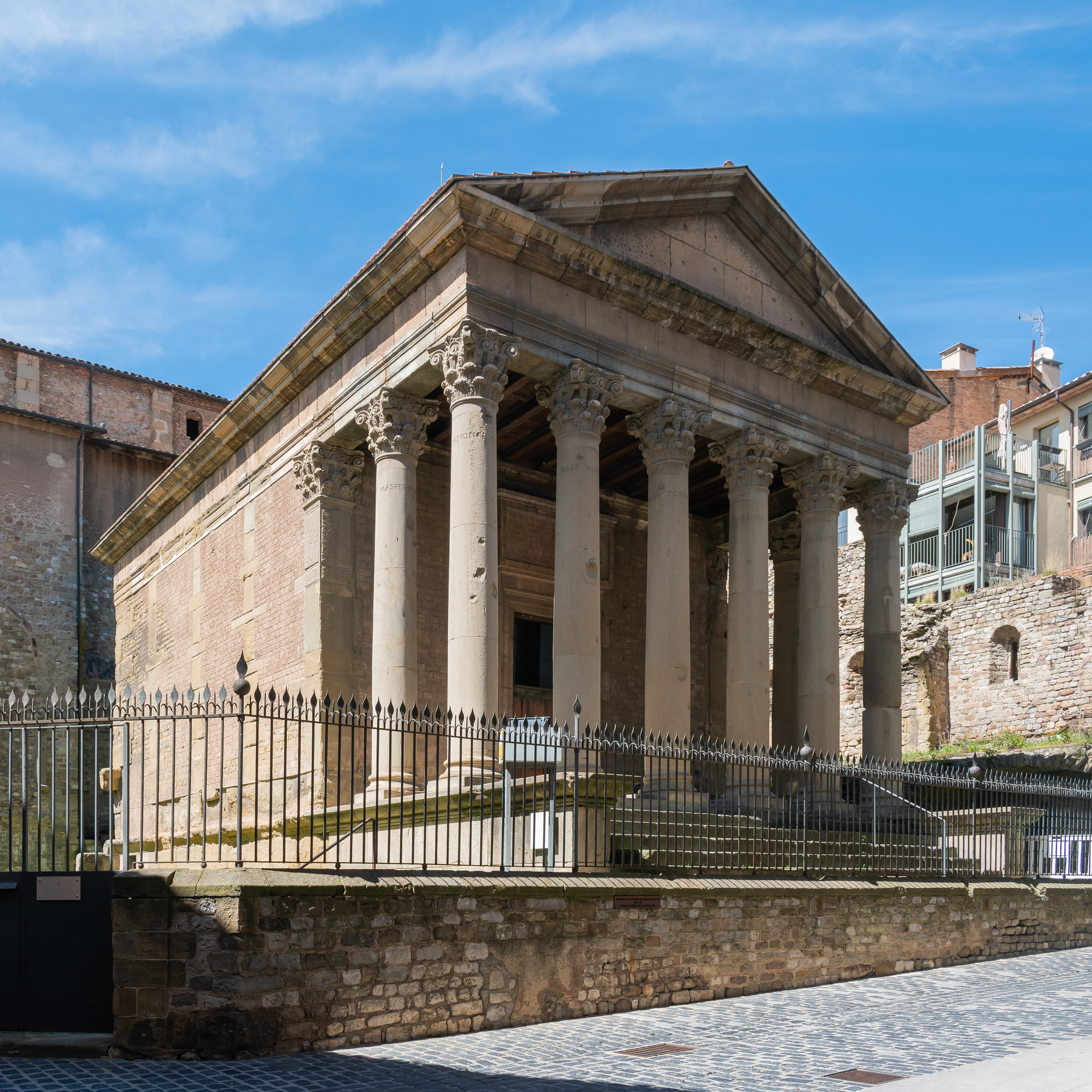
Roman temple of Vic, part original, with parts restored

- Roman temple of Córdoba, Spain. Base and 11 Corinthian columns, found inside later buildings.
- Roman temple of Vic, Spain. Substantially rebuilt, after it was found covered by a castle.
- Temple of Augustus in Barcelona, Spain. Four large columns on base, found within a later building.
- Temple of Diana, Mérida, Mérida, Spain.

=== Syria ===
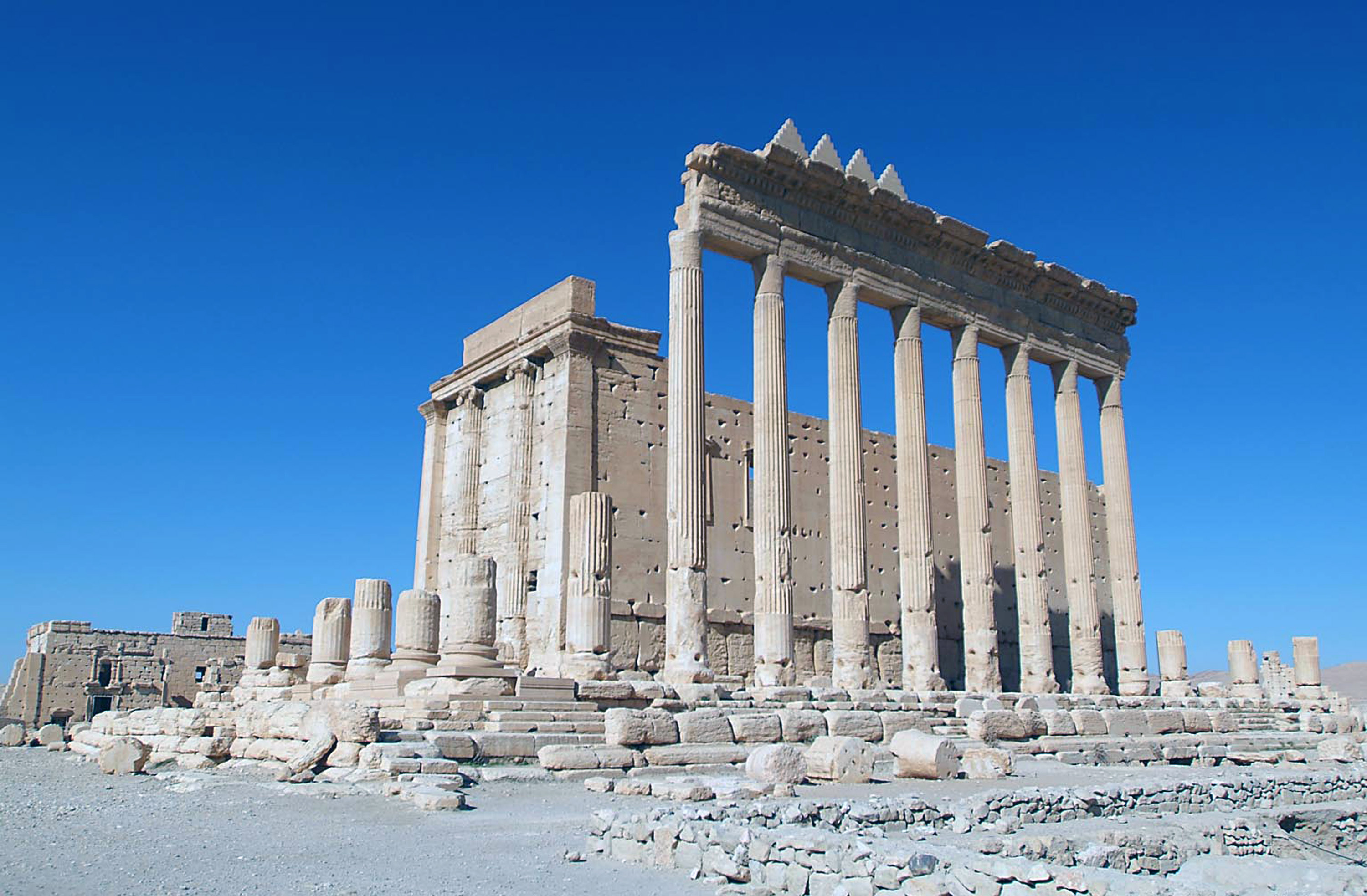
Temple of Bel, Palmyra

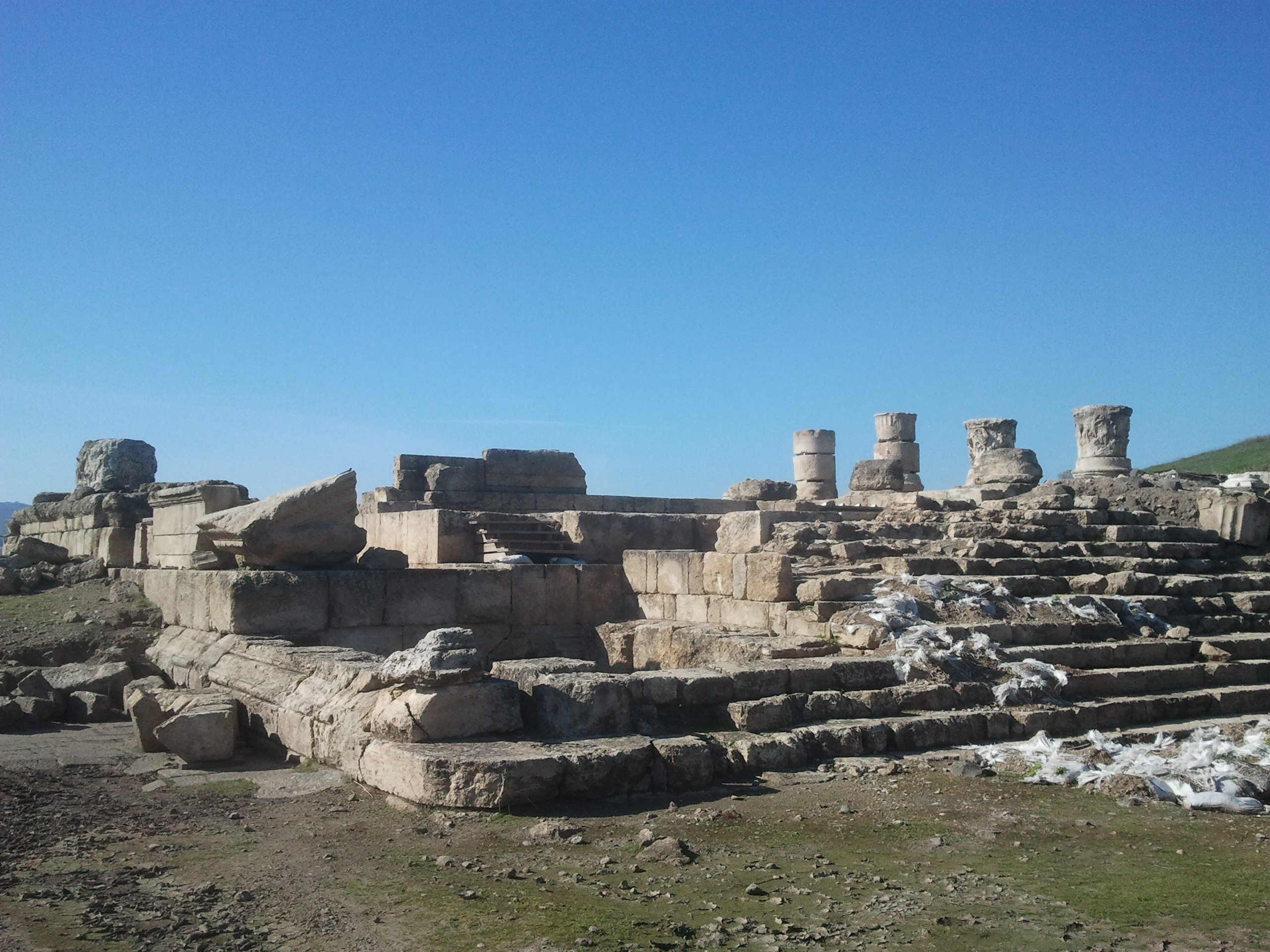
Horvat Omrit Temple

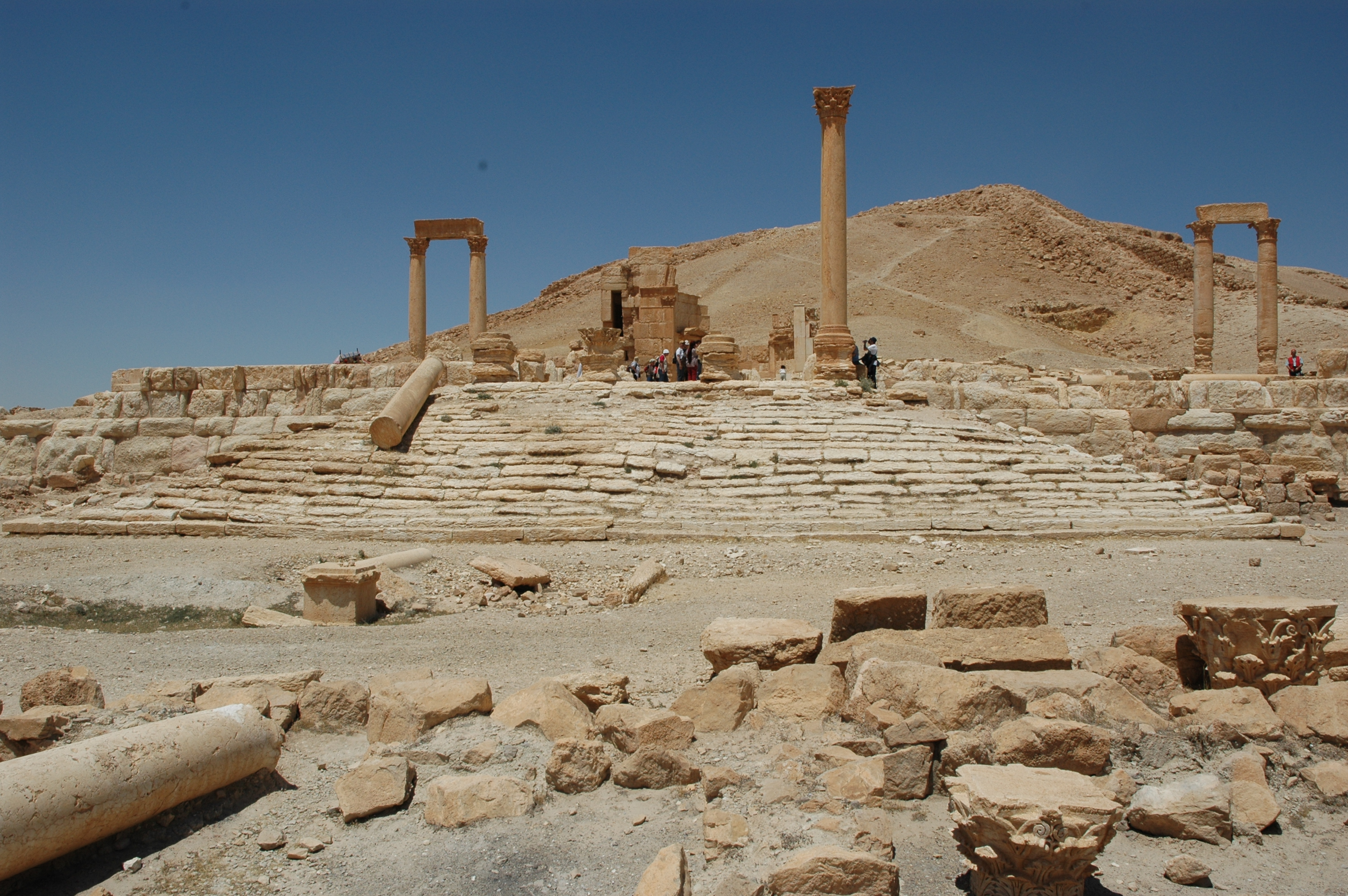
Temple of Al-Lat

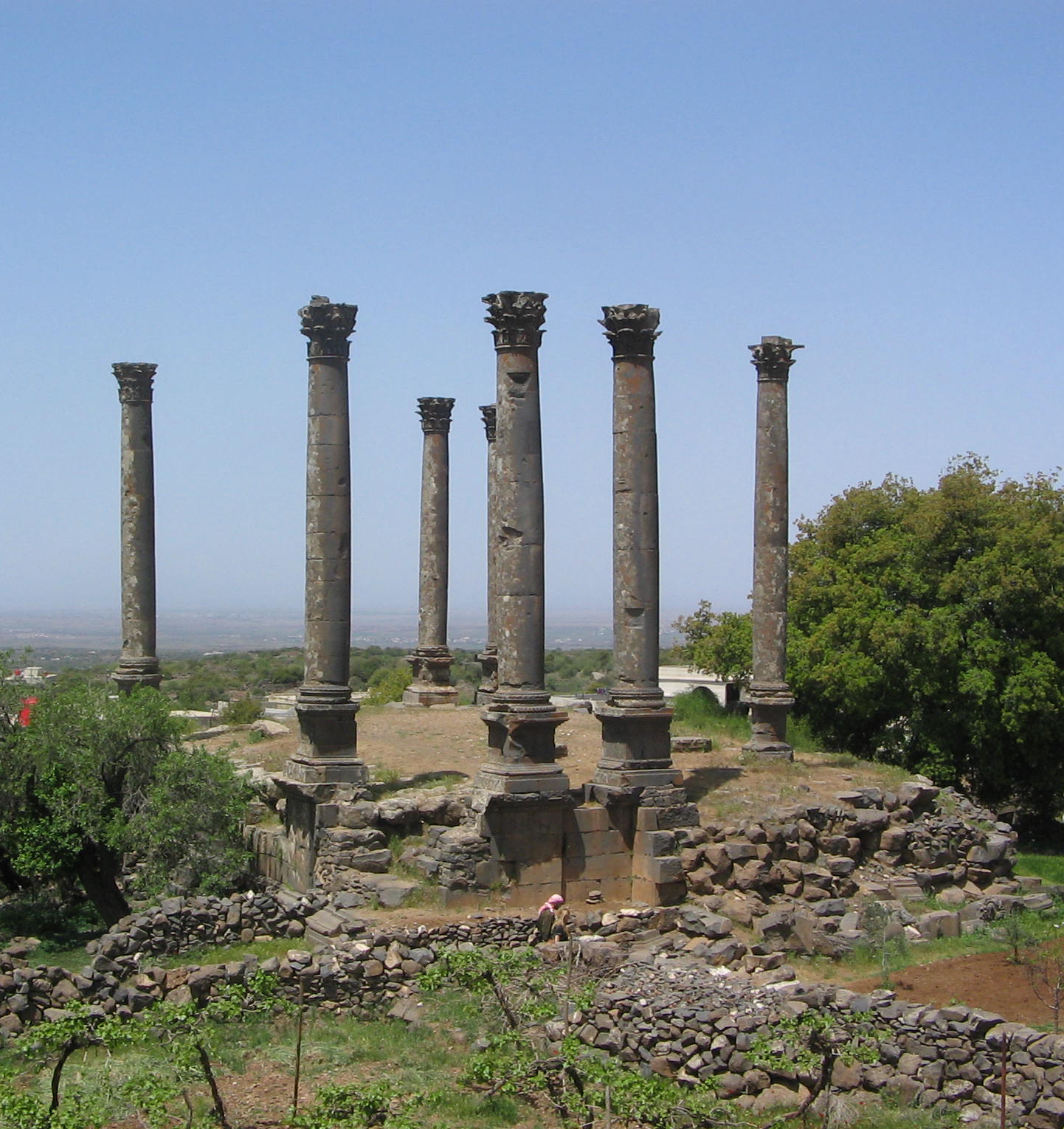
Temple of Rabbos

- Rakhleh, and other Temples of Mount Hermon
- Burqush
- Temple of Bel, Palmyra
- Temple of Jupiter, Damascus, Syria
- Temple of Zeus Hypsistos, Al-Dumayr
- Funerary Temple, Palmyra
- Temple of Bel-Shamin, Palmyra
- Roman temple at Al-Mushannaf
- Latakia Tetraporticus
- Temple of Zeus Theos, Dura-Europos
- Temple of Atargatis, Dura-Europos
- Temple of the Gadde, Dura-Europos
- Temple of Adonis, Dura-Europos
- Temple of Artemis Azzanathkona, Dura -Europos
- Temple of Zeus Kyrios, Dura-Europos
- Temple of Zeus Megistos, Dura-Europos
- Temple of Artemis Nanaia, Dura-Europos
- Hosn Suleiman Temple
- Bakhos Temple Latakia
- Masmiyah-Phaena Temple
- Temple of Bel, Dura-Europos
- Temple of Augustus, Caesarea Philippi
- Temple of Zeus, Caesarea Philippi
- Upper Tomb Temple, Caesarea Philippi
- Lower Tomb Temple, Caesarea Philippi
- Horvat Omrit Temple (Augustus Temple)
- Court of Pan, Caesarea Philippi
- Atil, Roman temples
- Sia Roman Temple, southern Syria
- Athriya Roman Temple
- Temple of Zeus Bomos, Baqirha
- The remains of the 2nd-century Roman temple of Tyche in al-Sanamayn
- Temple of Allat, Palmyra
- Temple of Nabu, Palmyra
- Temple of Baal-hamon, Palmyra
- Roman Temple Kalybe (Bosra al-Sham)
- Temple of the Tyche, Apamea
- Roman Syria Temples (Modern Lebanon)- (Modern Israel/Golan Heights)
- The 30 or so Temples of Mount Hermon are a group of small temples and shrines, some with substantial remains. Some are in modern Lebanon and Israel.
- Roman Temple at Harran al-Awamid
- Roman Temple in Qasr Chbib
- Temple dedicated to sun god (Helios), As-Suwayda Qanawat (Kanawat)
- Temple of Bacchus in present-day Latakia
- Korsei el-Debb Roman temple
- Temple of Rabbos, Al Quanawat
- Temple to the sun god El Gabal, with the holy stone.
- Temple of Zeus and Temple Cyrrhus

=== Tunisia ===
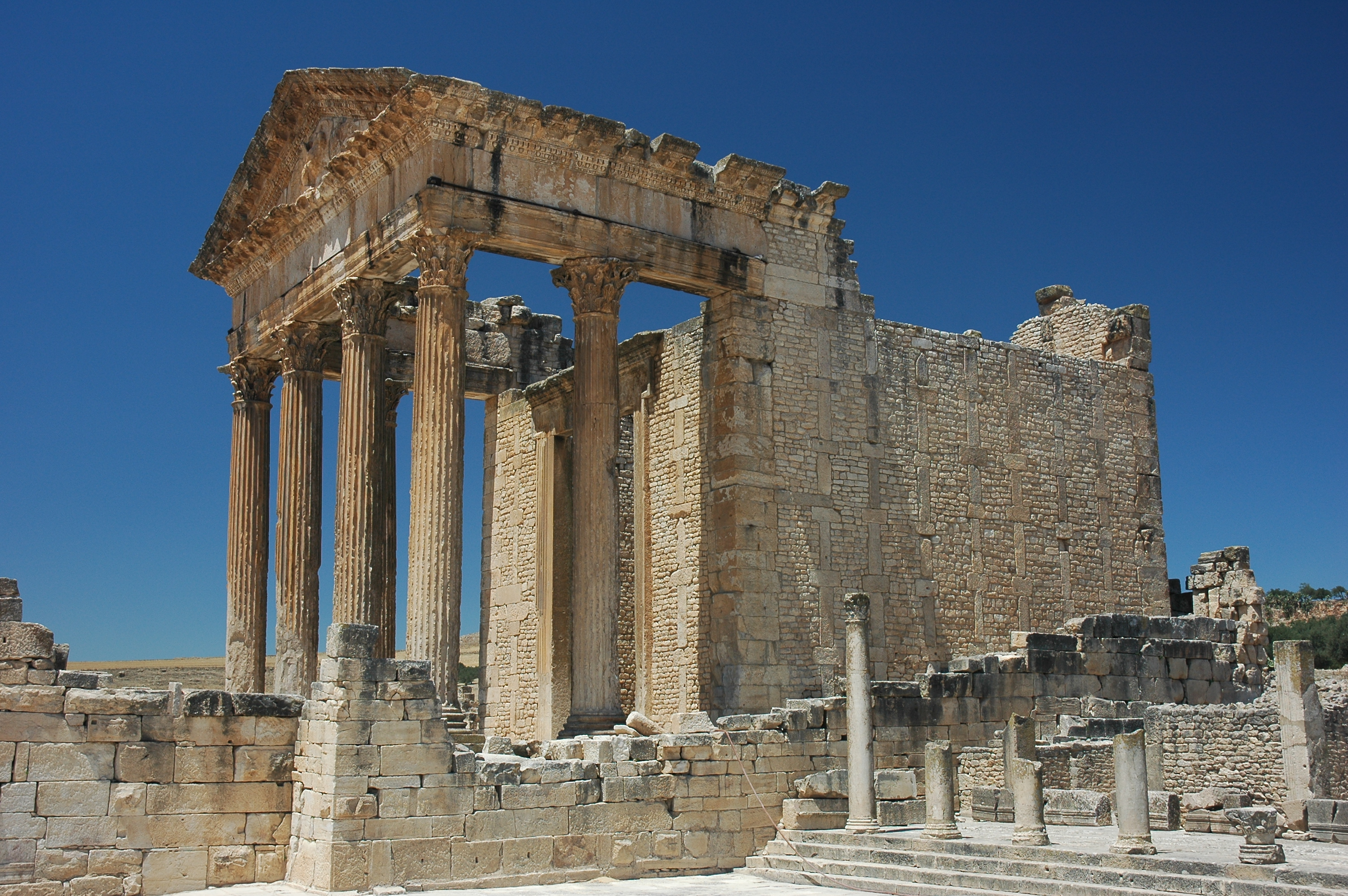
The Capitoline Temple in Dougga

- Djebel Zaghouan ("water temple" at the start of an aqueduct for Carthage)
- Dougga (ruins of several temples)
- Oudna
- Pheradi Majus (Bouficha)
- Segermes
- Thuburbo Majus (ruins of several temples)

=== Turkey ===
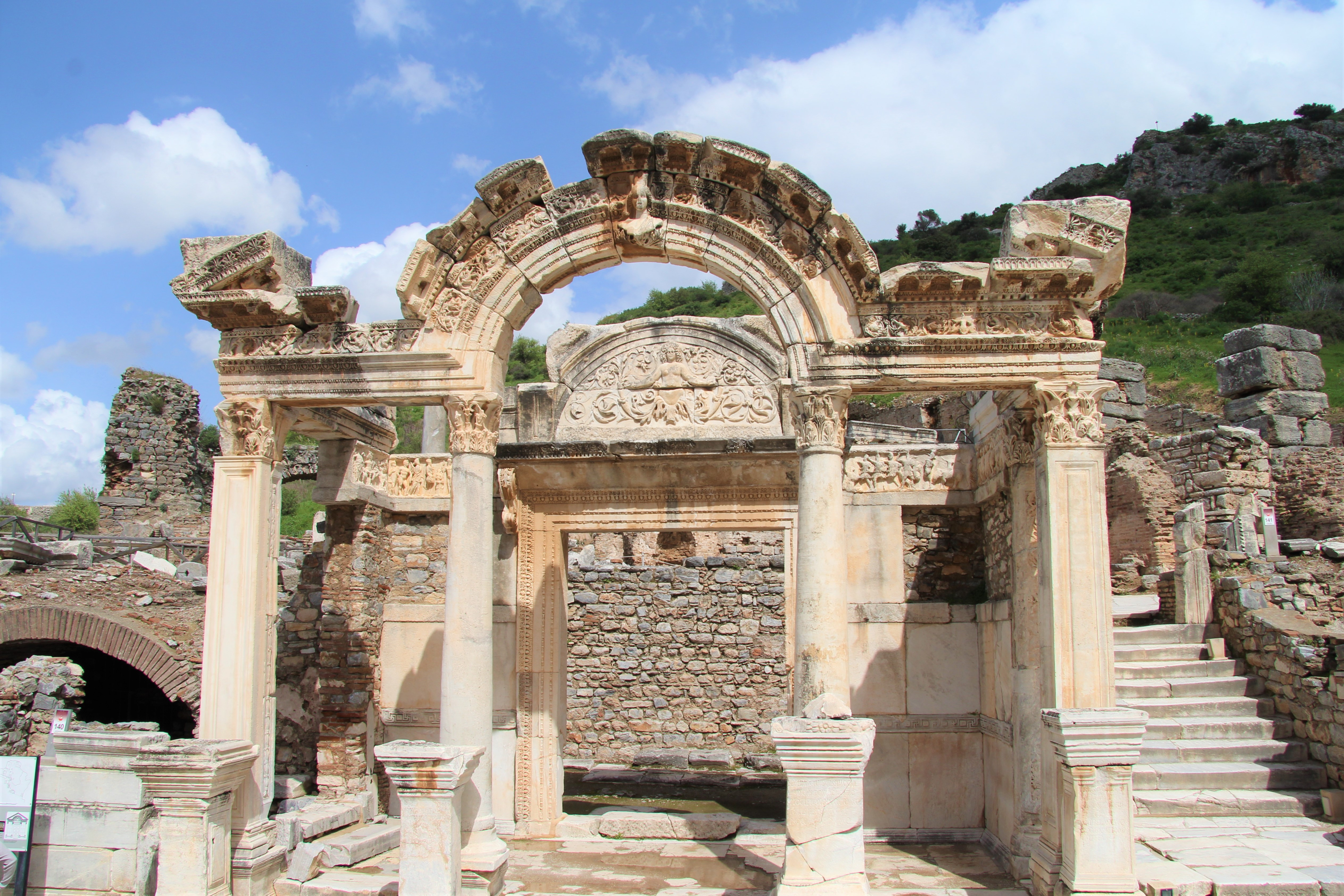
Temple of Hadrian, Ephesus, Turkey

- Aphrodisias, remains of two temples, with unusually good reliefs in situ and in the local museum (the city had especially fine marble).
- Temple of Augustus in Ancyra - Ankara, Turkey
- Ephesus, remains of four temples, that of Hadrian the best, with a nymphaeum of Trajan.
  - Temple of Artemis
- Temple of Trajan, Pergamon, part reconstructed. Remains of other temples.
- Side, remains of three temples
  - Temple of Apollo
- Donuktas Roman Temple - Tarsus
