= Temple of Mercury =

Sanctuary in Ancient Rome on the Aventine

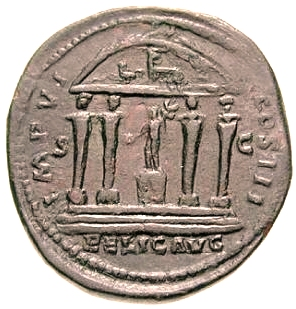
Sestertius of Marcus Aurelius from 172-173 CE

The Temple of Mercury was a sanctuary in Ancient Rome on the Aventine Hill, which was dedicated to the god Mercury.

The temple was founded in 495 BC. It was one of the oldest temples in Rome. It is known to have still existed in the 3rd century. If it remained in use into the 4th century, it would have been closed during the persecution of pagans in the late Roman Empire.

== See also ==
- List of Ancient Roman temples
