= Roman temple of Château-Bas =

Roman ruin in France

- Temple romain de Château-Bas (French)
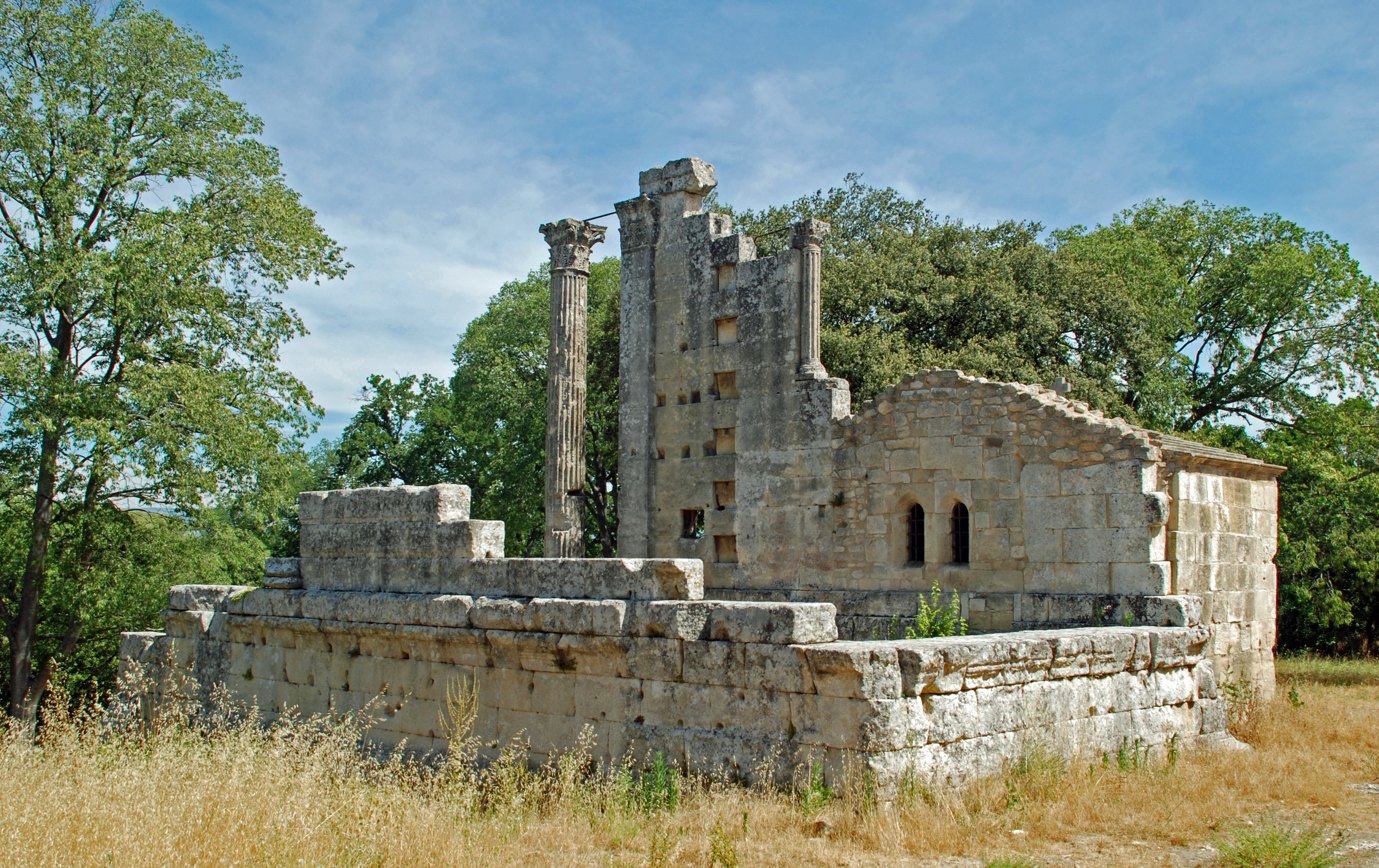
- The surviving Corinthian column and cella foundations of the temple.

- Shown within Provence
- Interactive map of Roman temple of Château-Bas
- 43°40′55″N 05°11′50″E
- Location: Vernègues, Bouches-du-Rhône, France

History
- Built: c. 30–20 BCE (Late 1st century BCE)

Site notes
- Area: Château-Bas Wine Estate

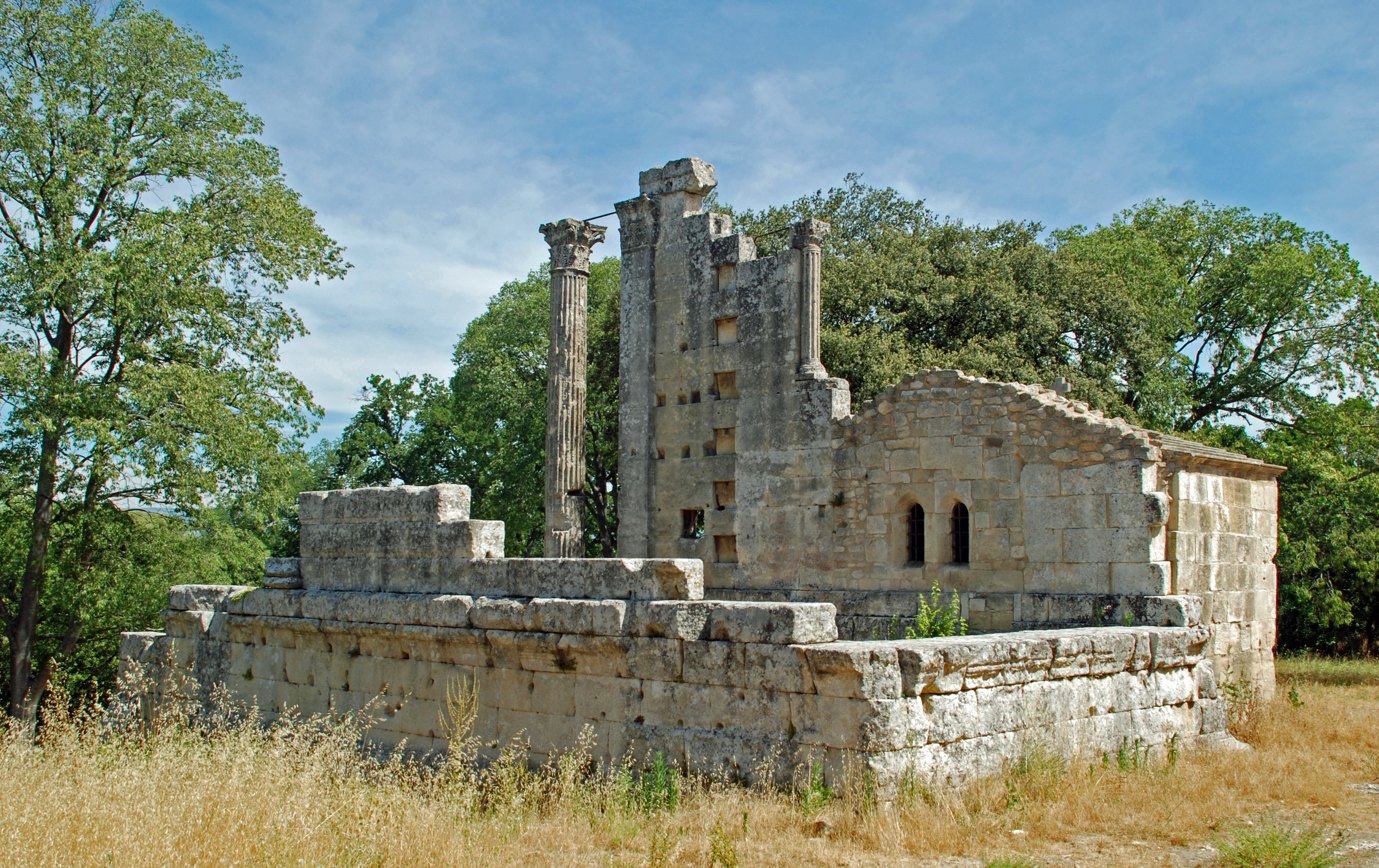
Roman temple of Château-Bas, 2008

The Roman temple of Château-Bas is a Roman ruin located in Vernègues, in the French department of Bouches-du-Rhône in the Provence-Alpes-Côte d'Azur region.

== Location ==
The temple is located to the east of Vernègues, in the park of the “Château-Bas” wine estate located along the road connecting Vernègues and Cazan.

== History ==
The Roman Temple of Château-Bas is a relic Roman of the late 1st century BC.

The temple has been classified as historical monuments since 1840: it is part of the first list of French historical monuments, the list of historical monuments of 1840, which numbered 1,034 monuments. The base walls discovered in the temple are, for their part, classified in 1930.

== Architecture ==
The temple, located in the center of a semicircular sacred enclosure, is today reduced to a few ruins:

- a large fluted column surmounted by a capital with acanthus leaves;
- a smooth pilaster located at the corner of the cella (closed part of the temple) and surmounted by a square capital with acanthus leaves;
- the basement walls of the cella.

A Romanesque chapel of modest dimensions (Saint-Cézaire chapel in Château-Bas) leans against the eastern wall of the Roman temple, partially reusing it.

== See also ==
- List of Ancient Roman temples
