= Temple of the Nymphs =

Temple of Nymphs
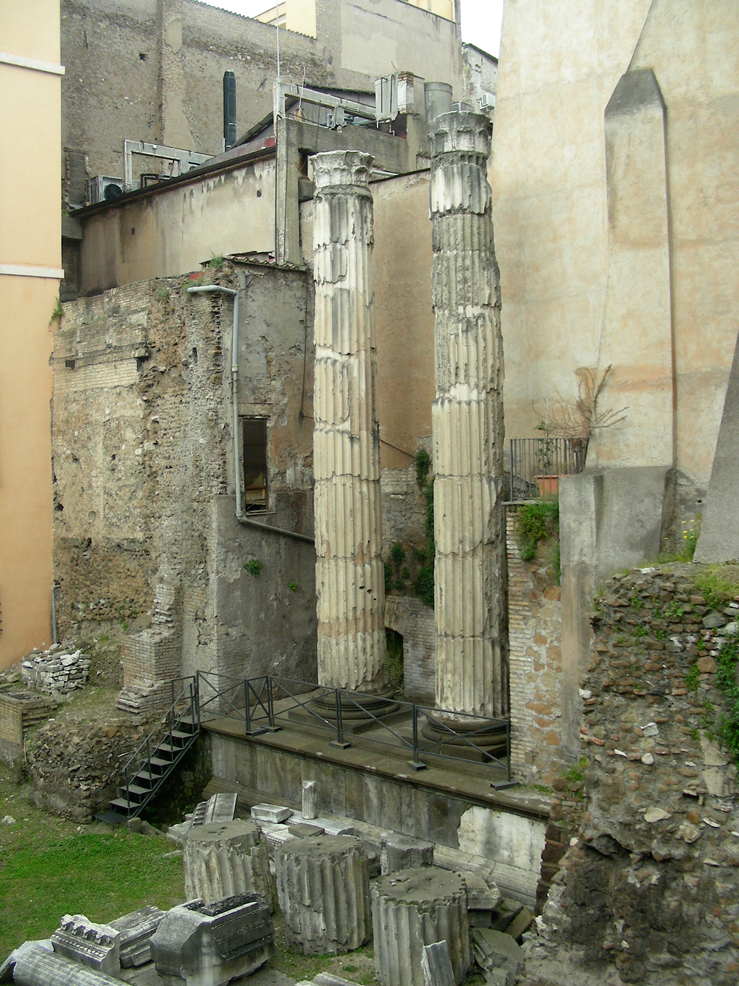
- Remains of the Temple of Nymphes

- Shown in ancient Rome
- Interactive map of Temple of Nymphs
- 41°53′42.49″N 12°28′43.38″E

The Temple of the Nymphs was a temple in ancient Rome dedicated to the Nymphs, evidenced in several sources and generally identified with the remains on what is now via delle Botteghe Oscure.

The temple was founded either in the third century BC or the early second century BC. It was damaged by a fire in the mid-1st century BC and probably also affected by the citywide fire in 80 AD. This temple was on the Campus Martius. If still in use by the 4th century, the temple would have been closed during the persecution of pagans in the late Roman Empire, when the Christian Emperors issued edicts prohibiting all non-Christian worship and sanctuaries.

== See also ==
- List of Ancient Roman temples

== Bibliography ==
- Daniele Manacorda, s.v. "Nymphae, aedes", in Eva Margareta Steinby (ed.), Lexicon topographicum urbis Romae, III, Roma 1996, pp. 350–351.
