= Temple of Juno Regina (Aventine) =

A temple on the Aventine Hill in ancient Rome

The Temple of Juno Regina (Latin: templum or aedes Iuno Regina) was a temple on the Aventine Hill in Rome.

A temple was vowed to "Juno, Queen of Veii" by Marcus Furius Camillus on his conquest of Veii. It was built in 396 BCE and dedicated on September 1. It held a statue of the goddess brought from Veii by Camillus—the temple was later noted for its gifts, sacrifices and miracles and was restored by Augustus, but is not mentioned in any post-Augustan sources. It was on the upper part of the clivus Publicius—two inscriptions relating to the lustral procession of 207 BC are preserved in the Santa Sabina basilica (CIL VI, 364 and CIL VI, 365).

== See also ==
- List of Ancient Roman temples
