= Temple of Fortuna Respiciens =

The Temple of Fortuna Respiciens (Latin: vicus Fortunae Respicientis) was a temple in ancient Rome, sited on the western slopes of the Palatine Hill. It is mentioned in the 4th century Regional Catalogues. The only surviving part of its structure is a polychrome pediment discovered on via di San Gregorio in the Neronian fire layer and now in the Capitoline Museums

== See also ==
- List of Ancient Roman temples
