= Temple of Serapis (Quirinal Hill) =

Sanctuary in ancient Rome

Coordinates: 41.8983°N 12.4855°E

- Templum Serapis
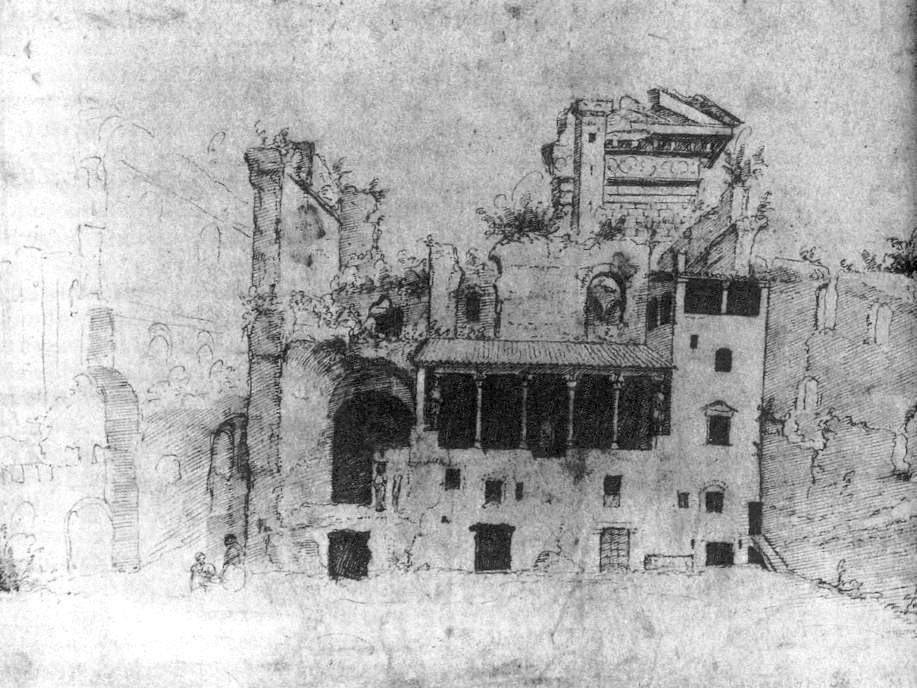
- 16th-century drawing by Marten van Heemskerck showing the remains of the ancient Temple of Serapis.

Religion
- Affiliation: Roman Paganism / Greco-Egyptian Cult
- Deity: Serapis, Isis
- Ecclesiastical or organisational status: Destroyed

Location
- Location: Quirinal Hill, Rome, Italy
- Interactive map of Temple of Serapis

Architecture
- Style: Roman
- Completed: c. 212 AD
- Materials: Marble, Brick

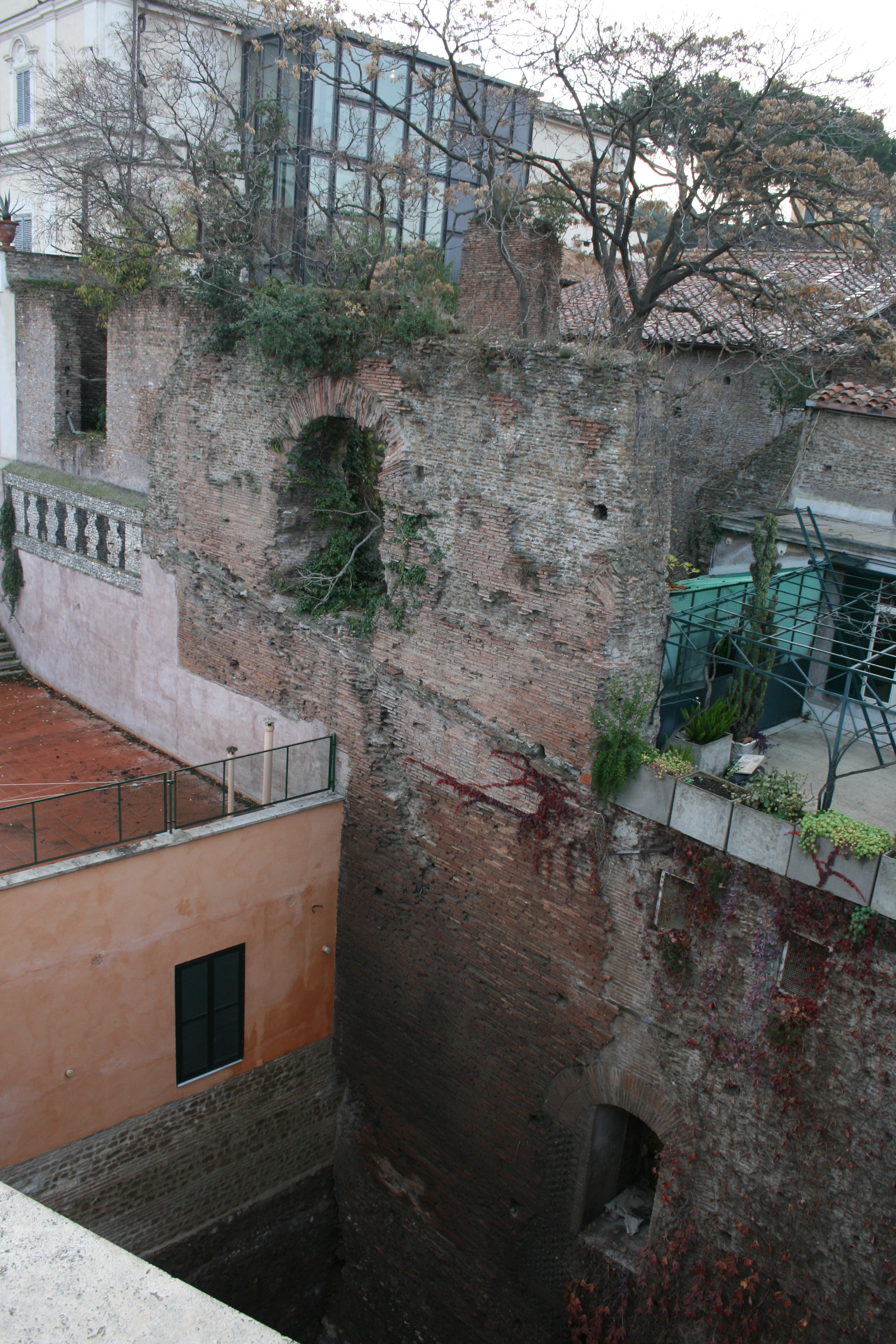
Probable ruins of the Temple of Serapis

The Temple of Serapis on the Quirinal Hill in Rome was an sanctuary in ancient Rome dedicated to the god Serapis and the goddess Isis.

The temple was founded on an unknown date but known to have existed during the reign of Caracalla. It was known as the most monumental temple of the Quirinal Hill. In the 4th century, the temple was closed during the persecution of pagans in the late Roman Empire, after which it was torn down and used as building material.

The gardens of the Palazzo Colonna contain what are believed to be the ruins of the Temple of Serapis.

== See also ==
- List of Ancient Roman temples
