= Temple of Minerva (Aventine) =

- Shown in ancient Rome
- Interactive map of Temple of Minerva
- 41°52′57″N 12°28′57″E

The Temple of Minerva was a temple on the summit of the Aventine Hill in Rome, next to the Temple of Diana. It is now completely disappeared, but the Forma Urbis Romae confirms its appearance as a peripteral hexastyle on a different orientation to the Temple of Diana.

The date and founder of the temple is unknown, but it is known to have existed in the 3rd century BC. It was the centre of the craft guilds in general and, by the end of the 3rd century BC, the writers' and actors' guilds in particular. In 123 BC Gaius Gracchus and his supporters tried in vain to seek refuge in the temple during their flight from Rome. The sanctuary was repaired by Emperor Augustus. The building still existed in the 4th century, when it is mentioned in the Forma Urbis Romae. If still in use by the 4th-century, it would have been closed during the persecution of pagans in the late Roman Empire.

== See also ==
- List of Ancient Roman temples

== Bibliography ==
- Filippo Coarelli, Guida archeologica di Roma, Verona, Arnoldo Mondadori Editore, 1984.
