= Temple of Juno Sospita (Palatine) =

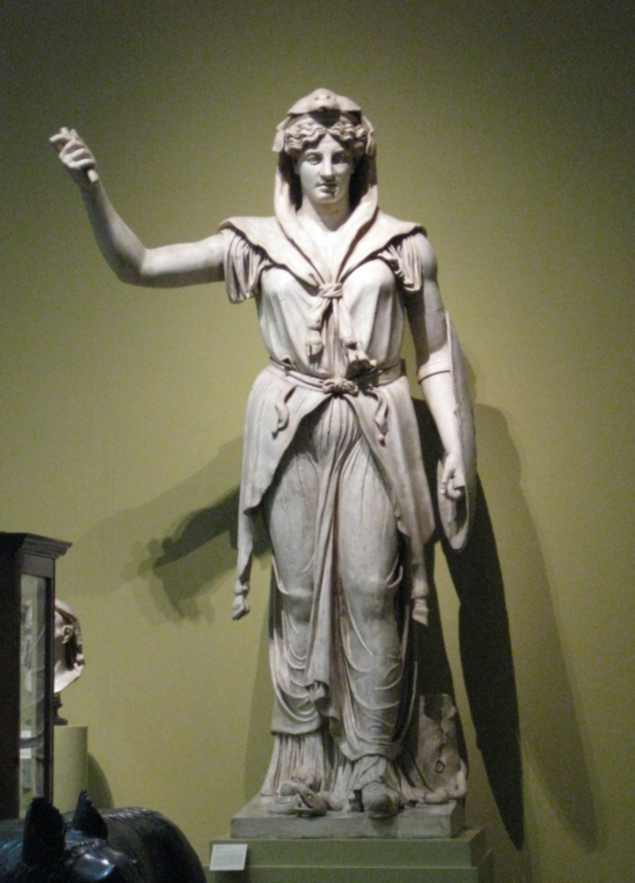
- Juno Sospita

- Shown in ancient Rome
- Interactive map of Temple of Juno Sospita
- 41°53′23″N 12°29′05″E

The Temple of Juno Sospita ("Savior") was an ancient Roman temple on the Palatine Hill in Rome, possibly dating from as early as 338 BC.

It was probably a term for a small shrine adjoining the Temple of the Magna Mater (recorded by Ovid), parts of which remain in Augustan-era opus reticulatum, although most of the remains belong to a Hadrianic restoration.

A minority interpretation is that 'Temple of Juno Sospita' was another term for the Temple of the Magna Mater's auguraculum.

== See also ==
- List of Ancient Roman temples

== Bibliography ==
- Filippo Coarelli, Guida archeologica di Roma, Verona, Arnoldo Mondadori Editore, 1984
