= Temple of Minerva, Assisi =

Roman temple transformed into a church

Temple of Minerva
- Tempio di Minerva (Italian)
- Templum Minervae (Latin)
- Shown within Umbria
- Interactive map of Temple of Minerva
- 43°04′17″N 12°36′53″E
- Location: Assisi, Perugia, Italy

History
- Built: c. 30 BCE (Late Republican / Augustan period)
- Built by: Gnaeus Caesius and Titus Caesius Priscus

Site notes
- Area: Piazza del Comune

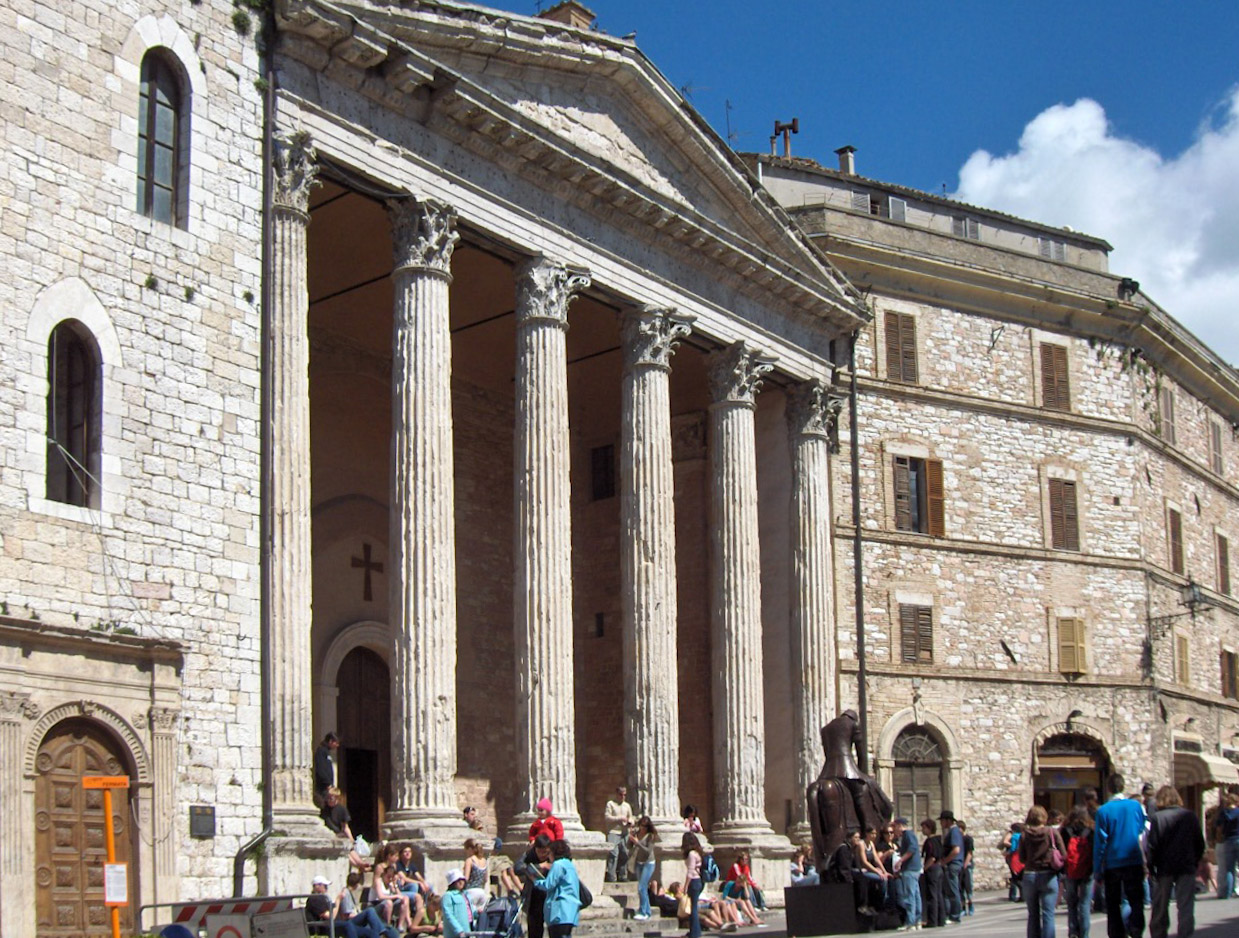
The Temple of Minerva, Assisi.

The Temple of Minerva (Italian: Tempio di Minerva) is an ancient Roman building located in Assisi, Umbria, central Italy. Since 1539, it has housed the church of Santa Maria sopra Minerva, which was renovated in the Baroque style during the 17th century.

== History ==
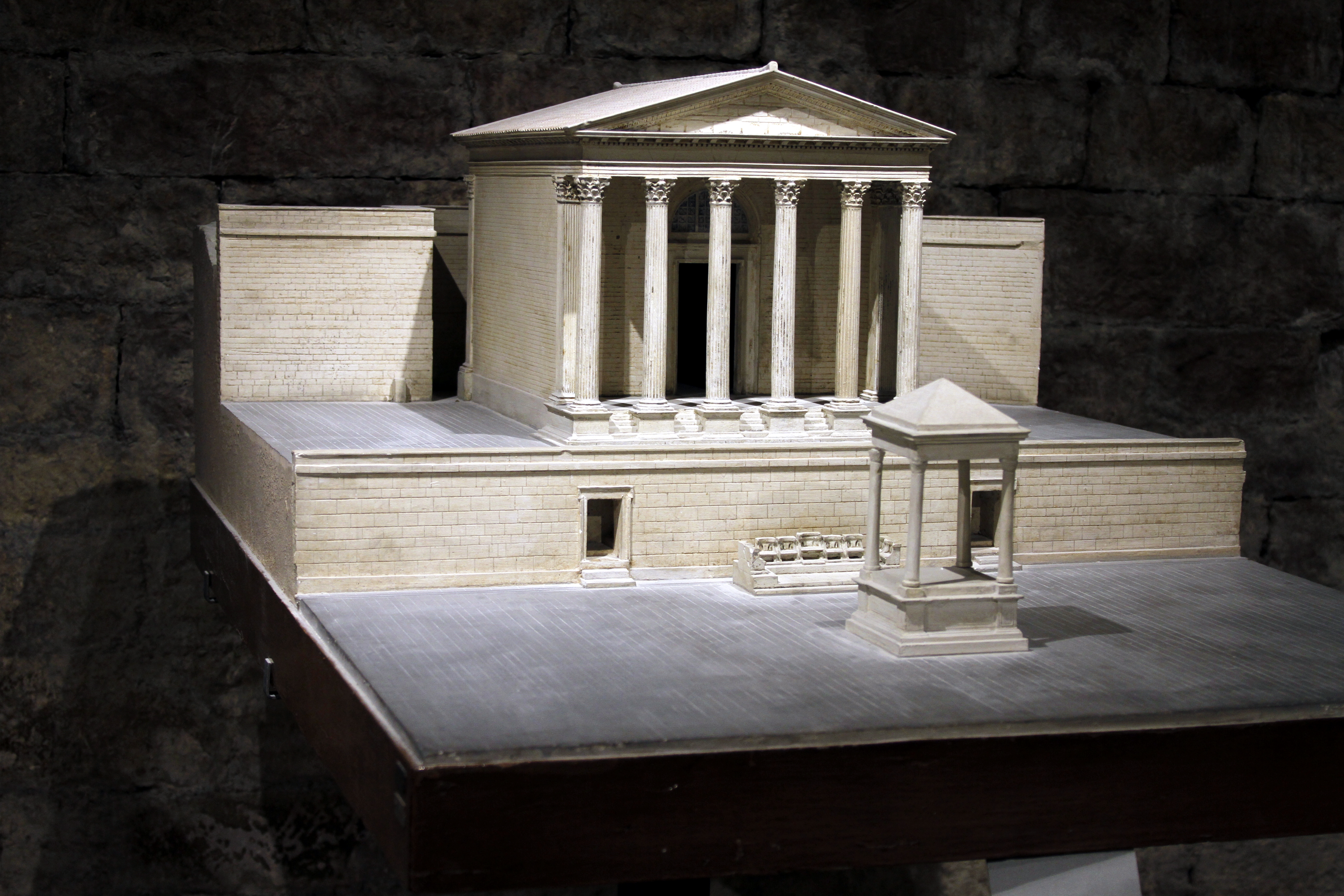
Model of the ancient Roman forum of Assisi, with the Temple of Minerva at the center.

The temple was built in the 1st century BC by Gnaeus Caesius and Titus Caesius Priscus, two of the city's quattuorviri, who also financed its construction. Although the temple is traditionally attributed to the goddess Minerva — due to the discovery of a female statue — a dedicatory stone to Hercules has also been found, suggesting that it may have been originally dedicated to this male demi-god. During the Middle Ages, the temple served as a tribunal with an adjoining jail, as evidenced by a fresco by Giotto in the Upper Basilica of St. Francis, which depicts the barred windows of the church.

Of the ancient temple, the façade has been preserved, with six Corinthian columns supporting the architrave and a small pediment. The columns were originally covered by a very strong plaster, which was perhaps colored. The cella was completely demolished during the church's construction, in the 16th century, while a small section of the temple was found in the 20th century near the altar.

The temple was visited and described by the German poet Goethe during his travels in Italy, as the first ancient structure in good condition seen during his life (1786).

== See also ==
- List of Ancient Roman temples
