= Temple of Minerva Medica =

Building in Rome, Italy

Temple Minerva Medica
- Shown within Augustan Rome
- Interactive map of Temple Minerva Medica
- 41°53′31″N 12°30′08″E

The temple of Minerva Medica (akin to the temple of Apollo Medicus) was a temple in ancient Rome, built on the Esquiline Hill in the Republican era, though no remains of it have been found. Since the 17th century, it has been wrongly identified with the ruins of a nymphaeum on a nearby site, on account of the erroneous impression that the Athena Giustiniani had been found in its ruins.

== Location ==
Its position in the regionary catalogue, between the campus Viminalis and the temple of Isis Patricia, points to a site in the northern part of Region V. But hundreds of votive offerings, including one in which the temple is attested, were discovered in the Via Curva (the modern Via Carlo Botta), just west of the Via Merulana, and this may be the better location. Some tuff walls, resembling ritual trenches known as favissae were also found there.

== See also ==
- List of Ancient Roman temples

Preceded by Temple of Janus	Landmarks of Rome; Temple of Minerva Medica	Succeeded by Temple of Portunus
