= Temple of Diana (Rome) =

Temple in ancient Rome

Coordinates: 41°52′58.18″N 12°28′59.50″E

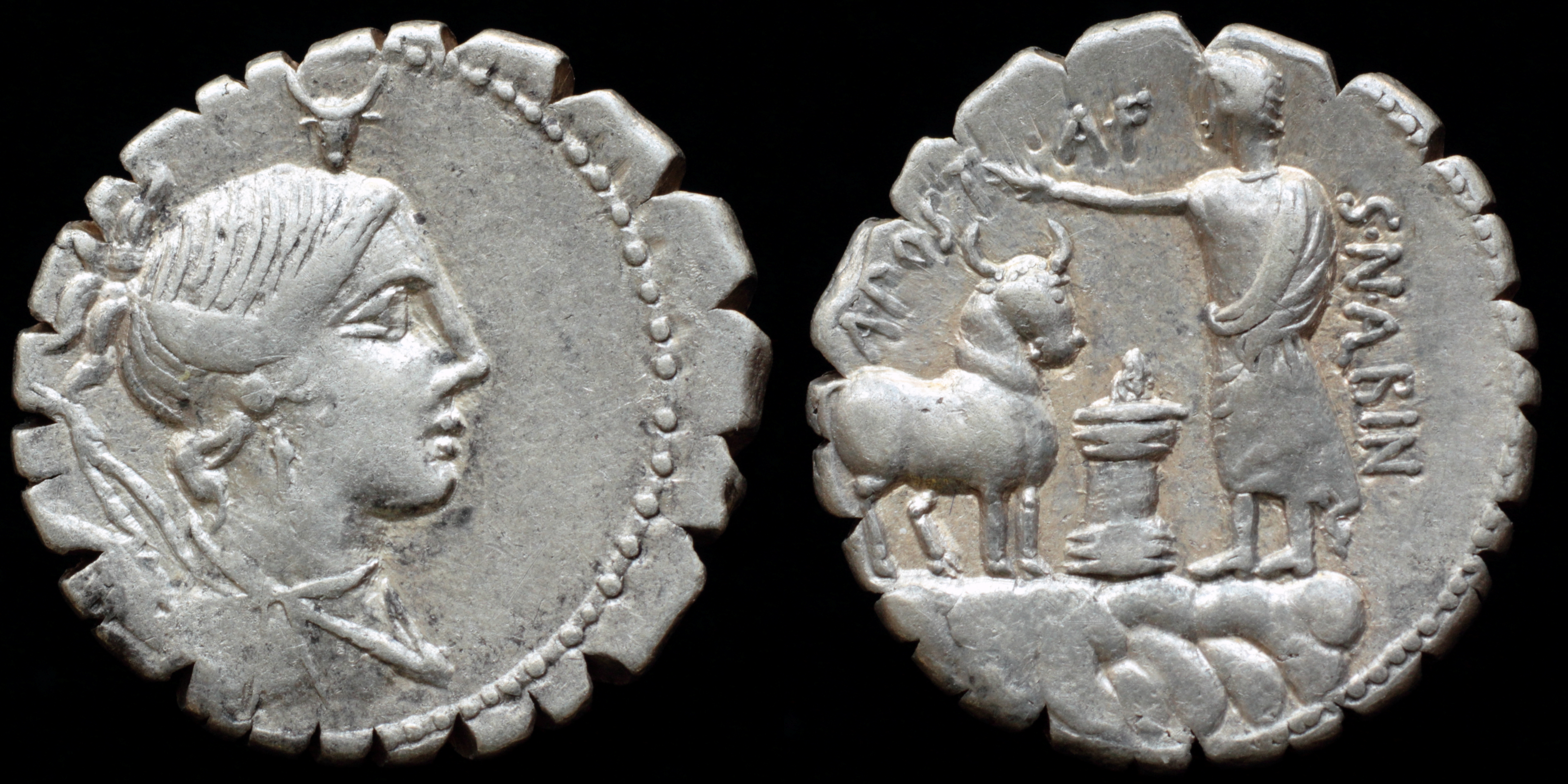

First side of the image: O: Diana with bow and quiver over the shoulder and bucranium above. Bucranium, skull of sacrificed bull, was displayed in the temple of Diana.
Second side of the image: R: Sacrificing scene on the stone platform. Togate figure holding sprinkler is about to sacrifice bull, altar between them. A·POST·A·F S·N·(AL)BIN
Silver serrate denarius struck by A. Postumius A.f. S.n. Albinus in Rome 81 BC. ref.: SRCV I 296, Crawford 372/1, Sydenham 745, RSC I Postumia 7

The Temple of Diana was an edifice in ancient Rome which, according to the early semi-legendary history of Rome, was built in the 6th century BC during the reign of the king Servius Tullius.

== History ==
According to Livy, word had come to Rome of the new and glorious temple of Artemis at Ephesus, and it was told that the temple had been constructed through the combined effort of the cities of Asia Minor. The king of Rome, Servius Tullius, extolled the virtues of such an act of concord to the cities of the Latins, and convinced them to work with the Roman people to build a temple to Diana in Rome. The temple was built upon the Aventine Hill.

Soon after the construction of the temple, a cow of remarkable beauty and size was born to the head of a Sabine family. It was foretold by the augurs that sovereignty would come to the city whose citizen sacrificed the cow to Diana. Accordingly, the Sabine man took the cow to the temple of Diana in Rome, and led her to the altar. However, before he could sacrifice her, the Roman priest of the temple confronted him, and asked whether he would make the sacrifice with impure hands, imploring the man to go and cleanse his hands in the Tiber. Once the Sabine had left the temple to go to the Tiber, the priest immediately sacrificed the cow, to the great satisfaction of Rome and its king.

Later temple dedications often took as their model the ritual formulas and cult regulations devised for the Temple of Diana on the Aventine.

If still in use by the 4th-century, it would have been closed during the persecution of pagans in the late Roman Empire.

== Legacy ==
A short street named the Via del Tempio di Diana commemorates the site of the temple today and part of its wall is located within one of the halls of the Apuleius Restaurant.

== See also ==
- List of Ancient Roman temples
