= Temple of Minerva Chalcidica =

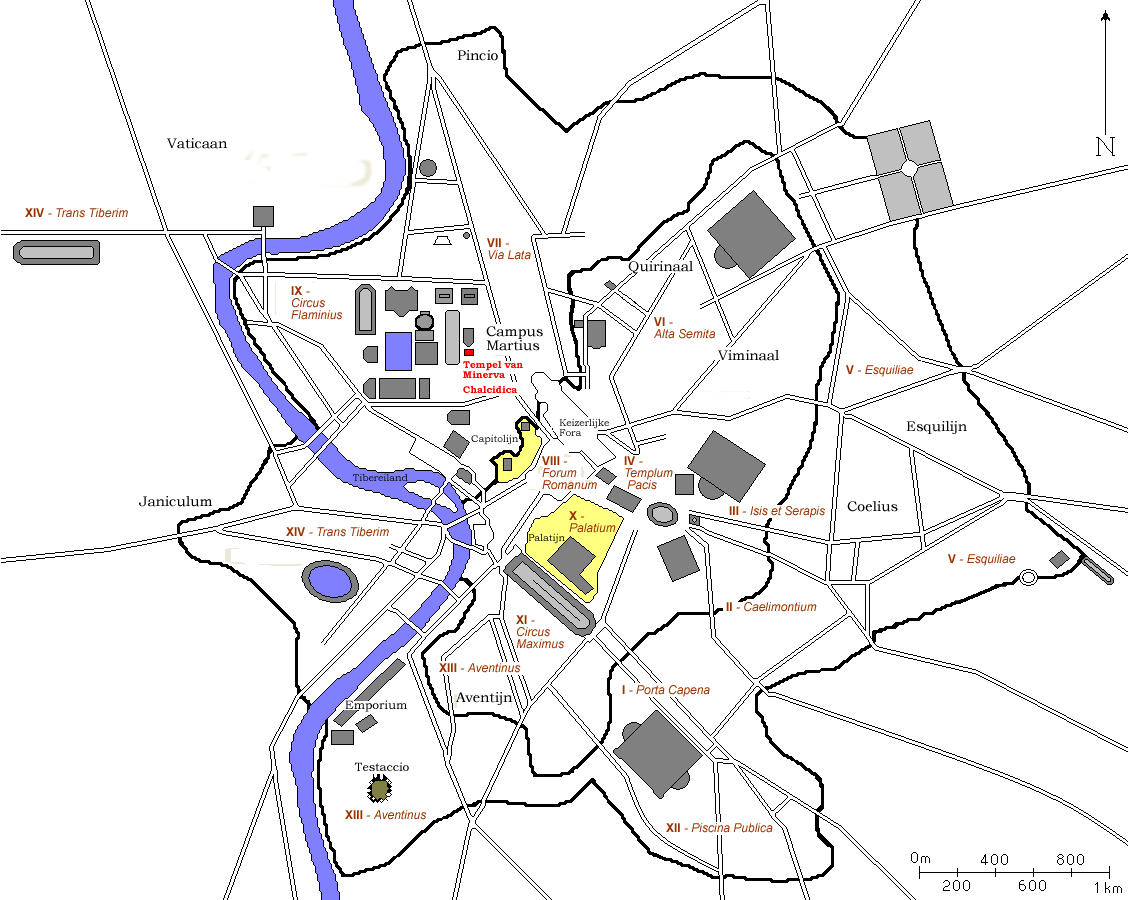
- Tempel van Minerva Chalcidica

- Shown in ancient Rome
- Interactive map of Temple of Minerva Chalcidica
- 41°53′51″N 12°28′48″E

The Temple of Minerva Chalcidica or Minervium was a small temple in the Campus Martius in ancient Rome, dedicated to Minerva. It was built by Pompey the Great in around 60 BC (next to the later site of the Temple of Isis and Serapis) and probably destroyed in the fire of 80 AD which destroyed the Campus Martius. It was then rebuilt by Domitian.

Its name survives in that of the 8th century basilica of Santa Maria sopra Minerva.

== See also ==
- List of Ancient Roman temples
