= Temple of Zeus Cyrius =

Ancient Greek temple in Syria

Coordinates: 34.745007°N 40.727913°E

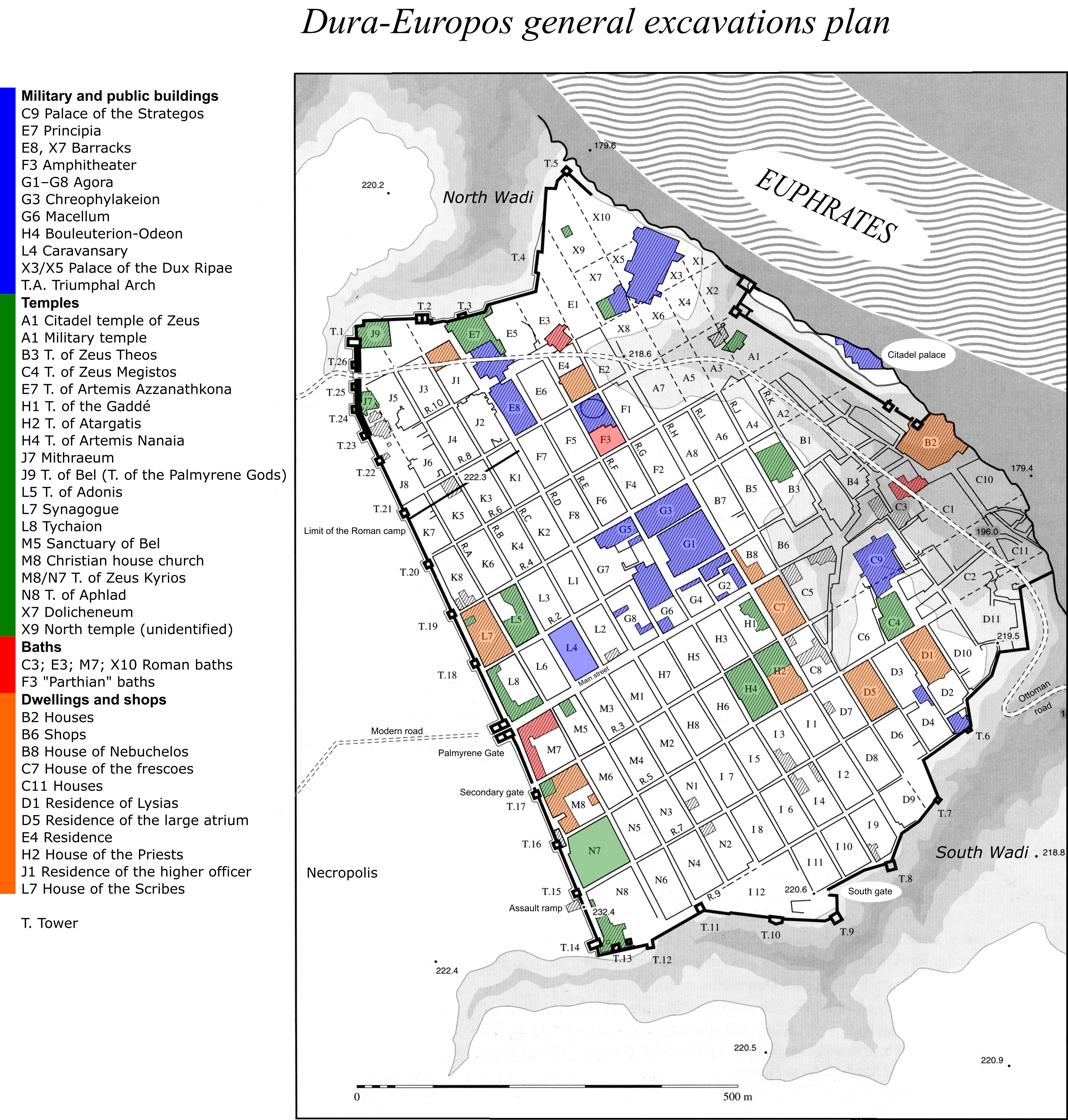
Dura-Europos general excavations plan, Temple of Zeus Kyrios is marked as M8/N7

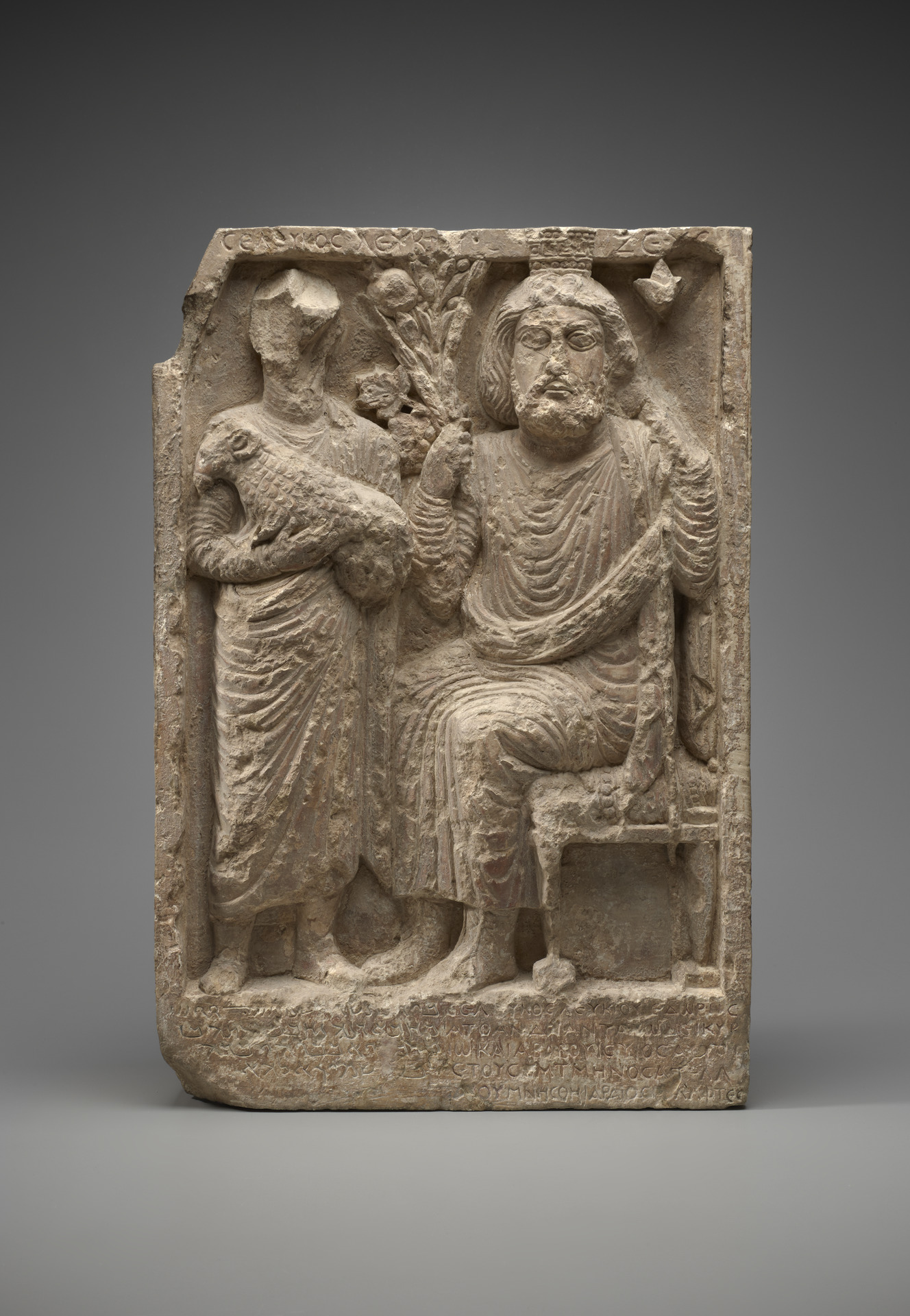
The stele from the temple

The Temple of Zeus Cyrius stood in the city of Dura-Europos (Syria) and The construction of the original temenos is dated by the inscriptions above its altar and on its cult reliefs to the end of the second decade of the first century after Christ. It was excavated in 1934 by a joint French-American expedition.

The small sanctuary directly abutted a tower of the city wall, on the western side of the city. This site seems to have been chosen deliberately, since towers are a well-attested part of Syrian temple architecture.

The sanctuary is the smallest temple excavated to date at Dura-Europos. At first it consisted of only a single room abutting the tower, with an altar against the wall. In a second phase, two further rooms were added to the north. They had a single entrance and were equipped with benches. Even in the final phase of the structure, there were only three rooms, but the cult room which contained the altar was significantly expanded. It became a large, long hall which may not have had a roof (and would then be better referred to as a courtyard). North of this were two smaller rooms: an entranceway with a door onto the street, and a room with benches on all sides. The whole structure was 15.8 metres long in this phase.

A stele was found in the sanctuary, with either a cult image or a dedicatory relief on it. The stele shows Zeus seated at right and a donor who appears to be a Palmyrene man. The stele has a Palmyrene language inscription which states that it was erected by Baratheh, son of Luke and his son Abubuhi in AD 31. The god is named as Baalshamin. A Greek inscription also gives the name of the donor as Seleukos son of Luke and names the god as Zeus. A further Greek inscription on the stele again names Seleukos, gives the date, and refers to the god as Zeus Kyrios.

== Bibliography ==
- M. I. Rostovtzeff, F. E. Brown, C. B. Welles: The excavations at Dura-Europos: Preliminary Report of Seventh and Eighth Season of Work 1933–1934 and 1934–1935. Yale University Press, New Haven u. a. 1939, S. 284–309.
