= Temple of Ceres, Liber and Libera =

Ancient Roman temple

The Sanctuary of Ceres, Liber and Libera (Latin: Aedes Cereris, Liberi et Liberae) was a temple to Ceres, Liber Pater and Libera (equivalent to Demeter, Dionysus and Kore or Ariadne) built on the Aventine Hill in Rome. It was dedicated in 494 BC. The temple was destroyed by fire in 31 BC, but was repaired. It was still in function in the 4th-century, but would have been closed during the persecution of pagans in the late Roman Empire.

== See also ==
- List of Ancient Roman temples

== Bibliography ==
- Filippo Coarelli, Guida archeologica di Roma, Verona, Arnoldo Mondadori Editore, 1984.
- Carmine Ampolo et al., Roma e l'Italia: radices imperii, Milano, Garzanti-Scheiwiller, 1990.
