= Temple of Minerva (Forum of Nerva) =

Ancient Roman temple

The Temple of Minerva was a temple on the short side of the Forum of Nerva in Rome. It was completed by Nerva in 97 AD, who harboured a particular devotion for goddess. It was still well-preserved in the 16th century, when pope Paul V took materials from it for his fontana dell'Acqua Paola on the Janiculum Hill and for the Borghese chapel in Santa Maria Maggiore.

== See also ==
- List of Ancient Roman temples

== Bibliography ==
- Filippo Coarelli, Guida archeologica di Roma, Verona, Arnoldo Mondadori Editore, 1984.
