= Roman temple of Alcántara =

Preserved ancient Roman temple in Spain

Coordinates: 39.721708°N 6.891554°W

- Templo romano de Alcántara
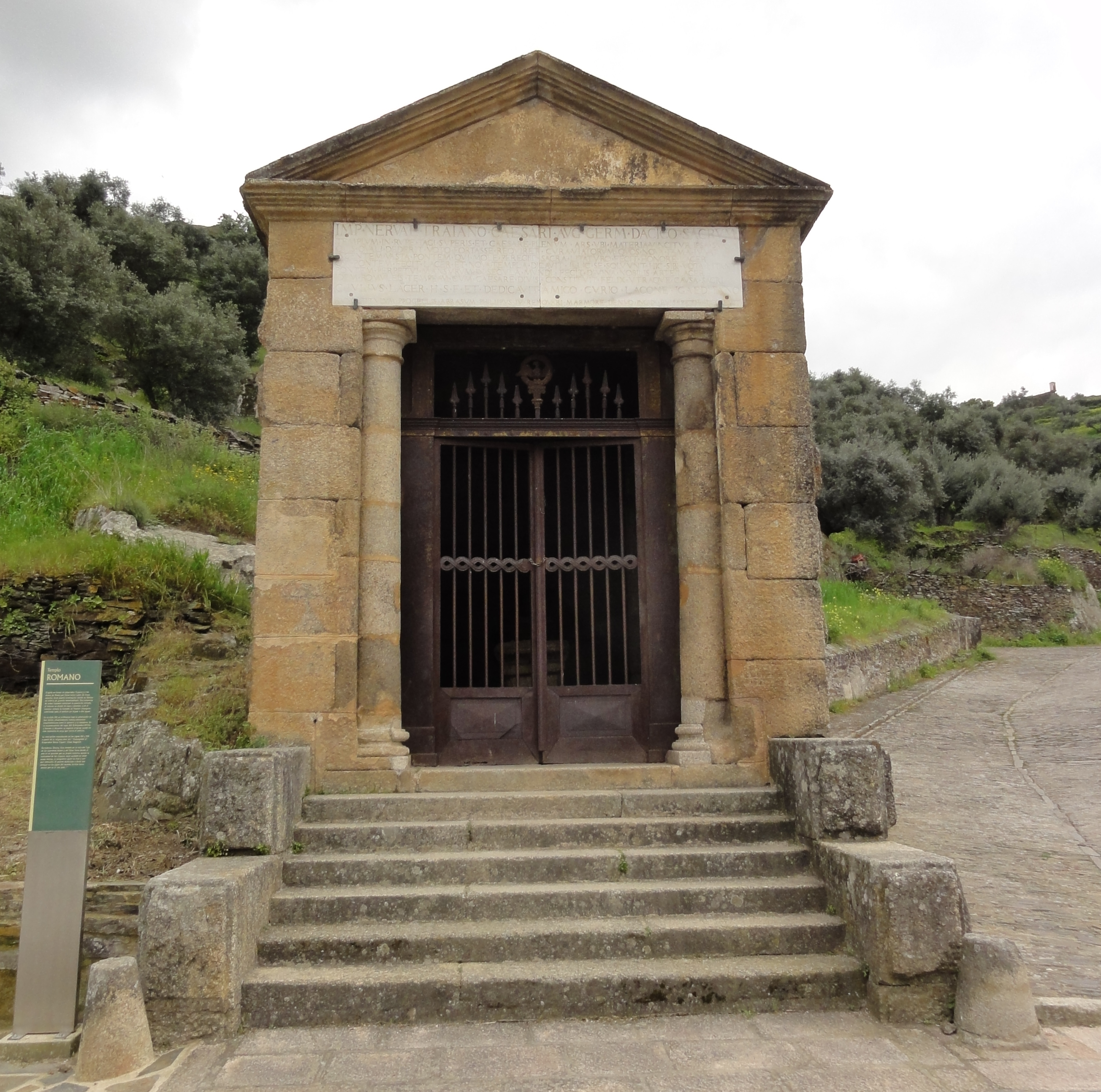
- Front facade view of the remarkably intact Roman temple of Alcántara
- Interactive map of the Roman temple of Alcántara area
- Former names: Chapel of San Julián (converted during the Middle Ages)

General information
- Type: Roman temple (Votive temple / Imperial cult sanctuary)
- Architectural style: Ancient Roman architecture (In antis style with Tuscan order)
- Location: Alcántara, Cáceres, Extremadura, Spain; Lusitania, Hispania, Next to the Alcántara Bridge, 10980 Alcántara, Cáceres, Spain
- Current tenants: None (protected archaeological monument / tourist attraction)
- Construction started: c. 98 AD
- Completed: c. 103 CE
- Client: Dedicated to the Emperor Trajan and the deified emperors of Rome
- Owner: Government of Spain

Dimensions
- Other dimensions: Features a single chamber (cella) fronted by 2 Tuscan columns between projecting sidewalls

Technical details
- Structural system: Load-bearing stone masonry (constructed entirely from local granite ashlar blocks)
- Size: Small rectangular floor plan layout
- Floor count: 1 (single-story layout elevated on a podium with access stairs)

Design and construction
- Architect: Gaius Julius Lacer
- Awards: Bien de Interés Cultural (Spain's heritage protection classification)

The Roman temple of Alcántara is located at one side of the Alcántara Bridge, Cáceres, Extremadura (Spain). Along with the Roman temple of Vic, it is one of the only two Roman temples preserved nearly complete in Spain.

== History ==
The bridge, triumphal arch and temple were all designed by the same architect, Gaius Julius Lacer, who dedicated the last to the deified emperors of Rome. He concluded his work in 103 AD. The origin of the architect appears to be local, but stylistically the features of the building appear closely related to contemporary buildings in the Italica province. This suggests that the architect either studied in what is today Italy, or was born there and later moved to the Lusitania province. The temple was constructed as an offering to Trajan and the gods of Rome. If still in use, the temple would have been closed during the persecution of pagans under the Christian emperors of the fourth century. After the conquest of Cáceres in 1169 by Ferdinand II of Leon, the temple was converted into a chapel of St. Julian; one reason the building remains so well-preserved. The conversion saw the addition of a belfry and a skull with tibias. The temple would eventually become a milestone along the pilgrimage route to Santiago de Compostela. The architect was buried in the temple; his tomb is still preserved inside.

== Architecture ==
Alcántara is a small votive temple in antis, rectangular, with a single camera or cell. The temple is constructed of granite. The entrance is flanked by two Tuscan columns and accessed by an exterior staircase, covered with a gabled roof made of slabs of stone, with a pediment with trim at the edges and a smooth tympanum without decoration. The bill or peak of the facade is reminiscent of the Treasury of Athens at Delphi. The bridge and temple are built with granite blocks of equal size.

== Inscriptions ==
Presented in the lintel of the temple is an inscription (now not original, but a subsequent copy, as the last lines make clear), mostly in elegiac couplets, attesting to the dedication by the architect Gaius Julius Lacer to the Emperor Trajan.

IMP⸱NERVAE⸱TRAIANO⸱CAESARI⸱AVG⸱GERM⸱DAC⸱SACRVM

TEMPLVM⸱IN⸱RVPE⸱TAGI⸱SVPERIS⸱ET⸱CAESARE⸱PLENVM⸱ARS⸱VBI⸱MATERIA⸱VINCITVR⸱IPSA⸱SVA
QVIS⸱QVALI⸱DEDERIT⸱VOTO⸱FORTASSE⸱REQVIRET⸱CVRA⸱VIATORVM⸱QVOS⸱NOVA⸱FAMA⸱IVVAT
INGENTEM⸱VASTA⸱PONTEM⸱QVI⸱MOLE⸱PEREGIT⸱SACRA⸱LITATVRO⸱FECIT⸱HONORE⸱LACER
QVI⸱PONTEM⸱FECIT⸱LACER⸱ET⸱NOVA⸱TEMPLA⸱DICAVIT⸱ILLIC⸱SE⸱SOLVVNT⸱HIC⸱SIBI⸱VOTA⸱LITANT
PONTEM⸱PERPETVI⸱MANSVRVM⸱IN⸱SAECVLA⸱MVNDI⸱FECIT⸱DIVINA⸱NOBILIS⸱ARTE⸱LACER
IDEM⸱ROMVLEIS⸱TEMPLVM⸱CVM⸱CAESARE⸱DIVIS⸱CONSTITVIT⸱FELIX⸱VTRAQVE⸱CAVSA⸱SACRI

C[aius]⸱IVLIVS⸱LACER⸱H[oc]⸱S[acellum]⸱F[ecit]⸱ET⸱DEDICAVIT⸱AMICO⸱CVRIO⸱LACONE⸱IGEDITANO

HVNC⸱TITVLVM⸱PROCELLIS⸱ABRASVM⸱PHILIPPVS⸱IV⸱RENOVARI⸱MARMORI⸱DENVO⸱INCIDI⸱ELISABETH⸱II⸱DECREVIT

English translation:

To Emperor Nerva Trajan Caesar Augustus, Germanicus, [conqueror] of Dacia, is enshrined

this temple on a cliff on the Tagus, occupied by the gods and Caesar,
where skill itself is overcome by its own task.
Perhaps the attention of travelers, whom the new information pleases,
will inquire who, and under what vow, offered it.
It was Lacer who completed this enormous bridge with great effort
and carried out the rituals with auspicious sacrifices.
Lacer who made the bridge also dedicated the new temple:
there his vows are fulfilled, here they are made auspicious by sacrifices.
The illustrious Lacer, with divine art, made the bridge
to last through the ages of the perpetual world.
The same man set up the temple devoted to the Roman gods along with Caesar,
happy as the cause of both sanctuaries.

Gaius Julius Lacer made this temple and dedicated it with his friend Curius Laco Igaeditanus [from the town of Idanha-a-Velha].

This inscription, weathered by storms, Philip IV ordered to be restored and Isabel II ordered it to be newly cut in marble.

== See also ==
- List of Ancient Roman temples
