= Temple of Apollo (Pompeii) =

Oldest Roman temple in Pompeii

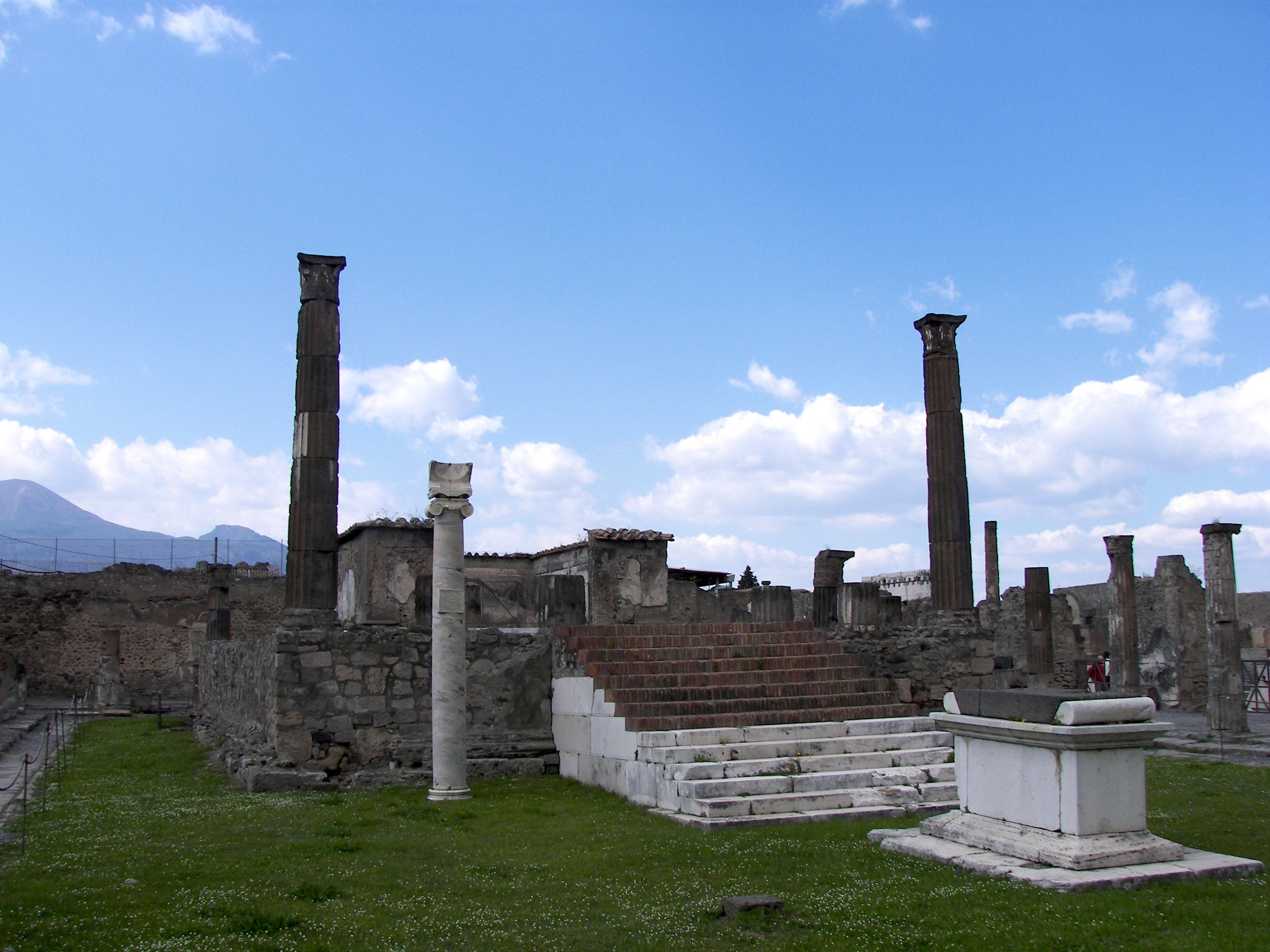
- Ruins of the Temple of Apollo in Pompeii
- Interactive map of Temple of Apollo
- 40°44′57″N 14°29′04″E
- Type: Temple
- Location: Pompeii
- Region: Campania
- Part of: Archaeological Park of Pompeii

History
- Founded: 6th century BC (earliest remains), remodeled 2nd century BC
- Abandoned: 79 AD (destroyed by the eruption of Mount Vesuvius in 79 AD)

Site notes
- Material: Tufa, Travertine, Stucco
- Condition: Ruined

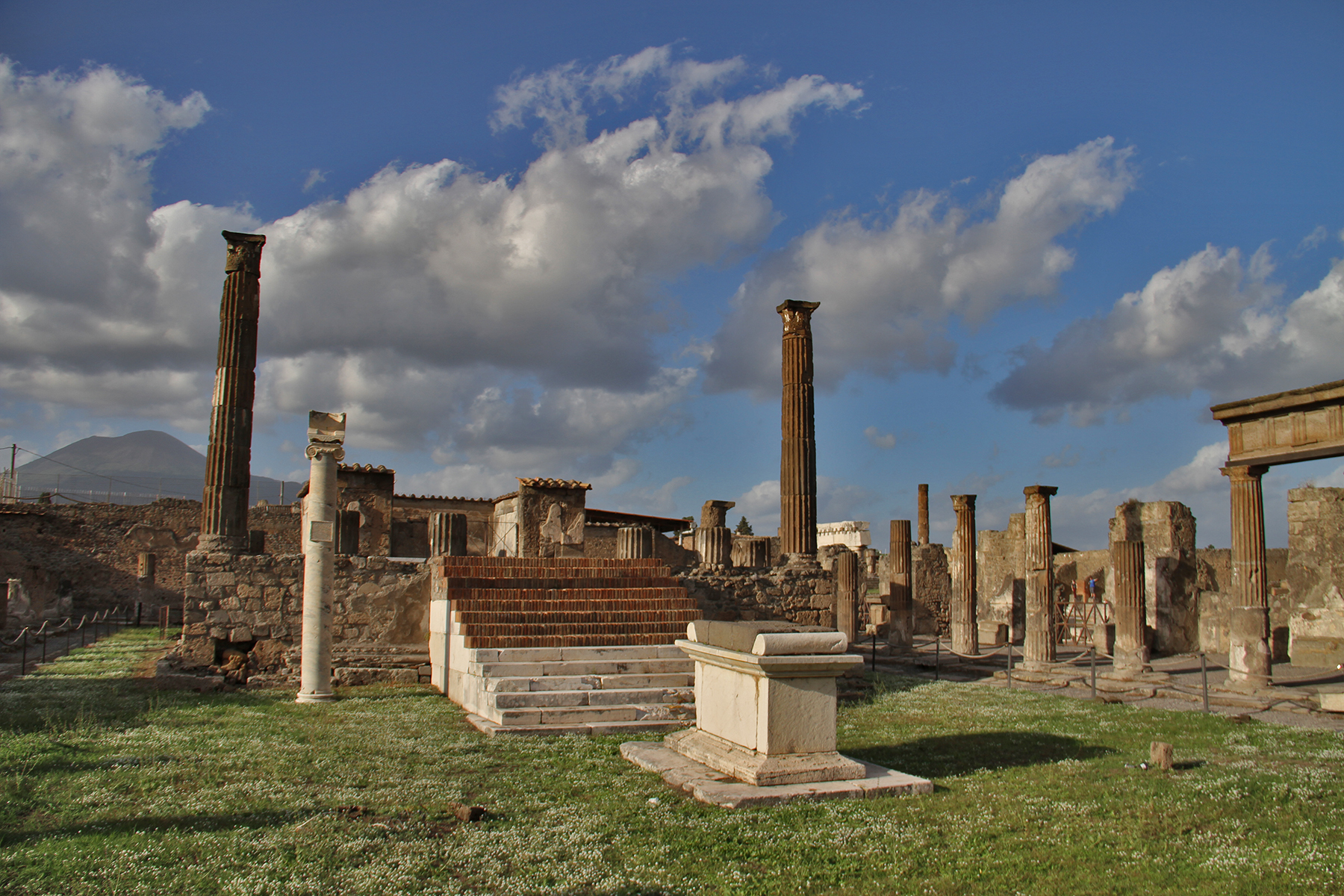
The Temple of Apollo in Pompeii. Mount Vesuvius is to the far left.

The Temple of Apollo, also known as the Sanctuary of Apollo, is a Roman temple built in 120 BC and dedicated to the Greek and Roman god Apollo in the ancient Roman town of Pompeii, southern Italy. The sanctuary was a public space influenced by Roman colonists to be dedicated to Greco-Roman religion and culture.

== Architecture in the Forum ==
Located in the forum (market place) and facing the northern side of the town, it is the town's most important religious building. It was one of the two earliest temples built in Pompeii, the other being the Temple of Minerva and Hercules, which was near the forum. The cult of Apollo, imported from Greece, was widespread in Campania, and from excavations in the temple's vicinity has been shown to have been present in Pompeii since the 6th century BC. The sanctuary's present appearance dates from its 2nd-century BC rebuild, and a further reconstruction to repair damage from the 62 earthquake, in which a large part of the temple collapsed and repairs which were left incomplete at the time of the eruption. The temple, in the center of a sacred enclosure, was surrounded on all four sides by a wide series of tuff columns from Nocera, originally grooved and with Ionic capitals, that were being replaced with stucco columns and Corinthian capitals painted in yellow, red and dark blue.

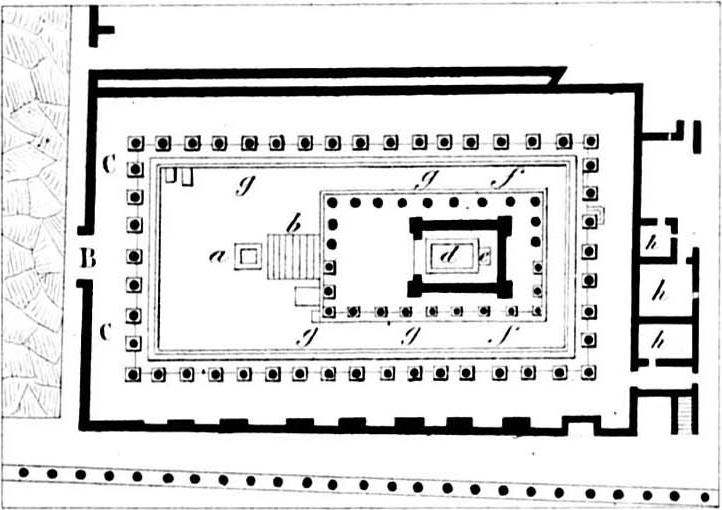
Plan of the temple

The temple itself, a peripteros with 48 Ionic columns, was on a high podium and entered up an imposing set of steps, in a fusion of Greek and Italic architectural ideas. Unusually, the cella is sited further back with respect to the peristyle. In front of the steps may still be seen a white marble altar on a travertine base, with a Latin inscription giving the names of the quattuorviri who dedicated it. To side of the steps is an Ionic column that supported a sundial and an inscribed plaque that was donated by a pair of magistrates, who are recorded to have donated another plaque and seat at the Triangular Forum.

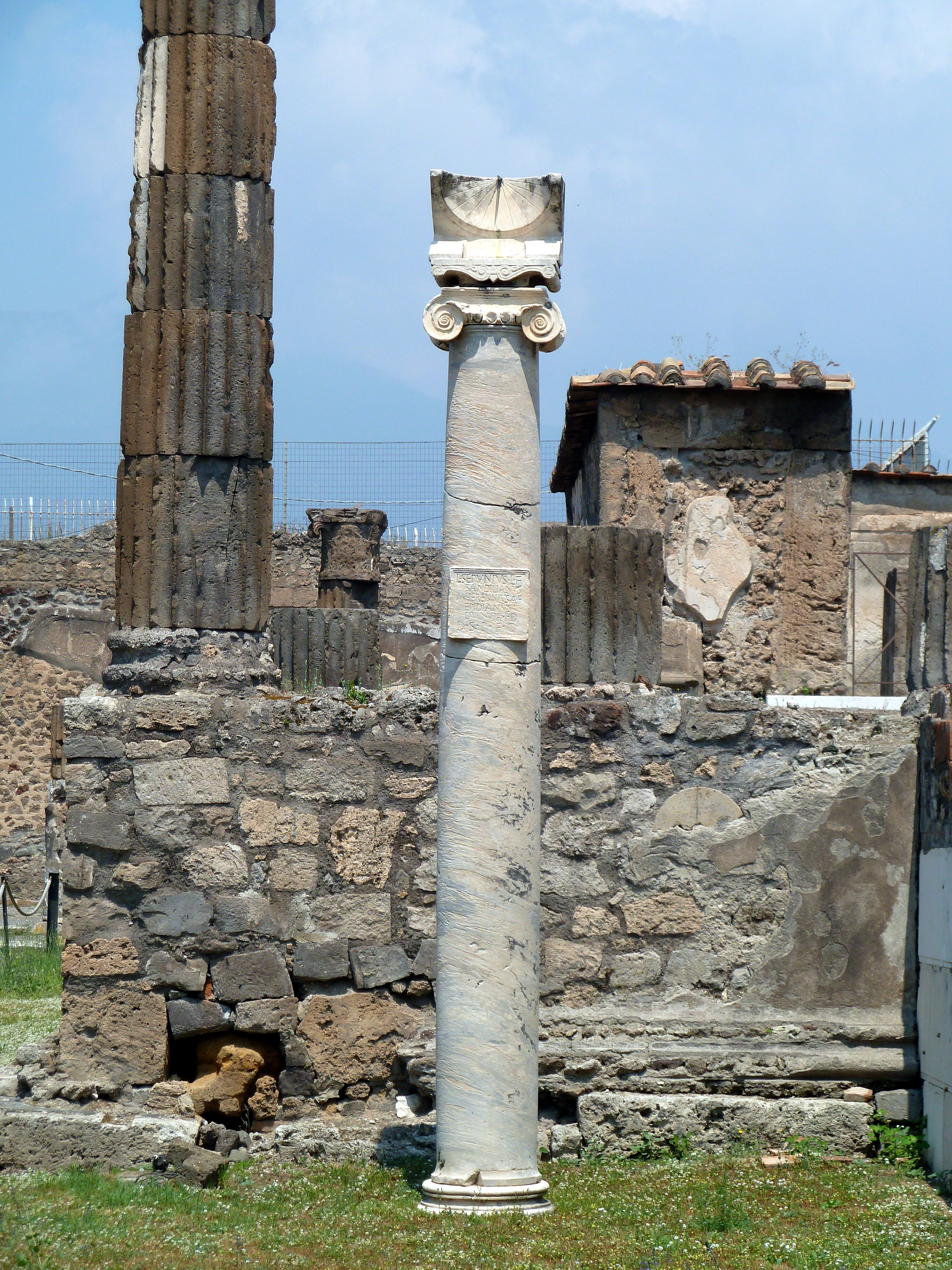
Dedication of a sundial at the Temple of Apollo

In the side of the perimeter wall of the Temple of Apollo, facing onto the town's forum, a niche is extracted containing the mensa ponderaria; the table with the town's official measures, to guarantee the citizen against fraudulent shopkeepers and merchandise.

== Excavations ==
Excavation of the temple first began in February 1817; it was mistakenly identified as the Temple of Venus, and then as the Temple of Mercury when fragments of a marble statue and two bronze arms positioned to fire an arrow were recovered. The fragments belong to the temple's deities – one representing Apollo, the other a bust of Diana – both of which would have been facing the columns of the portico. They are in display in the National Archeological Museum in Naples, though copies of two of them have been placed where the originals were found.

The elegant Doric architrave of metopes and triglyphs resting on the columns was transformed into a continuous frieze with griffins, festoons and foliage. Today, the remains of the temple front appear as they originally did, since almost all of this transformation in plaster has disappeared.

== See also ==
- List of Ancient Roman temples

== Bibliography ==
- Zanker, Paul. 1998. Pompeii: public and private life.
- Beard, Mary. 2008. The Fires of Vesuvius: Pompeii Lost and Found
- Boschi, Federica; Rescigno, Carlo (2021). “The sanctuary of Apollo in Pompeii: new geophysical and archaeological investigations.” GROM Documenting Archeology.
- Cooley, Alison E.; Cooley, M. G. L.. 2014. Pompeii and Herculaneum: A Sourcebook.
- Van Andringa, William. "Statues in the Temples of Pompeii." Historical and Religious Memory in the Ancient World(2012): 83.
