= Roman temple of Vic =

Coordinates: 41°55′45.10″N 2°15′24.36″E

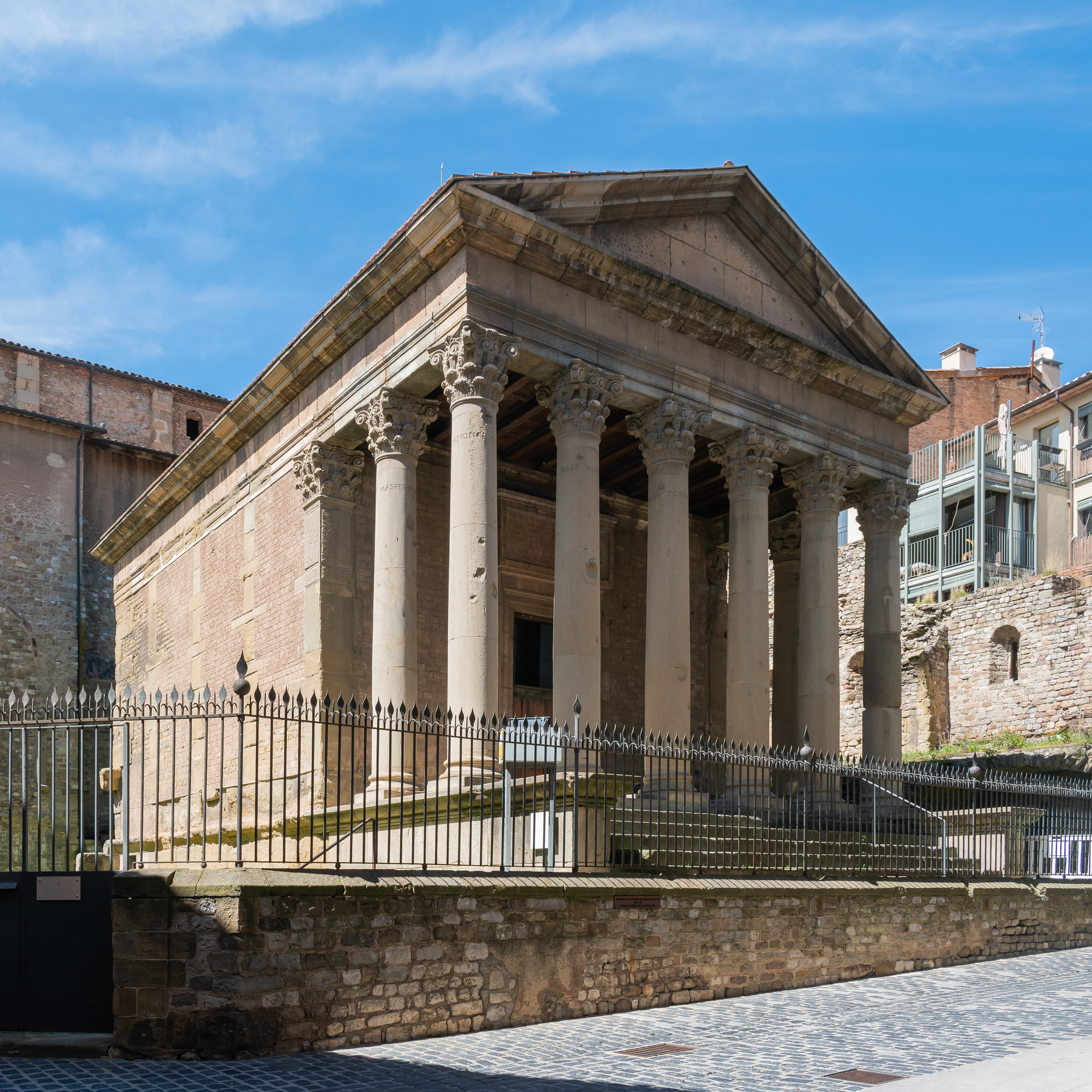
View of the Roman temple of Vic, Spain

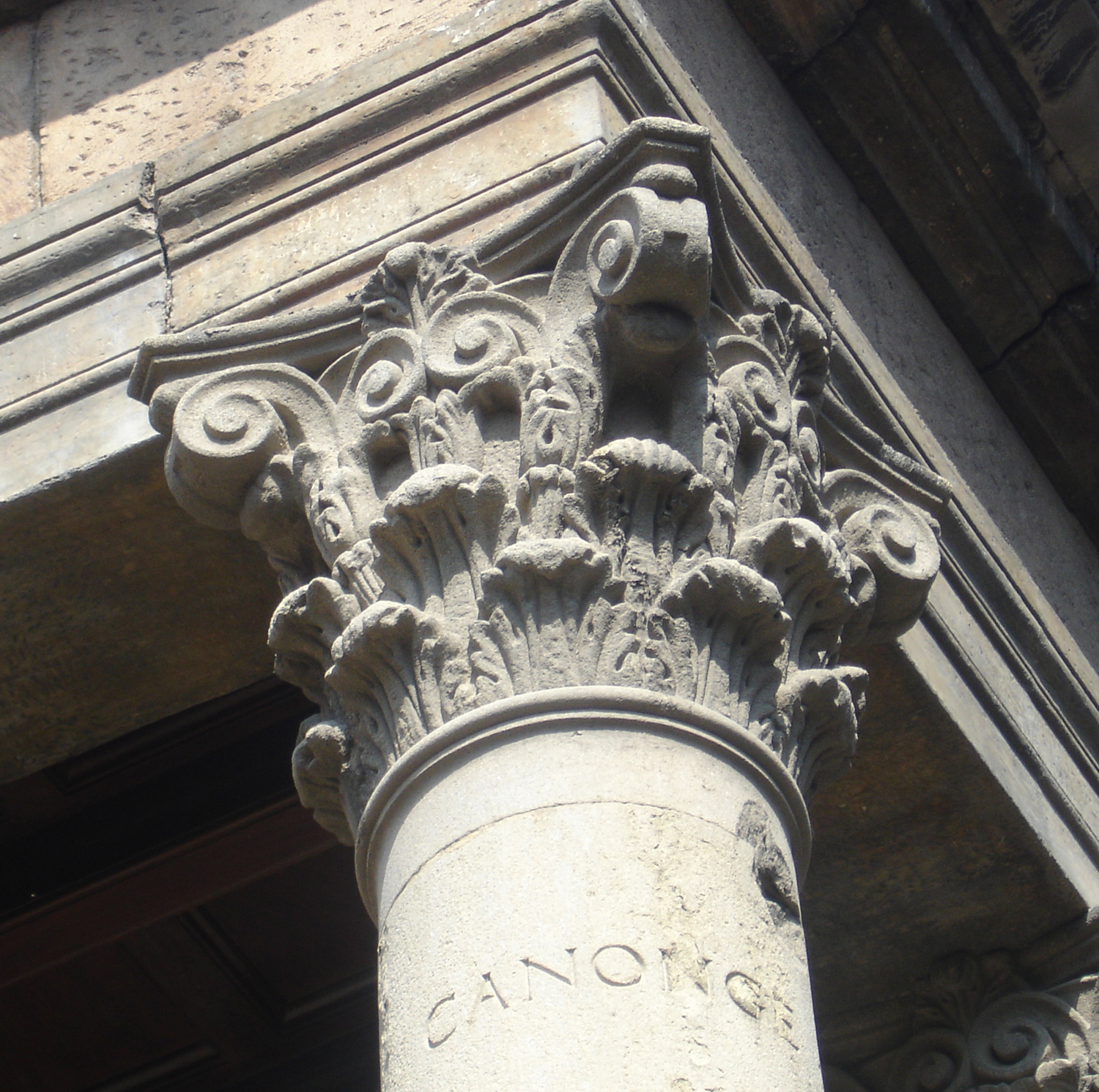
Corinthian capital.

The Roman temple of Vic is an ancient Roman temple located in the uptown area of Vic (Street Pare Xifrer), in the heart of Osona, Catalonia (Spain).

== History ==
The building dates from the early 2nd century, the golden age of the Roman Empire. Temples were a basic part of every Roman city, yet the location of this one was unknown until the late date of 1882. If it had still been in use by the 4th-century, the temple would have been closed during the persecution of pagans under the Christian emperors. In the 11th century, the temple was literally covered by the structure of the Castle of els Montcada, which later became the residence of the Veguers and finally, the prison of Vic. It was not until 1882, during the demolition of the old castle, that the workers spotted the Roman temple in very good condition. However the portico is a reconstruction made following the discovery of the columns and capitals.

== Architecture ==
Despite the many uses it saw, the condition of the temple is enough to let us imagine how it would have been originally. The columned portico towers above the podium, which is accessed via a front staircase, is in part reproduced copying the original elements found during its reconstruction. The columns are smooth, with the Corinthian capitals and entablature crowning the cella. Above the lintel of the temple is an inscription to commemorate the restoration of the temple.

== See also ==
- List of Ancient Roman temples
