= Valetudo temple =

Ancient Roman temple in Glanum, France

Valetudo temple in Saint-Rémy-de-Provence
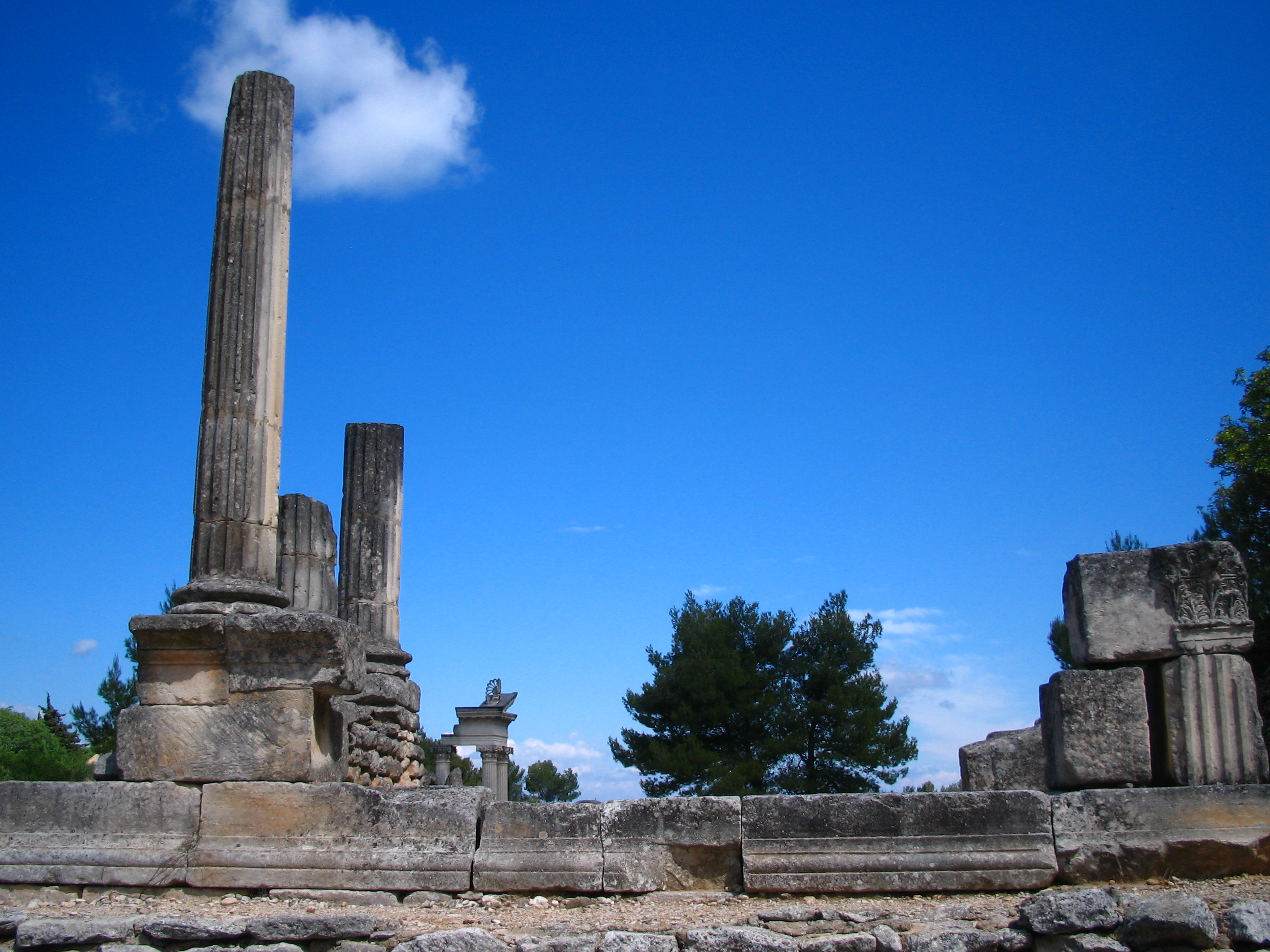
- The ruins of the temple, dating to about 39 BC.
- Interactive map of Valetudo temple in Saint-Rémy-de-Provence
- Location: Saint-Rémy-de-Provence; France
- Coordinates: 43°46′21.2″N 4°49′59.4″E
- Type: A small tetrastyle, Corinthian temple
- Excavations: 1921, 1982

The Temple of Valetudo at Glanum in Saint-Rémy-de-Provence, France is a small Roman tetrastyle Corinthian temple. It was dedicated to Valetudo, the Roman goddess of health. The temple is situated in the Valley of the Sacred Spring, within the Southern sector of the archaeological site of Glanum.

== History and structure ==
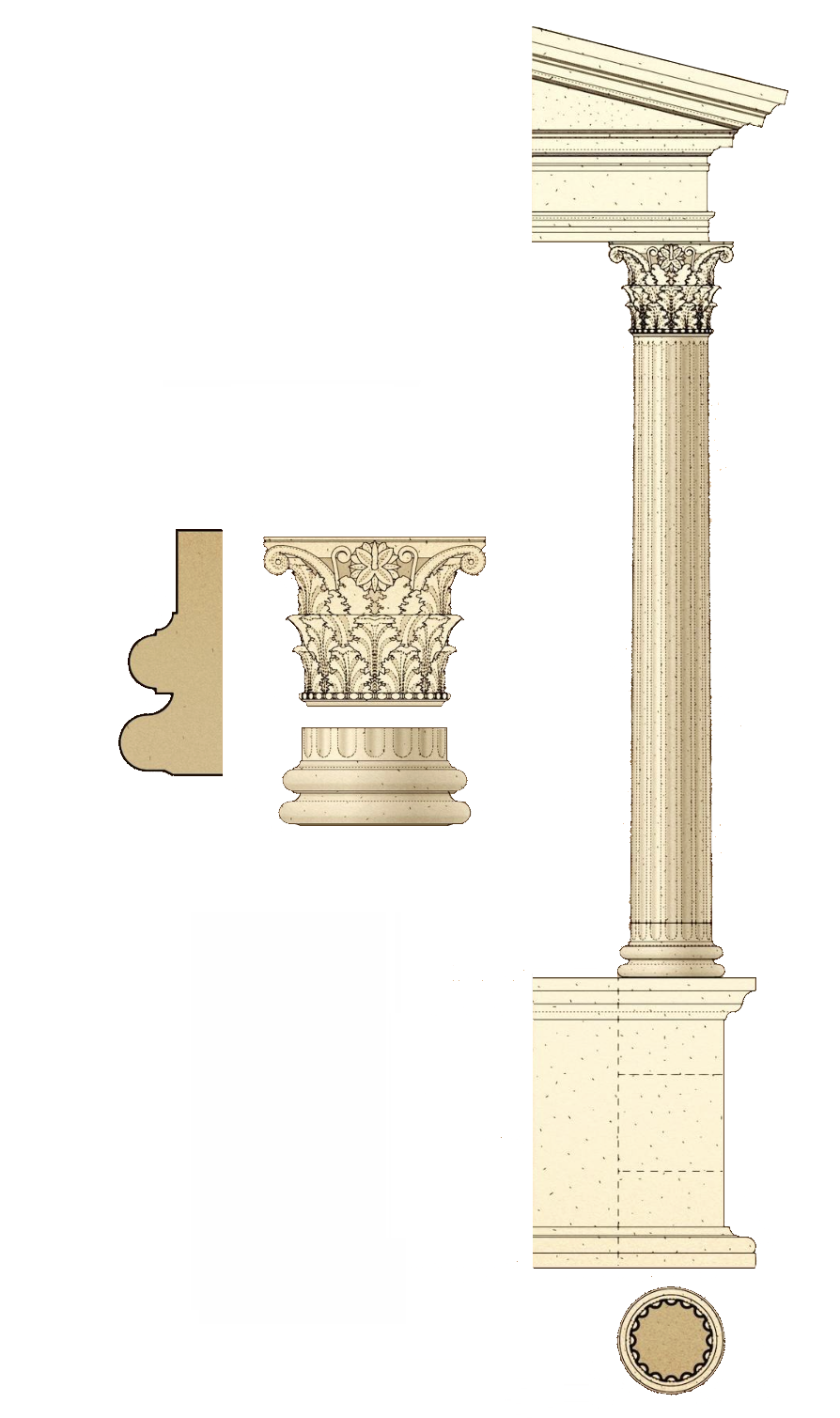
Architectural reconstruction of the Temple of Valetudo, illustrating its Corinthian order and structural elements.

An inscription indicates that the temple was built by the Roman general Marcus Vipsanius Agrippa. The dating of the temple is usually placed around the time of Agrippa's first voyage to Gaul in 39 BC. The temple was rebuilt into the modern form.

Excavations and archaeological recordings have found many architectural fragments from the temple, such as cornices, fluted pilasters, column drums, and Corinthian capitals. While most of the temple is missing, including most of the superstructure, what remains of the temple suggests that it once had a formal podium and used the Corinthian order, with simple rustic sculptural embellishment, seen in many Roman provincial temples of the late 1st century BC. Photogrammetric documentation has captured architrave fragments with an engraved dedication to Agrippa, as well as ornamental elements such as acrotères and sculptural busts from the structure's upper zones.

The temple is located above the sacred spring associated with Glanis, which is accessed by a set of stone steps. Archaeologists believe that a smaller temple dedicated to the indigenous Celtic water god Glanis was originally on the same spot, before it was dismantled to make way for the construction of the Temple of Valetudo.

When building Valetudo's temple here, the Romans blended the local healing cult with their cult of the goddess of health, reinterpreting the mythology associated with the spring and ascribing the healing powers of Glanis to Valetudo.

== Destruction, Abandonment, and Excavation ==
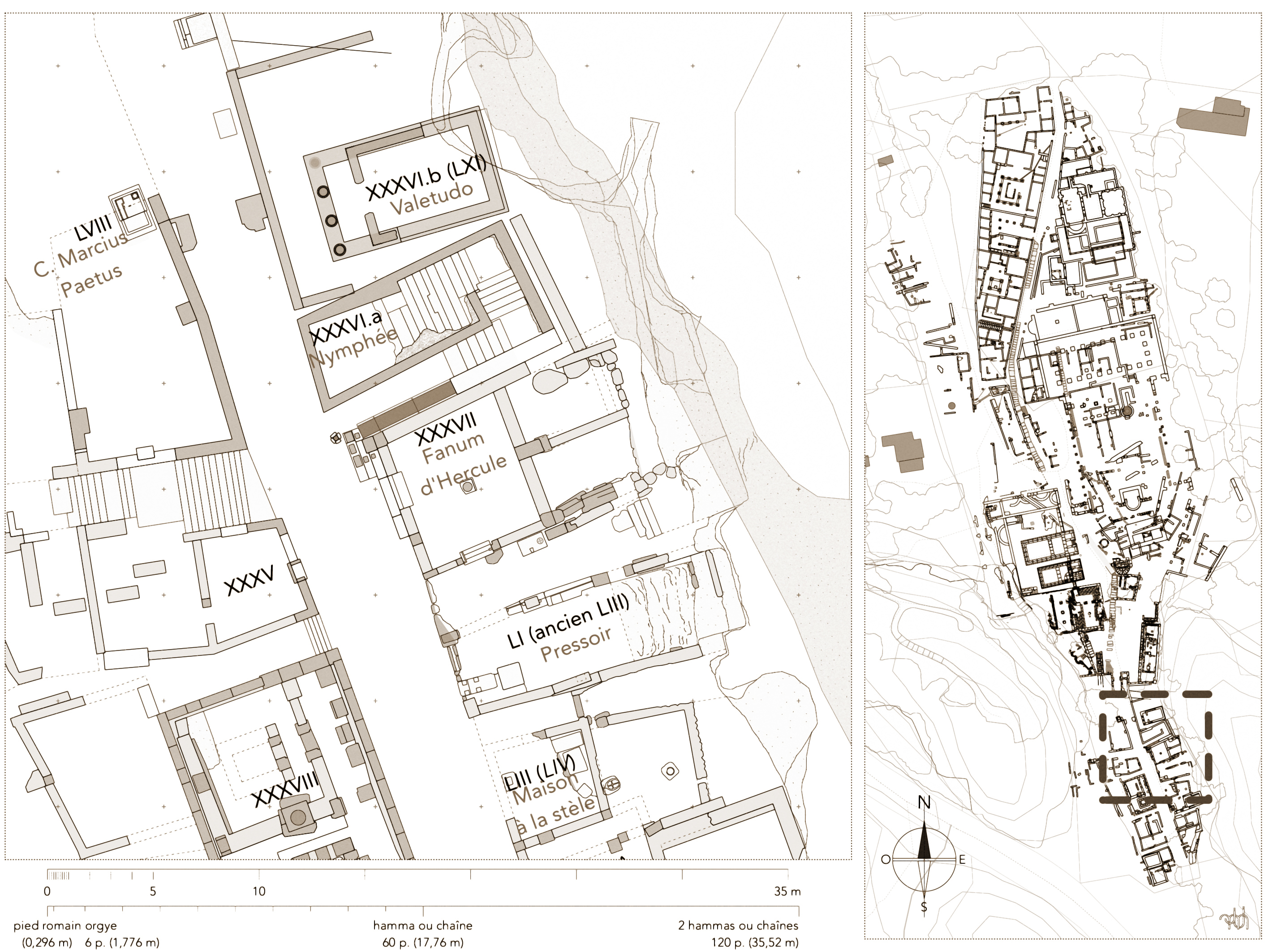
Map of Southern sector of Glanum, showing the temple of Valetudo (monument XXXVI.b).

The temple didn't survive from antiquity to the present intact. In 260 AD, Glanum was abandoned after being sacked by Germanic tribes. The temple then fell into ruin, and locals quarried its stone to build the town of Saint-Rémy. The site and temple were then buried under 8 metres of sediment due to the Roman drainage system blocking and causing repeated flooding. As a result, the temple was completely buried and in ruins. In 1921, archaeological excavation of the site began.

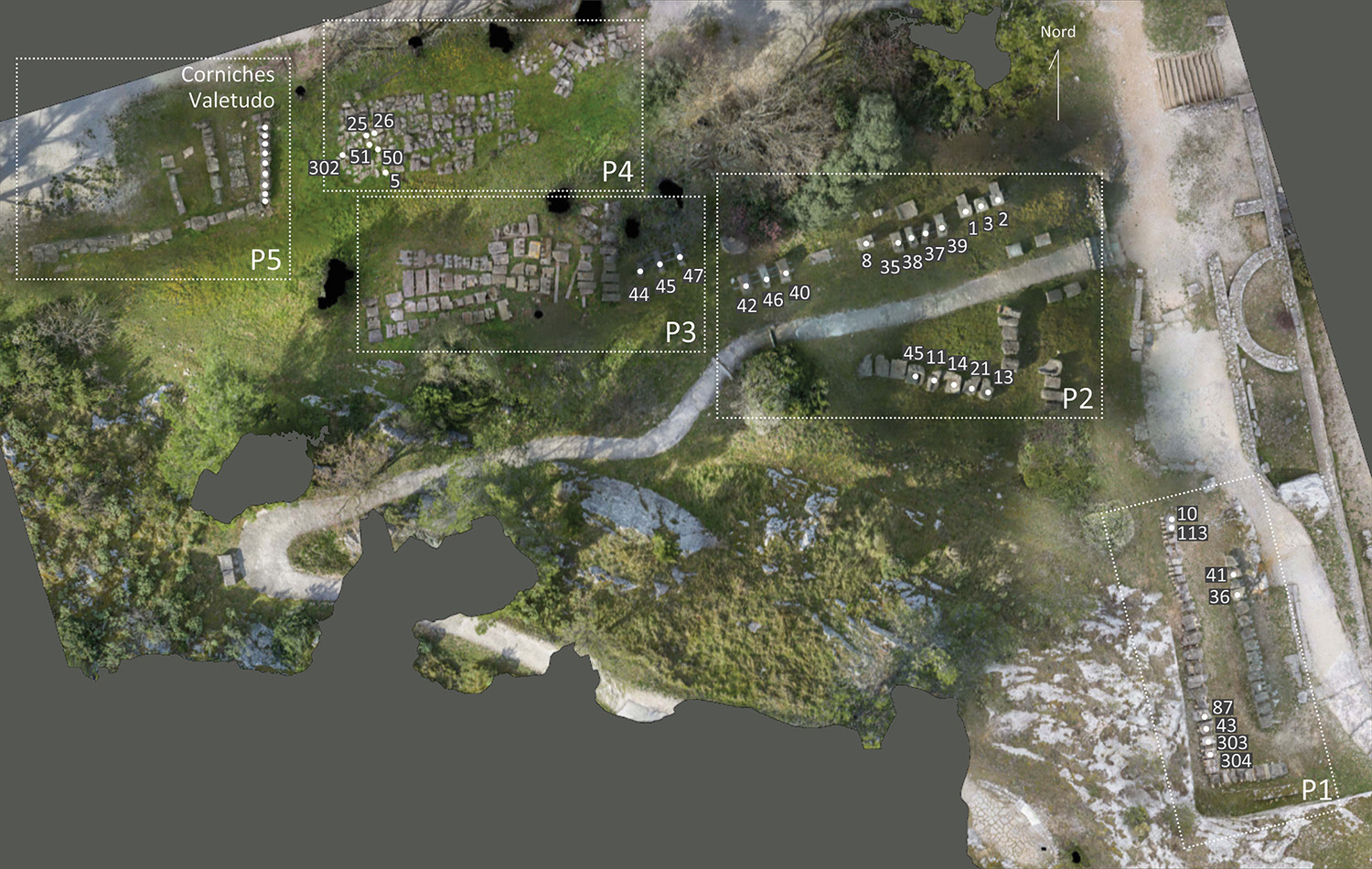
Map made from photos and CAD showing area of Valetudo cornice pieces.

During the excavation of the temple. Many parts were moved and stored. These pieces are either incorporated into the onsite reconstruction, stored elsewhere onsite, displayed in the local museum, or in archaeological storage. Below will be a list of fragments and where they are.

- Anta Capital (Pilaster Capital). Incorporated into the onsite reconstruction.
- Fluted Pilasters (Two fluted pilaster shafts). Incorporated into the onsite reconstruction.
- Cornice Blocks (12 Blocks). stored elsewhere onsite, (see image to the left).
- Female Statue (2 Fragments). displayed at the Hôtel de Sade museum in Saint-Rémy.
- Altar of Valetudo. displayed at the Hôtel de Sade museum in Saint-Rémy.
- Female Bust Ridge Acroterion from the roof apex. displayed at the Hôtel de Sade museum in Saint-Rémy.
- Column Bases (3 of the original 4). Incorporated into the onsite reconstruction.
- Column drums (3 partially stacked shafts). Incorporated into the onsite reconstruction.
- Architrave Fragments (2 with Agrippa Inscription) Incorporated into the onsite reconstruction.
- Corinthian Capital with Astragal moulding. off-site storage facility, not on display.
- Moulded podium blocks, Incorporated into the onsite reconstruction.

== Gallery ==
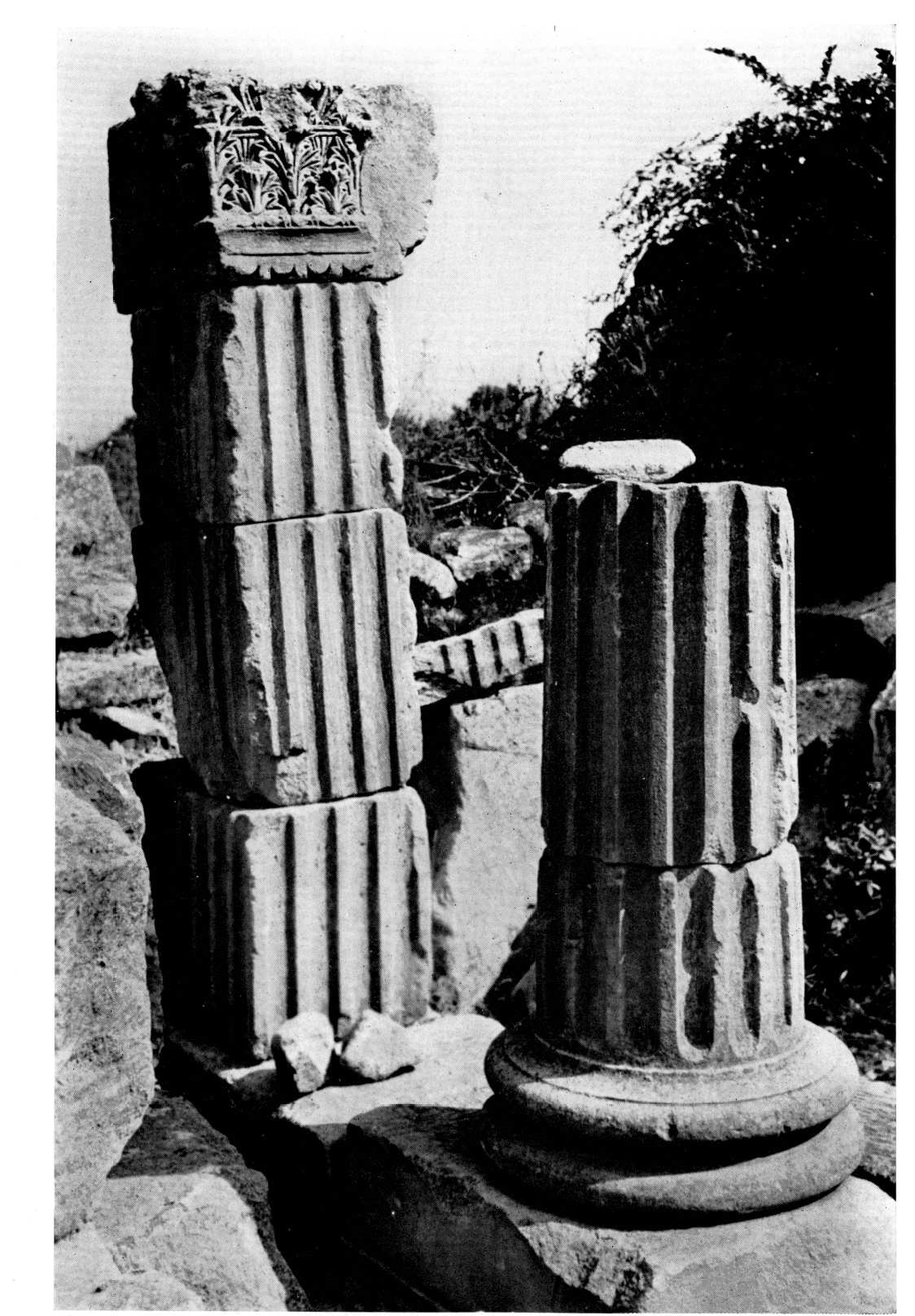
view of Valetudo temple's column base and Pilaster.

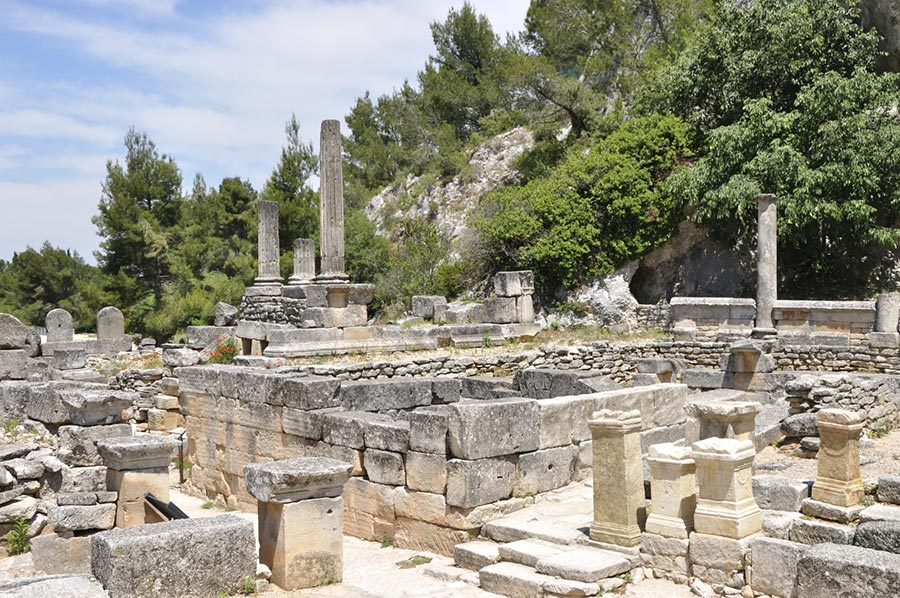
Valetudo temple next to the healing spring of Glanis

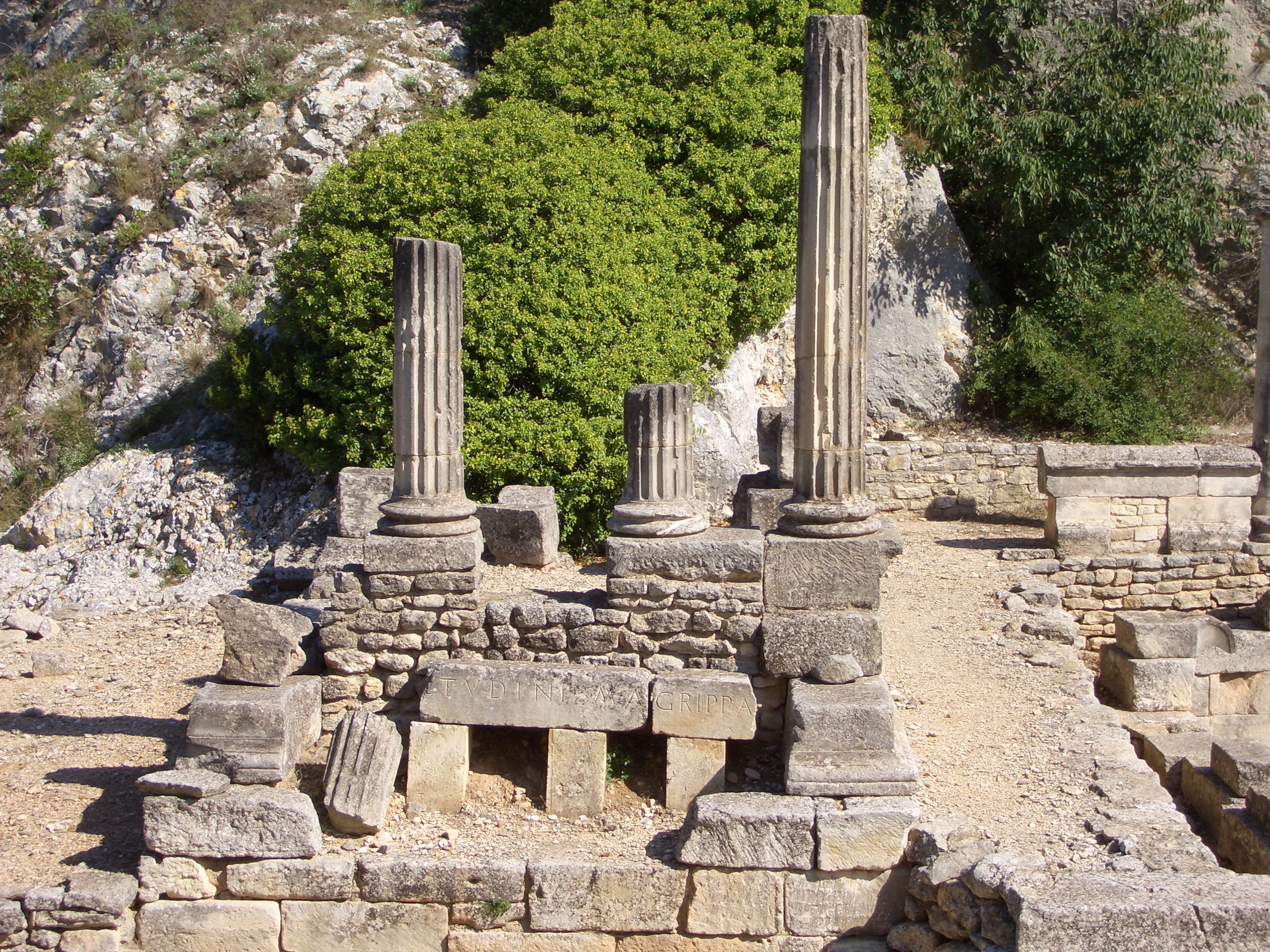
Front view of the temple

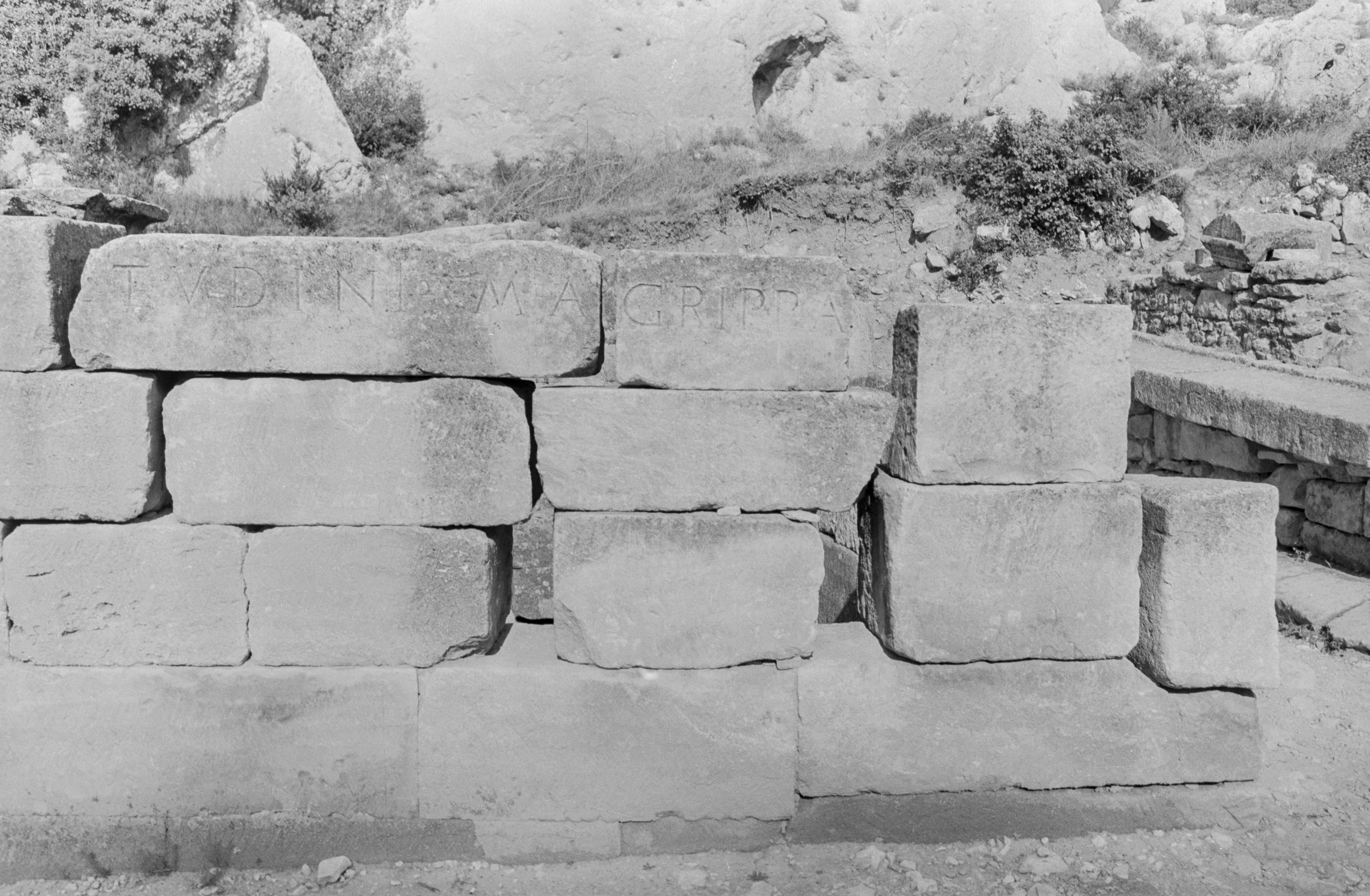
Engraving of Agrippa as seen in the 1960s from Valetudo temple.
