= Mausoleum of Glanum =

Mausoleum located in Bouches-du-Rhône, in France

- Mausolée de Glanum
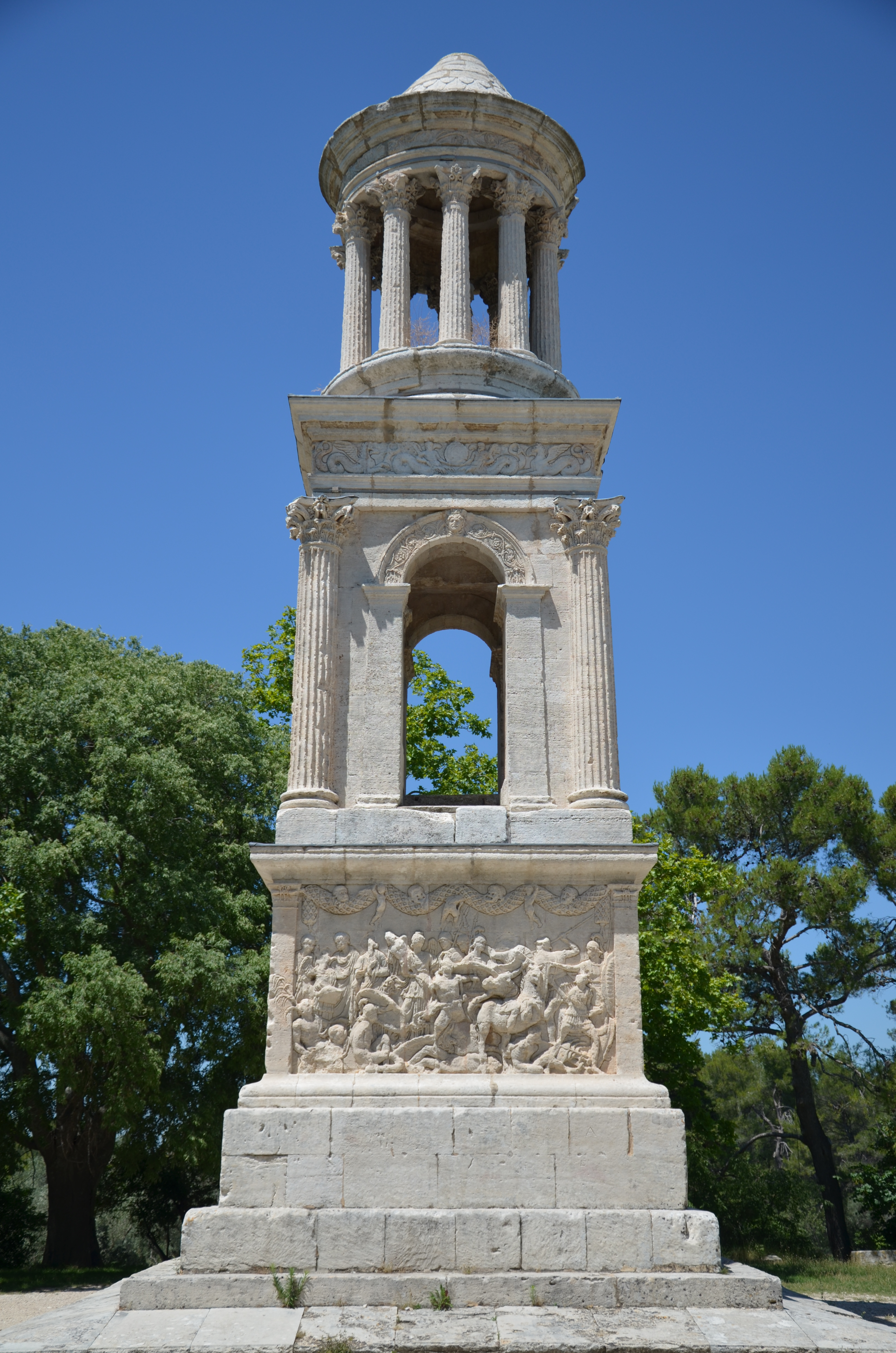
- The exceptionally preserved Mausoleum of Glanum in Saint-Rémy-de-Provence
- Interactive map of the Mausoleum of Glanum area
- Former names: Mausoleum of the Julii, Cenotaph of the Julii, "Les Antiques"

General information
- Type: Mausoleum / Cenotaph
- Architectural style: Gallo-Roman
- Location: Saint-Rémy-de-Provence, Bouches-du-Rhône, France; Glanum, Gallia Narbonensis, Avenue Vincent Van Gogh, 13210 Saint-Rémy-de-Provence, France
- Current tenants: None (protected archaeological monument / tourist attraction)
- Construction started: c. 40 BC
- Completed: c. 30–20 BC
- Client: Sextus, Lucius, and Marcus Julius (sons of Gaius)
- Owner: Government of France (administered by the Centre des monuments nationaux)

Height
- Height: 18 m (59 ft)

Technical details
- Structural system: Three-tiered limestone masonry tower (rectangular relief base, quadrifrons arch, and a round monopteros temple)
- Floor count: 3 levels (non-functional stacked architectural stages)

Design and construction
- Architect: Unknown
- Awards: French Monument historique (classified in the 1840 List)

The Mausoleum of Glanum is a Gallo-Roman monument erected by either 40 BC during the late Roman Republic, or between 30 and 20 BC during the transition from Republic to Empire, located south of Saint-Rémy-de-Provence, France. It stands outside the pomerium of the city of Glanum, which is now an archaeological site. It is in an exceptional state of conservation, one of the best preserved Roman structures in the world.

== Julii family ==
The monument bears a Latin inscription:

SEX(tus) M(arcus) L(ucius) IVLIEI C(aii) •F(ilii) PARENTIBVS SVEIS

It has been interpreted as a cenotaph erected in memory of a man of the Julii family, who would have been granted citizenship and his name by Julius Caesar for his service in the Roman army, following the conquest of Gaul. Henri Rolland, left to suggest that it was a mausoleum dedicated to the memory of Gaius Caesar and Lucius Caesar, grandsons of the emperor Augustus.

== Conservation ==
The mausoleum of Glanum is the subject of a classification as a historical monument by the List of 1840.

With the Arc de Saint-Rémy-de-Provence, a few meters away, it forms what is traditionally called the "Antiques of Saint-Rémy-de-Provence".
