= Glanis =

Gaulish water deity

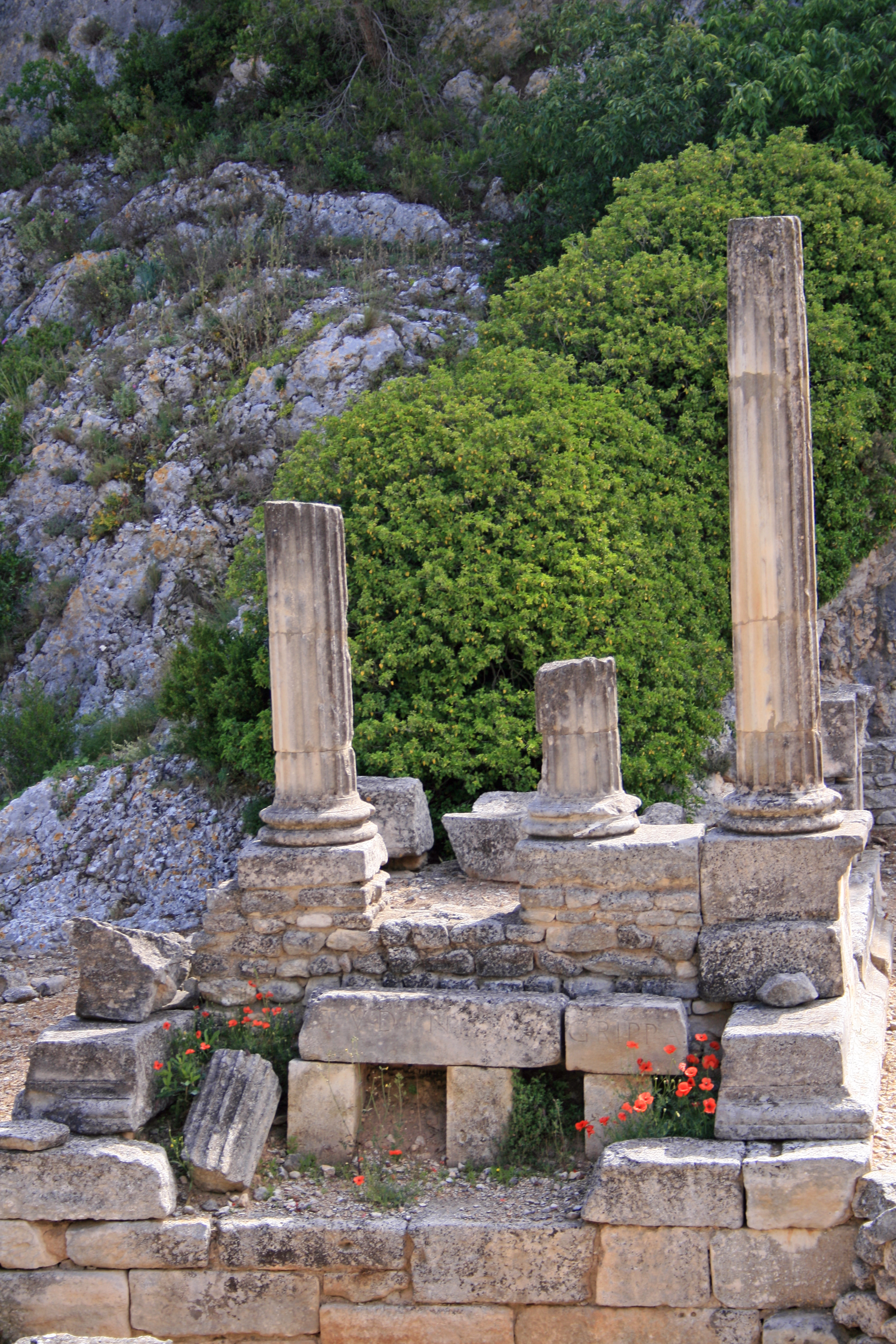
The Temple of Valetudo, about 39 BC, in Glanum.

Glanis was a Gaulish god associated with a healing spring at the town of Glanum in the Alpilles mountains of Provence in southern France. There are cisterns at the site of the springs where pilgrims may have bathed. Near one of them an altar to Glanis and the Glanicae was set up. The Glanicae were a triad of local mother goddesses associated with the healing springs.

The town, where a shrine to Glanis was erected in the 4th century BC, was itself named after the god. When it became a colony of the Roman Empire, the Romans followed their usual practice by absorbing Glanis into their pantheon in the form of Valetudo. The worship of Glanis/Valetudo ended with the rise of Christianity and the destruction of Glanum in 270 AD.

== See also ==
- Celtic mythology
