= List of municipalities of Lebanon =

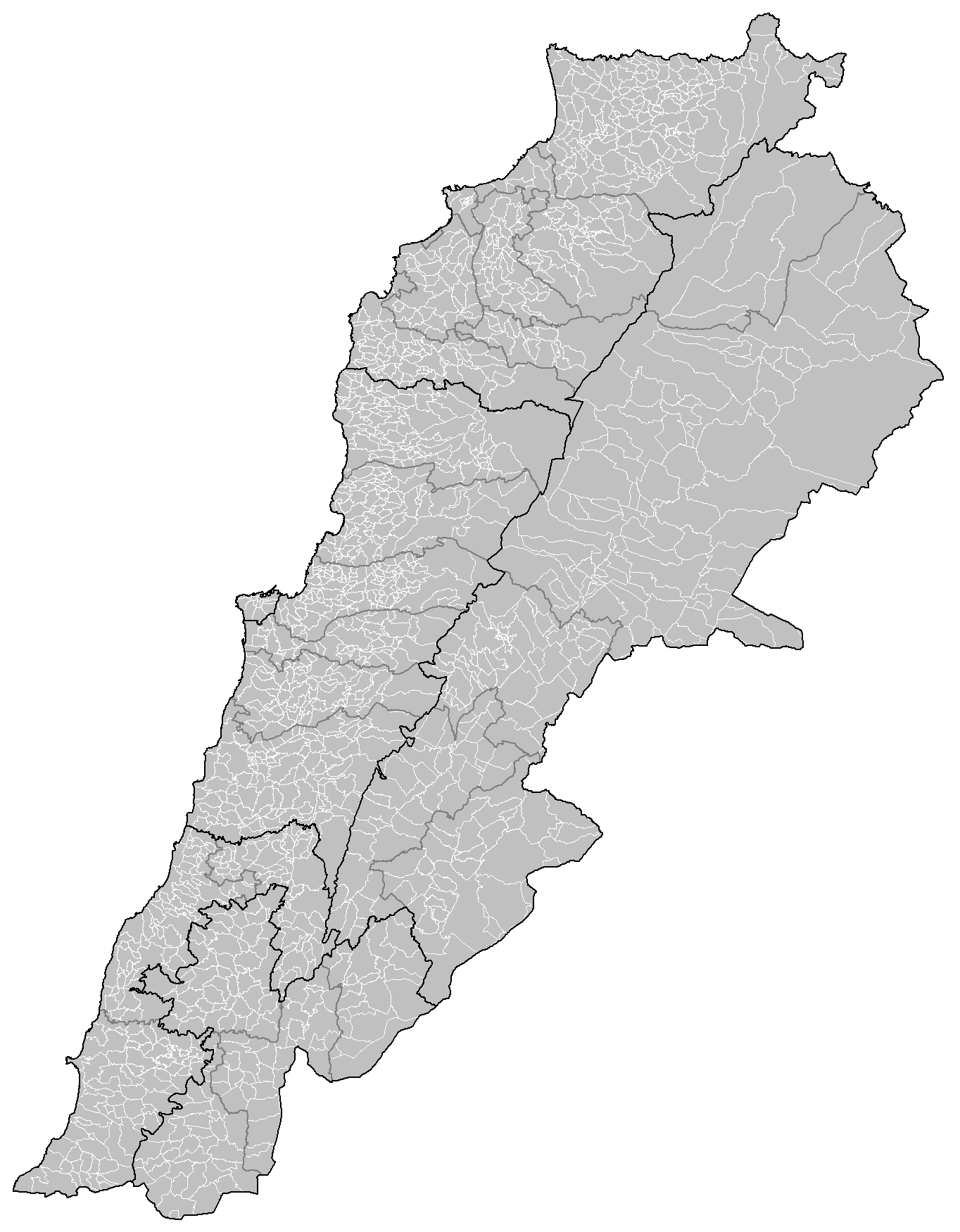
Municipalities of Lebanon

As of 2010, the 26 districts of Lebanon are subdivided into a total of 963 municipalities. The following is the list of the 963 municipalities of Lebanon as of 2010.

== Akkar Governorate ==
=== Akkar Governorate ===
Abboudieh
Aidamoun – Chikhalar
Akkar al-Atika
Andket
Ayat
Bayno – Kaboula
Bazbina
Bebnine
Beit Mallat
Berkayel
Bireh
Bkerezla
Bourj el Arab
Bourj
Bzal
Chadra
Charbila
Cheikh Mohammad
Cheikh Ayyash
Cheikh Taba
Daher el Laysine
Deir Jennine
Endkit
Fnaydek
Hakour
Halba
Hayssa
Hmayra
Jdeidet el Joumeh
Jdeidet el Kaiteh
Jebrayel
Karem Asfour – Beit Ghattas
Kfar Harra
Khreibet Ej Jindi
Kobayat
Kobbat el Chamrat
Koucha
Machta Hassan
Majdla
Mashha
Mazraat Baldeh
Mechmech
Minyara
Nfaiseh
Rahbeh
Saysouk
Sfainet el Dreib
Tal Maayan
Tel Abbas el Gharby
Telbireh
Zawarib
Zouk el Hosnyeh

== Baalbek-Hermel Governorate ==
=== Baalbeck District ===
Ain
Ainata
Al Khodr
Al Nabi Sheet
Baalbeck
Barka
Bechwat
Bednayel
Brital
Btadhi
Bodai
Chaat
Chmestar - Gharbi Baalbeck
Deir el Ahmar
Douris
Fakiha – Jdeydeh
Flaoui (Fleweh)
Hadath Baalbeck
Harbata
Hizzine
Hlabta
Hosh Barada
Hosh el Rafika
Hosh Snid
Hosh Tal Safiya
Iaat
Jabbouleh
Janta
Kfar Dane
Khraibeh
Ksarnaba
Labweh
Majdloun
Makneh
Nabi Othman
Qaa
Qarha
Ram – Jbenniyeh
Ras Baalbeck
Saayde
Seriine el Fawka
Seriine el Tahta
Shleefa
Talya
Taraya
Tayba
Temnin el Fawka
Temnin el Tahta
Wadi Faara
Yammouneh
Younine

=== Hermel District ===
Chawaghir el Fawka Wal Tahta
Hermel
Jouar el Hachich
Kasser – Fisane
Kouakh

== Beirut Governorate ==
=== Beirut District ===
Beirut

== Beqaa Governorate ==
=== Rachaya District ===
Ain Arab
Ain Ata
Ain Harcha
Akabeh
Ayha
Ayta el Fekhar
Bakifa
Bakka
Beit Lahya
Bireh
Daher el Ahmar
Deir el Achayer
Helwa
Hoch
Kawkaba
Kfar Danis
Kfarfouk
Kfarmechki
Kherbet Rouha
Majdel Balhiss
Mdoukha
Mhaydseh
Rachaya
Rafid
Tannoura, Lebanon
Yanta

=== Western Bekaa District ===
Ain el Tineh
Ain Zebdeh
Ammik
Ana
Aytanit
Baaloul
Bab Mareh
Ghaza
Jeb Jennine
Kamed el Laouz
Karaoun
Kefraya
Kelya
Kherbet Kanafar
Lala
Lebbaya
Machghara
Manara
Mansoura
Marej
Meidoun
Saghbine
Sohmor
Souairy
Sultan Yaakoub
Yehmor

=== Zahle District ===
Ablah
Ain Kfarzabad
Ali el Nahri
Bar Elias
Bouarej
Chtaura
Deir el Ghazal
Ferzol
Hay el Fikany
Hezerta
Hoch Moussa – Anjar
Jdita
Kaah el Rim
Kab Elias – Wadi el Deloum
Kfarzabad
Kousaya
Majdel Anjar
Massa
Mekssi
Mrayjat
Nabi Ayla
Niha Bekaa
Rhit
Riyak – Hoch Hala
Saadnayel
Taalabaya
Taanayel
Terbol
Zahlé – Maalaka

== Keserwan-Jbeil Governorate ==
=== Byblos District ===
Afqa
Ain el-Ghouaybeh
Aqoura
Almat – Souaneh
Amsheet
Kfar Baal
Bechtlida – Fidar
Bejjeh
Berbara
Blat
Byblos
Eddeh
Ehmej
Fatreh
Halat
Hjoula
Hosrayel
Hsoun
Jaj
Laqlouq
Lassa
Lehfed
Mayfouk - Qattara
Mazraat es-Siyad
Mechmech
Mejdel
Mghayreh
Mounsef
Nahr Ibrahim
Qartaba
Ras Osta
Tartej
Yanouh

=== Keserwan District ===
Achkout
Ain el Rihaneh
Aintoura
Ajaltoun
Akaybeh
Aramoun
Azra & Ozor
Ballouneh
Batha
Bekaatat Kenaan
Bekaatat Achkout
Bouar
Chahtoul & Jouret Mehad
Chnaniir
Daraya
Darooun Harissa
Dlebta
Faraya
Fatqa
Feytroun
Ghazir
Ghbaleh
Ghedrass
Ghosta
Ghyneh
Hiyata
Hosein
Hrajel
Jdeideh, Keserouan – Harharaya – Kattine
Jeita
Jounieh
Jouret Termos
Kfardebiane
Kfartay
Kfour
Kleiat
Maaysra
Mayrouba
Raachine
Rayfoun
Safra
Shayle
Tabarja – Adma – Dafne – Kfaryassine
Wata el Jawz
Yahchouch
Zaaytre
Zeytoun
Zouk Mikael
Zouk Mosbeh

== Mount Lebanon Governorate ==
=== Aley District ===
Abey – Ain Drafil
Aghmid
Ain Dara
Ain el Remmaneh
Ain el Saydeh
Ain Jedideh
Ain Ksour
Aïn Onoub
Ainab
Aley
Aramoun
Baawerta
Badghan
Bassatine
Bayssour
Bchamoun
Bdadoun
Bennay
Bhamdoun el Balda
Bhamdoun el Mhatta
Bkhechtey
Bleibel
Bmakkine
Bmahray
Bsouss
Btalloun
Btater
Chanay
Charoun
Chartoun
Chemlan
Choueifat
Deir Koubel
Dfoun
Eitat
Houmal
Kehaleh
Keyfoun
Kfaraamey
Kfar Matta
Kommatyeh
Majdelbaana
Mansourieh, Aley – Ain el Marej
Mecherfeh
Mejdlaya, Aley
Ramlieh
Ras el jabal
Rechmaya
Rejmeh
Remhala
Rouaysset el Neeman
Saoufar
Souk el Ghareb
Taazanieh

=== Baabda District ===
Abadiyeh
Araya
Arbaniyeh – Dlaybeh
Arsoun
Baabda
Baalchmay
Betchay – Al Mardacha
Bmaryam
Bourj el-Barajneh
Bsaba, Baabda
Btekhney
Bzebdine
Chbeniyeh
Chiyah
Chouit
Deir el Haref
Falougha
Furn el Chebbak – Ain el Remmaneh – Tehwitat el Nahr
Ghbeireh
Hadath
Hammana
Haret el Sett
Haret Hreik
Hasbaya, Baabda
Hazmieh
Jouar al Hoz
Jouret Arsoun
Kfarchima
Kfarselwan
Khraybe
Knayseh
Kobeih
Kornayel
Kortada
Krayeh
Ksaybeh
Mreijeh – Tehwitat el Ghadir – Al Laylakeh
Ras el Haref
Ras el Metn
Rouayset el Ballout
Salima
Tarchich
Wadi Chahrour

=== Chouf District ===
Ain Kani
Ain Wzein
Ain Zhalta
Ainbal
Amatour
Ammik
Anout
Atrine
Baakline
Baasir
Baatharan
Barja
Barouk – Freydiss
Bater
Batloun
Bchetfine
Beiteddine
Berjein & Mreyjat
Bireh
Botme
Bsaba El Chouf
Chehim
Daher el Mghara
Dalhoun
Damour
Daraya
Debbieh
Deir Dourit
Deir el Kamar
Deir Kouche
Dmit
Fouara
Gharife
Haret Jandal
Hasrout
Jadra
Jahlieh
Jbeih
Jdeidet el Chouf
Jiyeh
Joun
Kahlounie
Ketermaya
Kfarfakoud
Kfarhim
Kfarkatra
Kfarnabrakh
Kfarniss
Khraibeh
Knayse
Maasser Beiteddine
Maasser el Chouf
Majdel Meouch
Mazboud
Mazraat el Chouf
Mazraat el Daher
Mechref
Mghayrie
Mokhtara
Mristeh
Naameh
Niha Chouf
Rmayle
Sebline
Semkanieh
Serjbeil
Wadi Sit
Warhanieh
Werdanieh
Zaarourieh

=== Matn District ===
Ain el Safssaf – Mar Michael Bnabil
Ain Saade – Beit Mery
Aintoura, Metn
Antelias – Naccache
Ayroun
Baabdat
Baskinta
Beit Chabab – Chaouiye & Konaytra
Beit el Chaar & Hadirat
Biakout
Bikfaya – Mhaydseh
Bourj Hammoud
Broummana
Bsalim – Mezher – Majzoub
Bteghrine
Choueir – Ain el Sendianeh
Dahr el Sawan
Dbayeh – Zouk al Khrab – Haret al Ballaneh – Aoukar
Dekwaneh – Marroukouz – Daher al Hosein
Dik El Mehdi
Douar
Fanar
Ghabeh
Ghabet Bologna – Wata el Mrouj
Jal el Dib – Bkenneya
Jdeideh – Bouchrieh – Sadd Bouchrieh
Kaakour
Kfarakab
Kfertay
Khenchara & Jouar
Konnabat Broummana
Kornet Chehwan – Ain Aar – Beit El Kekko & Hbous
Majdel Tarchich
Mansourieh – Mkalles – Daychounieh
Mar Chaaya & Mzekke
Mar Moussa – Douar
Marjaba
Mazraat Yachouh
Mrouj
Mtein & Mchikha
Nabay
Ouyoun
Rabieh
Roumieh
Sakiyat al Mesek – Bhersaf
Sin el Fil
Zalka – Amaret Chalhoub
Zarooun
Zekrite

== Nabatieh Governorate ==
=== Bint Jbeil District ===
Ain Ebel
Aynata
Ayta el Chaeb
Ayta el Jabal
Aytaroun
Beit Lif
Beit Yahoun
Bint Jbeil
Burj Qalaouiyah
Braachit
Chakra wa Doubeih
Debel
Deir Antar
Froun
Ghandouriyeh
Hanine
Hariss
Haddatha
Jmeyjmeh
Kafra
Kalaway
Kawzah
Kfardounine
Khirbet Selm
Kounine
Maroun el Ras
Ramyah
Rchaf
Rmeich
Serbine
Sultanieh
Tibnin
Tiri
Yaroun
Yater

=== Hasbaya District ===
Ain Kanya
Chebaa
Chwayya
Fardiss
Hasbaya
Hbariyeh
Kawkaba
Kfarchouba
Kfarhamam
Kfeir
Khalwat
Mari
Marj el Zhour
Mimass
Rachaya el Fokhar

=== Marjeeyoun District ===
Adayseh
Adchit
Bani Hayann
Blatt
Blida
Debbine
Deir Mimass
Deir Syriane
Ebel el Saky
Houla
Jdeidet Marjeeyoun
Kabrikha
Kantara
Kfarkila
Khiam
Klayaa
Majdel Selem
Markaba
Mays el Jabal
Rab Thalathine
Sawaneh
Tallousseh
Taybeh
Wazzany

=== Nabatieh District ===
Adchit
Ain Kana
Ansar
Arabsalim
Arnoun
Breykaah
Charkiyeh
Choukine
Deir el Zahrani
Doueir
Ebba
Habbouch
Harouf
Houmin el Fawka
Houmin el Tahta
Jarjouh
Jbaah – Ain Bouswar
Jebchit
Kaakaiyet el Jisr
Kfarfila
Kfarremane
Kfarsir
Kfartebnit
Kfour
Kossaybeh
Mayfadoun
Nabatieh el Fawka
Nabatieh el Tahta
Namiriyeh
Roumine
Sarba
Siney
Sir el Gharbiyeh
Yehmor el Chekif
Zawtar el Charkiyeh
Zawtar el Gharbiyeh
Zebdine
Zefta

== North Lebanon Governorate ==
=== Batroun District ===
Ajdabra
Assia
Batroun
Bcheeleh
Bkesmaya
Chatine
Chebtine
Chekka
Douma
Eddeh
Hamat
Hardine – Beit Kassab
Hery
Ibrine
Kfarabida
Kfarhalda
Kfour el Arabi
Kobba
Ras Nahhache
Selaata
Tannourine
Zan

=== Becharre District ===
Abdine
Barhelyoun
Bazooun
Becharre
Bkaakafra
Bkerkacha
Hadath el Jebbeh
Hadchit
Hasroun
Kanat
Tourza

=== Koura District ===
Afsaddik
Ain Ekrine
Ajed Ibrine
Amioun
Anfeh
Barsa
Batroumine
Bdebba
Bishmizzine
Bednayel
Bkeftine
Bsarma
Bterram
Btouratij
Bziza
Dar Beechtar
Dar Chmezzine
Deddeh
Fih
Kaftoun
Kelhat
Kifraya
Kfarakka
Kfarhata
Kfarhazir
Kfarkahel
Kfarsaroun
Kosba
Mejdel – Zakzouk – Wata Fares
Metrite
Nakhleh
Rasmaska
Rechdebbine

=== Minieh-Denniye District ===
Asoun
Bakhoun
Beddawi – Wadi Nahleh
Beit el Fokss
Bekaasafrine
Bhannine & Artousa
Bkarsouna – Kattine
Deir Ammar
Deir Nbouh
Karm el Moher
Kfarchalane
Kfarhabou
Minyeh
Mrah Sraj
Nemrine & Bkaouza
Sfireh
Sir
Tarane

=== Tripoli District ===
Al-Qalamoun
Mina
Tripoli
Al-Baddawi

=== Zgharta District ===
Achache
Aintourine
Alma
Arabet Kozhaya
Arde
Arjess
Ayto
Basloukit
Bheyra
Bnachee
Daraya – Bechnine
Haret el Fouar
Iaal
Karem Saddeh
Kfard Lakouss
Kfaresghab – El Mareh
Kfarfou
Kfarhata
Kfaryachit – Besebhel
Kfarzayna
Korah Bach
Mazraat el Teffah
Mejdlaya
Mezyara – Haref – Hmayss – Sakhra
Miryata – Kadrieh
Rachiine
Raskifa
Sebhel
Serhel
Toula – Aslout
Zgharta – Ehden

== South Lebanon Governorate ==
=== Jezzine District ===
Aaray
Aitouleh
Aramta
Aychieh
Azour
Benweteh
Bkassine
Bteddine el Lekech
Haytoura
Homsiyeh
Jarmak
Jernaya
Jezzine – Ain Majdaleyn
Karkha
Kattine – Hidab
Kfarfalous
Kfarhouna
Kfarjarrah
Lebaa
Louaizeh
Machmouche
Maknounieh
Midane
Mjeydel
Mlikh
Rihane
Rimat – Chkadif
Roum
Sabbah
Saydoun
Sfaray
Snaya
Sojod
Wadi Jezzine
Zhalta

=== Sidon District ===
Abra
Adloun
Adousieh
Ain el Deleb
Ankoun
Bablieh
Barty
khourbat AL Dweir
Bayssarieh
Bkosta
Bnaafoul
Bramieh
Dareb el Sim
Erkay
Ghazieh
Ghessanieh
Haret Saida
Hlalyeh
Insariat
Irzay
Kaakaiyat el Snaoubar
Kawthariyet el Siyyad
Kfar Hatta
Kfar Melki
Khartoum
Khrayeb
Knarite
Krayeh
Loubieh
Maghdouche
Majdelyoun
Meemarieh
Merwanieh
Mieh Mieh
Najjarieh
Sidon
Saksakieh
Salhieh
Sarafand
Tafahta
Tanbourit
Zeita
Zrariyeh

=== Tyre District ===
Aaytit
Abbassieh
Ain Baal
Alma el Chaab
Arzoun
Baflay
Barich
Batoulieh
Bayyad
Bazourieh
Bedyass
Borj el Chamali
Borj Rahal
Bourghlieh
Boustane
Chameh
Chehabie
Chehour
Chihine
Debaal
Deir Amess
Deir Kanoun – Ras el Ain
Deir Kanoun Naher
Derdghaya
Halloussieh
Hanawey
Henniye
Hmayri
Jbal el Botm
Jebbine
Jwaya
Kana
Kolayleh
Maarake
Maaroub
Mahroune
Majadel
Majdalzoun
Mansouri
Marwahine
Mazraat Mechref
Nakoura
Ramadiye
Rechknanay
Selaa
Siddikine
Srifa
Tayr Debba
Tayr Falsay
Tayr Harfa
Toura
Tyre
Yanouh
Yarine
Zebkine

== See also ==
- List of cities and towns in Lebanon
- Governorates of Lebanon
- Districts of Lebanon
- Subdivisions of Lebanon
