= Btermaz =

Village in the Miniyeh-Danniyeh District in the North Governorate of Lebanon

Btermaz بطرماز
- Interactive map of Btermaz
- Coordinates: 34°25′17″N 36°02′05″E
- Country: Lebanon
- Governorate: North Governorate
- Districts of Lebanon: Miniyeh-Danniyeh District

Area
  - Total: 10.21 km^{2} (3.94 sq mi)
- Elevation: 647 m (2,123 ft)
- Time zone: +2
  - Summer (DST): +3

Btermaz (Levantine Arabic: بطرماز, romanized: Bṭermāz) is a Sunni Muslim village, located in the Miniyeh-Danniyeh District, in the North Governorate of Lebanon. It had 1,767 eligible voters in the 2009 elections.

== History ==
In 1838, Eli Smith noted the village as Bturmaz, located in the Ed-Dunniyeh area.

== Demographics ==
In 2014, Muslims made up 98.19% of registered voters in Btermaz. 98.04% of the voters were Sunni Muslims.

== Bibliography ==
- Robinson, E.; Smith, E. (1841). Biblical Researches in Palestine, Mount Sinai and Arabia Petraea: A Journal of Travels in the year 1838. Vol. 3. Boston: Crocker & Brewster.
