= Bqaa Safrine =

Village in the Miniyeh-Danniyeh District in the North Governorate of Lebanon

Bqaa Safrine بقاع صفرين
- Location within Lebanon
- Coordinates: 34°22′32″N 36°01′25″E
- Country: Lebanon
- Governorate: North Governorate
- Districts of Lebanon: Miniyeh-Danniyeh District

Area
  - Total: 96.85 km^{2} (37.39 sq mi)
- Time zone: +2
  - Summer (DST): +3

Bqaa Safrine (Arabic: بقاع صفرين, romanized: Bqāʿa Ṣafrīn), also spelled Bekaasafrine, is a Sunni Muslim village, located in the Miniyeh-Danniyeh District, in the North Governorate of Lebanon. It had 2,750 eligible voters in the 2009 elections.

== History ==
In 1838, Eli Smith noted the village as Buka'a Sufrin located in the Ed-Dunniyeh area.

== Demographics ==
In 2014, Muslims made up 99.88% of registered voters in Bqaa Safrine. 99.85% of the voters were Sunni Muslims.

== Bibliography ==
- Robinson, E.; Smith, E. (1841). Biblical Researches in Palestine, Mount Sinai and Arabia Petraea: A Journal of Travels in the year 1838. Vol. 3. Boston: Crocker & Brewster.
