= Aassoun =

Village in the Miniyeh-Danniyeh District in the North Governorate of Lebanon

Aassoun عاصون
- Location within Lebanon
- Coordinates: 34°23′08″N 36°00′37″E
- Country: Lebanon
- Governorate: North Governorate
- Districts of Lebanon: Miniyeh-Danniyeh District

Area
  - Total: 3.81 km^{2} (1.47 sq mi)
- Time zone: +2
  - Summer (DST): +3

Aassoun (Arabic: عاصون, romanized: ʿĀṣṣūn) is a Lebanese village, located in the Miniyeh-Danniyeh District. It had 2,142 eligible voters in the 2009 elections, and the residents were mostly Sunni Muslim with a Greek Orthodox minority.

== History ==
In 1838, Eli Smith noted the village as 'Asum, located in the Ed-Dunniyeh area. The inhabitants were Sunni Muslim and Greek Orthodox Christians.

== Demographics ==
In 2014, Muslims made up 62.49% and Christians made up 37.38% of registered voters in Aassoun. 62.29% of the voters were Sunni Muslims and 35.14% were Greek Orthodox.

== Bibliography ==
- Robinson, E.; Smith, E. (1841). Biblical Researches in Palestine, Mount Sinai and Arabia Petraea: A Journal of Travels in the year 1838. Vol. 3. Boston: Crocker & Brewster.
