= Tarane =

Village in the Miniyeh-Danniyeh District in the North Governorate of Lebanon

Tarane طاران
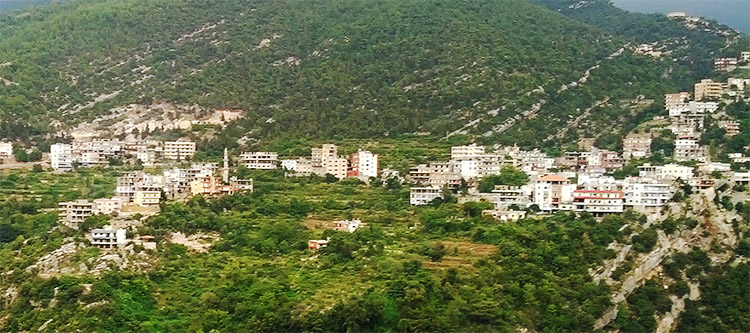
- Tarane, 2012

- Location within Lebanon
- Coordinates: 34°25′35″N 35°59′41″E
- Country: Lebanon
- Governorate: North Governorate
- Districts of Lebanon: Miniyeh-Danniyeh District

Area
  - Total: 2.04 km^{2} (0.79 sq mi)
- Time zone: +2
  - Summer (DST): +3

Tarane (Arabic: طاران, romanized: Ṭārān) is a village located in the Miniyeh-Danniyeh District, in the North Governorate of Lebanon. It had 1,593 eligible voters in the 2009 elections.

== History ==
In 1838, Eli Smith noted the village as Taran, located in the Ed-Dunniyeh area.

== Demographics ==
In 2014, Muslims made up 99.84% of registered voters in Tarane. 99.62% of the voters were Sunni Muslims.

== Bibliography ==
- Robinson, E.; Smith, E. (1841). Biblical Researches in Palestine, Mount Sinai and Arabia Petraea: A Journal of Travels in the year 1838. Vol. 3. Boston: Crocker & Brewster.
