= Flaoui =

Flaoui فلاوي Fleywe
- Village
- Interactive map of Flaoui
- Country: Lebanon
- Governorate: Baalbek-Hermel
- District: Baalbek
- Elevation: 4,442 ft (1,354 m)

Flaoui
- Fleywe
- Location within Lebanon
- 34.0833°N 36.0500°E
- Periods: Heavy Neolithic, Neolithic
- Cultures: Qaraoun culture
- Location: 17 kilometres (11 mi) northwest of Baalbek, Lebanon

Site notes
- Excavation dates: 1965
- Archaeologists: Frank Skeels, Lorraine Copeland
- Public access: Yes

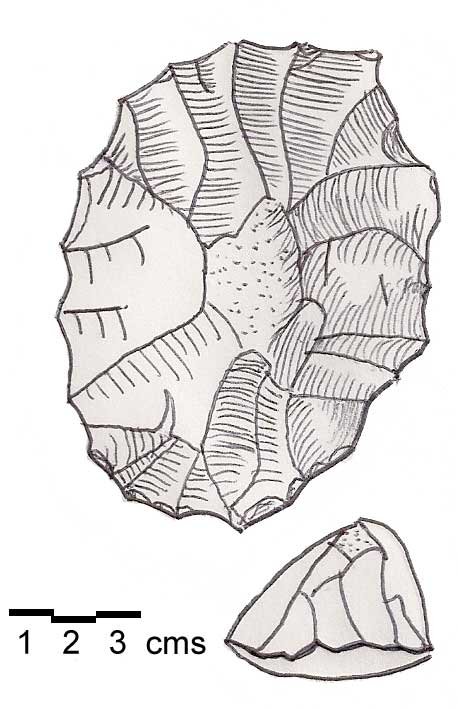
Massive steep-scraper on a split cobble or flake with direct retouch all around and cortex on the crest. Found at Mtaileb I.

Flaoui or Fleywe or Flaoueh (Arabic: فلاوي) is a small village located 17 kilometres (11 mi) northwest of Baalbek, Lebanon in Baalbek District, Baalbek-Hermel Governorate, Lebanon. It is located near the north–south road that runs from Bodai to Chlifa.

A Heavy Neolithic archaeological site of the Qaraoun culture is located in the area on fielded slopes of a small valley facing the Beqaa Valley. It was discovered by Lorraine Copeland and Frank Skeels in 1965 with materials examined by Henri Fleisch. Worked tools were found made from abundant nodules of siliceous, grey-yellow limestone. The material suggested to be Heavy Neolithic consisted of massive, rough cores and flakes with another group being found that showed resemblance to an assemblage termed by Fleisch the Micro-Mousterian. The site was under cultivation in 1966.

== Demographics ==
As of 2014, the town had 1,116 registered voters of whom 98.12% were Shia Muslims.
