= Bakhoun =

Village in the Miniyeh-Danniyeh District in the North Governorate of Lebanon

Bakhoun بخعون
- Location within Lebanon
- Coordinates: 34°24′35″N 36°00′54″E
- Country: Lebanon
- Governorate: North Governorate
- Districts of Lebanon: Miniyeh-Danniyeh District

Area
  - Total: 7.97 km^{2} (3.08 sq mi)
- Time zone: +2
  - Summer (DST): +3

Bakhoun (Arabic: بخعون, romanized: Bakhʿūn) is a Lebanese village, located in the Miniyeh-Danniyeh District. It had over 9,500 eligible voters in the 2025 elections, and the residents were mainly Sunni Muslim.

== History ==
In 1838, Eli Smith noted the village as Bukha'un, located in the Ed-Dunniyeh area.

== Demographics ==
In 2014, Muslims made up 99.66% of registered voters in Bakhoun. 99.38% of the voters were Sunni Muslims.

== Bibliography ==
- Robinson, E.; Smith, E. (1841). Biblical Researches in Palestine, Mount Sinai and Arabia Petraea: A Journal of Travels in the year 1838. Vol. 3. Boston: Crocker & Brewster.
