= Jdeideh, Baalbek =

Jdeideh
- Village
- Location in Lebanon
- Coordinates: 34°14′52.7″N 36°23′13.4″E
- Country: Lebanon
- Governorate: Baalbek-Hermel
- District: Baalbek

Jdeideh (Arabic: جديده), also known as Jdeidet al-Fekha, is a little village located in the northern part of the Baalbek District of Lebanon, on the main road between the city of Baalbek and the city of Hermel.

The population of Jdeideh originates mainly from the nearby village of Fakiha which is located about 1km off road in a valley of the mountain range of Anti-Lebanon.

== Gallery ==
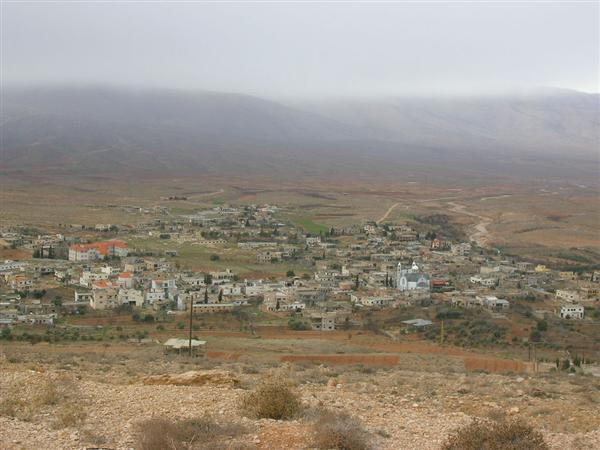

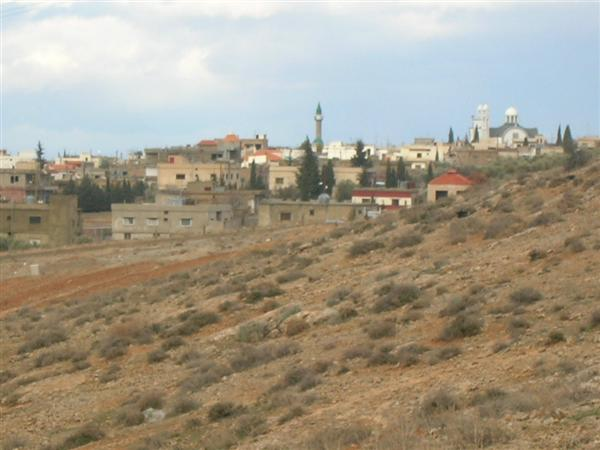
