= Kfar Habou =

Village in the Miniyeh-Danniyeh District in the North Governorate of Lebanon

Kfar Habou كفرحبو
- Interactive map of Kfar Habou
- Location within Lebanon
- Coordinates: 34°24′52″N 35°57′34″E
- Country: Lebanon
- Governorate: North Governorate
- Districts of Lebanon: Miniyeh-Danniyeh District

Area
  - Total: 7.41 km^{2} (2.86 sq mi)
- Time zone: +2
  - Summer (DST): +3

Kfar Habou (Arabic: كفرحبو, romanized: Kfar Ḥabū) is a village located in the Miniyeh-Danniyeh District, in the North Governorate of Lebanon. It had 2,647 eligible voters in the 2009 elections, and the residents belongs to the "Greek Orthodox Church and other confessions".

== History ==
In 1838, Eli Smith noted the village as Kefr Habau, located in the Ed-Dunniyeh area.

== Demographics ==
In 2014, Christians made up 80.76% and Muslims made up 15.60% of registered voters in Kfar Habou. 70.52% of the voters were Greek Orthodox and 15.49% were Sunni Muslims.

== Bibliography ==
- Robinson, E.; Smith, E. (1841). Biblical Researches in Palestine, Mount Sinai and Arabia Petraea: A Journal of Travels in the year 1838. Vol. 3. Boston: Crocker & Brewster.
