= Salah Bachir =

Canadian patron of the arts and publisher (1955–2026)

Salah Bachir CM OOnt
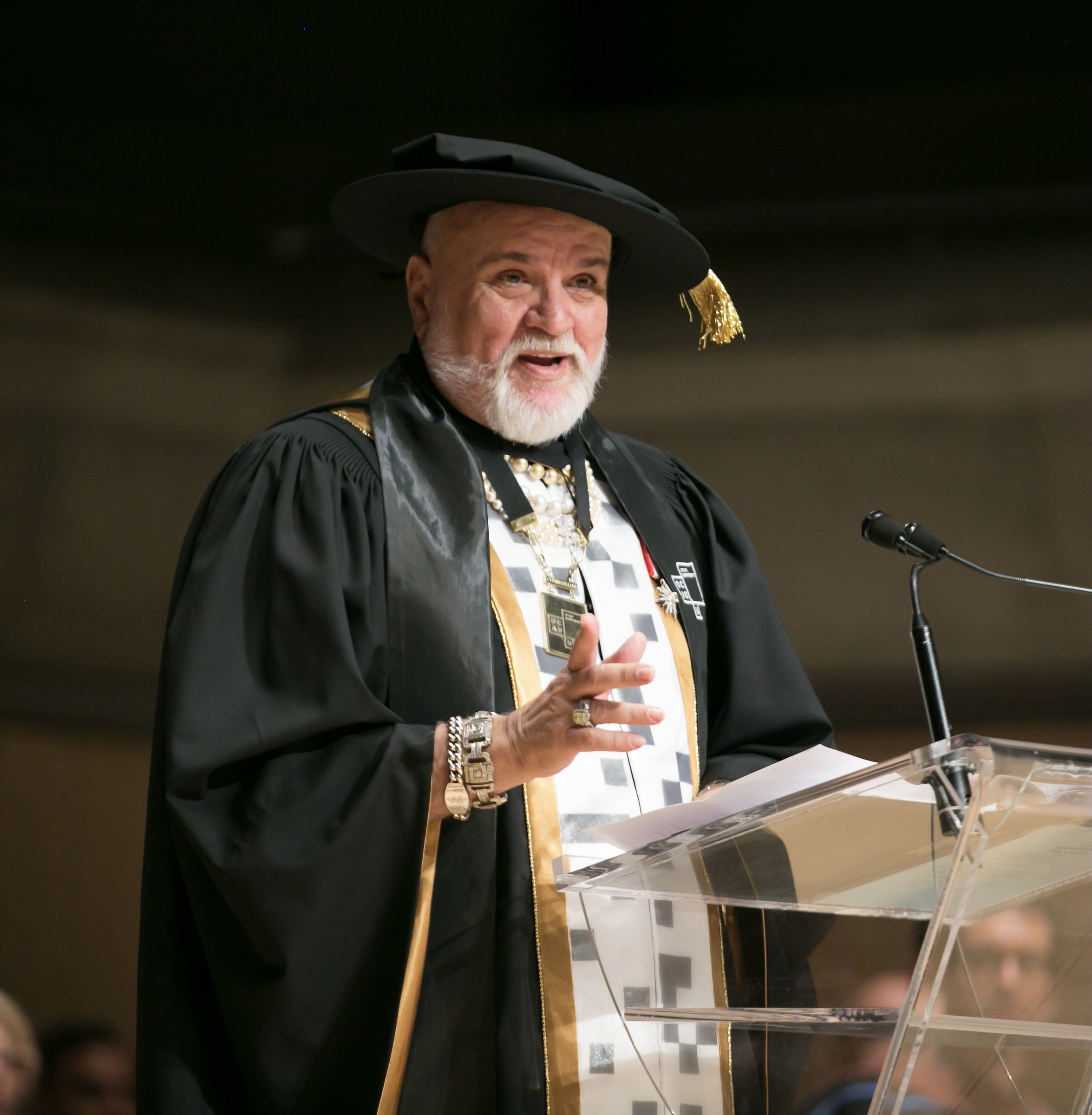
- Bachir as Chancellor of OCAD University, 2021
- Born: October 3, 1955; Kfarhata, Lebanon
- Died: October 8, 2026 (aged 71); Toronto, Ontario, Canada
- Occupations: Business executive, publisher, art collector, author, and philanthropist
- Spouse: Jacob Yerex

Salah John Bachir, CM OOnt (October 3, 1955 – October 8, 2026) was a Canadian business executive, publisher, art collector, fundraiser and philanthropist. He created Phamous Characters, a media, production, publishing and sponsorship entity, which he ran until his death. From 2005 to 2021, Bachir was the president of Cineplex Media, where he was publisher of Cineplex Magazine, negotiated theatre naming rights with Scotiabank, and co-founded the Scene loyalty card program.

In June 2017, he was appointed the fourth Chancellor of Toronto's OCAD University, one of Canada's pre-eminent schools of art, design and digital media. He was profiled by numerous publications, including The Globe and Mail, Playback Magazine, Dolce, Toronto Life, and others. He received five honorary doctorates from the University of Alberta, Ryerson University, York University, OCAD University and Wilfrid Laurier University in recognition of his business acumen and philanthropy. His philanthropic efforts were focused on support of dialysis centres at St. Joseph’s Health Centre in Toronto.

On October 17, 2023, Bachir's memoir First to Leave the Party: My Life with Ordinary People ...Who Happen to Be Famous was published by Penguin Random House Canada.

== Early life ==
Bachir was born in Kfarhata, Lebanon on October 3, 1955. In 1965, his family immigrated to Canada where they resided in Rexdale, a district of Toronto. Salah played numerous sports when he was growing up, including hockey, football and lacrosse. When he was 15 years old, he picketed outside a Dominion store to support Cesar Chavez and the farm workers during the grape boycott, raising $150 for the cause.

== Career ==
Bachir began his career in publishing in 1980 with the first consumer video magazine in Canada, Videomania, and in 1984, started the trade publication, Premiere, to serve the needs of the burgeoning video distribution and retail sectors. He also co-produced an annual trade show, Focus on Video, celebrating the Canadian film industry, which he ran for 15 years. During this period, he helped launch several home video labels, including Disney, Universal, Vestron and Thorn EMI, as well as two creative agencies, Imaginus Graphics and New Image Complete Print Services.

In 1999, Bachir moved on to become the founding president and chair of Famous Players Media, a new in-cinema advertising and marketing partnership with Famous Players Theatres and Viacom. Bachir also personally launched the in-house magazines Famous, Famous Quebec and Famous Kids, which became some of Canada’s successful magazines in terms of readership.

In 2005 Cineplex acquired Famous Players, which included Bachir’s 49 percent ownership of Famous Players Media. Cineplex engaged Bachir’s company Phamous Characters to set up and run the media company and subsequently Bachir became president of Cineplex Media. Cineplex also purchased Famous magazines from Bachir, which he rebranded as Cineplex magazines and which in turn became the most-read magazine in Canada, with over 4.3 million readers per issue at its peak.

Bachir became president of the newly created Cineplex Media division. He expanded the business, making it Canada’s largest cinema and digital place-based media network, with thousands of screens across the country located in high-traffic business areas, including shopping centres and cinemas, for both Cineplex and other chains. Cineplex Media was perennially one of Cineplex’s most profitable divisions, contributing significantly to its EBITDA.

== Scene loyalty program ==
Bachir helped revolutionize the Canadian movie theatre business when he brought Cineplex Media into a multi-year, multi-pronged partnership with Scotiabank that included the Scene Loyalty Program. Working closely with Rick White, Scotiabank’s VP of Marketing and Branding, Bachir achieved success with innovative, customer-related programmes. Scotiabank, which had never done a naming rights program previously, branded five additional theatres and all of the Cineplex VIP Cinemas.

Today, the Scene+ program has over 10 million members, has expanded to include Sobeys and Home Hardware and is currently valued at over $1.5 billion. Both Cineplex and Scotiabank attribute a huge increase in brand equity, loyalty and inroads to a younger demographic audience to the success of these programs.

On June 1, 2017, Bachir became Chancellor of OCAD University. He succeeded Catherine Delaney, the Honourable James K. Bartleman and Rosalie Sharp in that role.

== Patron of the arts ==
Bachir was an avid art collector and patron of mostly Canadian art. His diverse collection of more than 3,000 pieces featured many works by Canadian artists such as Betty Goodwin, Stephen Andrews and Attila Richard Lukacs.

In 2014, an extensive show of Bachir's pieces titled "Over the Rainbow" was mounted at the Museum of Contemporary Canadian Art (MOCCA) in Toronto. The exhibition featured such well-known artists as Stephen Andrews, Atilla Richard Lukacs, Betty Goodwin, Andy Warhol, Keith Haring and Herb Ritts, and examined themes of seduction and identity.

In a 2013 Toronto Star article, writer Rita Zekas lists many of the artists, Canadian and international, whose works hung in Bachir's Toronto home. "There are more Warhols here than you can shake a tin of Campbell’s soup at. Walls and walls of Warhol Polaroids and lithographs, purchased at auctions and from galleries," she writes. "There’s Ingrid Bergman by Warhol; Mick Jagger by Warhol. Plus Mandela by Herb Ritts; Einstein by Yousuf Karsh; and assorted photography by Henri Cartier-Bresson, Helmut Newton, Bruce Weber, Robert Mapplethorpe and Man Ray."

Compared to Cosimo de' Medici by The Globe and Mail for his role in forging now-famous talent, Bachir sponsored four shows of Lukacs’ work and a joint exhibition of works by Lukacs and Andrews at the University of Toronto's Hart House.

In 2006, 60 pieces from his Andy Warhol collection were displayed at the Oakville Galleries; the same gallery hosted an acclaimed show of Bachir's Betty Goodwin collection in the spring of 2010. In 2014, an extensive show of Bachir's pieces was mounted at the Museum of Contemporary Canadian Art in Toronto.

Bachir donated art and money to major collections, including:

- National Gallery of Canada
- Art Gallery of Ontario
- Oakville Galleries
- The Image Centre at Toronto Metropolitan University
- Hart House at the University of Toronto
- London Regional Gallery
- Art Gallery of Hamilton
- Simon Fraser University
- Rideau Hall
- Morris and Helen Belkin Art Gallery at UBC in Vancouver
- Art Gallery of York University

== Fundraising and philanthropy ==
In 2013, The Globe and Mail dubbed Bachir “Gala Salah” in reference to the more than 100 fundraising luncheons and galas he hosted, including the annual 519 Gala in support of The 519; the Governor General's Performing Arts Awards Gala; the annual Salah Bachir Show in support of St. Joseph's Health Centre Foundation; the Wild Bird Ball, in conjunction with author Margaret Atwood, in support of the Pelee Island Bird Observatory; Camp Ooch's Imagine the Magic gala; and the Art Gallery of Ontario’s Chagall and Picasso Galas.

== Personal life and death ==
Bachir was openly gay. He lived with his husband, the artist Jacob Yerex.

Bachir died thorough medical aid at home in Toronto on October 8, 2026, at the age of 71, following a long illness.

== Awards, honours and recognition ==
Bachir received many honours, awards, and plaudits for his philanthropy. He was a member of the Order of Ontario and the Order of Canada for "his leadership as an entrepreneur and for his commitment to the arts and social justice, notably through Toronto's the 519 community centre.” He was twice Grand Marshal of Toronto's Pride Parade, in 2005 and 2016.

Among Bachir’s other awards were:

- The June Callwood Outstanding Volunteer Award, from the Ontario Ministry of Tourism, Culture and Sport – 2021
- The Legacy Award, from Canada’s LGBT+ Chamber of Commerce – 2021
- Man of the Year Award and Daring to Be Great Award, from Famous People Players – 2008, 2018
- The MOCCA Award in Contemporary Art, from MOCA Toronto (formerly MOCCA) – 2015
- Lifetime Achievement Award, from Pride Toronto – 2009
- International Outstanding Volunteer Fundraiser, from the Association of Fundraising Professionals – 2017
- The Human Relations Award from the Canadian Centre for Diversity – 2012
- Playback Magazine Hall of Fame — 2017

There are numerous public spaces named after Bachir in artistic, health and non-profit venues, including a wing of The 519, the New Media Wall at The Image Centre at Toronto Metropolitan University, rooms at the Art Gallery of Ontario and the Oakville Galleries, and the Bachir-Yerex Family Dialysis Clinic at St. Joseph’s Health Centre.

Bachir held honorary Doctorates from York University (2015), Toronto Metropolitan University (2015), the University of Alberta (2016), OCAD University (2017) and Wilfrid Laurier University (2022).
