= Temnine Et Tahta =

Temnine Et Tahta تمنين التحتا
- Village
- Location in Lebanon
- Coordinates: 33°53′01″N 35°59′29″E
- Country: Lebanon
- Governorate: Baalbek-Hermel Governorate
- District: Baalbek District
- Elevation: 3,150 ft (960 m)
- Time zone: UTC+2 (EET)
  - Summer (DST): +3

Temnine Et Tahta (Arabic: تمنين التحتا, romanized: Temnīn et-Taḥtā) is a village located in the Baalbek District of the Baalbek-Hermel Governorate in Lebanon.

== History ==
In 1838, Eli Smith noted Temnin the lower's population as being predominantly Metawileh.

== Bibliography ==
- Robinson, E.; Smith, E. (1841). Biblical Researches in Palestine, Mount Sinai and Arabia Petraea: A Journal of Travels in the year 1838. Vol. 3. Boston: Crocker & Brewster.
