= Majdaloun =

Majdaloun مجدلون
- Village
- Location in Lebanon
- Coordinates: 33°59′20″N 36°08′10″E
- Country: Lebanon
- Governorate: Baalbek-Hermel Governorate
- District: Baalbek District
- Elevation: 3,410 ft (1,040 m)
- Time zone: UTC+2 (EET)
  - Summer (DST): +3

Majdaloun (Arabic: مجدلون, romanized: Majdalūn, also Majdloun) is a village in the Baalbek District, in Baalbek-Hermel, one of the governorates of Lebanon. Majdaloun is one of the eighty-three municipalities of the Baalbek-Hermel Governorate and of 1,052 for the whole of Lebanon.

== History ==
In 1838, Eli Smith noted Mejdelun as a village in the plain in the Baalbek area.

== Demographics ==
In 2014, Majdaloun had 1,015 registered voters. Of these adult-aged villagers, 528 (52%) were Christians, predominantly of the Maronite Church, with 293 members (28.9% of the total voters). There were also Melkite Greek Catholic – and other Eastern-rite Catholics (Note: Besides Maronites, the number of Eastern-rite Catholics were 111 Melkites and one Armenian Catholic. There was a single Latin Catholic counted. In addition to the 115 Greek Orthodox Christians, there were a few members of Oriental Orthodox churches. One voter was designated "Evangelical (Protestant)" and another as simply "Christian". Numbers for these denominations with small populations present are listed below: Christian, not otherwise specified – 1; Evangelical Protestant – 1; Catholic: Latin (Western-rite) Catholic – 1; Eastern Catholics: Armenian Catholic – 1; Oriental Orthodox: Armenian Orthodox – 1; Syriac Orthodox – 4; The religion or denomination of nine villagers was unstated or not collected.) – (11%), and Greek Orthodox (8.8%) minorities. Almost all of the 478 Muslims were Shiites (44.5%), with a small number of Sunni Muslims (2.6%). Combined, the 478 Muslims were 47.1% of village voters.

== See also ==
- Tell Majdaloun
