= Mandaloun (disambiguation) =

Mandaloun may refer to:

- Mandaloun, a type of window
- Mandaloun (horse), American thoroughbred race horse
- Majdaloun, alt. spelling for this Lebanese village
