= Bodai =

- Town
- Location within Lebanon
- Coordinates: 34°03′40″N 36°03′40″E
- Country: Lebanon
- Governorate: Baalbek-Hermel
- District: Baalbek
- Elevation: 3,540 ft (1,080 m)

Population
  - Estimate: 8,000

Bodai (Arabic: بوداي) is a Lebanese town in Baalbek District, Baalbek-Hermel Governorate, situated west of the Litani River in the foothills of Mount Lebanon. Bodai is located 15 km (9 miles) northwest of the ancient city of Baalbek and 26 km (16 miles) from the Lebanese–Syrian border and is 90 kilometers (55.926 mi) away from the capital of Beirut. Bodai, which sits in the foothills of the Mount Lebanon range, has views across the Beqaa Valley toward the city of Baalbek, and the Anti-Lebanon range that divides Lebanon from Syria.

== History and etymology ==
There is a possibility that the etymology of the town's present day name Bodai could be traced to the time of the French Crusaders' County of Tripoli within Mount Lebanon region and the possibility that the French Crusaders named the village or the area after the Maison Boudai, situated within Montbozon, a commune in the Haute-Saône department in the region of Franche-Comté in eastern France.

In 1838, Eli Smith noted Budey's population as being predominantly Metawileh.

== Population ==
The settlement is almost entirely populated by Shiites.

A significant percentage of the town population have migrated to the capital city of Beirut. Also, a significant percentage of the town population have migrated overseas to countries such as Brazil, Argentina, United States of America, Canada, Australia, Mexico, Gulf Arab states, and European Union (UK and France).

== Notable people ==
- Ali Hussein Nassif
- Mohammad Yazbek
- Mohammed Shamas

== See also ==
- Tell Aalaq
- Flaoui
- List of cities and towns in Lebanon
- List of municipalities of Lebanon

== Bibliography ==
- Robinson, E.; Smith, E. (1841). Biblical Researches in Palestine, Mount Sinai and Arabia Petraea: A Journal of Travels in the year 1838. Vol. 3. Boston: Crocker & Brewster.
