= Qarha, Baalbek =

Qarha قرحا
- Village
- Location in Lebanon
- Coordinates: 34°9′59″N 36°12′36″E
- Country: Lebanon
- Governorate: Baalbek-Hermel Governorate
- District: Baalbek District
- Elevation: 3,688 ft (1,124 m)
- Time zone: UTC+2 (EET)
  - Summer (DST): +3

Qarha (Arabic: قرحا, romanized: Qarḥā) is a village located in the Baalbek District of the Baalbek-Hermel Governorate in Lebanon. It is a Shia Muslim village.
