= Haouch Snaid =

Haouch Snaid حوش سنيد
- Village
- Location in Lebanon
- Coordinates: 33°55′40″N 36°05′10″E
- Country: Lebanon
- Governorate: Baalbek-Hermel Governorate
- District: Baalbek District
- Elevation: 3,180 ft (970 m)
- Time zone: UTC+2 (EET)
  - Summer (DST): +3

Haouch Snaid (Arabic: حوش سنيد, romanized: Ḥawsh Snayd) is a Lebanese local authority in the Baalbek District in Baalbek-Hermel Governorate.

== History ==
In 1838, Eli Smith noted Haush Suneid as a village in the Baalbek area. It is a Shiite village.

== Bibliography ==
- Robinson, E.; Smith, E. (1841). Biblical Researches in Palestine, Mount Sinai and Arabia Petraea: A Journal of Travels in the year 1838. Vol. 3. Boston: Crocker & Brewster.
