= Serraaine El Tahta =

Agricultural village in the Bekaa Valley in Lebanon

Saraaine El Tahta سرعين التحتا
- Location in Lebanon
- Coordinates: 33°53′10″N 36°4′4″E
- Country: Lebanon
- Governorate: Baalbek-Hermel
- District: Baalbek
- Time zone: UTC+2 (EET)
  - Summer (DST): +3

Saraaine El Tahta (Arabic: سرعين التحتا) (also spelled Sareen, Serraine El Tahta, Saraain El Tahta) is a village in the Baalbek-Hermel Governorate in eastern Lebanon. Its inhabitants are Christians.

The Church of Saint Georges in Saraaine was destroyed during the war in 1976. Under the auspices of Bishop Al-Hashem, the Bishop of Baalbeck, and the patronage of Ms. Manell P. Brice, a member of the editorial board of the Journal of Maronite Studies, the rebuilding of the church began in 1999. There are five churches in Saraaine El Tahta: Saint Elias (Maronite Church), Saint Challita (Maronite Church), Saint Georges (Maronite Church), Saint Elias (Catholic Orthodox Church) and The Shrine of Our Lady of Birth.
