= Aaiyat =

Town in Akkar District, Lebanon

Aaiyat عين زهر النبات، عيات
- town
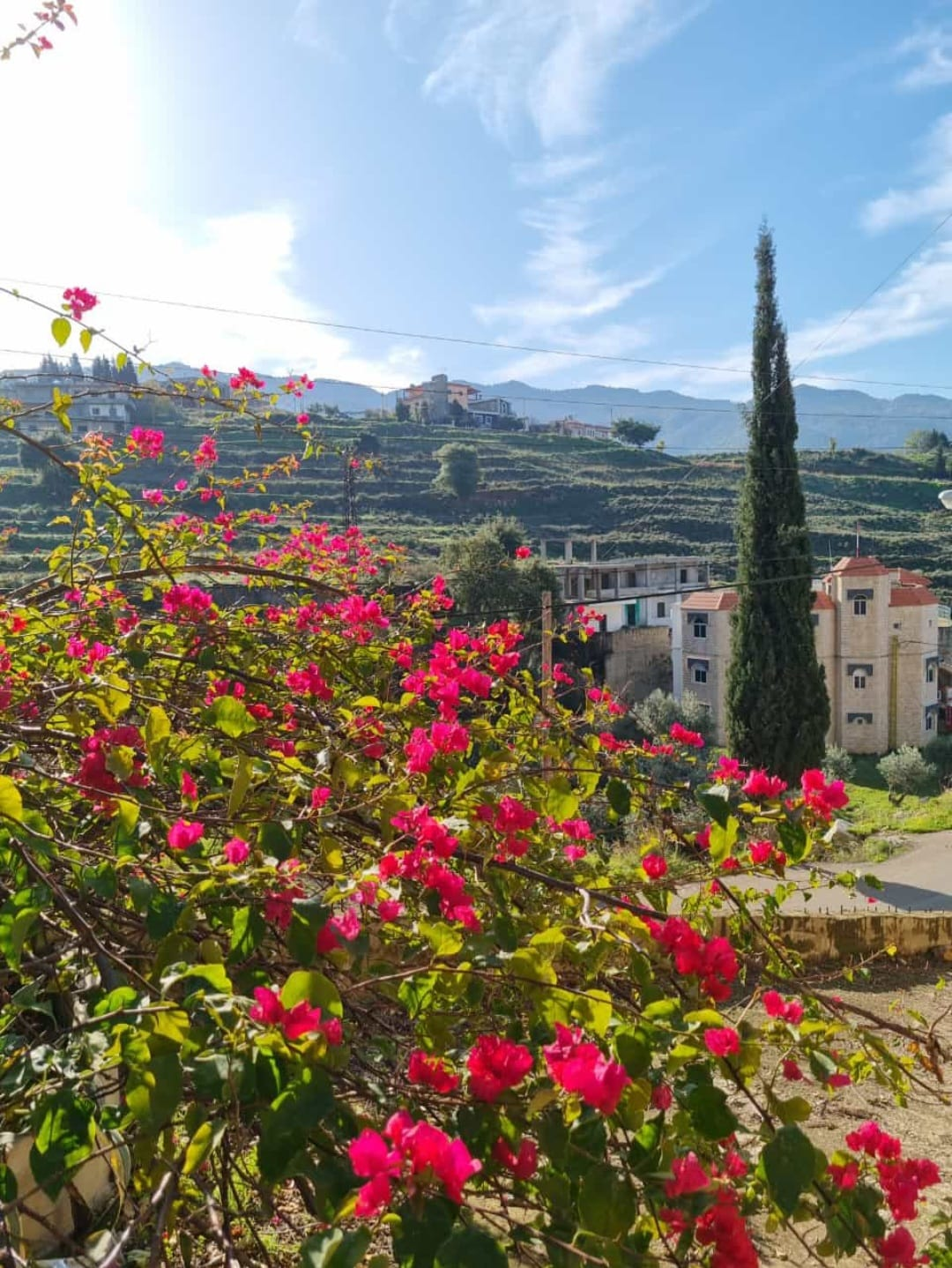

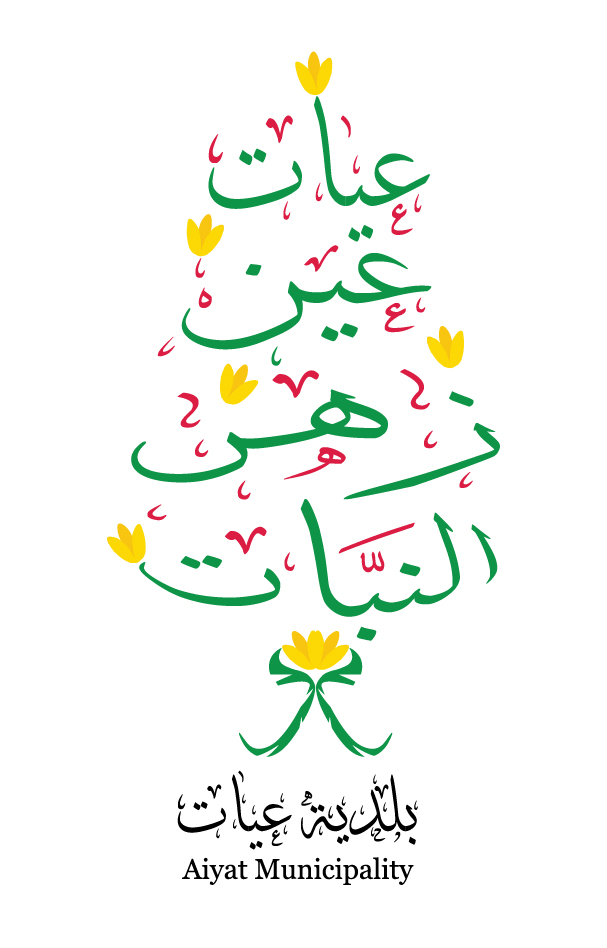
- Seal

- Location within Lebanon
- Coordinates: 34°32′08″N 36°11′53″E
- Country: Lebanon
- Governorate: Akkar
- District: Akkar

Area
  - Total: 2.78 km^{2} (1.07 sq mi)
- Elevation: 680 m (2,230 ft)

Population (2009)
  - Total: 2,133 eligible voters
  - Density: 767/km^{2} (1,990/sq mi)
- Time zone: UTC+2 (EET)
  - Summer (DST): UTC+3 (EEST)
- Dialing code: +961

Aaiyat (Arabic: عين زهر النبات، عيات, romanized: ʿAyāt) is a town in Akkar Governorate, Lebanon. It is located on the side of Helena Mountain in Chakqouf and between Beino Village and Al - Burj Village. The population is mostly Sunni Muslim.

== Name ==
The name (the eye of plant flower عين زهر النبات ) is the definition of Spartium junceum, which has yellow flowers. It was used in the town for engagement celebrations for its beautiful smell.

== History ==
In 1838, Eli Smith noted the place as "Ayat", located east of esh-Sheikh Mohammed. The inhabitants were Sunni Muslim.

It was the governance center of Mera'abi family princess in Akkar.
