= Khreibeh =

Khreibeh الخريبة
- Village
- Location in Lebanon
- Coordinates: 33°52′18″N 36°09′46″E
- Country: Lebanon
- Governorate: Baalbek-Hermel Governorate
- District: Baalbek District

Population
  - Estimate (2015): 2,295
- Time zone: UTC+2 (EET)
  - Summer (DST): +3

Khreibeh (Arabic: الخريبة, romanized: al-Khraybeh) is a village in eastern Lebanon located in the Baalbek District in Baalbek-Hermel Governorate.

== History ==
In 1838, Eli Smith noted el-Khureibeh as a Metawileh village in the Baalbek area.

== Bibliography ==
- Robinson, E.; Smith, E. (1841). Biblical Researches in Palestine, Mount Sinai and Arabia Petraea: A Journal of Travels in the year 1838. Vol. 3. Boston: Crocker & Brewster.
