= Hlabta =

Hlabta حلبتا
- Village
- Location in Lebanon
- Coordinates: 34°15′19″N 36°17′15″E
- Country: Lebanon
- Governorate: Baalbek-Hermel Governorate
- District: Baalbek District
- Elevation: 3,900 ft (1,200 m)
- Time zone: UTC+2 (EET)
  - Summer (DST): +3

Hlabta (Arabic: حلبتا, romanized: Ḥlabtā) is a village located in the Baalbek District of the Baalbek-Hermel Governorate in Lebanon.
