= Saaideh =

Saaideh السعيدة
- Village
- Location in Lebanon
- Coordinates: 34°01′17″N 36°4′53″E
- Country: Lebanon
- Governorate: Baalbek-Hermel Governorate
- District: Baalbek District
- Elevation: 1,010 m (3,310 ft)
- Time zone: UTC+2 (EET)
  - Summer (DST): +3

Saaideh (Arabic: السعيدة, romanized: as-Sʿaydeh) is a local authority in the Baalbek District of the Baalbek-Hermel Governorate in Lebanon.

== History ==
In 1838, Eli Smith noted es-Su'eiyideh's population as being predominantly "Greek" Christians.

== Bibliography ==
- Robinson, E.; Smith, E. (1841). Biblical Researches in Palestine, Mount Sinai and Arabia Petraea: A Journal of Travels in the year 1838. Vol. 3. Boston: Crocker & Brewster.
