= Chaat, Lebanon =

Chaat شعث
- Town
- Location in Lebanon
- Coordinates: 34°8′30″N 36°13′56″E
- Country: Lebanon
- Governorate: Baalbek-Hermel Governorate
- District: Baalbek District
- Elevation: 3,300 ft (1,000 m)
- Time zone: UTC+2 (EET)
  - Summer (DST): +3

Chaat (Arabic: شعث) is a town located in the Baalbek District of the Baalbek-Hermel Governorate in Lebanon.

== Demographics ==
As of 2022, the town had 6,322 registered voters, of whom 71.3% were Shia Muslim and 28.2% of whom were Sunni Muslim. The town also had 1,819 registered Syrian refugees at the end of the same year.
