= Hizzine =

Hizzine حزين
- Village
- Location in Lebanon
- Coordinates: 33°58′14″N 36°5′36″E
- Country: Lebanon
- Governorate: Baalbek-Hermel Governorate
- District: Baalbek District
- Elevation: 3,250 ft (990 m)
- Time zone: UTC+2 (EET)
  - Summer (DST): +3

Hizzine (Arabic: حزين, romanized: Ḥizzīn) is a village located in the Baalbek District of the Baalbek-Hermel Governorate in Lebanon.

== Tell Hazzine ==
The archaeological site Tell Hazzine (Hizzin) is nearby. This site became active in the EB IV. An occupation reached its peak in the MB II and continue in the LB. By the time of the Iron I and II, it was a smaller site.
