= Deir Ammar, Lebanon =

Town in Lebanon

Deir Ammar دير عمار
- Town
- Location within Lebanon
- Coordinates: 34.46475°N 35.894674°E
- Country: Lebanon
- Governorate: North Governorate
- District: Miniyeh–Danniyeh District

Population
  - Total: 6,109
- Time zone: +2
  - Summer (DST): +3

Deir Ammar (Arabic: دير عمار) is a town in northern Lebanon located about 3 km north of Tripoli. It is in the North Governorate and the Miniyeh–Danniyeh District. Deir Ammar is known for its mediterranean shorline and the Deir Ammar power plant, an active electric utility facility located near the coast.

== History ==
From 1998 to 2002, the 3 units that constitute the CCGT Power Plant were built. This infrastructure is a Gas Power Plant with a design capacity of 470 MWe. It is operated by Électricité du Liban (EDL) and Enel Produzione.

In August 2023, Primesouth Lebanon, which operates the Deir Ammar power plant on behalf of Électricité du Liban (EDL), shut down the plant over unpaid dues. The Energy Ministry negotiated with Primesouth Lebanon, the Ministry of Finance and Banque du Liban (BDL) to reopen the vital power plant.

On 1 October 2026, the Lebanese Government approved a regasification project in Deir Ammar to allow the maritime import of liquefied natural gas. Developed in a public-private partnership, this infrastructure will diversify energy supply and power generation.

== Demographics ==
The population was 6,109 in 2015.

Historical population
Year	Pop.	±% p.a.
1975	1,674	—
1990	2,411	+2.46%
2000	3,265	+3.08%
2015	6,109	+4.27%
Source: City-facts
