= Haouch Barada =

Haouch Barada حوش بردى
- Village
- Location in Lebanon
- Coordinates: 34°00′36″N 36°07′15″E
- Country: Lebanon
- Governorate: Baalbek-Hermel Governorate
- District: Baalbek District
- Time zone: UTC+2 (EET)
  - Summer (DST): +3

Haouch Barada (Arabic: حوش بردى, romanized: Ḥawsh Baradā) is a village in the Baalbek District in Baalbek-Hermel Governorate.

== History ==
In 1838, Eli Smith noted Haush Burada as a Maronite and "Greek Christian" village in the Baalbek area.

== Bibliography ==
- Robinson, E.; Smith, E. (1841). Biblical Researches in Palestine, Mount Sinai and Arabia Petraea: A Journal of Travels in the year 1838. Vol. 3. Boston: Crocker & Brewster.
