= Haouch Er Rafqa =

Haouch Er Rafqa حوش الرافقة
- Village
- Location in Lebanon
- Coordinates: 33°55′25″N 36°02′42″E
- Country: Lebanon
- Governorate: Baalbek-Hermel Governorate
- District: Baalbek District
- Elevation: 3,087 ft (941 m)
- Time zone: UTC+2 (EET)
  - Summer (DST): +3

Haouch Er Rafqa (Arabic: حوش الرافقة, romanized: Ḥawsh er-Rāfqah) is a Lebanese local authority in the Baalbek District in Baalbek-Hermel Governorate.

== History ==
In 1838, Eli Smith noted Haush er-Rafika as a Metawileh village in the Baalbek area.

== Bibliography ==
- Robinson, E.; Smith, E. (1841). Biblical Researches in Palestine, Mount Sinai and Arabia Petraea: A Journal of Travels in the year 1838. Vol. 3. Boston: Crocker & Brewster.
