= Achache =

Achache is a surname. Notable people with the surname include:

- Carole Achache (1952–2016), French writer, photographer and actress
- Jean Achache (born 1952), French film producer, screenwriter, director, and writer
- José Achache (born 1953), French scientist
- Mona Achache (born 1981), Moroccan-French film director
