= Bebnine =

Bebnine ببنين
- Town
- Location in Lebanon
- Coordinates: 34°29′54″N 35°59′45″E
- Country: Lebanon
- Governorate: Akkar
- District: Akkar
- Elevation: 330 ft (100 m)
- Time zone: UTC+2 (EET)
  - Summer (DST): +3

Bebnine (Arabic: ببنين) is a town located in the Akkar District of the Akkar Governorate in Lebanon. Its inhabitants are primarily Sunni Muslims.

== History ==
In 1838, Eli Smith noted the village, whose inhabitants were Sunni Muslims and Greek Orthodox, located west of esh-Sheikh Mohammed.

In 1856 it was named Bibnin on Kiepert's map of Palestine/Lebanon published that year.

== Demographics ==
In 2014, Muslims made up 99.79% of registered voters in Bebnine. 99.50% of the voters were Sunni Muslims.

== Bibliography ==
- Robinson, E.; Smith, E. (1841). Biblical Researches in Palestine, Mount Sinai and Arabia Petraea: A Journal of Travels in the year 1838. Vol. 3. Boston: Crocker & Brewster.
