= Koucha =

Village in Akkar District, Lebanon

Koucha كوشا
- village
- Location within Lebanon
- Coordinates: 34°33′50″N 36°05′59″E
- Country: Lebanon
- Governorate: Akkar
- District: Akkar
- Elevation: 150 m (490 ft)

Population (2009)
  - Total: 828 eligible voters
- Time zone: UTC+2 (EET)
  - Summer (DST): UTC+3 (EEST)
- Dialing code: +961

Koucha (Arabic: كوشا, romanized: Kūshā, also Kaoucha) is a village in Akkar Governorate, Lebanon.

The population is mostly Sunni Muslim.

== History ==
In 1838, Eli Smith noted the place as Kusha, located east of esh-Sheikh Mohammed. The inhabitants were Isma'ilites.

== Bibliography ==
- Robinson, E.; Smith, E. (1841). Biblical Researches in Palestine, Mount Sinai and Arabia Petraea: A Journal of Travels in the year 1838. Vol. 3. Boston: Crocker & Brewster.
