= Nfisseh =

Nfisseh النفيسه
- village
- Location within Lebanon
- Coordinates: 34°32′51″N 36°05′13″E
- Country: Lebanon
- Governorate: Akkar
- District: Akkar

Area
  - Total: 0.75 km^{2} (0.29 sq mi)
- Elevation: 220 m (720 ft)

Population (2009)
  - Total: 604 eligible voters
  - Density: 810/km^{2} (2,100/sq mi)
- Time zone: UTC+2 (EET)
  - Summer (DST): UTC+3 (EEST)
- Dialing code: +961

Nfisseh (Levantine Arabic: النفيسه, romanized: an-Nfīsseh), also Nfissé, is a town in Akkar Governorate, Lebanon.

The population of Nfisseh is mostly Greek Orthodox Christian or Maronite.

== History ==
In 1838, Eli Smith noted the village as 'en-Nufeiseh, whose inhabitants were Maronites, located east of esh-Sheikh Mohammed.

== Bibliography ==
- Robinson, E.; Smith, E. (1841). Biblical Researches in Palestine, Mount Sinai and Arabia Petraea: A Journal of Travels in the year 1838. Vol. 3. Boston: Crocker & Brewster.
