= Khraibeh, Chouf =

Village in Mount Lebanon Governorate

Khraibeh الخريبة
- Village
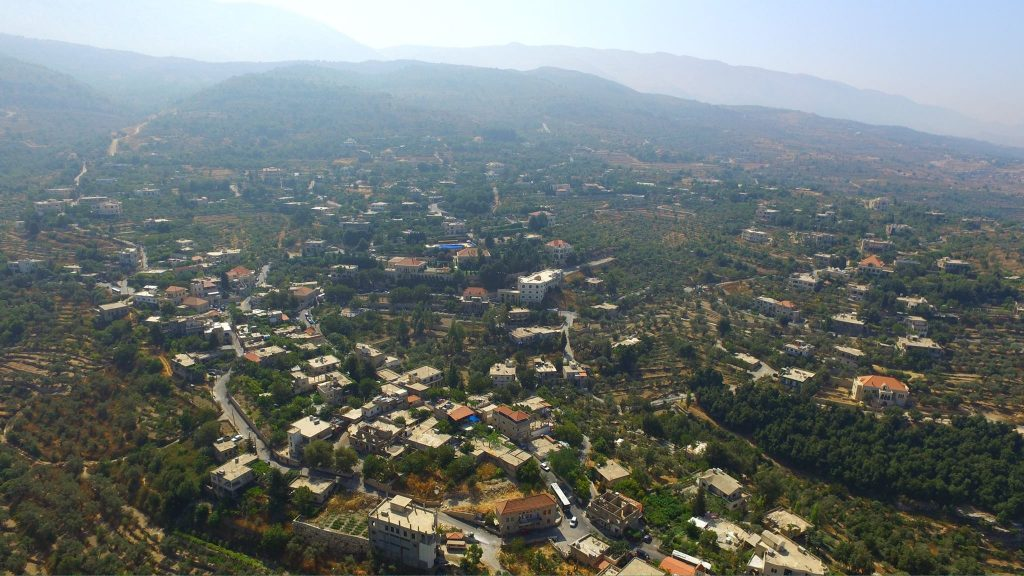
- Scenic view of Khraibeh, Chouf

- Location within Lebanon
- Coordinates: 33.64853°N 35.64306°E
- Country: Lebanon
- Governorate: Mount Lebanon Governorate
- District: Chouf District
- Elevation: 1,043 m (3,422 ft)
- Time zone: UTC+2 (EET)
  - Summer (DST): UTC+3 (EEST)
- Dialing code: +961

Khraibeh (Arabic: الخريبة) is a village in the Chouf District of the Mount Lebanon Governorate in Lebanon. It is situated at an elevation of approximately 1,043 metres (3,422 ft) above sea level.

== Geography ==
Khraibeh is located about 56 km from Beirut and roughly 7 km from the district capital, Beiteddine. It lies at the base of the Chouf high mountains, close to the cedar reserves of Barouk, Maaser el Shouf, and Ain Zhalta, all part of the Al Shouf Cedar Nature Reserve.

== History ==
Khraibeh is one of the historic settlements in the Chouf region, with a heritage that includes influences from the Ottoman era. It has been referenced in local historical and environmental records as part of the Druze heartland in Mount Lebanon.

== Demographics ==
As of 2015, the population of Khraibeh was approximately 2,160 residents, and the village covers an area of around 7.43 km^{2}.

In 2014, Druze made up 88.89% of registered voters in Khraibeh.

== Economy ==
The village's economy is centered on agriculture, particularly olive orchards and olive oil production. Due to its scenic environment and proximity to cedar reserves, eco-tourism also contributes to local income.

== Landmarks ==
- Traditional Lebanese stone houses
- Local Druze religious sites
- Scenic mountain viewpoints and hiking trails

== See also ==
- Chouf District
- Mount Lebanon Governorate
