= Tannoura, Lebanon =

Tannoura تنورة Tannura, Tanoura
- Village
- Location in Lebanon
- Coordinates: 33°28′25″N 35°48′10″E
- Country: Lebanon
- Governorate: Beqaa Governorate
- District: Rashaya District

Government
  - Mukhtar: Nabil Selman El Taki (as of 2020)
- Elevation: 3,300 ft (1,000 m)

Tannoura (Arabic: تنورة, romanized: Tannūrah) is a settlement located in the Rashaya District, Lebanon.

== History ==
In 1838, Eli Smith noted Tannura's population as being Druze.

== Bibliography ==
- Robinson, E.; Smith, E. (1841). Biblical Researches in Palestine, Mount Sinai and Arabia Petraea: A Journal of Travels in the year 1838. Vol. 3. Boston: Crocker & Brewster.
