= Zaarourieh =

Zaarourieh الزعرورية Zaarouriyeh
- Town
- Location within Lebanon
- Coordinates: 33°36′45″N 35°30′55″E
- Country: Lebanon
- Governorate: Mount Lebanon
- District: Chouf

Area
  - Total: 3.62 km^{2} (1.40 sq mi)
- Elevation: 700 m (2,300 ft)
- Time zone: UTC+2 (EET)
  - Summer (DST): UTC+3 (EEST)
- Dialing code: 07/ 980 139

Zaarouriye (Arabic: زعرورية, romanized: Zaʿrūriyah), also written Zaarourieh, is a town in the mountains of Chouf District in the Mont-Liban state of Lebanon. It is located 750 meters above sea level and is 40 kilometers from Beirut. Its population is estimated at 3,000 people in the summer, and is mainly Sunni and Maronite. Once an agricultural area with olives, figs and fruiting vines, its economy is now based on civil servants and a service economy.

Trees in the area include hawthorn, wild pine, carob and oak. There are two elementary schools, a middle school and a high school in a shared building.

== Demographics ==
As of 2014, the town of Zaarourieh had 2,125 registered voters. The largest sects were Sunni Muslims (79.95%) and Maronite Christians (14.64%).
