= Machha =

Machha مشحة
- village
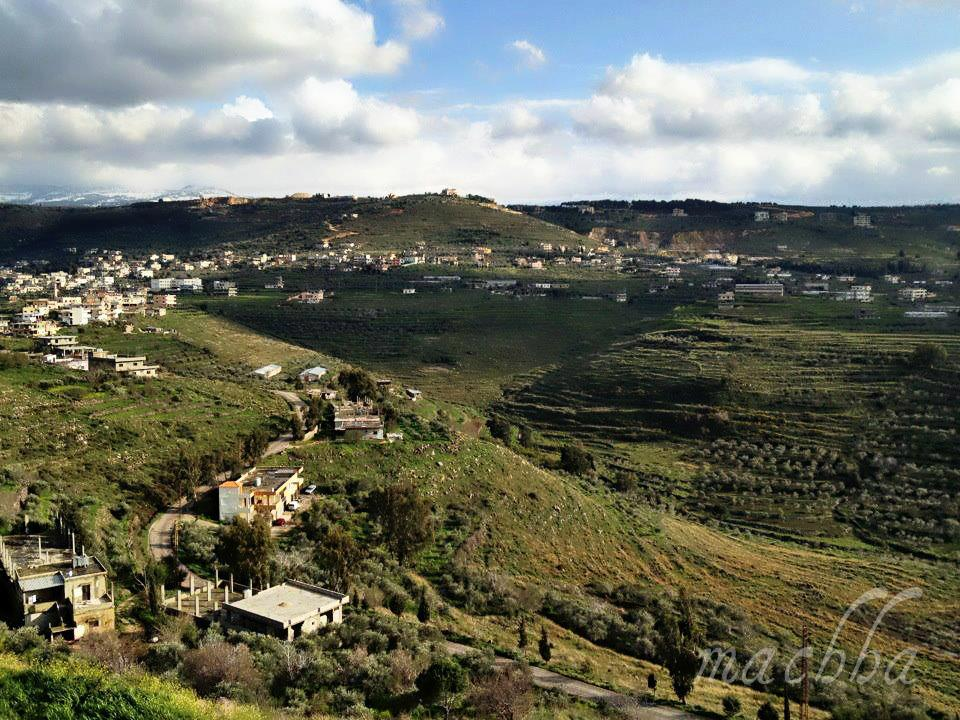
- Machha, 2014

- Location within Lebanon
- Coordinates: 34°32′30″N 36°06′53″E
- Country: Lebanon
- Governorate: Akkar
- District: Akkar

Area
  - Total: 5.72 km^{2} (2.21 sq mi)

Population (2009)
  - Total: 2,286 eligible voters
  - Density: 400/km^{2} (1,040/sq mi)
- Time zone: UTC+2 (EET)
  - Summer (DST): UTC+3 (EEST)
- Dialing code: +961

Machha (Arabic: مشحة, romanized: Mashḥah) is a town in Akkar Governorate, Lebanon. Its population comprises mostly Sunni Muslims.

== History ==
In 1838, Eli Smith noted the village as Meshha, located east of esh-Sheikh Mohammed. The residents were Sunni Muslims and Greek Orthodox Christians.

== Bibliography ==
- Robinson, E.; Smith, E. (1841). Biblical Researches in Palestine, Mount Sinai and Arabia Petraea: A Journal of Travels in the year 1838. Vol. 3. Boston: Crocker & Brewster.
