= Tall Bireh =

Tall Bireh تل بيبي
- village
- Location within Lebanon
- Coordinates: 34°37′21″N 36°03′31″E
- Country: Lebanon
- Governorate: Akkar
- District: Akkar

Area
  - Total: 5.08 km^{2} (1.96 sq mi)
- Elevation: 20 m (66 ft)

Population (2009)
  - Total: 1,439 eligible voters
  - Density: 283/km^{2} (734/sq mi)
- Time zone: UTC+2 (EET)
  - Summer (DST): UTC+3 (EEST)
- Dialing code: +961

Tall Bireh (Arabic: تل بيبي) is a town in Akkar Governorate, Lebanon.

The population is mostly Alawite.

== History ==
In 1838, Eli Smith noted the village as Tell el-Biry, located north of esh-Sheikh Mohammed. The inhabitants were Alawites.

== Bibliography ==
- Robinson, E.; Smith, E. (1841). Biblical Researches in Palestine, Mount Sinai and Arabia Petraea: A Journal of Travels in the year 1838. Vol. 3. Boston: Crocker & Brewster.
