= Khreibet Ej Jindi =

Khreibet Ej Jindi خريبة الجندي
- village
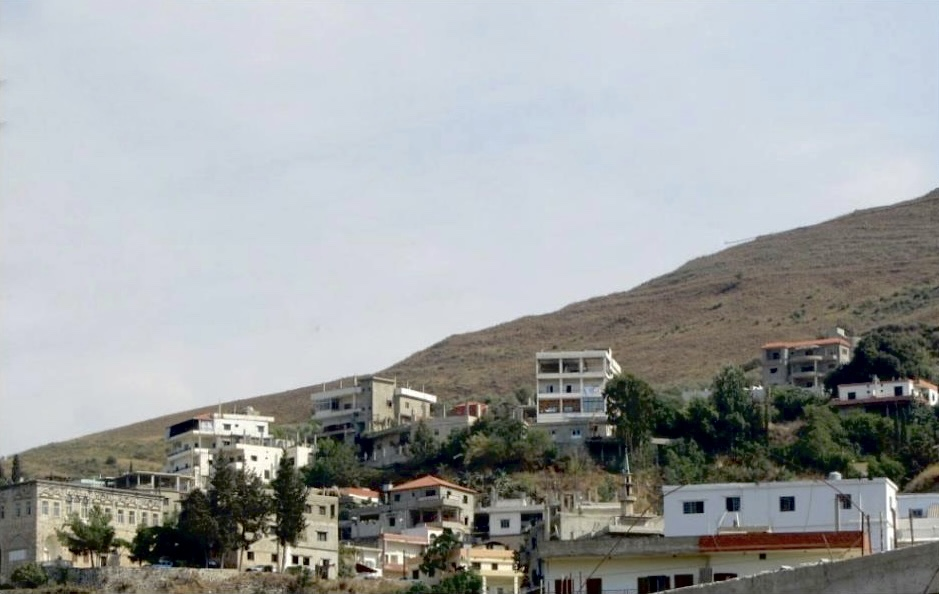
- Khreibet Ej Jindi, 2013

- Location within Lebanon
- Coordinates: 34°33′30″N 36°05′46″E
- Country: Lebanon
- Governorate: Akkar
- District: Akkar

Area
  - Total: 4.84 km^{2} (1.87 sq mi)
- Elevation: 150 m (490 ft)

Population (2009)
  - Total: 1,419 eligible voters
  - Density: 293/km^{2} (759/sq mi)
- Time zone: UTC+2 (EET)
  - Summer (DST): UTC+3 (EEST)
- Dialing code: +961

Khreibet Ej Jindi (Arabic: خريبة الجندي, romanized: Khraybat al-Jindī) is a town in Akkar Governorate, Lebanon.

The population is mostly Sunni Muslim.

== History ==
In 1838, Eli Smith noted the village as Khureibet el-Jundy, located east of esh-Sheikh Mohammed. The inhabitants were Sunni Muslims.

In 1856 it was named Khureibet el-Jundy on the map of Northern Palestine/Lebanon that Heinrich Kiepert published that year.

== Bibliography ==
- Robinson, E.; Smith, E. (1841). Biblical Researches in Palestine, Mount Sinai and Arabia Petraea: A Journal of Travels in the year 1838. Vol. 3. Boston: Crocker & Brewster.
