= Sayssouq =

Sayssouq سيسوق
- village
- Location within Lebanon
- Coordinates: 34°29′20″N 36°03′09″E
- Country: Lebanon
- Governorate: Akkar
- District: Akkar

Area
  - Total: 1.95 km^{2} (0.75 sq mi)
- Elevation: 410 m (1,350 ft)

Population (2009)
  - Total: 470 eligible voters
  - Density: 240/km^{2} (620/sq mi)
- Time zone: UTC+2 (EET)
  - Summer (DST): UTC+3 (EEST)
- Dialing code: +961

Sayssouq (Arabic: سيسوق, romanized: Sayssūq) is a village in Akkar Governorate, Lebanon.

The population in Sayssouq is mainly Maronite.

== History ==
In 1838, Eli Smith noted the village as Seisuk, whose inhabitants were Sunni Muslims and Maronite, located west of esh-Sheikh Mohammed.

In 1856 it was named Seisuk on the Kiepert's map of Palestine/Lebanon that Heinrich Kiepert published that year,

== Bibliography ==
- Robinson, E.; Smith, E. (1841). Biblical Researches in Palestine, Mount Sinai and Arabia Petraea: A Journal of Travels in the year 1838. Vol. 3. Boston: Crocker & Brewster.
