= Chlifa =

Chlifa شليفا
- Village
- Location in Lebanon
- Coordinates: 34°05′05″N 36°06′02″E
- Country: Lebanon
- Governorate: Baalbek-Hermel Governorate
- District: Baalbek District
- Elevation: 1,000 m (3,300 ft)
- Time zone: UTC+2 (EET)
  - Summer (DST): +3

Chlifa (Arabic: شليفا, romanized: Shlīfā) is a local authority in the Baalbek District of the Baalbek-Hermel Governorate in Lebanon.

Chlifa has a dry climate, in the summer temperatures reach 35 °C+ and in the winter they reach a -5 °C in January. They reach a moderate temperature in the autumn and spring (not over 20 °C).

This village has an old Roman palace located on the mountain between Btadhi and Chlifa.

Chlifa has a population of a few hundred people. It is well known for its fruit harvest, particularly the red dates. Other crops include apples, figs, cherries, peaches.

The village is full of life and its famous in the area for having seven churches, indicating its strictly Christian population.

== History ==
In 1838, Eli Smith noted Shelifa's population as being predominantly Catholic and Christians.

== Bibliography ==
- Robinson, E.; Smith, E. (1841). Biblical Researches in Palestine, Mount Sinai and Arabia Petraea: A Journal of Travels in the year 1838. Vol. 3. Boston: Crocker & Brewster.
