= Qraiyeh =

Qraiyeh القرية El-Qrayeh
- Municipality
- Location in Lebanon
- Coordinates: 33°32′17″N 35°25′05″E
- Country: Lebanon
- Governorate: South Governorate
- District: Sidon District
- Time zone: UTC+2 (EET)
  - Summer (DST): UTC+3 (EEST)

Qraiyeh (Arabic: القرية) is a municipality in the Sidon District of the South Governorate in Lebanon.

== History ==
In 1875 Victor Guérin described the village: "I went up to Krayeh, a village of 350 inhabitants, most of them Maronites. Beautiful plantations of fig and mulberry trees cover the slopes of the hill on the top of which it is situated."

== Demographics ==
In 2014, Christians made up 99.49% of registered voters in Qraiyeh. 76.12% of the voters were Maronite Catholics and 19.91% Greek Catholics.

== Bibliography ==
- Guérin, V. (1880). Description Géographique Historique et Archéologique de la Palestine (in French). Vol. 3: Galilee, pt. 2. Paris: L'Imprimerie Nationale.
