= Serjbel =

Serjbel سيرجبيل Sirjbel
- Village
- Location in Lebanon
- Coordinates: 33°41′03″N 35°30′47″E
- Country: Lebanon
- Governorate: Mount Lebanon
- District: Chouf
- Elevation: 1,180 ft (360 m)
- Time zone: UTC+2 (EET)
  - Summer (DST): +3

Serjbel (Levantine Arabic: سرجبال, romanized: Serjbēl) is a small Lebanese village in the Chouf District of the Mount Lebanon Governorate in Lebanon.
