= Bqerzla =

Town in Akkar District, Lebanon

Bqerzala https://www.bqerzala.com/
- بقرزلا
- Location within Lebanon
- Coordinates: 34°30′37″N 36°03′20″E
- Country: Lebanon
- Governorate: Akkar
- District: Akkar

Area
  - Total: 8.18 km^{2} (3.16 sq mi)
- Elevation: 280 m (920 ft)

Population (2009)
  - Total: 2,608 eligible voters
  - Density: 319/km^{2} (826/sq mi)
- Time zone: UTC+2 (EET)
  - Summer (DST): UTC+3 (EEST)
- Dialing code: +961

Bqerzala (Levantine Arabic: بقرزلا, romanized: Bqerzalā) is a town in Akkar Governorate, Lebanon.

The residents are primarily Maronite Christians.

== History ==
Bqarzla is one of the oldest Christian villages in Akkar. Its name goes back to Syriac and it was known as Beit Qarzal.

In 1838, Eli Smith noted the place as Mukurzela, located west of esh-Sheikh Mohammed. The inhabitants were Maronites.

== Bibliography ==
- Robinson, E.; Smith, E. (1841). Biblical Researches in Palestine, Mount Sinai and Arabia Petraea: A Journal of Travels in the year 1838. Vol. 3. Boston: Crocker & Brewster.
