= Nabi Osman =

Village in Baalbek-Hermel, Lebanon

Coordinates: 34.2128°N 36.3662°E

Nabi Osman (Arabic: النبي عثمان, romanized: an-Nabī ʿUthmān) is a village in Baalbek District, Lebanon. It is located in the northern part of the Bekaa Valley, on the lower slopes of the Anti-Lebanon mountain range, and lies on the highway linking Lebanon and Syria. The town is home to a public school and The Malik Wehbe library.

== Geography and agriculture ==
The altitude of this village ranges from 950 to 1300 meters above sea level. The village is 123km away from Beirut situated between the towns of Al Ain and Labweh. Its economy is restricted to agriculture (figs, olives, apples, pomegranate, apricots, peach and grapes). The Orontes River rises in the springs of Laboue and flows through the lower parts of the village. The village also has game birds for hunting.

== Climate ==
Winters in Nabi Osman are cold and dry, with temperatures seldom reaching freezing point. On average, it snows 3-5 times per season. Summers are very hot and dry, with temperatures reaching no more than 40 °C. The average annual rainfall is 230 mm (9 in).

== Rocket attacks and bombings ==
On the night of 16 March 2014, two people were killed and 16 were wounded as a result of a terrorist suicide attack in Nabi Osman. This followed a series of rocket projectile attacks launched from the Syrian territory. It also suffered bombings in 2017.

== Demographics ==
As of 2006 the village had approximately 1,500 residents. Due to economic problems and the Lebanese war, a large number of the population has emigrated to Australia, Italy, the Gulf States, the United Kingdom and West Africa. Unlike most of the villages in Northern Bekaa, most of the residents are secularist and support the Syrian Social Nationalist Party.
