= Haret Jandal =

Haret Jandal Harat Jandal
- Location in Lebanon
- Coordinates: 33°37′29″N 35°36′29″E
- Country: Lebanon
- Governorate: Mount Lebanon
- District: Chouf

Haret Jandal is a municipality in the Chouf District of Lebanon. It is 850 meters above sea level. Its inhabitants are predominantly Druze.
