= Fakiha =

Fakiha فاكهة Fakeha, Fekeheh
- Village
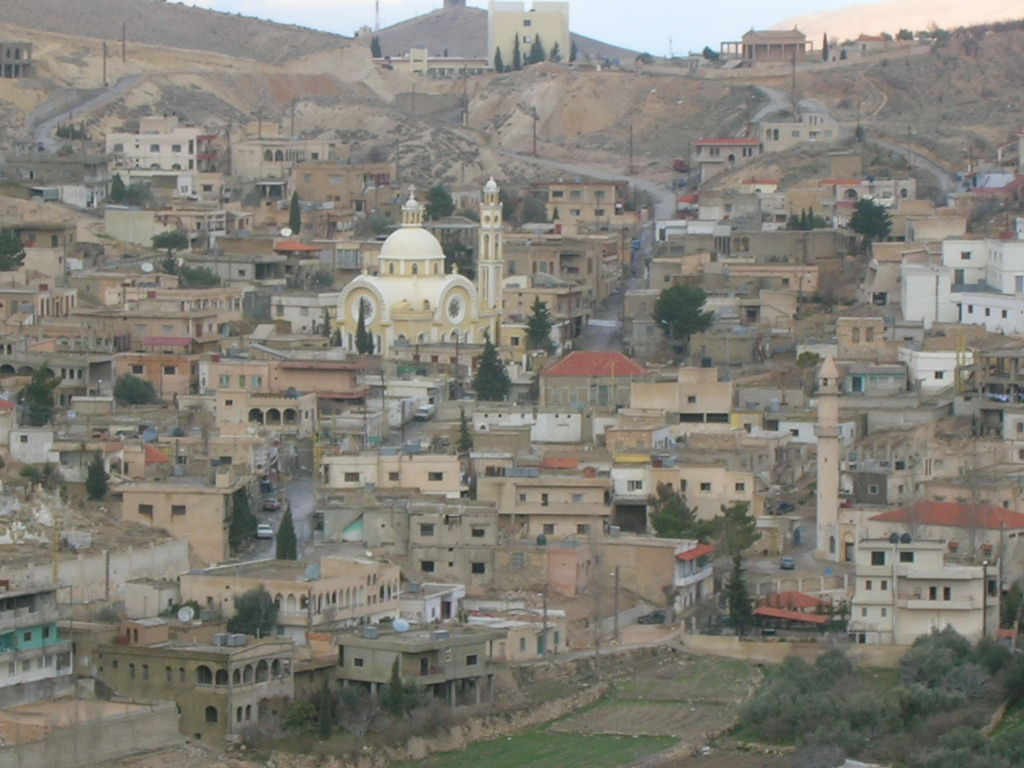
- Fekeheh

- Location in Lebanon
- Coordinates: 34°14′44″N 36°24′21″E
- Country: Lebanon
- Governorate: Baalbek-Hermel Governorate
- District: Baalbek District
- Time zone: UTC+2 (EET)
  - Summer (DST): +3

Fakiha (Arabic: فاكهة), also romanized Fakeha or Fekeheh, is a village in the Baalbek District of Baalbek-Hermel Governorate, Lebanon.
