= Gharifeh =

Gharifeh غريفة
- Municipality
- Location in Lebanon
- Coordinates: 33°38′19″N 35°33′13″E
- Country: Lebanon
- Governorate: Mount Lebanon
- District: Chouf
- Time zone: UTC+2 (EET)
  - Summer (DST): UTC+3 (EEST)
- Dialing code: +961

Gharifeh (Arabic: غريفة) is a village in the Chouf District of Lebanon.

== History ==
There are many legends about the origin of the name of Gharifeh. It may come from Syriac, and means "cliff" or "extended mountains."

== Location ==
Gharifeh's elevation is 800 metres above sea level. It is 56 kilometers away from the capital of Lebanon, Beyrouth, and 8 kilometers from Beit ed-Dine, the administrative center of the Kaza.

There are 8,260 residents in Gharifeh. In the last municipal Lebanese elections of 2005, Gharifeh counted 5,491 registered voters, 3,157 of which actually voted. Gharifeh has an elected municipal assembly. Gharifeh has two schools, one public school and one private school.

The village of Gharifeh is located in the Kaza of Chouf, one of the six Kazas of the Mount-Lebanon mohafazah. The mohafazah of Mount-Lebanon is one of the eight Lebanon mohafazats. The village is surrounded by high mountains and virgin forests. The town is famous for its olive oil, which comes from olive trees dating from Roman times. There are many archaeological objects in Gharifeh, such as a bridge linking the Chouf to Iqlim el Kharroub, stone mills, and ancient Roman jars.

== Demography ==
The families of Gharifeh include: Harb, Ghandour, Abou Nasr, Haddad, Arslan, Wahab, Zeineddine, Nasreddine, Abou Hamdan, Hamadeh, Monzer, Hamzeh, Khoury, Rahal, Shams
