= Mhaydseh =

Mhaiydseh محيدثة
- Village
- Location in Lebanon
- Coordinates: 33°33′22″N 35°48′46″E
- Country: Lebanon
- Governorate: Beqaa Governorate
- District: Rashaya District
- Elevation: 3,740 ft (1,140 m)

Mhaydseh (Levantine Arabic: محيدثة, romanized: Mḥaydseh), Bekaa Valley, Lebanon (sometimes pronounced plainly as "Al Mhaydseh","Muhaydhi") (Arabic: المحيدثة) is a town in the south-eastern portion of the Bekaa, a governorate of the Republic of Lebanon. Mhaydseh is part of the Rashaya District.

== History ==
In 1838, Eli Smith noted it as el-Muheiditheh; a Sunni Muslim village in the Beqaa Valley.

== Bibliography ==
- Robinson, E.; Smith, E. (1841). Biblical Researches in Palestine, Mount Sinai and Arabia Petraea: A Journal of Travels in the year 1838. Vol. 3. Boston: Crocker & Brewster.
