= Bakifa =

Bakkifa بكّيفا Bakifa
- Village
- Location in Lebanon
- Coordinates: 33°29′39″N 35°49′11″E
- Country: Lebanon
- Governorate: Beqaa Governorate
- District: Rashaya District
- Elevation: 3,166 ft (965 m)

Bakifa, (Arabic: بكّيفا, romanized: Bakkīfā), is a local authority situated in Rashaya District, Lebanon.

== History ==
In 1838, Eli Smith noted Bekiyifeh's population as being Druze and "Greek" Christians.

== Bibliography ==
- Robinson, E.; Smith, E. (1841). Biblical Researches in Palestine, Mount Sinai and Arabia Petraea: A Journal of Travels in the year 1838. Vol. 3. Boston: Crocker & Brewster.
