= Miniyeh =

Capital of the Miniyeh-Danniyeh District in the North Governorate of Lebanon

Miniyeh المنية
- Location within Lebanon
- Coordinates: 34°27′55″N 35°56′16″E
- Country: Lebanon
- Governorate: North Governorate
- Districts of Lebanon: Miniyeh-Danniyeh District

Government
  - Mayor: Toufic Zreika

Population
  - Total: 20,680
- Time zone: +2
  - Summer (DST): +3
- Website: http://www.mymenieh.com/

Miniyeh or Minya (Arabic: المنية) is the capital of the Miniyeh-Danniyeh District in North Governorate of Lebanon. Minya is located 96 km from Beirut at an altitude of 20 m above sea level.

== History ==
Following the Battle of Sannine, on March 635 the Battle of Miniyeh took place between the Arab armies of the Rashidun Caliphate and the remaining forces of Legio IV Fidelis. The battle was part of the Muslim conquest of the Levant. The outcome of the battle was an annihilation of the Byzantine empire forces and removing their threat on Tyre.

== Demographics ==
Religion in Miniyeh (2014)
Religion	Percent
Sunni Islam	89.91%
Shia Islam	0.30%
Christian	9.53%
Others	0.26%

In 2014, Muslims made up 90.27% and Christians made up 9.53% of registered voters in Miniyeh. 89.91% of the voters were Sunni Muslims and 7.21% were Greek Orthodox.

== Notable people ==
- Mostafa Matar (born 1995), Lebanese footballer
