= Beino-Qboula =

Beino - Qboula بينو - قبولا
- village
- Location within Lebanon
- Coordinates: 34°32′03″N 36°10′51″E
- Country: Lebanon
- Governorate: Akkar
- District: Akkar

Area
  - Total: 9.61 km^{2} (3.71 sq mi)
- Elevation: 520 m (1,710 ft)
- Time zone: UTC+2 (EET)
  - Summer (DST): UTC+3 (EEST)
- Dialing code: +961

Beino - Qboula (Levantine Arabic: بينو - قبولا, romanized: Beynō - Qbūlā) is an area in the Akkar district in Lebanon. Beino has a total area of around 20 Square kilometers with a population of about 2,500. The area was featured in the second season of the Lebanese comedy series Marhaba Dawle.

== History ==
In 1838, Eli Smith noted the villages as Binu and Kubula, located west of esh-Sheikh Mohammed. The inhabitants in both villages were Greek Orthodox Christians.

In 2009 there were 2,965 eligible voters in Beino, and 384 in Qboula. The population in Qboula were all Greek Orthodox Christians, while the population of Beino were Greek Orthodox "and other confessions".

== Notable persons ==
- Edward Atiyah
- Issam Fares

== Bibliography ==
- Robinson, E.; Smith, E. (1841). Biblical Researches in Palestine, Mount Sinai and Arabia Petraea: A Journal of Travels in the year 1838. Vol. 3. Boston: Crocker & Brewster.
