= Kasser =

Kasser is a surname. Notable people with the surname include:

- Alexandra Kasser (born 1967), American attorney and politician
- Elsbeth Kasser (1910–1992), Swiss nurse
- Raymond H. Kasser (1925-1991), American distiller
- Rodolphe Kasser (1927–2013), Swiss philologist, archaeologist, and scholar
- Tim Kasser (born 1966), American psychologist
