= Majdel Meouch =

Majdel Meouch مجدل معوش

Population (2015)
  - Total: 3,089

Majdel Meouch (Arabic: مجدل معوش) is a municipality in Chouf District, Lebanon. It has a population of 3,089 as of 2015.

== History ==
On 7 September 1983, 63 Lebanese Christians were killed by the People's Liberation Army during the Mountain War.
