= José Achache =

Swiss businessman

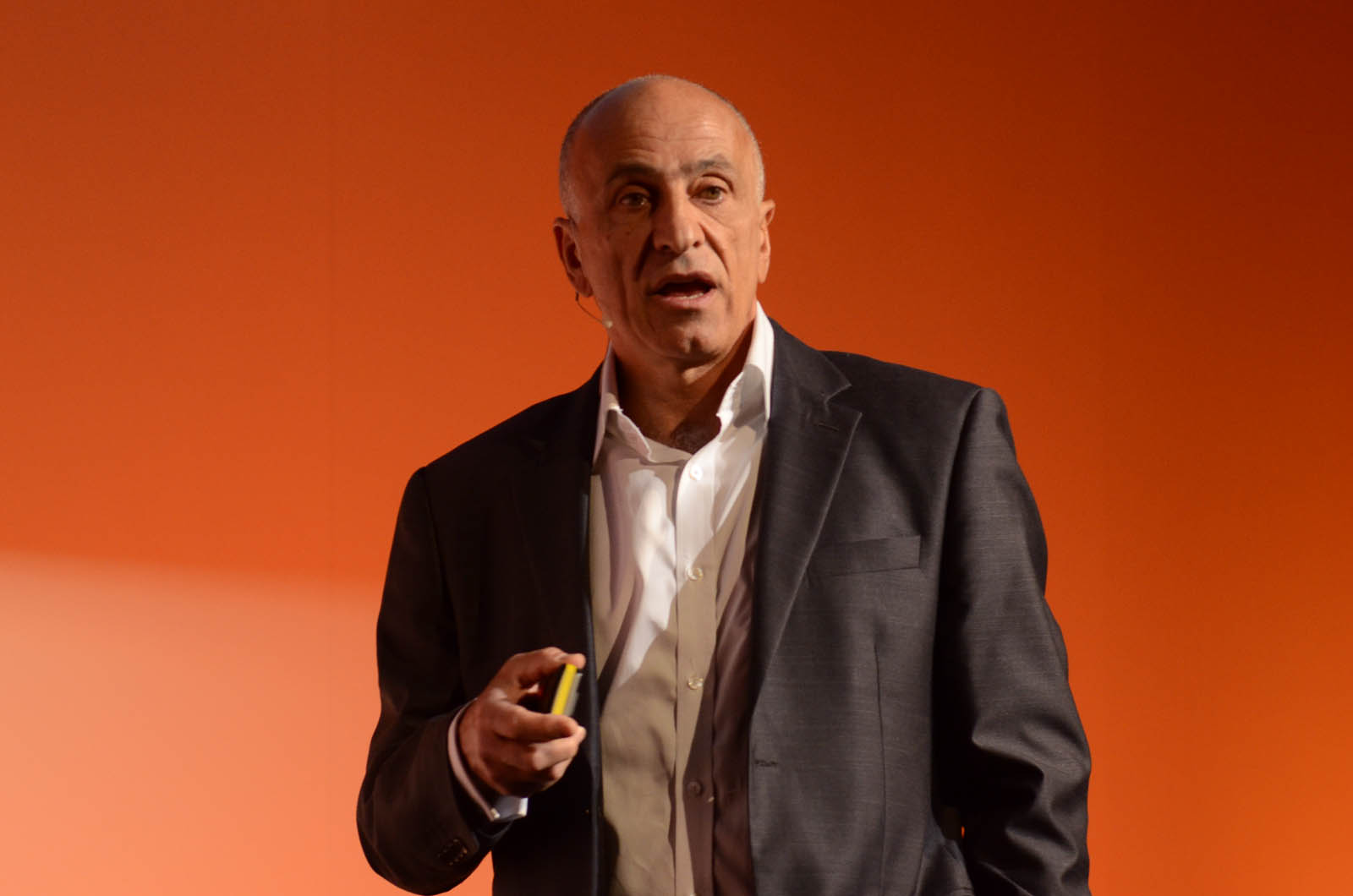
José Achache, 2014

José Achache is founder and CEO of ALTYN, a Swiss company in space and commercial applications of satellites. After 17 years in academia as professor of geophysics at the Institut de Physique du Globe de Paris, followed by 17 years as an executive in French then international research and development organizations in environment and space (Bureau de Recherches Géologiques et Minières, Centre national d'études spatiales, European Space Agency, Group on Earth Observations), Achache is now developing technologies for satellites (optical systems for observation and telecommunication, image compression, cybersecurity) as well as applications of space on Earth (global IoT, Earth observation and environmental intelligence). He participates in ESA BIC CH, a joint programme of ESA and the Swiss Space Office, which supports space startups and fosters the development of commercial applications and services powered by satellites.

Achache has been the architect of the Copernicus Programme of the European Union and its Sentinel series of satellites and the early advocate of its free and open data policy. He is the author of "Les Sentinelles de la Terre", an essay on space policy and the applications of space on Earth. He has published numerous scientific papers as well as editorial, interviews and conferences for wider audiences on space and environmental issues.

He is co-founder and director of Groupe Plani, a Paris-based company providing end-to-end equipment and services for video and TV production, chairman of ILTOO Pharma, a biotech company developing new treatments for autoimmune and inflammatory diseases, and director of Suzette Gourmet Private Ltd, an organic food brand based in Mumbai, India.

== Education and experience ==
A graduate of the Ecole Normale Supérieure in Paris, he holds a PhD in geophysics from the Université Pierre et Marie Curie, a PhD in physical sciences from the Université Denis Diderot and was a postdoctoral fellow at Stanford University.

He has been professor at the Institut de Physique du Globe de Paris, chief scientist at the French Geological Survey BRGM, deputy director general of the French space agency CNES, director of Earth Observation Programmes at the European Space Agency ESA and the first secretary general of the Group on Earth Observations when the Global Earth Observation System of Systems was established in Geneva.
