= Kfarhata =

Village in Koura District, Lebanon

Kfarhata كفرحاتا
- Village
- Location within Lebanon
- Coordinates: 34°17′0″N 35°45′0″E
- Country: Lebanon
- Governorate: North Governorate
- District: Koura District
- Elevation: 170 m (560 ft)
- Time zone: UTC+2 (EET)
  - Summer (DST): UTC+3 (EEST)
- Dialing code: +961

Kfarhata (Arabic: كفرحاتا, romanized: Kfar Ḥātā), also known as Kfar Hata or Kafrhata, is a village located in the Koura District, in the North Governorate of Lebanon. It is one of the 52 towns of El-Koura, situated at the southern region of this district, at the other side of Al-Kateh (The cutter), a shallow but wide valley, separating a group of six towns from the gigantic El-Koura olive plains. In 1953, Kfarhata had a population of 590 living in 64 households.

== Demographics ==
In 2014, Christians made up 97.84% of registered voters in Kfarhata. 77.53% of the voters were Greek Orthodox and 18.25% were Maronite Catholics.

== Landscape ==
Notwithstanding the mountainous profile of this town, olive trees cultivation is successful, with olive oil, extracted using the traditional Koranian cold technique.

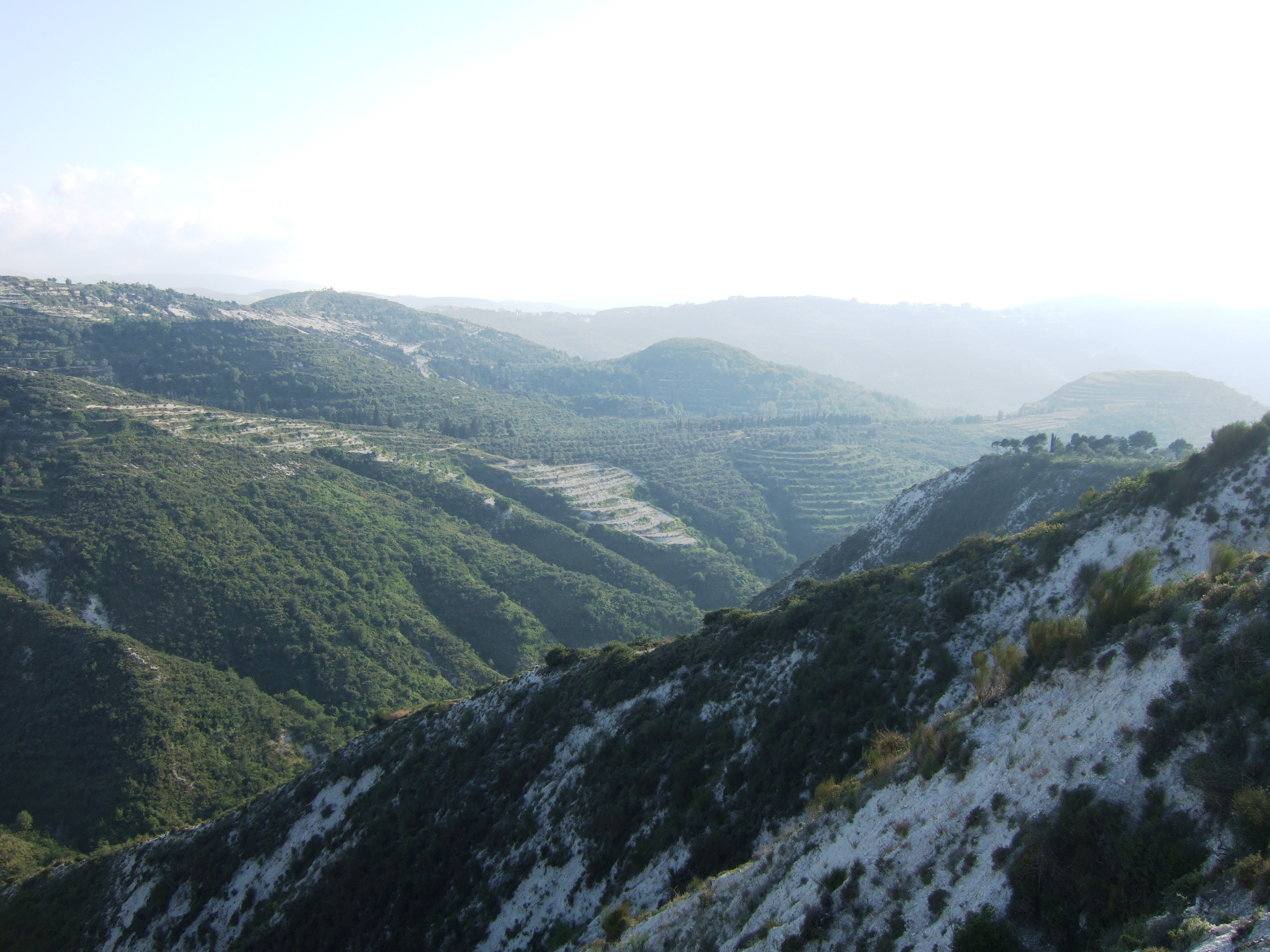
El-Koura "Cutter" (Western view)

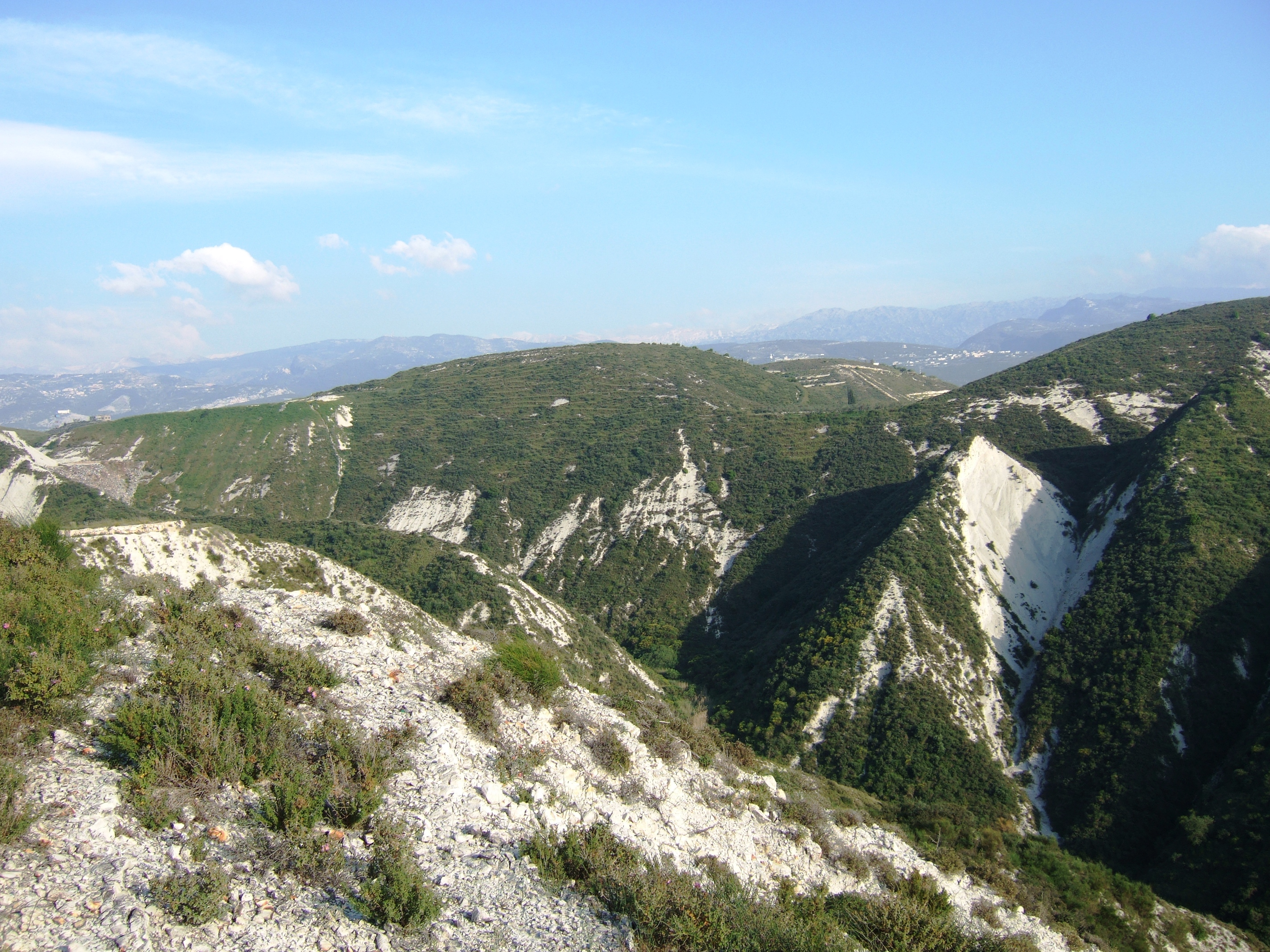
El-Koura "Cutter" (Eastern view)

== See also ==
- Amioun
- Koura District
