= El Foûâra =

Coordinates: 33°43′N 35°38′E

El Foûâra is a municipality in the Chouf District of the state of the Mont-Liban, Lebanon.
