= Kfertay =

Kfartay (or Kfertay) is a town in Matn District in Lebanon. Also "Kfartay" is another town located in Keserwan District

== Etymology ==
There are two likely theories for the origin of the word Kfertay:

- It is a compound word, where "Kfer" means " a town" and "tay" means "the miserable" and thus it implies "the town of the miserable".
- The second part might have stemmed from the word "tay", a Bedwin Aramaic tribe that might have lived in the town at some point. Lebanon is home to two Kfertay towns, one in Matn and another in Kessrouan.

== Location ==
Kfertay is located in the Mount Lebanon Mohafaza at an altitude of 1200 m above the sea level. It lies east of the Mediterranean Sea and 45 km from Beirut and spreads across 300 hectares. The coordinates of this town are 33.9271° N, 35.5864° E.

== Economic activities ==
At first, Kfertay's residents used to rely on agriculture but soon shifted to commerce and free professions or held jobs in both public and private sectors, which resulted in neglected land. In the past few years, Kfertay attracted scores of Khalijis who bought property and built homes, thus stirring momentum in the town.

The number of registered inhabitants in the town's personal status register is estimated at 800 people belonging to the Greek Catholic and Maronite community. Kfertay includes 80 houses and 5 commercial shops.

== Education ==
There are no schools in Kfertay and its students are educated in neighboring towns.

== Archaeological sites ==
The town includes stone tombs and sarcophagi from the Ancient Roman era with engraved inscriptions.
