= Dinniyeh =

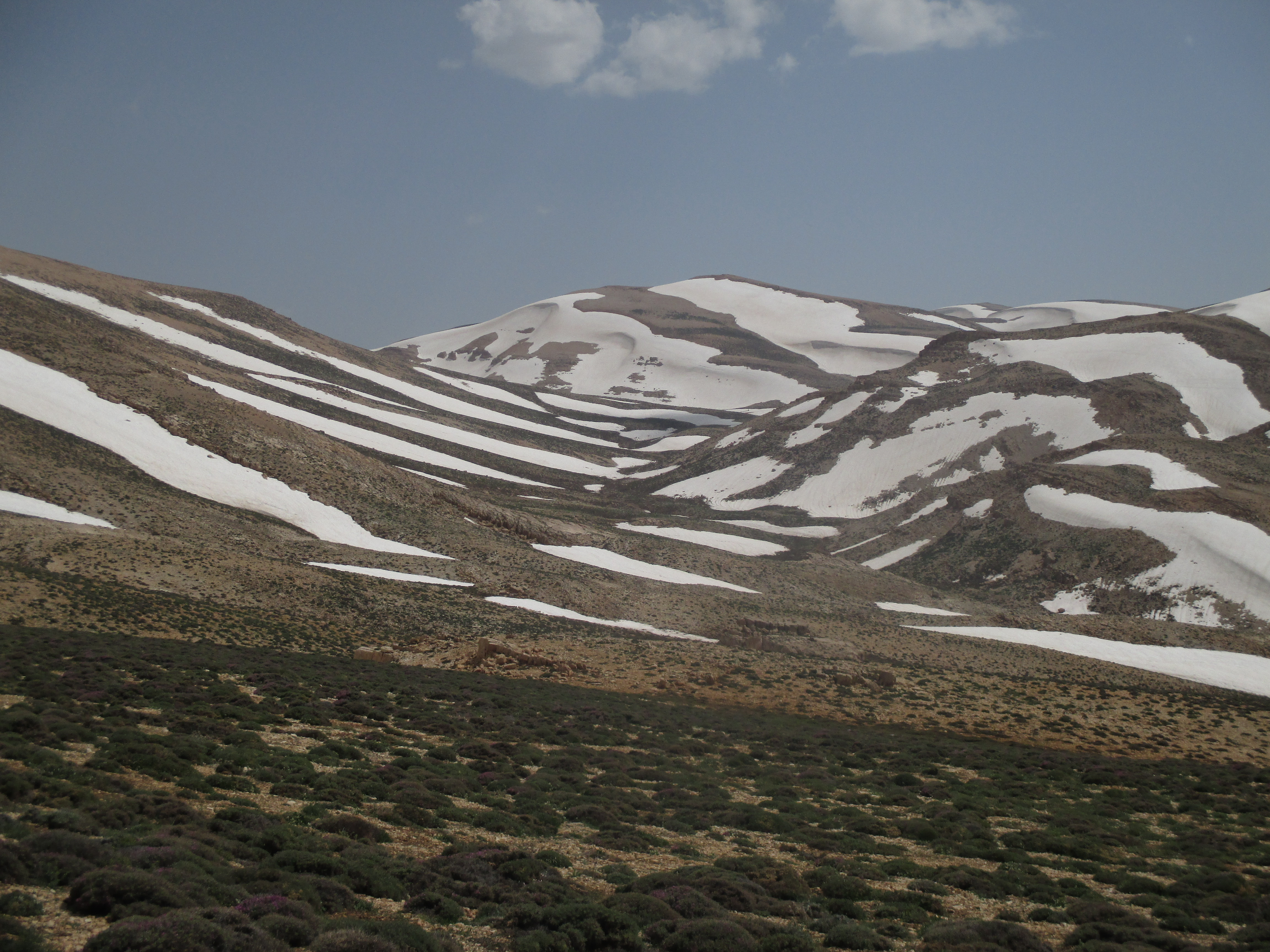
Dannieh near moustaasi terrain

Danniyeh (known also as Addinniyeh, Al Dinniyeh, Al Danniyeh, Arabic: الضنية) is a region located in Miniyeh-Danniyeh District in the North Governorate of Lebanon. The region lies east of Tripoli, extends north as far as Akkar District, south to Bsharri District and Zgharta District and as far east as Baalbek and Hermel. Dinniyeh has an excellent ecological environment filled with woodlands, orchards and groves. Several villages are located in this mountainous area, the largest town being Sir Al Dinniyeh. Its inhabitants are mainly Sunni Muslims.
