= Miniyeh–Danniyeh District =

Miniyeh-Danniyeh District
- District
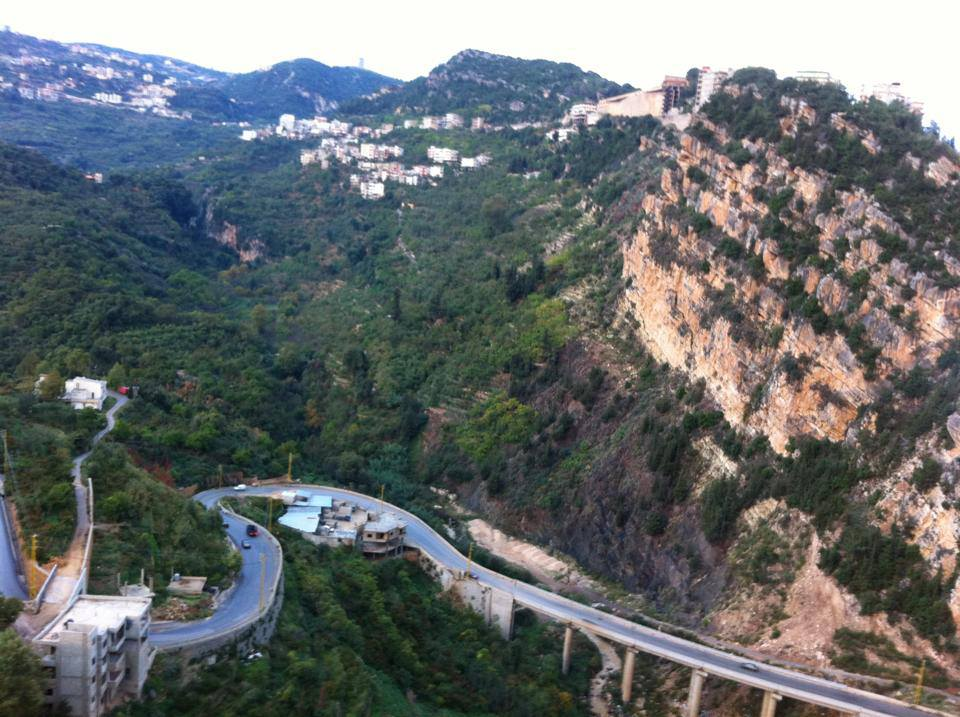

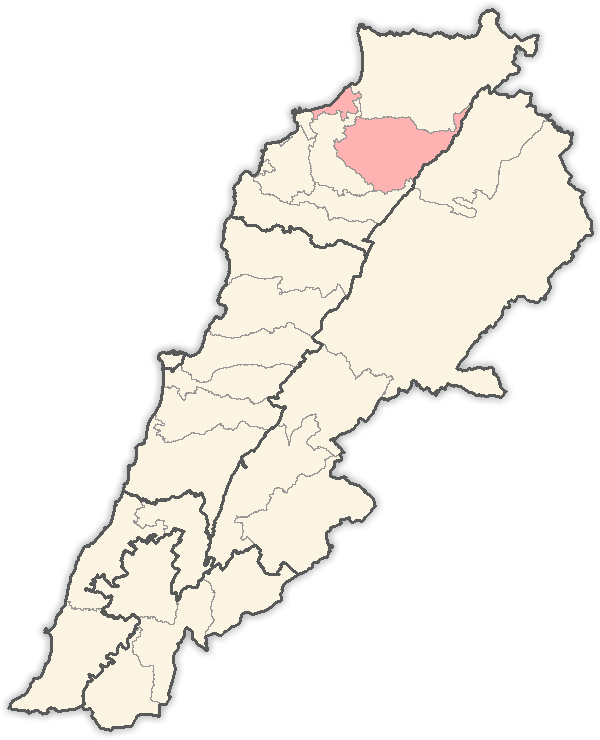
- Location in Lebanon
- Coordinates: 34.4653°N 35.9378°E
- Country: Lebanon
- Governorate: North Governorate
- Capital: Miniyeh

Area
  - Total: 158 sq mi (409 km^{2})

Population
  - Estimate (31 December 2017): 206,075
- Time zone: UTC+2 (EET)
  - Summer (DST): UTC+3 (EEST)

Miniyeh-Danniyeh District is a district in the North Governorate of Lebanon. As its name indicates, the district includes the Dinniyeh, and the Miniyeh regions. The town of Miniyeh serves as district a capital during fall and winter, while the town of Syr Dinniyeh serves as a capital during spring and summer. The district is known for its natural richness. It extends over the northern and western hills of Al-Makmel mountain overlooking the Northern Lebanese and Syrian Coasts.

== Demographics ==
According to registered voters in 2014:

Year	Christians				Muslims				Druze
Year	Total	Greek Orthodox	Maronites	Other Christians	Total	Sunnis	Shias	Alawites	Druze
2014	13.90%	7.14%	6.49%	0.27%	85.75%	85.42%	0.27%	0.06%	0.00%
2018	13.76%	6.89%	6.28%	0.59%	86.25%	85.93%	0.26%	0.06%	0.00%
2022	15.94%	7.66%	7.04%	1.24%	84.06%	83.76%	0.25%	0.05%	0.00%
2026	13.32%	7.19%	5.83%	0.29%	86.68%	86.68%	0.00%	0.00%	0.00%

Number of registered voters (21+ years old) over the years.

Years	Men	Women	Total	Growth (%)
2009	48,504	48,848	97,352	—N/a
2010	49,611 ▲	50,034 ▲	99,645 ▲	+2.30% ▲
2011	50,758 ▲	51,360 ▲	102,118 ▲	+2.42% ▲
2012	51,928 ▲	52,585 ▲	104,513 ▲	+2.29% ▼
2013	53,491 ▲	53,761 ▲	107,252 ▲	+2.55% ▲
2014	54,809 ▲	55,195 ▲	110,004 ▲	+2.50% ▼
2015	56,062 ▲	56,668 ▲	112,730 ▲	+2.42% ▼
2016	57,308 ▲	58,355 ▲	115,663 ▲	+2.54% ▲
2017	54,525 ▼	55,579 ▼	110,104 ▼	-5.05% ▼
2018	55,946 ▲	56,868 ▲	112,814 ▲	+2.40% ▲
2019	57,356 ▲	58,074 ▲	115,430 ▲	+2.27% ▼
2020	58,702 ▲	59,172 ▲	117,874 ▲	+2.07% ▼
2021	59,903 ▲	60,118 ▲	120,021 ▲	+1.79% ▼
2022	61,317 ▲	61,356 ▲	122,673 ▲	+2.16% ▲
2023	62,410 ▲	62,389 ▲	124,799 ▲	+1.70% ▼
2024	63,947 ▲	63,656 ▲	127,603 ▲	+2.20% ▲
2025	65,288 ▲	64,898 ▲	130,186 ▲	+1.98% ▼
2026	—N/a	—N/a	132,846 ▲	+2.00% ▲
Source: DGCS
