= Baalbek District =

Coordinates: 34°00′25″N 36°12′14″E

- District
- قضاء بعلبك
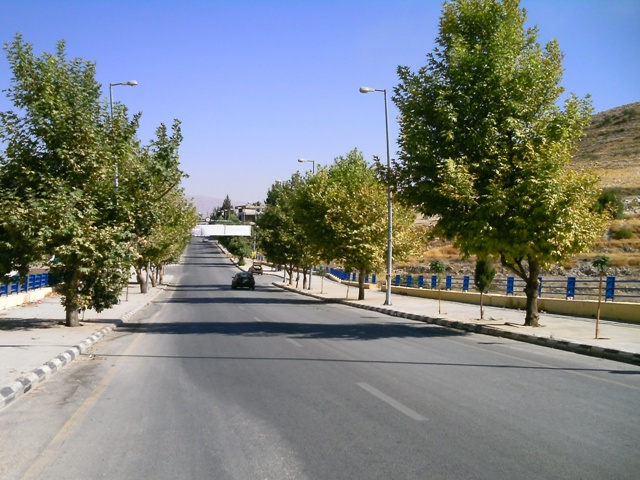
- Shmistar, Baalbek District

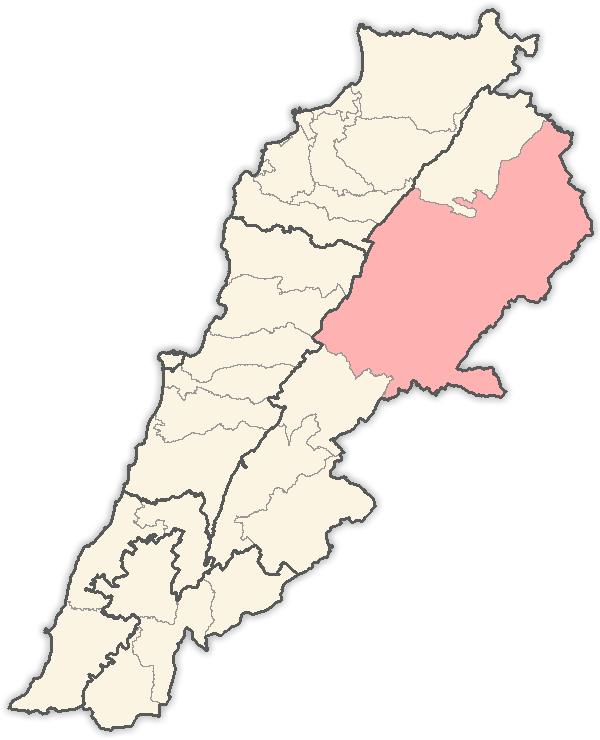
- Location in Lebanon
- Country: Lebanon
- Governorate: Baalbek-Hermel Governorate
- Capital: Baalbek

Area
  - Total: 2,319 km^{2} (895 sq mi)

Population
  - Estimate (31 December 2017): 387,935
- Time zone: UTC+2 (EET)
  - Summer (DST): UTC+3 (EEST)

Baalbek District (Arabic: قضاء بعلبك) is an administrative district in the Baalbek-Hermel Governorate of the Republic of Lebanon, having the city Baalbek as its capital. It is by far the largest district in the country comprising a total of 2,319 km^{2} (895 sq mi).

Major towns of the district are Hallanieh, Temnin el Fawka, Chmestar, Duris, Jdeide, Kasarnaba and Bodai

== Demographics ==
According to registered voters in 2014:

Year	Christians					Muslims				Druze
Year	Total	Maronites	Greek Catholics	Greek Orthodox	Other Christians	Total	Shias	Sunnis	Alawites	Druze
2014	16.26%	8.76%	6.13%	1.09%	0.28%	83.31%	67.11%	16.19%	0.01%	0.01%
