= Districts of Lebanon =

Lebanon's administrative partitioning

The nine governorates of Lebanon are subdivided into 26 districts (Aqdya, singular – qadaa). Beirut Governorate is not subdivided into districts, and Akkar Governorate comprises a single district.

The districts are further divided into municipalities.

== List of districts ==
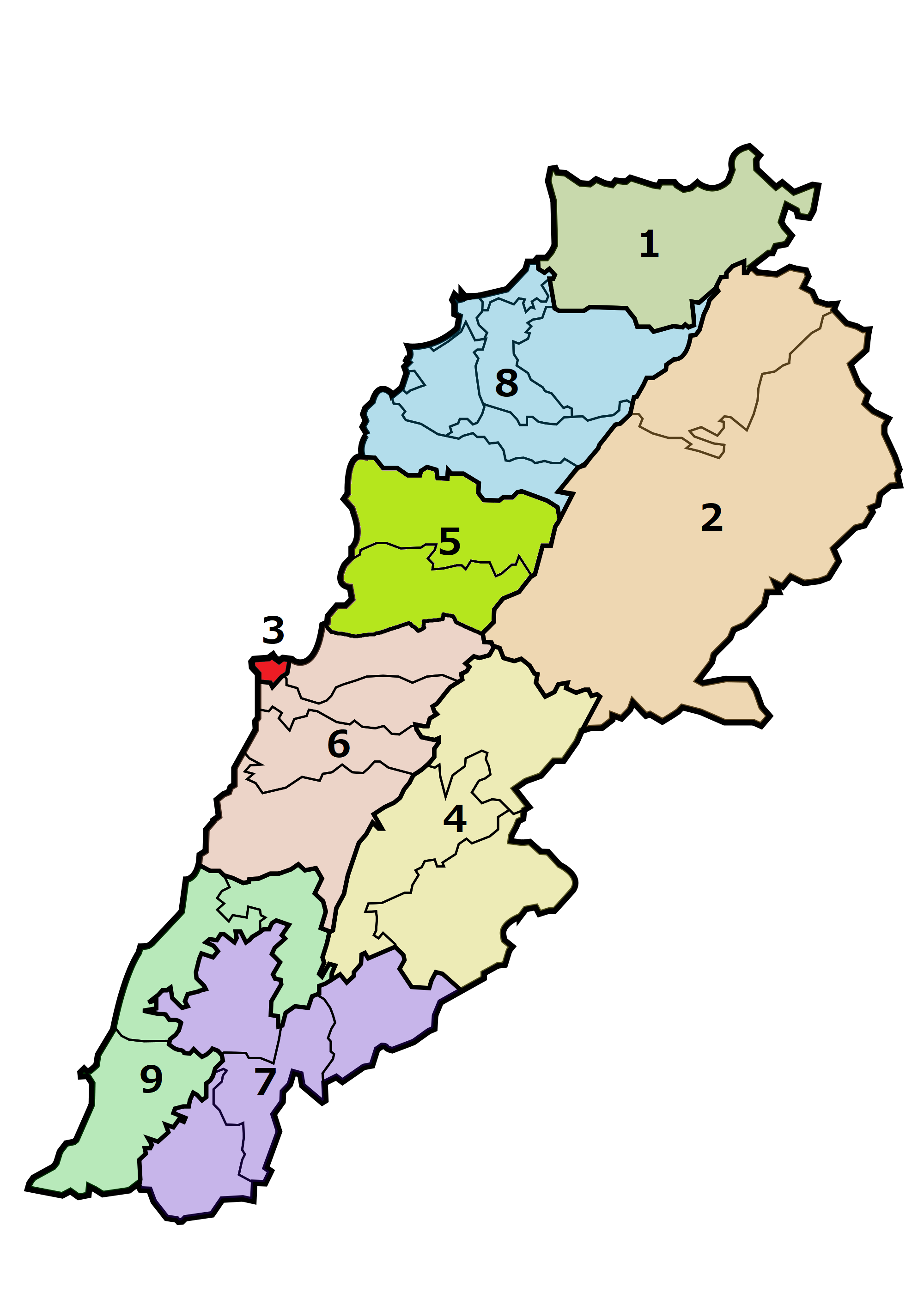
The governorates (numbered according to the list below) and districts of Lebanon.

Capitals (مراكز) of the governorates and districts are indicated in parentheses.

1. Akkar Governorate (Halba)
  - Akkar (Halba)
2. Baalbek-Hermel Governorate (Baalbek)
  - Baalbek (Baalbek)
  - Hermel (Hermel)
3. Beirut Governorate (Beirut)
4. Beqaa Governorate (Zahlé)
  - Rashaya (Rashaya)
  - Western Beqaa (Joub Jannine - winter / Saghbine - summer)
  - Zahlé (Zahlé)
5. Keserwan-Jbeil Governorate (Jounieh)
  - Byblos (Byblos)
  - Keserwan (Jounieh)
6. Mount Lebanon Governorate (Baabda)
  - Aley (Aley)
  - Baabda (Baabda)
  - Chouf (Beiteddine)
  - Matn/Metn (Jdeideh)
7. Nabatieh Governorate (Nabatieh)
  - Bint Jbeil (Bint Jbeil)
  - Hasbaya (Hasbaya)
  - Marjeyoun (Marjeyoun)
  - Nabatieh (Nabatieh)
8. North Governorate (Tripoli)
  - Batroun (Batroun)
  - Bsharri (Bsharri)
  - Koura (Amioun)
  - Miniyeh-Danniyeh District (Miniyeh)
  - Tripoli (Tripoli)
  - Zgharta (Zgharta)
9. South Governorate (Sidon)
  - Sidon (Sidon)
  - Jezzine (Jezzine)
  - Tyre (Tyre)
