= Najjariyeh =

Village in South Governorate, Lebanon

Najjariyeh النجارية
- Municipality
- Location in Lebanon
- Coordinates: 33°28′24″N 35°20′55″E
- Country: Lebanon
- Governorate: South Governorate
- District: Sidon District
- Time zone: UTC+2 (EET)
  - Summer (DST): UTC+3 (EEST)

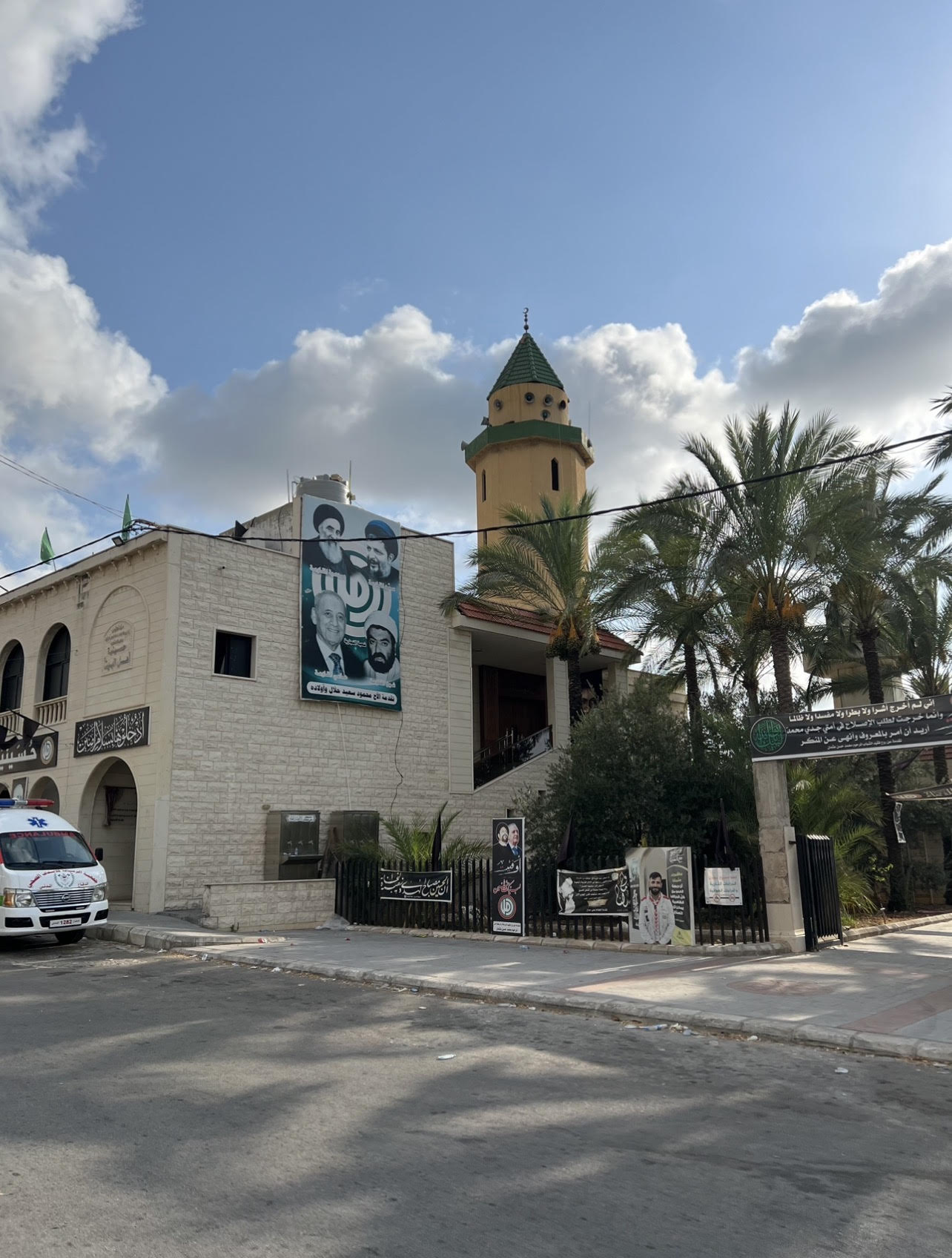
Hussainiya of Najjariyeh.

Najjariyeh (Arabic: النجارية, romanized: an-Najjāriyah) also known as Al-Zahrani in the Iqlim Al-Shoumar area of the greater Jabal Amil region of Lebanon, is a municipality in the Sidon District of the South Governorate. The Zahrani River reaches the Mediterranean Sea at Najjariyah and forms the boundary with the town of Ghazieh to the north. The village extends inland from the mouth of the Zahrani River to the Hajjeh Valley. It borders the municipalities and villages of Al-Ghaziyah, Al-Aaddoussiyah, Al-Marwaniyah, Al-Maamriyah, and Hajjeh. The village administers three hamlets: Msayleh, Kherbet Basal and Brak Ez-Zahrani. What is also strategic about the municipality that it is located between three major cities which are, Sidon, Nabatieh and Tyre. The village contains The Coastal Highway that connects the two cities of Sidon and Tyre, and also contains a major road connecting the cities of Nabatieh and Sidon. The Municipality also includes the Zahrani Bridge that connects the Zahrani Region and The Sidon District together. The village's highest elevation is located in the Mazraat As-Saknouniyah area, south of the village's main settlement. Situated inland, the peak rises to approximately 830 feet (253 metres) above sea level. The peak overlooks several surrounding settlements and villages, including Al-Ghaziyah, Hajjeh, Qennarit, the city of Sidon, and As-Sarafand, with views extending across the wider Zahrani region of southern Lebanon.

The village's population is predominantly Shiite Muslim, while most Sunni Muslims live in a separate neighborhood known as Hayy al-Arab, meaning "Arab Quarter". Most Sunni Muslims in Najjariyeh are Lebanese Bedouin Arabs, some of whom live in the Msayleh area of the municipality. The municipality has two mosques, one Sunni and one Shiite, with the Shiite mosque regarded as the main mosque. The municipality's main husayniyya, a building used for Shia religious practice, is the Husayniyya of Ahlul Bayt Alayhuma al-Salam, which is also a stronghold of the Amal movement and the Islamic Risala Scout Association.

The municipality includes the Hajjeh Valley, where a cultural complex belonging to Nabih Berri is located. Najjariyeh also has a monument in the Zahrani area near Al-Ghaziyah, by the Zahrani River, erected by the Amal movement in memory of Bilal Fahes, one of its members, who carried out a suicide bomb attack against an Israeli convoy there in 1987.

== History ==
In 1875, in the late Ottoman era, Victor Guérin described it: "Nedjarieh [...] is a fairly considerable farm, worked by Maronites, Metawilehs, and "schismatic Greeks", and which has replaced an ancient agricultural establishment, as is proved by cisterns and presses hewn in the rock. Fig, olive and mulberry trees surround it."

Known by the residents of the village, It was known that Islamic prophet Khidr has passed and stayed in the area, which is modern day Najjariyah. A shrine was built onto the place he stayed in. It was also historically known that during the exile of Abu Dharr al-Ghifari to Jabal Amil or modern day Southern Lebanon due to the disagreements with the Umayyads. He has passed by and helped spread Shia Islam within the area Najjariyeh was in. Historical residents then followed the teaching of Abu Dharr al-Ghifari.

== Involvement in Hezbollah-Israel conflict ==
Hezbollah is known for its control and activity within the Village, which lead to the bombing of Hezbollah strongholds in Najjariyeh on may 17th, 2024. This attack was targeted towards Hezbollah senior, “Hussain Khodor Mahdi”, which lead to his death in the attack with two other Syrians. Another Israeli attack also occurred on the hamlet of Msayleh belonging to Najjariyeh on October 11th, 2025. It was an attack on heavy machinery and vehicles, Israel claiming that the machinery all belonged to Hezbollah, though that many Lebanese sources rebuke the claim, saying it was an unlawful attack and a violation of human rights.

On 31 March 2026, during the 2026 Lebanon War, Israeli warplanes targeted a building in the village housing a family of four two brothers and two sisters, all of whom were killed in the strike. The primary target of the attack was senior Hezbollah leader “Abbas Khalil Hallal”, who was later pronounced dead in the aftermath of the strike.

== Families ==
Most families in Najjariyeh consist of Twelver Shiite Muslims. They all live together closely in the hillside of the village. The Major families named are: Tarraf - Hussain - Othman - Hallal - Kawtharani - Kachakech - Mahdi - Mjallal - Abbas - Nasser - Jaber - Issa - Mahmoud - Diab - Zarnaji - Al-Ali - Kassem - Najjar - Ayyad - Khalil - Khalife - Mkhayber - Atwi - Younes - Hijazi - Ramadan - Asaad.

The Hussein family is regarded as the largest family in An-Najjariyah, with deep-rooted origins tracing back to the historic village of Al-Malkiyah in northern Palestine, one of the seven Shia villages of Jabal Amil in northern Palestine.

== Demographics ==
In 2014, Muslims made up 95.61% of registered voters in Najjariyeh. 83.05% of the voters were Shiite Muslims and 12.56% were Sunni Muslims.

== Bibliography ==
- Guérin, V. (1880). Description Géographique Historique et Archéologique de la Palestine (in French). Vol. 3: Galilee, pt. 2. Paris: L'Imprimerie Nationale.

== External links and Resources ==
- Najjariyeh (archive.org), Localiban
