= Ghaziyeh =

Ghaziyeh الغازية
- Municipality
- Location in Lebanon
- Coordinates: 33°31′07″N 35°21′58″E
- Country: Lebanon
- Governorate: South Governorate
- District: Sidon District

Area
  - Total: 15 km^{2} (5.8 sq mi)

Population (2011)
  - Total: 50,000
  - Religion: Shia Islam
- Time zone: UTC+2 (EET)
  - Summer (DST): UTC+3 (EEST)
- Area code: 07
- Website: http://www.ghaziehcity.com

Ghaziyeh (Arabic: الغازية, romanized: al-Ghāziyah) is a municipality in Sidon District, South Governorate, Lebanon, located about 4 kilometres south of Sidon. It covers an area of approximately 15 km².

Ghaziyeh borders several nearby villages, including Qinnarit, Magdouche, Darb es Sim, Zaita, Aaqtanit, Maamriye, and An-Najjariyah.

The town is an important commercial and industrial centre in southern Lebanon and is home to the former Tapline oil refinery. The municipality is also home to Chabab SC Ghazieh, a football club that competes in the Lebanese football league system.

== History ==
Ghaziyeh was named in four waqf documents stored in Jerusalem dating to the first decade of the 14th century, during Mamluk rule (1293–1516). The waqf to which the lands of Ghaziyeh belonged at that time were for the benefit of the Masjid al-Nabawi (Prophet's Mosque) of Medina. The person referenced in the waqf living in Ghaziyeh was a Turkoman, Muhammad ibn Mahmud al-Du'ari, implying he belonged to the Oghuz tribe of Döger.

The Ottoman Empire conquered the region from the Mamluks in 1516. In June 1772, Ghaziyeh was the field of a major battle between the allied forces of Daher al-Umar, the strongman of northern Palestine, and the Metawalis (Twelver Shia Muslim clans) of southern Lebanon against the Ottoman government troops of Damascus. This took place in the aftermath of Sidon's occupation by Daher in October 1771. The government forces were defeated, and the Metawali horsemen "acquitted themselves outstandingly in the field", according to historian Amnon Cohen.

Ghaziyeh suffered from the 1837 earthquake, with 14 houses collapsing and 7 people killed.

=== Modern era ===
During 2006 Lebanon War, on the 7 August, Israeli warplanes bombed and killed a total of 16 civilians in Ghazieh. On the 8 August, Israeli airplanes killed another 10 civilians, in three different incidents.

== Demographics ==
In 2014, Muslims made up 99.58% of registered voters in Al-Ghaziyah. 96.76% of the voters were Shiite Muslims.

== Notable people ==
- Ali El Fadl (born 2003), footballer

== Bibliography ==
- Cohen, Amnon (1973). Palestine in the 18th Century: Patterns of Government and Administration. Jerusalem: The Magnes Press. ISBN 978-0-19-647903-3.
- HRW (2007). Why They Died: Civilian Casualties in Lebanon During the 2006 War. Human Rights Watch.
- Rapoport, Yossef (2025). Becoming Arab: The Formation of Arab Identity in the Medieval Middle East. Princeton: Princeton University Press. ISBN 9780691210636.
