= Jernaya =

Jernaya جرنايا
- Municipality
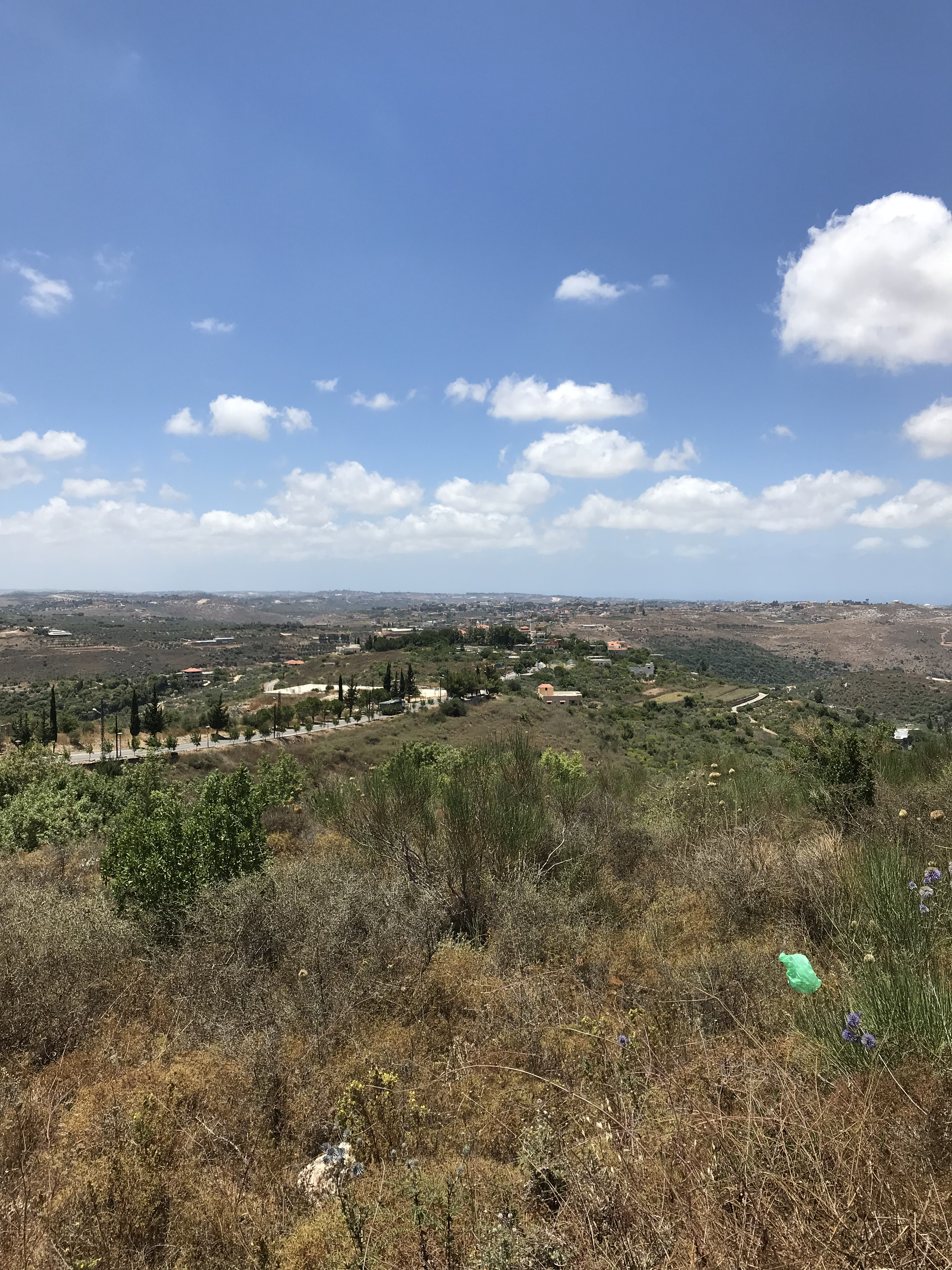

- Location in Lebanon
- Coordinates: 33°29′18″N 35°28′20″E
- Country: Lebanon
- Governorate: Nabatieh Governorate
- District: Nabatieh District

Government
  - Type: Municipality

Area
  - Metro: 2.31 km^{2} (0.89 sq mi)
- Elevation: 460 m (1,510 ft)
- Time zone: UTC+2 (EET)
  - Summer (DST): UTC+3 (EEST)
- Area code: +961-7

Jernaya (Arabic: جرنايا, romanized: Jernāyā) is a municipality located in South Lebanon, on the border between the districts of Jezzine and Nabatiyeh. Its inhabitants are primarily Maronite Catholics.

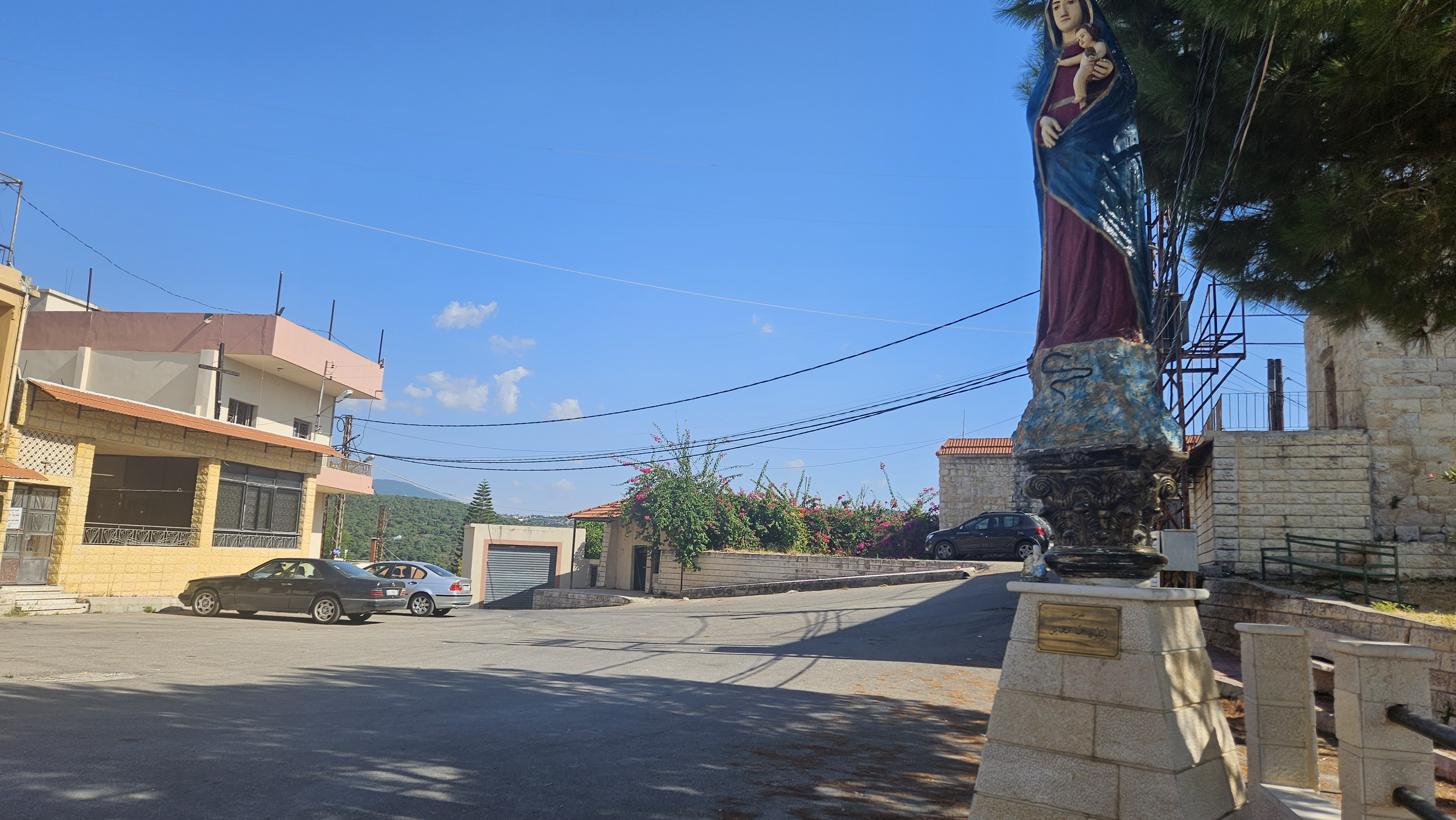
Jernaya village square

== Etymology ==
The name "Jernaya" is a Syriac phrase directly translated as "from the gurnaye". Gurnaye is the plural of gurna: the bark, mortar, and plunge pits in rock.. Its demonym (Arabic: جررناوي), transliterated as Jernaoui.

== Geography ==
Jernaya is located 17 km from Saida, 22 km from jezzine, and 57 km from Beirut. It was formerly administratively part of the caza (Arabic: qada) of Jezzine, then was reassigned to be administered by the Nabatieh District. It is separated by a valley to the South from the Village of Sarba. It has a surface area of 231 hectares.

Jernaya is completely surrounded by Muslim Shia villages, except for the Maronite town of Kfar Chelal and Sarba. It borders the villages of Kfar chelal, Kfar Melki, Sarba and Kfar Fila.

Being 460 m above sea level, Jernaya has a mild Mediterranean mountainous climate (slightly cooler than Saida). On rare occasions, snowfall can occur between the months of December to February, however it usually melts within 24 hours.

The town is fed by drinking water from the Tassi spring project and an artesian well.

== Demographics ==
In 2014, Christians made up 98.88% of registered voters in Jernaya. 88.48% of the voters were Maronite Catholics.

Jernaya's inhabitants are almost exclusively Maronite Catholics, with a Greek Catholic minority. Most villagers only live in Jernaya during the summer, and have jobs in neighboring Saida or Beirut.

As the Lebanese government has not conducted a census since 1932, there is no official data on the population of any Lebanese city. According to the 2017 electoral roll (which only include people aged 21+), there are 1,390 voters:

- 1,358 Maronite Catholics
- 32 Greek Catholics

Families include: khalil, Habib, Abi Najm, Al Hayek, Awad, Al khoury, Abboud, Antoun, and more

== Government ==
Jernaya is a municipality as defined by the Lebanese Ministry of Interior and Municipalities. The government consists of a mukhtar and a municipal council made up of 12 members. The municipality of Jernaya was established on December 27, 1963. Following the 2016 municipal elections, its members are: Joe Antoun (president), Jean Abboud, Johnny Khoury, Joseph Azar, Elias Abi-Najem, Jean Semaan, Charbel Hayek, Jean Sawaya, Nemr Hayek, Claude Hayek, George Jabbour, and Marie Najem.

Following a petition by the citizens of Jernaya, the Ministry of Agriculture published a decree stating that goats and livestock from neighboring villages are forbidden from entering the territory of the municipality (decree No. 11 on 14 March 1996).

There are two voter circumscriptions in Jernaya: Public School Room No. 1 and Public School Room No. 2. They have 640 and 618 members on their electoral rolls, respectively.

=== 2016 municipal election ===
Two competing lists, each made up of 12 candidates, ran for the 12 seats of the municipal council. All members of List 1 were elected.

- List 1's leader: Jean Abboud (475 votes)
- List 2's leader: Fady Hayek (231 votes)

== Attractions ==
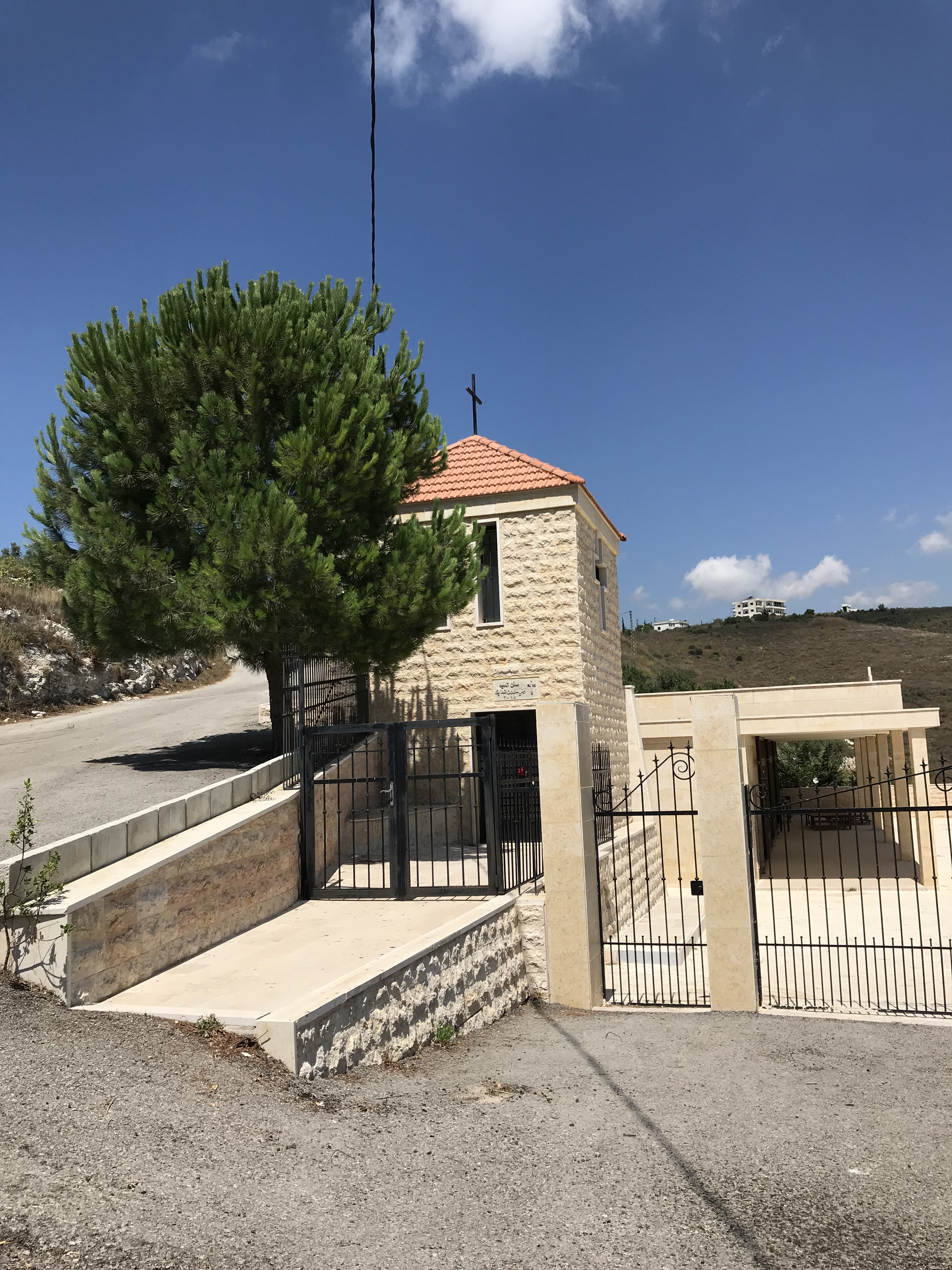
Municipal cemetery

Jernaya has a full-size basketball court on the Southeastern side (directly below the cemetery), and a community recreation center located on the ground floor of the municipality located downtown. There are two churches: Notre-Dame-de-Sainte-Marie (Our Lady of Saint Mary) and St. Elie chapel. The cathedral Notre-Dame-de-Jernaya (Our Lady of Jernaya) is currently under construction on the Eastern side of the village.

The hotel Erzel-Jernaya (Arabic: عرزال جرنايا) is located in the lush valley on the southern border of the village. The valley, which separates the Nabatiye and South-Lebanon governorates with a river running through its trough, is completely vegetated as construction is forbidden to preserve its character. It is an ideal spot for hunting, hiking, and camping.

The municipal cemetery (of Maronite confession) is located on the Eastern side of Jernaya. It contains a crypt for the deceased, numerous tomb vaults, and the mausoleum of General Elie Hayek. Saint-Elie chapel is located directly at the entrance of the cemetery.

A swimming pool and tennis court complex is currently being built at the municipality's eastern border.

Our lady of Jernaya, an old stone church built in 1847, located near the town square.

Jernaya annually celebrates the feast of its patron saint, "Our Lady of Jernaya," on August 15th, featuring a mass accompanied by artistic and cultural festivals that gather locals, residents, and expatriates at the village square.
