= Saksakiyeh =

Saksakiyeh السكسكية As-Saksakiyah
- Municipality
- Map of Saksakieh within Sidon District

- Location in Lebanon
- Coordinates: 33°26′13″N 35°17′05″E
- Country: Lebanon
- Governorate: South Governorate
- District: Sidon District

Area
  - Land: 1.08 sq mi (2.81 km^{2})
- Elevation: 330 ft (100 m)
- Time zone: UTC+2 (EET)
  - Summer (DST): UTC+3 (EEST)

Saksakiyeh^{n} (Arabic: السكسكية, romanized: as-Saksakiyah) is a municipality in the Sidon District of the South Governorate in Lebanon. It is located 61 kilometres (38 mi) from Beirut and 15 kilometres (9.3 mi) south of Sidon, and covers an area of 2,44 km². It has an elevation of 100m.

Various discoveries were made in the town that point towards it being an ancient town. The town has multiple archaeological features that can be inferred through the presence of a large number of ancient caves, in addition to an old water-powered mill that dates back to the 1800s.

== Name ==
The name "Saksakiyeh" is said to have originated from the Yemeni tribe of al-Sakāsik (السكاسك), who settled in Beit Lahia in southeastern Lebanon in 64 AH (683 CE). Al-Sakasik later moved to the fortified town of Sarafand, which was part of the coastal Thughur, and finally relocated to Saksakiyeh in the 8th century.

Another theory is that the name originates from the word سكّ which in Aramaic and Hebrew has two meanings, either quarrel and dispute, or agate and siege. Thus, the meaning of the name would be “the walled” or “the fortified”. The name could also originate from ܙܓܘܽܓܝܺܬܴܐ (zḡūḡīṯā): meaning glass or small bell in Aramaic, thus the town name would mean "the place where glass is made".

Other theories is that the name originates from:

- al-Sīsāʾiyya (السيسائيّة): from al-Sīsāʾ (السيساء), see Sīsūq (سيسوق). This is considered the most likely original form.
- al-Suqsuqiyya (السقسقية): from suqsuqa (سقسقة), meaning “chirping” or “a great number of birds.”
- al-Zaqzaqiyya (الزقزقيّة): from zaqzaqa (زقزقة), also meaning “birdsong” or “abundance of birds.”
- al-Saksakiyya (السكسكيّة): from saksaka (سكسكة), referring to “weakness” or the stealthy gait of a hunter moving lightly and bent over in order to deceive and catch birds (colloquial usage).
- al-Sāsāʾiyya (السأسأيّة): from sāsāsa (سأسأسة), meaning “the village of shepherds.”

In an older reference, the town is referred to as Al-Thakthakiye (الثكثكية).

Ludwig Noack (de) in his 1868 book, proposed that the modern town of Saksakiyeh in southern Lebanon is the ancient biblical town of Zanoah. Noack traced the name’s evolution through historical forms, suggesting a progression from Zanoah → Zakanaim → Zekhzekhieh.

== History ==
In his 1860s visit, Liévin de Hamme describes (Zakhzekiyeh) as a beautiful village located on a mountain.

In 1875, in the late Ottoman era, Victor Guérin traveled in the region, and noted about the village (which he called Zekzekieh): "This village, sitting on a height, is divided into two districts, one eastern, the other western. To the west of the latter, I am shown the location of an ancient fortress, now toppled from top to bottom, and from where the inhabitants extracted beautiful ashlars."

=== World War I ===
During WWI, the Ottomans set up a gallows in the city center to execute deserters who were forcefully enrolled into the Ottoman army. One of these deserters was Houssein Mohammed Kahloun who had fled 13 times before he was caught after his sister who was threatened by death exposed his location. He was taken to the gallows and hanged. The town's Mukhtar at the time Haidar Mohammad Haidar was taken by Ottoman soldiers and forced to witness the hanging.

=== World War II ===
In the summer of 1942 during WWII, a group of French soldier were wandering the street of Saksakiyeh when they were asked about their reason for being there, in which one of the soldiers is said to have replying disrespectfully.

Poet Mohamad Ali Wehbe then attacked the soldiers with a stick he was carrying, his friends (Abd al Azim Helmi, Mohamad Dieb Amer, Hassan Asaad Wehbe, Mohamad Chibli Baghdadi Mroueh, and Ali Hassan Dahi) then joined in the attack, forcing the soldiers to flee.

The soldiers reported the incident to Sergent Dawoud, who later visited the town and threaten the town's leading figures (Mohamad Haj Haidar Haidar, Houssien Al Haj Ali Abass, Chibli Baghdadi Mroue, Mohamad Baker Al Ibrahim). The town's leading figures refused to expose the location of the attackers who had to spend about a year hiding in caves until Lebanon got its independence on 22 November 1943.

=== Lebanese civil war ===
A list of Saksakieh Martyrs:

#	Name	Date of birth	Died	Location/Cause of death
1	Mustapha Mahmoud Dahi (Abo Adnan)	20-Apr-47	04-Nov-75	Saksakieh, shot by Houssien Ossaily by a submachine gun
2	Youssef Fadel Siblini	1958	06-Sep-80	Saida, ambushed and shot while on his way as an Amal representative for the Joint Coordination Committee of Saida
3	Commander Hassan Ali Siblini	1965	19-Apr-81	Saida, during random strikes by Saad Haddad (Israel backed militia)
4	Mahmoud Hassan Badran (Abo Malek)	1948	28-Jan-82	Jisr Al Kasmiyye, killed by Palestinian Arab Front
5	Commander Abo Hassan Nehmeh Mroueh	1942	12-Apr-82	Daawdiyye, ambush after a security meeting in Zefta
6	Commander Mohammad Hassan Abdo	1960	12-Sep-82	Madina Riyadiya Beirut, got hit my Israeli tank missile during planting of anti missile trap near
7	Houssien Ahmad Dahi	1960	29-Mar-84	Saksakieh, Israeli ambush while loading weapons and ammunitions to his car
8	Hassan Mohamad Kawtharani	1965	16-Nov-84	Asaymiyye, during a direct fight with Israeli forces in Asaymiyye (Between Saksakieh and Sarafand), alongside Nabil Hijazi
9	Hassan Shaker Siblini (Abo Ali)	07-Mar-56	18-Apr-85	Near Central Military Club, Beirut. After two days of engagements in West Beirut
10	Helmi Abd Al-Azim Helmi	02-Nov-66	18-Apr-85	Near Central Military Club, Beirut. After two days of engagements in West Beirut
11	Hani Ali Fakih	1965	26-Oct-86	Tanbourit, during the War of Camps, by a missile that hit an SUV he was in
12	Adnan Hassan Kawtharani	1956	26-Oct-86	Tanbourit, during the War of Camps, by a missile that hit an SUV he was in
13	Abbas Mohammad Shaaban (Kamal)	10-Feb-67	18-Feb-87	Beirut
14	Asaad Mohammad Tanana	1970	11-Oct-87	
15	Mohammad Houssien Amer	1966	08-May-88	Beirut
16	Mahmoud Ahmad Adib Amer	1970	16-Jan-89	Jbaa, during engagements during the War of Brothers
17	Nabil Fouad Tanana	1974	23-Dec-89	
18	Abdallah Mohamad Haidar	1967	24-Dec-89	
19	Houssien Mahmoud Alloul	01-Jun-66	17-Apr-90	Barbora, Beirut
20	Hani Siblini			
21	Ali Amer			
22	Ali Amer			
23	Abbas Amer			
24	Mohammad Ali Amer			
25	Hassan Badran			

=== 2006 Lebanon War ===
On 15 July 2006, an Israeli plane destroyed three bridges, one in Sarafand, one in Saksakieh, and one in Loubiyeh. The Saksakieh bridge attack led to death of the civilian Mohammad Hassan Mustapha Haidar. It took multiple years for the Saksakieh Bridge to be rebuilt completely. The bridge had an estimate cost to repair of 690,000 dollars which was planned to be paid for by Iran.

On 5 August 2006, an Israeli warplane fired two missiles at a two-story residential building in Al-Ghassaniyeh, it led to the death of 7 civilians doing a visit from their town of Saksakieh.

== Geography and geology ==
Topographic elevation map of Saksakieh, showing contour lines that indicate changes in terrain height.

Al-Saksakiya is located at an elevation of around 150 meters above sea level. About 6% of its land lies on a low plain ranging from sea level to 5 meters. The largest portion, 42%, is situated between 5 and 50 meters in elevation. Land between 50 and 100 meters accounts for 11%, while 34% lies between 100 and 150 meters. The remaining 7% of the area is above 150 meters.

On the coast, exists a sub-marine spring with a semi-rounded shape, extruding 150 m feed by a eocene rock formation, from Nsarieh, 1-2 km away, due to karstic faults (conduits).

As for the geological formation around the area, a transition from recent coastal deposits to older sedimentary rocks can be seen. The shoreline is mainly covered by Quaternary marine and alluvial sediments. Moving slightly inland towards Dauodiyye, the formation is made up mainly of Eocene to Miocene nummulitic limestones. Early geological surveys from the 1926 and 1940s show some variation in the interpretation. However more recent mapping confirms this general stratigraphic sequence.

Soil map of Saksakieh showing major soil associations, slope classes, and areas of rocky or degraded soils

The soils in and around the town are classified as Inceptisols, mainly belonging to the Xerochrepts great group. They include Typic Xerochrepts, fine-textured Calcixerollic Xerochrepts, Vertic Xerochrepts, and Entic Chromoxererts, which occur on level to sloping terrain.

== Demographics ==
The population has grown significantly throughout this last century.

The estimate population was 595 in 1927, all being Shia Muslims. The population increased to reach 1,775 in 1965, to 2,840 in 1981, 5,223 in 1997, and to 6,231 in 2002. Other estimate is 7,000 in 2002 with 3,200 eligible voters.

In 2014, Muslims made up 99.58% of registered voters in Saksakiyeh. 98.36% of the voters were Shiite Muslims.

== Education ==
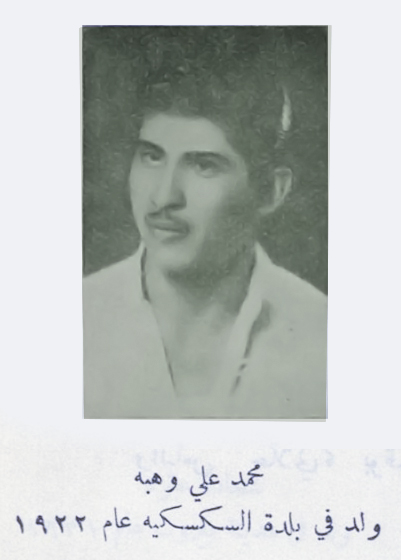
Portrait of Town's Poet Mohamad Ali Wehbe

Education in the town only properly started in around 1920, where Shiekh Khalil Helmi (Known as Al-Masri) educated children in one of the town's leading figure's house (Salim Mohammad Al-Arab). He had 45 students at the time including ones from neighboring towns. Education mostly consisted of learning the Quran and basic algebra. He was preceded by Shiekh Youssif Al-Masri who had about 40 students and educated at the same location until he later moved to Haje Chariefe Tawbi's house.

In 1930, Mohammad Baker Al-Ibrahim took over for about 20 years. He was followed by Sheikh Khalil Mahmoud Asaad Yehya.

Schools were constructed later. Currently the town has 3 schools with 1 of them being a private school and the other 2 being public schools.

=== Saksakieh Official School ===
Saksakieh Official School is an English-based school that opened in 1963.

School #: 1093							
	K.G	Grade 1–6	Grade 7–9	Total	Admins	Teachers	Ratio Students:Teachers
2001–2002	94	503	205	802	–	–	–
2002–2003	99	440	167	706	–	–	–
2012–2013	42	271	159	472	5	36	13.11
2013–2014	72	266	158	496	5	34	14.59
2015–2016	99	225	139	463	5	35	13.23
2017–2018	129	259	163	551	7	34	16.21
2020–2021	141	331	174	646	8	33	19.56

=== Takamol School ===
Takamol School opened in 1980 and is a private English-based school with classes from preschool to middle school.

School #: 5343–7868							
	K.G	Grade 1–6	Grade 7–9	Total	Admins	Teachers	Ratio students–teachers
2001–2002	94	228	93	415	–	–	–
2002–2003	116	250	68	434	–	–	–
2012–2013	140	362	79	581	5	30	19.37
2013–2014	183	379	91	653	4	34	19.21
2015–2016	192	334	109	635	3	29	21.90
2020–2021	66	183	58	307	5	17	18.06

=== Martyr Nehme Mroueh Official High School ===
Originally named Saksakieh Official High School, the school changed its name to Martyr Nehme Mroueh Official High School by a municipal decision in decree 763/16 issued on 18 October 2016.

School #: 1539				
	Students	Admins	Teachers	Ratio students–teachers
2012–2013	144	5	23	6.26
2013–2014	157	4	27	5.81
2015–2016	204	2	34	6.00
2017–2018	215	4	40	5.38
2020–2021	224	4	36	6.22

== Agriculture ==
Land cover map of Saksakieh, southern Lebanon, created from Sentinel-2 satellite imagery (2025).

14.78% of the town's population work in agriculture.

== The administrative and services aspect ==
The official latin town name is "Saksakiyeh". It is identified by the geographic code 61461. Within its cadastral area, it holds the serial number 1 and belongs to property zone number 20. The town spans an area of 288 hectares.

The town has a police station, two mosques, a Hussainiya for men and another for women, a dispensary, a governmental hospital and private hospital, a sports club, multiple charitable foundations, the Imam al-Mahdi Scouts, the Islamic Risala Scouts.

=== Saksakieh Governmental Hospital ===
The governmental hospital was built in the 1964 as a schistosomiasis center as part of the Litani River Project. However, it was used during the Lebanese Civil War as a military command center by some Lebanese parties and Palestinian organizations, it was then used a field hospital, and later as a police station by the town of Aadloun. It remained a police station for 7 years when it was later used as hospital under the name Musa Al Sadr Hospital, but that only lasted two-year, as in August 1992 it was handed over to the Ministry of Public Health.

In 1988, legal decree 5215/88 issued on 16 September 1988 stated that the schistosomiasis center of Property 496 would become a health center in addition to doing schistosomiasis research.

In 1993, legal decree 3379/93 issued on 7 April 1993 stated that the health center on Property 496 would become the Saksakieh Governmental Hospital (described as a middle sized hospital), this is due to the fact that based on 159/83 issued on 16 September 1983 a middle sized hospital with 70–100 beds at least is required for every 30,000 people.Algeria then provided fund to complete the hospital and purchase the required equipment. Dr Ali Jaber was put in charge.

In 1994, legal decree 5170/94 issued on 25 May 1994 would set hospital employees and staff as such:

Salary paid employees:
Position	#	Hours
Head of hospital	1	Full-time
Full-time medical foctor	4	Full-time
Full-time obstetrician durgeon	2	18
Gynecologist, snesthesiology, and reanimation doctor	1	1
General surgery doctor	2	18
Pediatrician	2	18
Ophthalmologist	1	18
Otolaryngologist (ear, nose, and throat)	1	18
Dermatologist	1	18
Gastroenterologist	1	18
Cardiologist	1	18
Radiologist	1	18
Hematologist	1	18
Dentist	1	18
Pharmacist	1	36
Registered nurse (head nurse)	1	48
Registered nurse (branch nurse)	4	48
Registered nurse	5	48
Anesthesia and resuscitation nurse	2	36
Midwife	2	48
X-ray technician	1	36
Chef	1	36

Hourly paid employees
Position	#
Assistant nurse	20
Pharmacist	1
Chef assistant	1
Maintenance worker	1
Seamstress	1
Clerk	1
Climacteric	2
Gatekeeper	1
Guard	4
Call	3
Receptionist	10
Car driver	3
Driver assistant	3

Dr. Hani Shgari was put in charge, and the hospital began to receive patients and provide health services. After less than a year, the hospital closed due to the lack of funding from the Ministry of Public Health and the lack of staff.

In 2005, legal decree 14159/05 issued on 8 February 2005 stated that a general organization is to be established to run the hospital. In article 2, it is stated that a 3-year board of directors of the organization would be headed by Eng. Ali Haidar Khalifeh with both Dr Faisal Mohammad Baghdadi Mroue and Dr Ibrahim Houssien Matar as board members.

The hospital was meant to operate as an independent entity able to fund itself; however that didn't work as it wasn't able to open, even after being given a sum of 2 million dollar by the Kuwait Fund for Arab Economic Development.

In 2007, legal decree 3/07 issued on 20 September 2007 stated that a new government hospital would be established in the neighboring town of Sarafand and would be approved as the Al-Zahrani district's government hospital, the decree also asks the Lebanese Council for Development and Reconstruction (CDR) to take the necessary steps to implement, construct, and prepare the hospital, the CDR was also given a loan of 10 million dollars to construct the new hospital. In addition, the Saksakieh Governmental Hospital on Property 496 returned to being a health center, as according to the decree the Saksakieh hospital has limited space and beds and can't be considered the district's hospital and the new Sarafand hospital was enough to meet the needs of the citizens in the district.

In 2009, legal decree 1564/09 issued on 26 March 2009 stated that Enayah Ghosn, the head of the Secretariat department at the Ministry of Public Health, would be appointed as a government commissioner at the General Organization for the Management of the Saksakieh Governmental Hospital for a period of one year.

The hospital remained closed until 8 February 2008 when a law degree to transfer it to a public organization by a request from the then minister of public health Jawad Khalifeh.

== Politics ==
The town has 15 municipal councils seats and 4 mukhtar seats. The town had a presence in the 2018 Lebanese general elections with 5,256 voters (5,250 Shia & 6 Sunni).

=== 1963 municipal elections ===
The first municipal election took place in 1963 after the Municipals Law of Lebanon 29/63 was issued on 29 May 1963, requesting all town have their own municipality, thus legal decree 1217/63 was issued on 27 December 1963 titled "Establishing a municipality in the village of Saksakieh- Sidon District", and stated that Saksakieh would have 8 municipal members. As such these 8 municipal members were elected:

- Khalil Mohamad Haidar (elected mayor)
- Hossien Yousif Younes
- Mohamad Hassan Abbass
- Hossien Abdo Aliahmad
- Mohamad Ahmed Nasrallah
- Hossien Ahmad Fakih
- Fadel Yousif Siblini
- Mohamad Chibli Baghdadi Mroue

Little to no record is present of the work done by this municipality.

=== 1998 municipal elections ===
The second election took place on 7 June 1998 after revision law 665/97 issued on 30 December 1997 (Revising Municipal Act Decree 118 issued on 30 June 1977). 15 Members were elected out of the 34 candidates. 2,383 voted out of the 3,112 eligible voters (76.57% turnout). The members met on 29 June 1998 and elect Mahmoud Ahmed Dahi as town mayor with Mahmoud Ahmad Moussa as deputy mayor.

Rank	Name	Votes	Percentage
1	Hossien Kassem Alloul	1,350	56.65
2	Mahmoud Ali Amer	1,346	56.48
3	Ahmed Abbass Abass	1,328	55.73
4	Mohamed Mahmoud Mashlab	1,321	55.43
5	Ali Youssif Younnes	1,300	54.55
6	Hassan Radwan Nasrallah	1,292	54.22
7	Mahmoud Hossien Badran	1,231	51.66
8	Khalil Mohamad Haidar	1,225	51.41
9	Adnan Mohamad Siblini	1,225	51.41
10	Adnan Nehme Obeid	1,202	50.44
11	Mohamed Ahmed Haidar	1,191	49.98
12	Mahmoud Ahmed Moussa (Deputy Mayor)	1,190	49.94
13	Mahmoud Ahmed Dahi (Elected Mayor)	1,170	49.10
14	Ahmed Houssien Hawili	1,106	46.41
15	Asaad Abed Al Kassem Fakih	990	41.54

=== 2010 municipal elections ===
The fourth municipal elections were done on 9 June 2010, there were only 15 candidates and thus they won by default, with Ali Salman Haidar as town mayor.

#	
1	Ali Hassan Berjawi
2	Mohammad Najib Fakih
3	Mahmoud Ahmad Ossaily
4	Ali Salman Haidar (elected mayor)
5	Wassim Mustapha Kawtharani
6	Adnan Mustapha Dahi
7	Ali Abd Al Razzak Mashlab
8	Hassan Mohammad Yehia
9	Mohammad Asaad Kahloun
10	Youssef Houssien Younis
11	Hassan Ali Sohiel
12	Youssef Ali Amer (deputy mayor)
13	Houssien Sami Obied
14	Mahmoud Jamil Al Haj
15	Mohammad Ali Bandar

=== 2016 municipal elections ===
The fifth municipal elections that were done on 6 June 2016 had 25 candidates, 15 of which were elected.

Rank	Name	Votes
1	Mahmoud Ahmad Ossaily	2,028
2	Kassem Ahmed Badran	1,954
3	Adnan Ali Younis	1,910
4	Ali Ahmad Abass	1,862
5	Houssien Kassem Alloul	1,816
6	Ali Mahmoud Darwich	1,783
7	Bilal Ghazi Al Arab	1,775
8	Mohamad Kassem Amer	1,734
9	Houssien Wehbe Alloul	1,519
10	Fatima Nehme Baghdadi Mroue	1,494
11	Mohamed Ali Wehbe	1,483
12	Adnan Mustapha Dahi	1,457
13	Jihad Houssien Siblini	1,430
14	Mahmoud Ahmad Dahi	1,411
15	Ali Hassan Berjawi	1,367

=== Town mukhtars ===
The first mukhtar of the town was Mohamed Hossein Amer who was a mukhtar during the Ottoman Rule. Followed by Haidar Mohamed Haidar who was mukhtar during the end of the Ottoman Rule. Followed by (in order):

- Abed Al Kassem Fakih
- Chibli Mohamad Baghdadi Mroue
- Mohamed Kassem Ahmad Fakih (Abo Hasib) (For a short period of time)
- Kassem Darwich Haidar (Who later resigned to pass it off to Chibli Mohamad Baghdadi Mroue)
- Mohamed Houssien Abbass (Abo Najib), along with Mohamed Ali Moussa Siblini, Ahmed Hassan Dahi, Mustafa Ahmed Obied, and Mohamad Amin Shoumar in 1963
- Mohamad Ali Sibini (Selected by the Mayor of South Lebanon) who later resigned
- Ahmad Hassan Dahi (Selected by the Mayor of South Lebanon)
- Najib Mohammad Abbass elected on 6 June 1998

==== Mukhtar elections 2010 ====
3 people were elected as the town's Mukhtars. Three candidates ran for the optional Mukhtar seats thus won by default.

#	Name	Position
1	Mohsen Mahmoud Siblini	Mukhtar
2	Amin Ali Shoumar	Mukhtar
3	Najib Mohammad Abbass	Mukhtar
–	Asaad Mohammad Wehbe	Optional Member
–	Hassan Ahmad Al Houssieni	Optional Member
–	Kassem Hassan Haidar	Optional Member

==== Mukhtar elections 2016 ====
4 out of the 10 candidates were elected as the town's Mukhtars. One candidate ran up for the optional Mukhtar seat and won by default.

Rank	Name	Votes	Position
1	Amin Ali Shoumar	1,923	Mukhtar
2	Hassan Ali Fakih	1,451	Mukhtar
3	Najib Mohamad Abbass	1,398	Mukhtar
4	Mohsen Mahmoud Siblini	1,245	Mukhtar
–	Ahmad Jamil Al Haj	0	Optional Member

== Notes ==
^n It's also transliterated Saksakieh, Saksakie, Saksakiye, Alsaksakieh, Alsaksakie, or Alsaksakiye.

== Bibliography ==
- Guérin, V. (1880). Description Géographique Historique et Archéologique de la Palestine (in French). Vol. 3: Galilee, pt. 2. Paris: L'Imprimerie Nationale.
