= Al-Salihiyya =

Al-Salihiyya or al-Salihiyah (and variations) may refer to:

- Al-Salihiyah, Damascus, a neighborhood in Damascus, Syria
- Al-Salihiyah, Hama, a village in Syria
- Al-Salihiyah, Deir ez-Zor Governorate, a village in Deir ez-Zor Governorate, Syria
- Al-Salihiyah, Rif Dimashq, a village in Rif Dimashq Governorate, Syria
- Al Salihiyah (Riyadh), a neighborhood in Riyadh, Saudi Arabia
- Al-Salihiyya, Palestine, a depopulated Palestinian village in the Hula valley
- El Salheya, a city in the Sharqia Governorate, Egypt
- Salihiyya, a Sufi order prominent in Somalia
- Salihiyya Madrasa, a medieval center of Islamic learning in Cairo, Egypt
- Salhiyeh (Saida), a village in the Sidon District, Lebanon
- Salehiyeh, a village in Razavi Khorasan Province, Iran
- Salehieh, a city in Tehran Province, Iran

== See also ==
- Salihids
