= Kfar Hatta =

Kfar Hatta كفرحتى Kfarhata/ Kfarhatta
- Municipality
- Location in Lebanon
- Coordinates: 33°30′9″N 35°27′8″E
- Country: Lebanon
- Governorate: South Governorate
- District: Sidon
- Elevation: 1,150 ft (350 m)
- Time zone: UTC+2 (EET)
  - Summer (DST): +3

Kfar Hatta (Arabic: كفرحتى, romanized: Kfar Ḥattā) is a municipality located in the Sidon District of the South Governorate in Lebanon. It is located 8 kilometres east of Sidon.

== History ==
Settlement here has ranged from as far back as the Romans, as seen by the once present Roman aqueducts (destroyed). There is also a small empty tomb cave to the east of the village cut out of the rock. The village also has the claimed tomb of a prophet, Nabi Nasser, however this is unknown if it is a prophets tomb at all. In the area around Nabi Nasser there used to be ruins of a city or town that could date to the 2nd century AD, with many clay pots, oil lamps, and Roman coinage found around it. In 1838, Eli Smith noted Kefr Hatta as a village by Jezzin, "East of et-Tuffa".

The main village was destroyed in an earthquake in 1956, so the villagers built south of the graveyard. There are three mosques in the village. The newest mosque was built in the 1960s, with two mosques to the north in the old area old the village, the newer of them dating before 1956 and still standing with some use, and the older being in ruins.

It is bordered from the south with a large valley which contains many caves and the river of Nahar Sainik, to the south east the village of Kfar Beit, further to the east is the village of Kfar Melki, to the north west is the village of Mjaydel, and by Hassaniyeh to the north.

The village also has an 'ain, Ain al Nabi (Spring of the Prophet, referring to the Nabi Nasser) to the south.

The village is split into three. To the west is 'Isoof (عسوف) the newer part of the village. Main Kfar Hatta is around the mosque, and Al-Krom (الكروم), to the east. Isoof was designed by the government after the earthquake.

== Etymology ==
The original name of the village used to be Kfar Hiti (Arabic: كفر حتِي) but slowly evolved into Kfar Hatta due to it being easier to say. While it is unknown what Kfar means, it is speculated that it may mean "land of", meaning that the name means "land of Hiti" which Hiti is a family name, as it still is. 'Isoof comes from the Arabic Qisoof (Arabic: قعسوف) meaning an exposed place to wind, or a place where the wind blows. Al-Krom means the trellis they used to grow grapes.

== Demographics ==
In 2014, Muslims made up 99.55% of registered voters in Kfar Hatta. 96.16% of the voters were Shiite Muslims.

== Bibliography ==
- Robinson, E.; Smith, E. (1841). Biblical Researches in Palestine, Mount Sinai and Arabia Petraea: A Journal of Travels in the year 1838. Vol. 3. Boston: Crocker & Brewster.
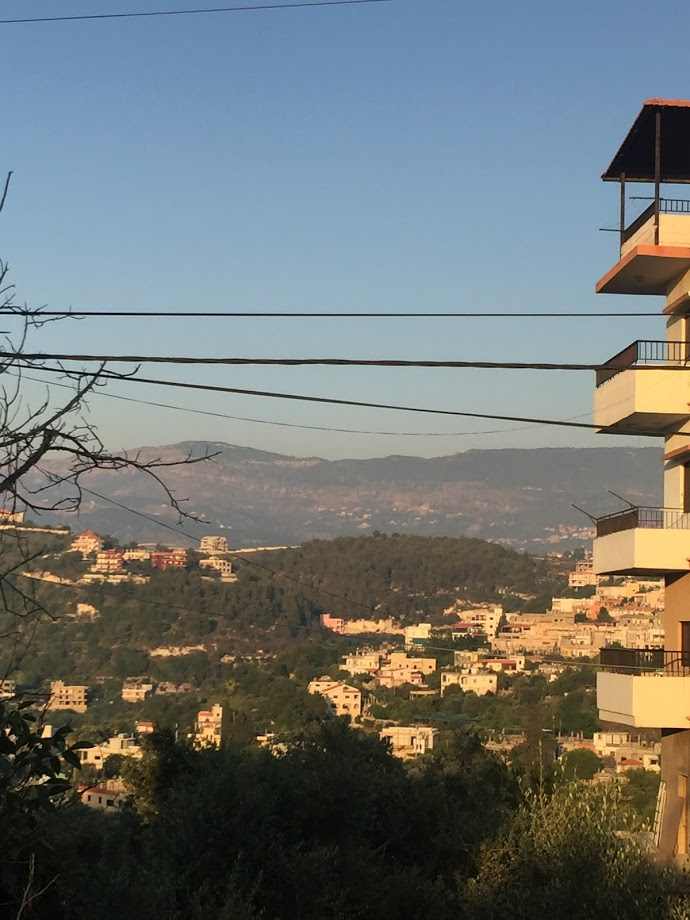
The village as seen from the merged village of Isoof in the northwest

The Mosque of Kfar Hatta

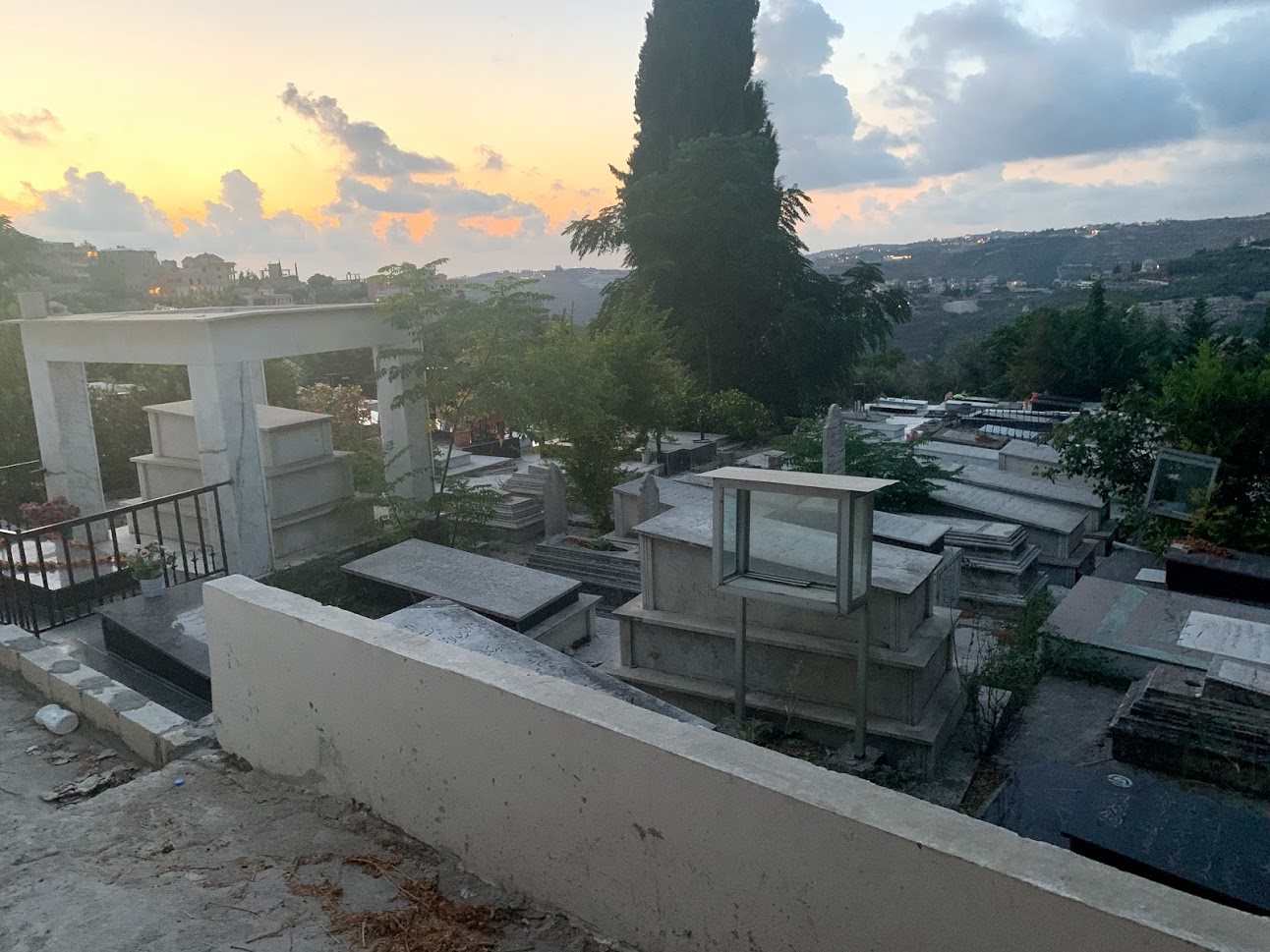
The Graveyard of Kfar Hatta, one of the oldest areas of the village

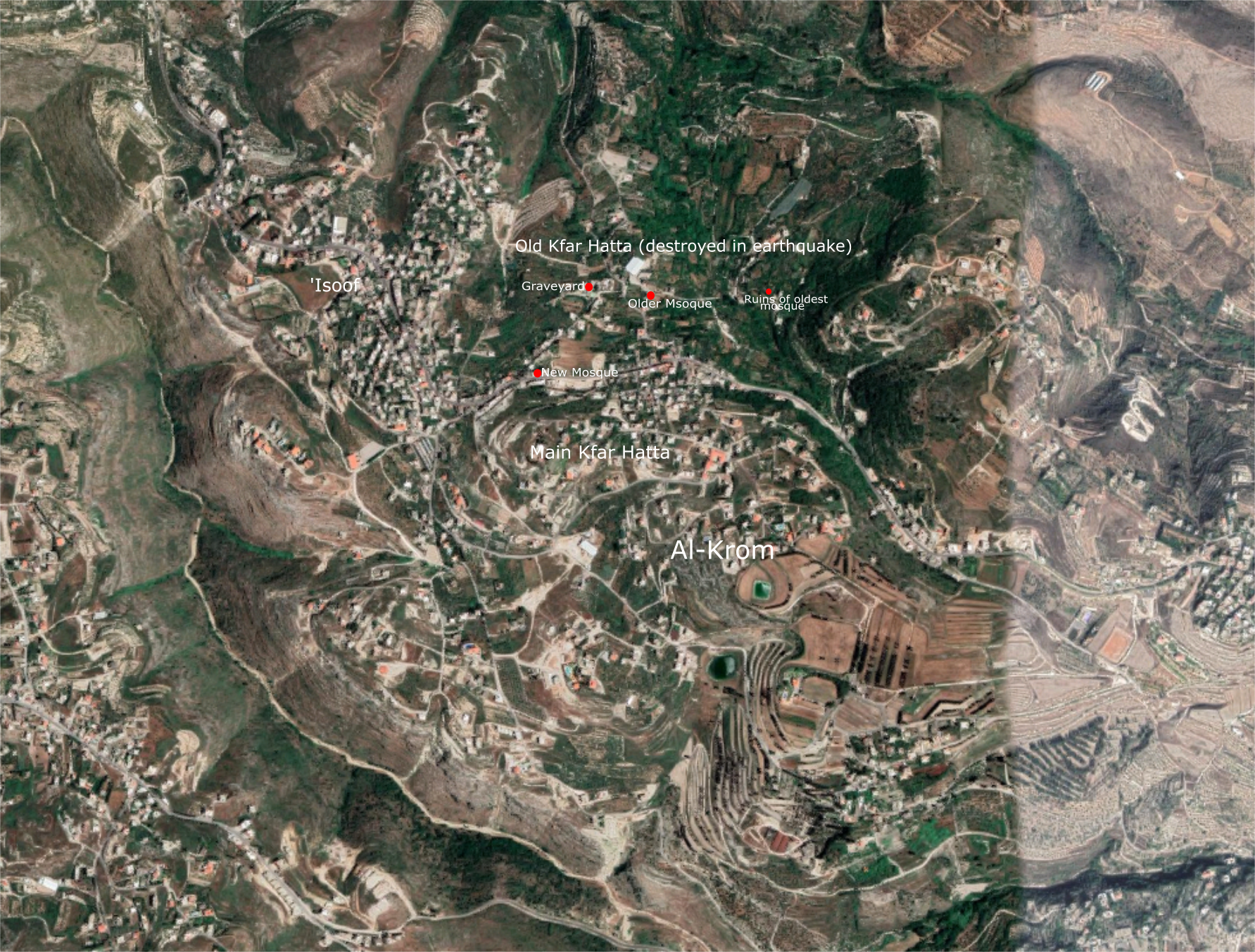
A labeled map of Kfar Hatta
