= Kfaraya =

Kfaraya كفريا Kafarya
- Municipality
- Location in Lebanon
- Coordinates: 33°33′33″N 35°26′07″E
- Country: Lebanon
- Governorate: South Governorate
- District: Sidon District
- Time zone: UTC+2 (EET)
  - Summer (DST): UTC+3 (EEST)

Kfaraya (Arabic: كفريا) is a municipality in the Sidon District of the South Governorate in Lebanon.

== History ==
In 1875, Victor Guérin travelled in the area, and noted: "About 1,800 metres north of Kefr Djerra rises, on a neighbouring hill, another village, also of little importance and inhabited by Maronites and by "united Greeks". It is called Kefr Aya. Between these two villages flows a spring which feeds them with water, and which is called A'in Kefr Aya, or A'in ei-Hajar, because it comes out of the bosom of the rocks.

== Demographics ==
In 2014, Christians made up 99.11% of registered voters in Kfaraya. 82.33% of the voters were Greek Catholics.

== Bibliography ==
- Guérin, V. (1880). Description Géographique Historique et Archéologique de la Palestine (in French). Vol. 3: Galilee, pt. 2. Paris: L'Imprimerie Nationale.
