= Majdelyoun =

Majdelyoun مجدليون Majdalyoun
- Municipality
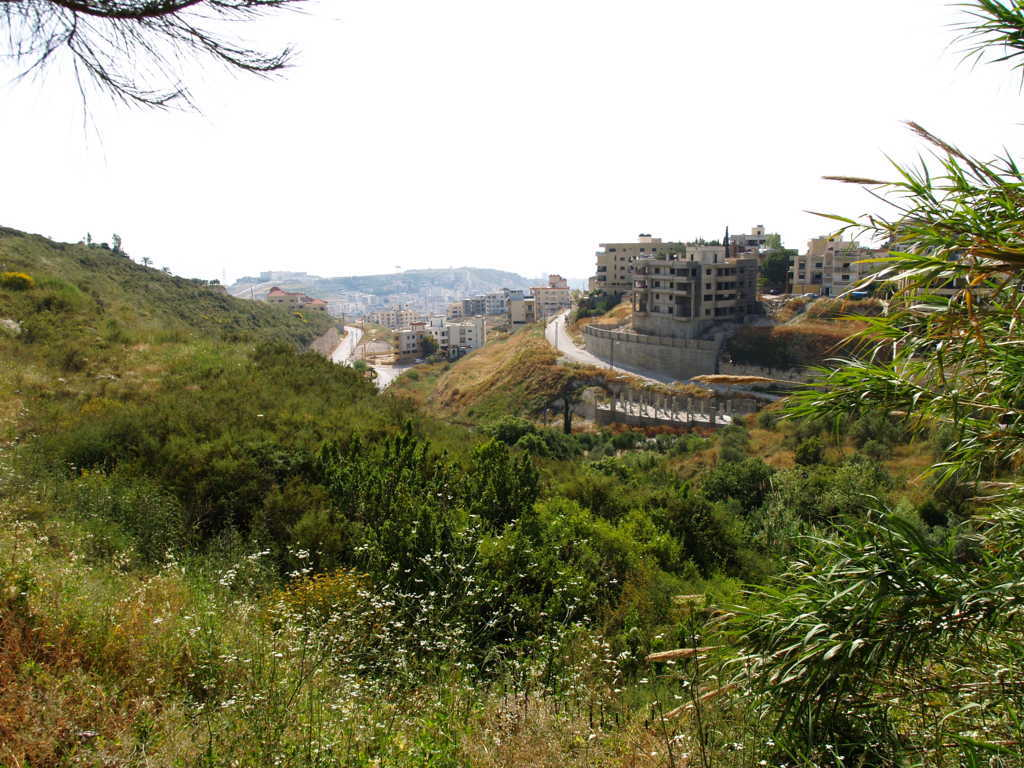

- Location in Lebanon
- Coordinates: 33°33′39″N 35°24′38″E
- Country: Lebanon
- Governorate: South Governorate
- District: Sidon District

Government
  - Type: Mayor–council
  - Body: Majdelyoun municipality

Area
  - Total: 1.5 km^{2} (0.58 sq mi)
- Highest elevation: 210 m (690 ft)
- Time zone: UTC+2 (EET)
  - Summer (DST): UTC+3 (EEST)
- Dialing code: 00961 (7) Landline

Majdelyoun (Arabic: مجدليون, romanized: Majdelyūn) is a municipality in Southern Lebanon located 45 km (28 mi) from Beirut and 5 km (3.1 mi) east of Sidon at an elevation of 210 m (690 ft) above sea level. Majdelyoun occupies 150 ha (1.5 km^{2}; 0.58 mi^{2}). The village is bordered to the east by Salhieh and Kfarjarra, to the west by Haret Saida, top the north by Salhieh and Abra, and to the south by Ayn Ed Delb and Krayye.

== Etymology ==
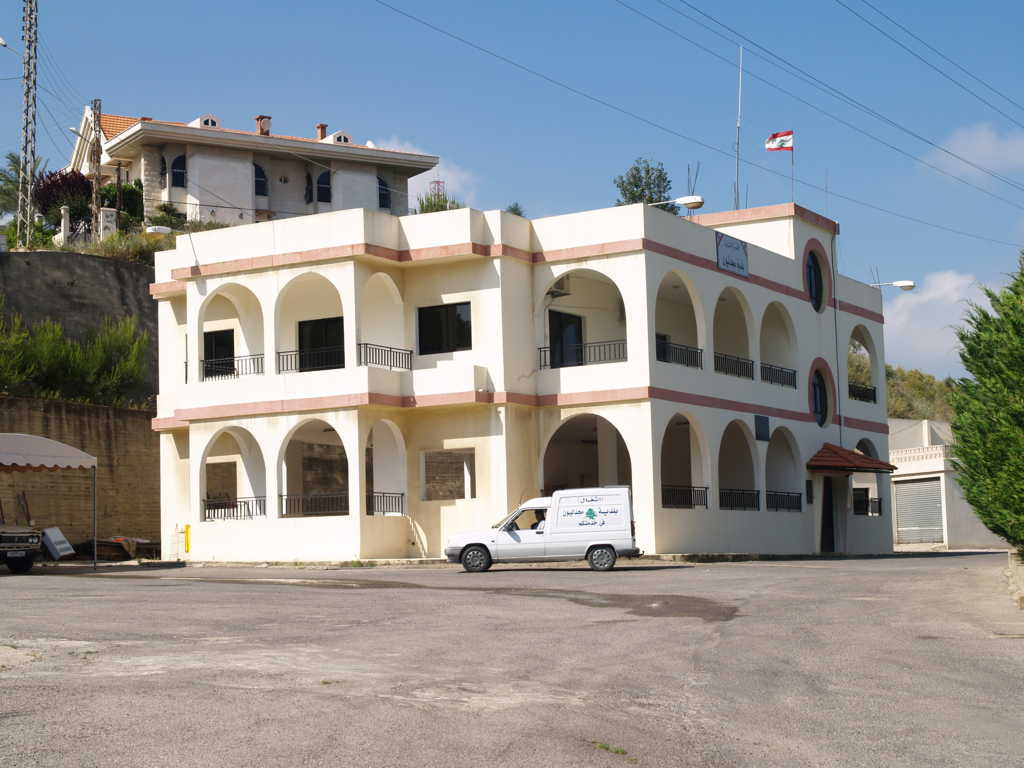
Majdelyoun's municipality

The origin of the name Majdelyoun may refer to a Syriac word meaning: "guard tower," "the castle," or "small tower." While the exact date of the town's founding is not known, it is believed to have been inhabited since ancient times. Alternatively, the name may originate in a tale told by an old man called Tanios Fakhoury. He said that the name of the town is related to a person named Leon, who had great glory (majd مجد in Arabic) days with the French and earlier, and most likely lived in the town that led to Majdelyoun’s name (Majd al-Krum and Lyon). It is also said that Maryum Majdelyoun was an important Christian woman who hailed from the same town. According to a local legend, she perfumed the hair of Jesus Christ before his supposed crucifixion.

== History ==
In 1838, Eli Smith noted Mejdeluneh, as a village located "North of et-Tuffah, next the coast".

In 1875, Victor Guérin travelled in the area, and noted "a mound, which is crowned by the small village of Medjdel Youn. It contains barely 120 inhabitants, Maronites or United Greeks."

== Organization ==
Majdelyoun is famous for its palaces—among them Rafik Hariri’s palace—and villas that are integrated with lush vegetation to make a distinctive town, half of which is green. It is divided by three parallel streets. The town has been divided into two regions: the lower region is for residential buildings and the higher region is for luxury villas.

== Demographics ==
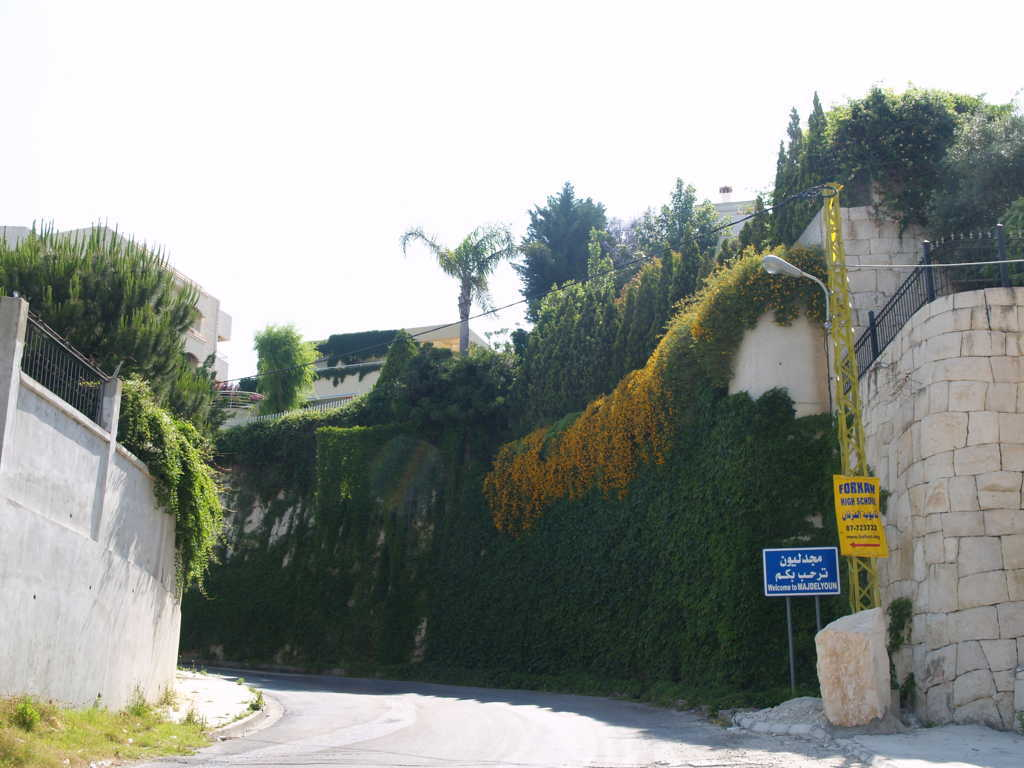
Southern entrance of Majdelyoun (From El Hara)

In 2014 Christians made up 97.63% of registered voters in Maghdouché. 67.54% of the voters were Greek Catholics and 23.13% were Maronite Catholics.

== Economy and education ==
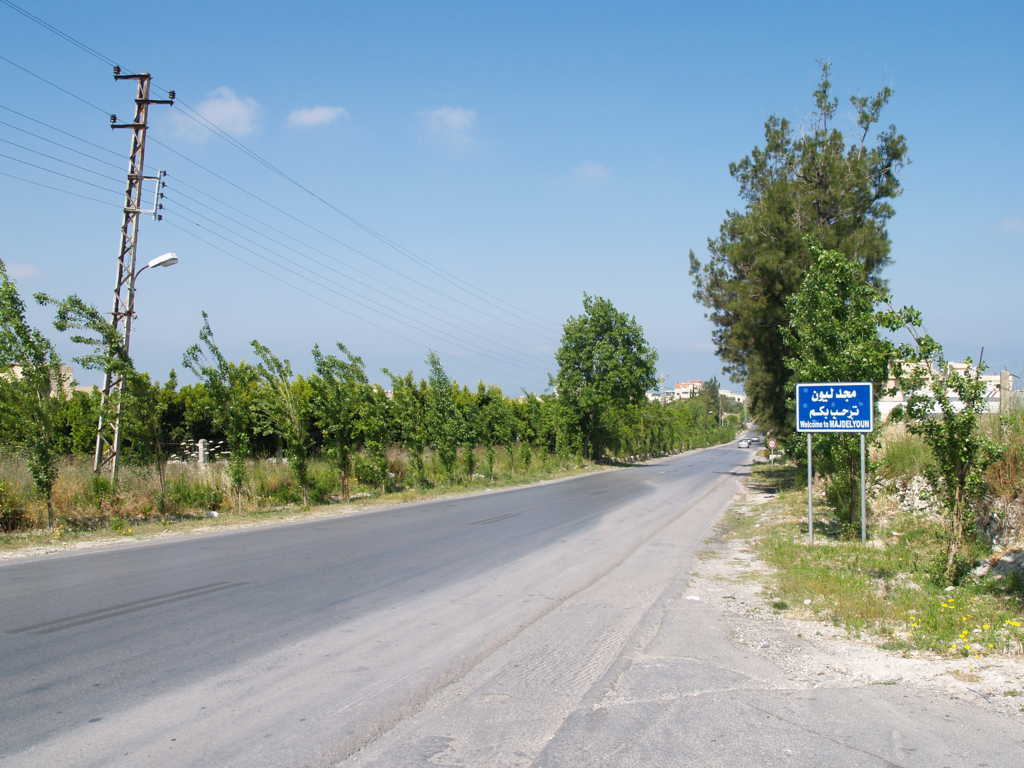
Eastern entrance of Majdelyoun (From Jezzine)

Majdelyoun was famous in ancient times for olive cultivation, but the circumstances have changed in the recent past. Today the town confines its business to some shops which began to grow steadily, especially on the highway, and contribute to the growth of the local economy. The town is lacking public and private establishments and has no schools or hospitals. It has one Catholic church and two mosques.

== Climate ==
August is the warmest month, with an average temperature of 31.1 °C (88.0 °F) at noon. January is coldest with an average temperature of 9.3 °C (48.7 °F) at night. Majdelyoun has marked temperate changes between winters and summers. The temperatures do not vary significantly between day and night. Frosts can occur in winter; January is commonly the coldest month of the year. September is on average the month with most sunshine. Rainfall and other precipitation peaks around December. June is normally the driest month.

Climate data for Majdelyoun, Lebanon
Month	Jan	Feb	Mar	Apr	May	Jun	Jul	Aug	Sep	Oct	Nov	Dec	Year
Mean daily maximum °C (°F)	17.0 (62.6)	18.0 (64.4)	20 (68)	23.0 (73.4)	26.0 (78.8)	28.0 (82.4)	30 (86)	31.0 (87.8)	30 (86)	28.0 (82.4)	23.0 (73.4)	19.0 (66.2)	24.4 (76.0)
Mean daily minimum °C (°F)	11.0 (51.8)	11.0 (51.8)	13.0 (55.4)	15 (59)	18.0 (64.4)	22.0 (71.6)	24.0 (75.2)	25 (77)	24.0 (75.2)	21.0 (69.8)	16.0 (60.8)	13.0 (55.4)	17.8 (63.9)
Average precipitation mm (inches)	133 (5.22)	110 (4.5)	61 (2.42)	25 (.98)	13 (.50)	1.0 (.04)	0 (0)	3.0 (.12)	5.1 (.2)	47 (1.85)	94 (3.71)	128 (5.04)	624 (24.58)
Average precipitation days (≥ 0.25 mm)	14	11	10	6	3	0	0	0	2	6	9	13	74
Source: World Weather Online,

== Gallery ==
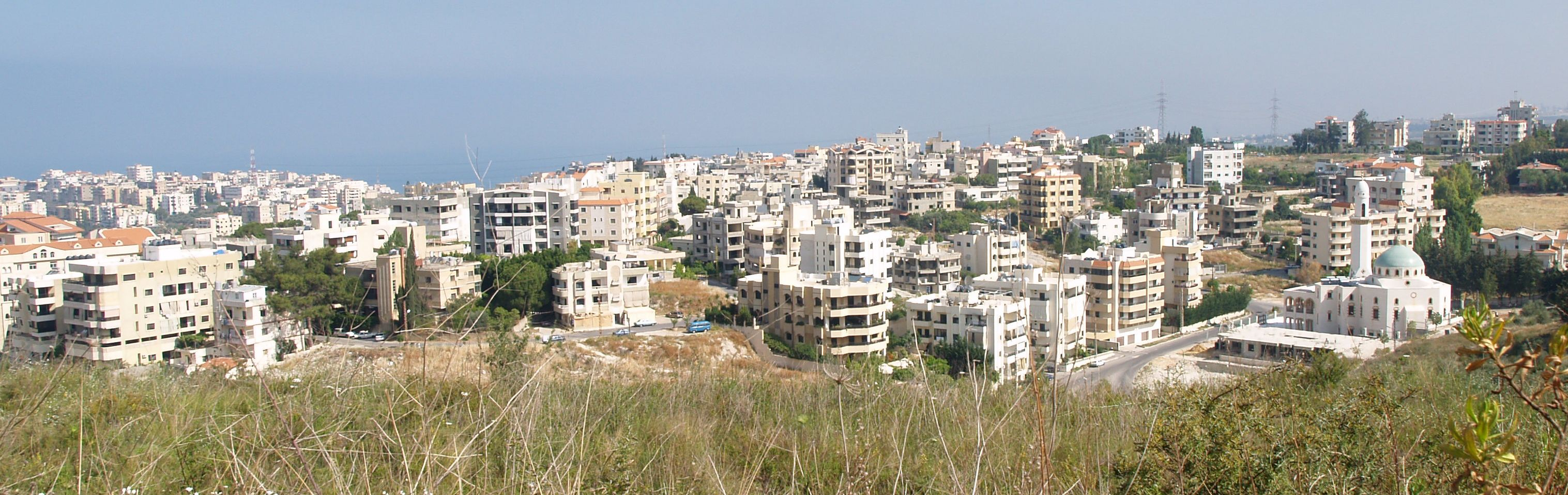
Panorama of Majdelyoun

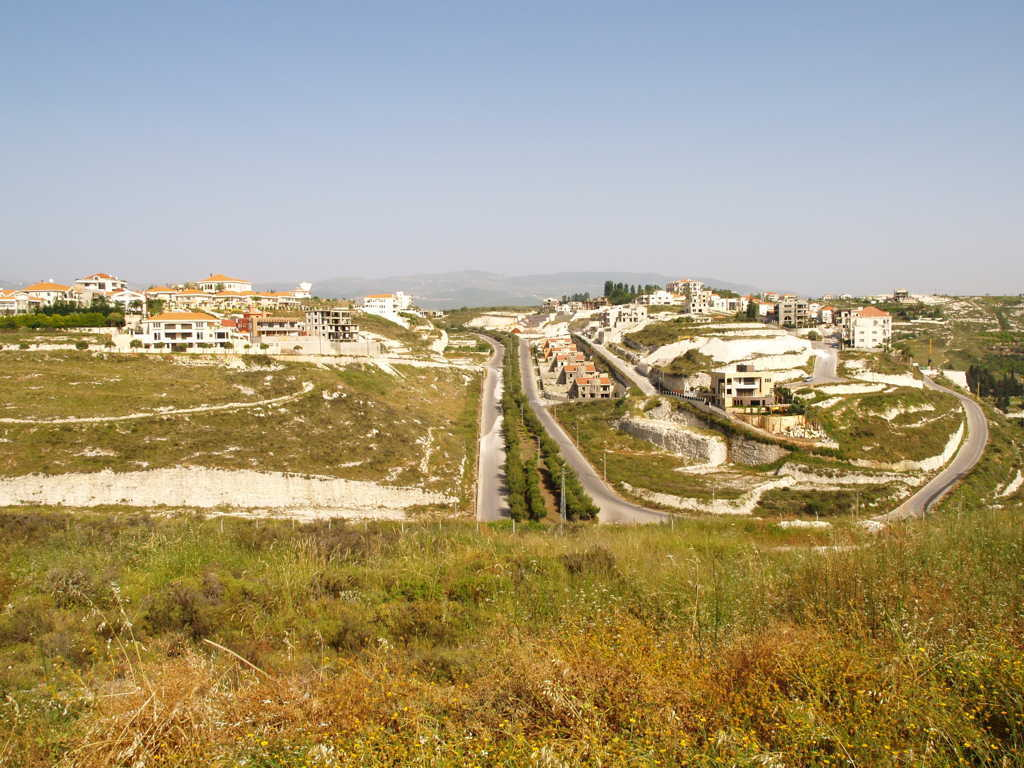
eastern part of Majdelyoun

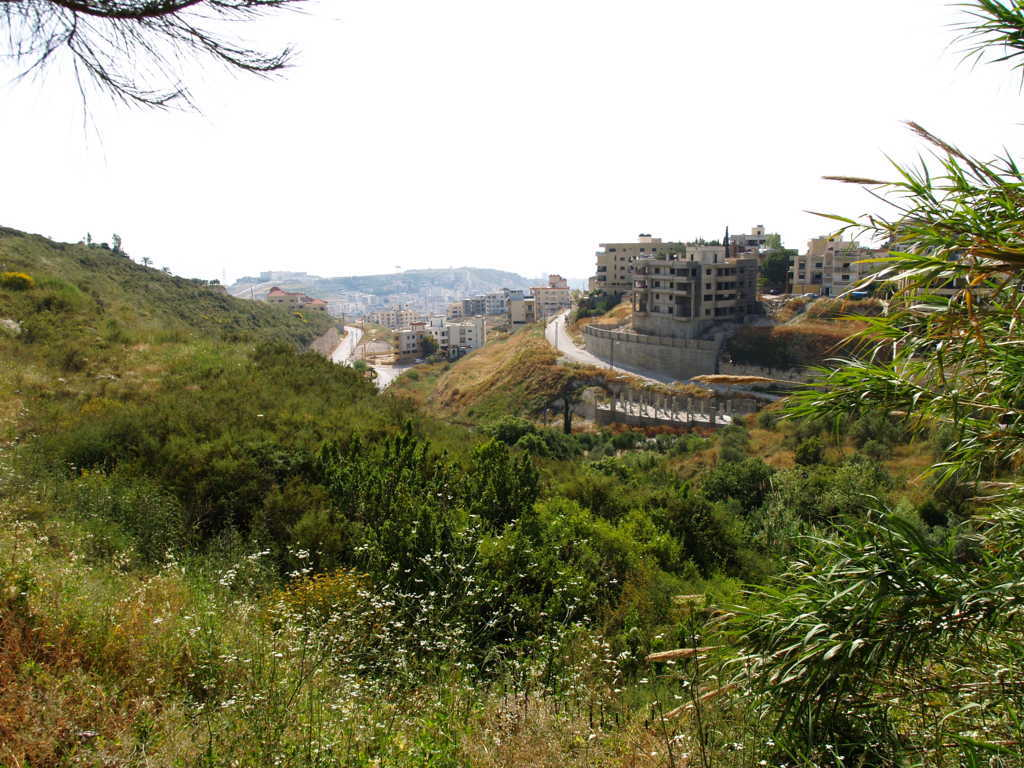
St Elias hill viewed from Majdelyoun

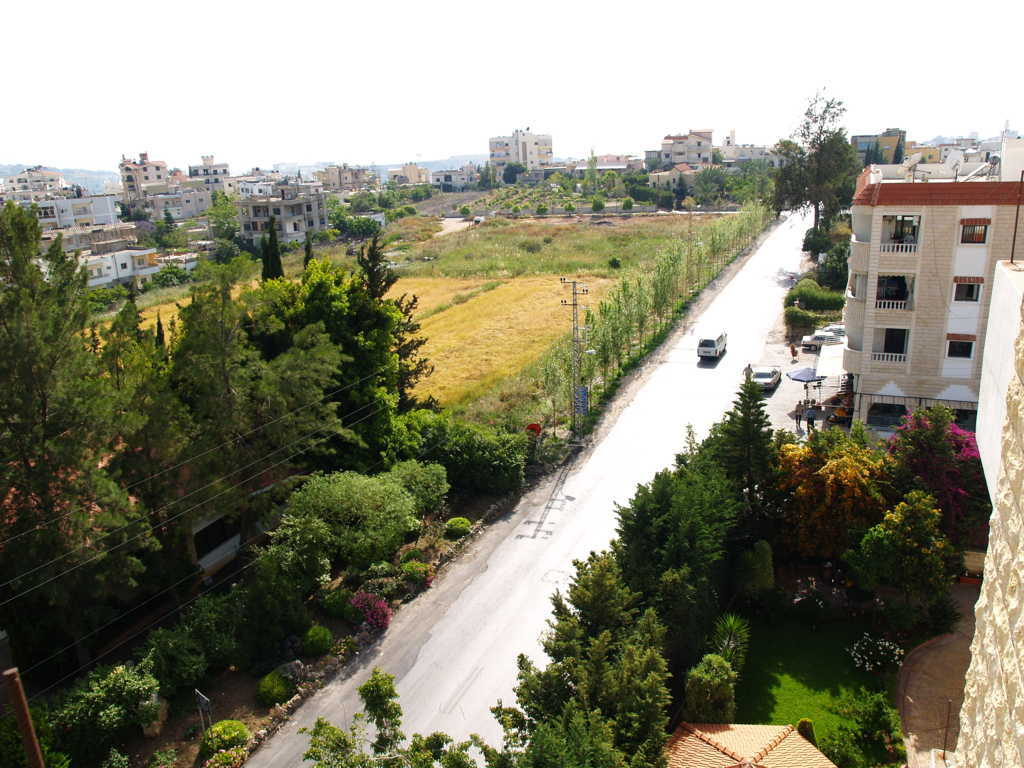
Main road

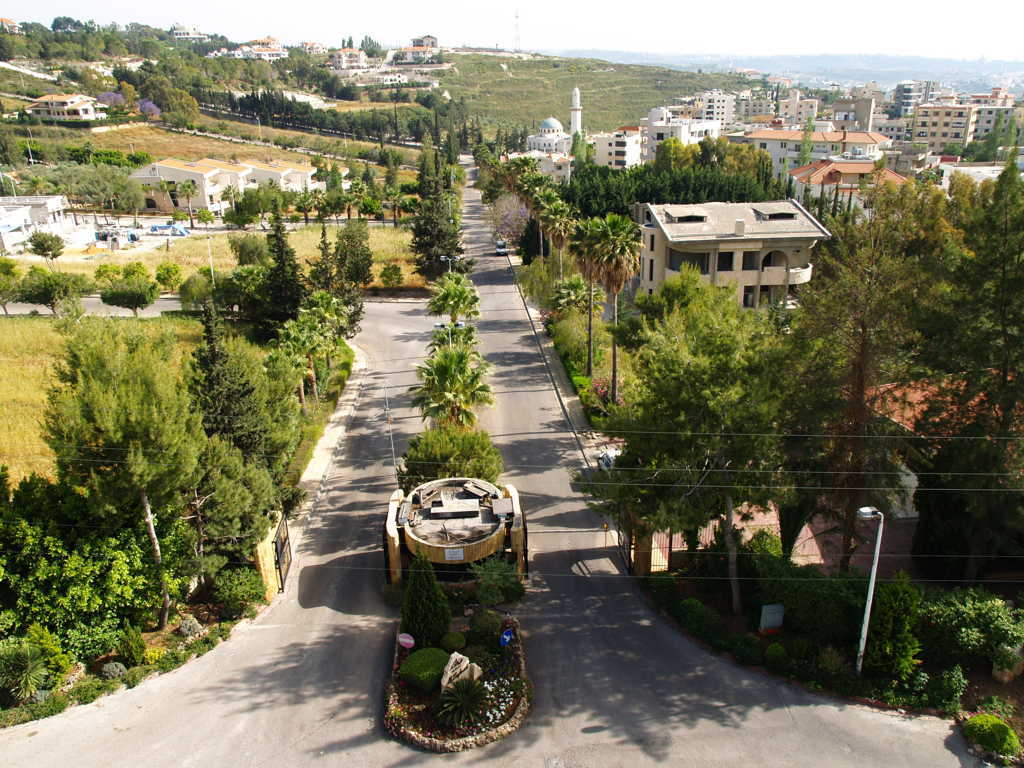
Majdelyoun's Zeydaniyat (private villas)

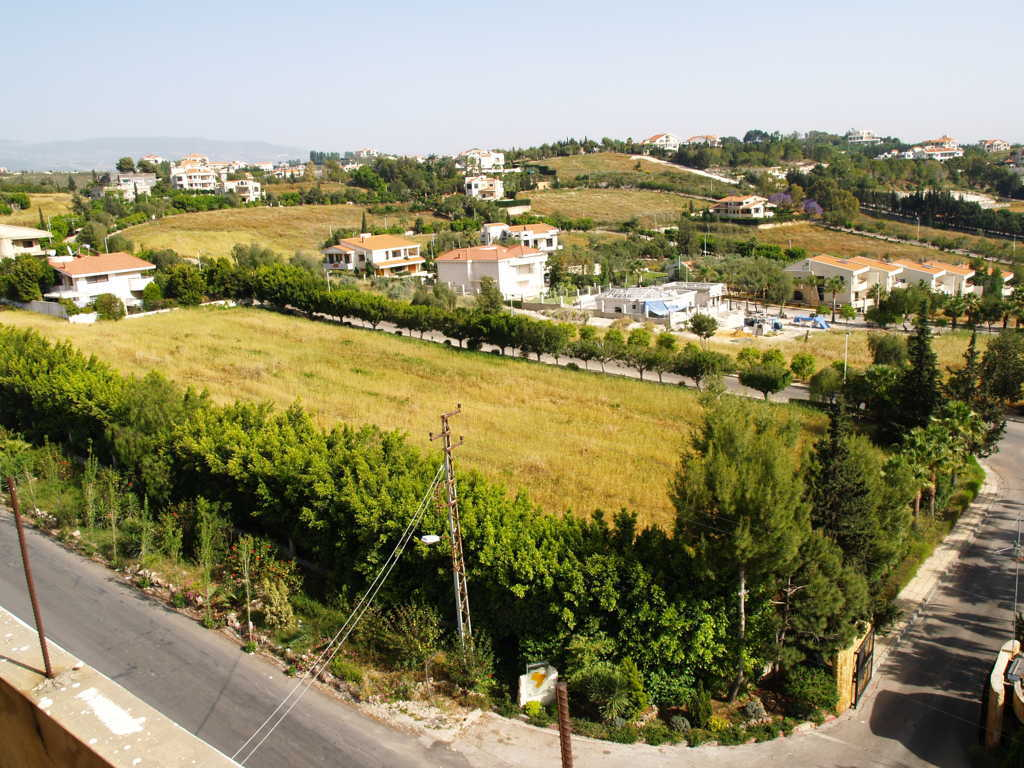
Majdelyoun's Zeydaniyat (private villas)

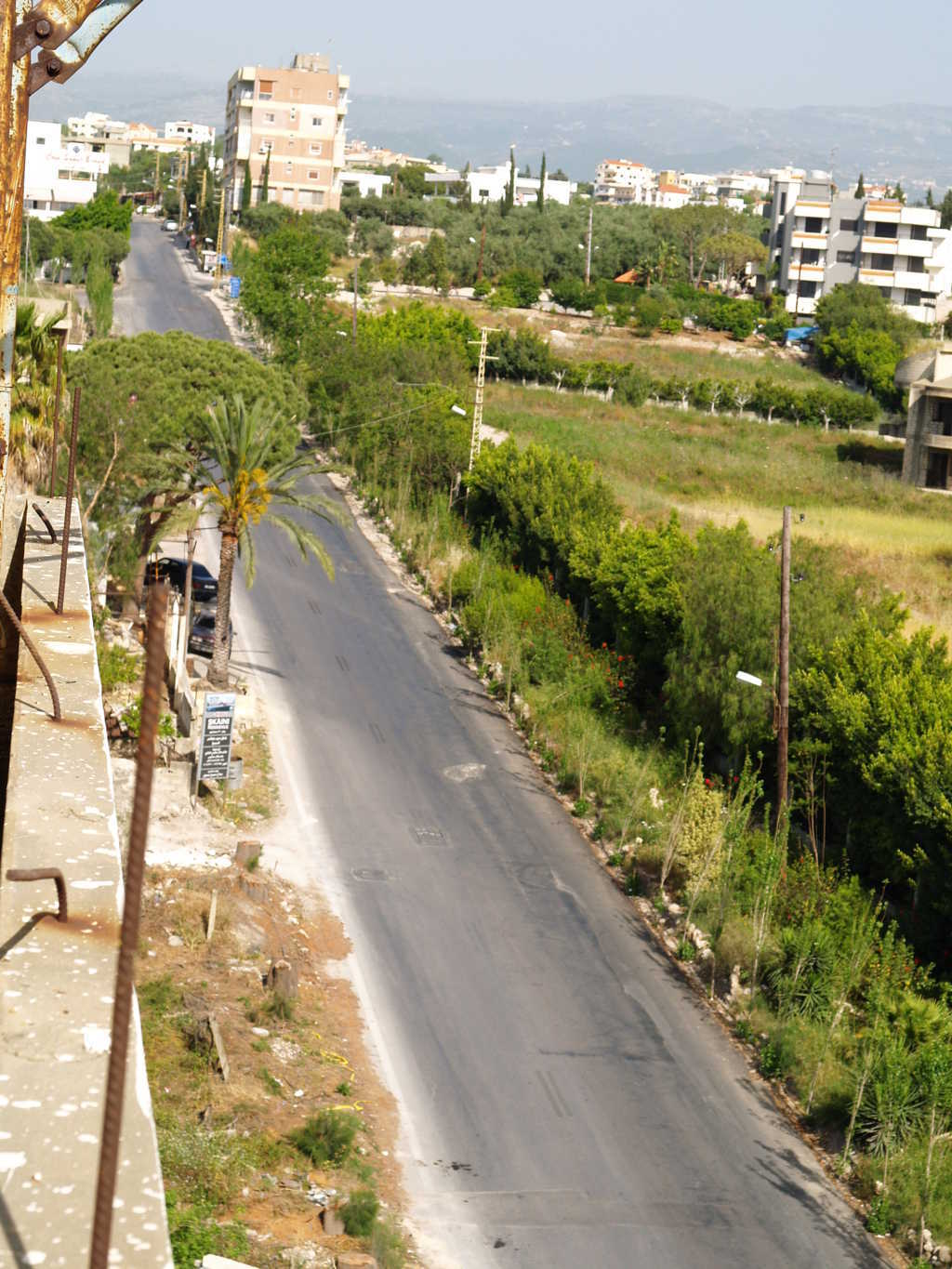
Main road towards Jezzine

== Bibliography ==
- Guérin, V. (1880). Description Géographique Historique et Archéologique de la Palestine (in French). Vol. 3: Galilee, pt. 2. Paris: L'Imprimerie Nationale.
- Robinson, E.; Smith, E. (1841). Biblical Researches in Palestine, Mount Sinai and Arabia Petraea: A Journal of Travels in the year 1838. Vol. 3. Boston: Crocker & Brewster.
