= Mazraat El Aousamiyyat =

Mazraat El Aousamiyyat مزرعة الاوساميات
- Village
- Grid position: 116/173 L
- Country: Lebanon
- Governorate: South Governorate
- District: Sidon District

Area
  - Total: 3.05 sq mi (7.9 km^{2})
- Elevation: 750 ft (230 m)
- Time zone: UTC+2 (EET)
  - Summer (DST): UTC+3 (EEST)

Mazraat El Aousamiyyat (Arabic: مزرعة الاوساميات) is a village in the Sidon District in Lebanon.
