= Ain Ed Delb =

Ain Ed Delb عين الدلب
- Municipality
- Location in Lebanon
- Coordinates: 33.541104°N 35.388272°E
- Country: Lebanon
- Governorate: South Governorate
- District: Sidon District
- Time zone: UTC+2 (EET)
  - Summer (DST): UTC+3 (EEST)

Ain Ed Delb (Arabic: عين الدلب, romanized: ʿAyn ad-Delb) is a municipality in the Sidon District of the South Governorate in Lebanon.

== History ==
In 1875 Victor Guérin found the village to be inhabited by Maronites.

On 29 September 2024, a series of Israeli missile strikes destroyed a six-storey building, killed 73 people, and injured at least 29 others, making it the single deadliest Israeli strike in its conflict in Lebanon. The IDF stated that the strike was on a "terrorist command centre" for Hezbollah, had killed a Hezbollah commander, and that "the overwhelming majority" of the dead were "confirmed to be terror operatives". A January 2025 report by the BBC was able to verify the identities of 68 of the dead, and found only six with Hezbollah links, none of whom were in senior positions. The remainder were civilians, including 23 children.

== Demographics ==
In 2014 Christians made up 98.49% of registered voters in Ain Ed Delb. 61.92% of the voters were Maronite Catholics and 32.66% were Greek Catholics.

== Bibliography ==
- Guérin, V. (1880). Description Géographique Historique et Archéologique de la Palestine (in French). Vol. 3: Galilee, pt. 2. Paris: L'Imprimerie Nationale.
