= Salhiyeh, Lebanon =

Village in South Governorate, Lebanon

Salhiyeh الصالحية As-Salhiyah
- Municipality
- Location in Lebanon
- Coordinates: 33°33′37″N 35°25′24″E
- Country: Lebanon
- Governorate: South Governorate
- District: Sidon District

Area
  - Land: 0.56 sq mi (1.45 km^{2})
- Elevation: 660 ft (200 m)
- Time zone: UTC+2 (EET)
  - Summer (DST): UTC+3 (EEST)

Salhiyeh (Arabic: الصالحية, romanized: aṣ-Ṣālḥiyah) is a municipality in the Sidon District of the South Governorate in Lebanon. It is located 45 kilometres (28 mi) from Beirut.

== History ==
In 1838, Eli Smith noted es-Salihiyeh, as a village located in "Aklim et-Tuffah, adjacent to Seida".

In 1875 Victor Guérin traveled in the region, and noted: "I go up to Salhaieh, through gardens planted with fig trees, olive trees and mulberry trees. It is located on a beautiful and high hill, 2 kilometers west-northwest of Kefr Djerra. Its population exceeds 400 inhabitants, Maronites or United Greeks. The church and a number of houses are newly built, with more or less regular stones that have been partly found on site. A spring collected under an ogival vault is next to several ancient tombs."

== Demographics ==
In 2014, Christians made up 98.17% of registered voters in Salhiyeh. 71.31% of the voters were Greek Catholics and 18.97% were Maronite Catholics.

== Bibliography ==
- Guérin, V. (1880). Description Géographique Historique et Archéologique de la Palestine (in French). Vol. 3: Galilee, pt. 2. Paris: L'Imprimerie Nationale.
- Robinson, E.; Smith, E. (1841). Biblical Researches in Palestine, Mount Sinai and Arabia Petraea: A Journal of Travels in the year 1838. Vol. 2. Boston: Crocker & Brewster.
