= Tanbourit =

Village in South Governorate, Lebanon

Tanbourit طنبوريت
- Municipality
- Location in Lebanon
- Coordinates: 33°30′57″N 35°24′54″E
- Country: Lebanon
- Governorate: South Governorate
- District: Sidon District

Area
  - Land: 1.11 sq mi (2.87 km^{2})
- Elevation: 980 ft (300 m)
- Time zone: UTC+2 (EET)
  - Summer (DST): UTC+3 (EEST)

Tanbourit (Arabic: طنبوريت, romanized: Ṭanbūrīt) is a municipality in the Sidon District of the South Governorate in Lebanon. It is located 53 kilometres (33 mi) from Beirut.

== History ==
In 1875 Victor Guérin traveled in the region, and noted the village Tanbourit "beyond a ravine". The inhabitants were Maronites.

== Demographics ==
In 2014, Christians made up 98.40% of registered voters in Tanbourit. 86.10% of the voters were Maronite Catholics.

== Bibliography ==
- Guérin, V. (1880). Description Géographique Historique et Archéologique de la Palestine (in French). Vol. 3: Galilee, pt. 2. Paris: L'Imprimerie Nationale.
