= Arab Tabbaya =

Human settlement in Lebanon

Arab Tabbaya عرب طبايا
- Municipality
- Location in Lebanon
- Country: Lebanon
- Governorate: South Governorate
- District: Sidon District

Area
  - Total: 0.71 sq mi (1.8 km^{2})
- Elevation: 1,300 ft (400 m)
- Time zone: UTC+2 (EET)
  - Summer (DST): UTC+3 (EEST)

Arab Tabbaya (Arabic: عرب طبايا, romanized: ʿArab Ṭobbāyā) is a municipality in the South Governorate in Lebanon. It is located 57 km south of Beirut and 15 km southeast of Sidon. It is 10 km inland from the Mediterranean, occupying a hill with elevation ranging between 400 and 410 meters above sea level.

== Demographics ==
In 2014, Muslims made up 99.85% of registered voters in Arab Tabbaya. 95.70% of the voters were Sunni Muslims.
