= Khartoum, Lebanon =

Khartoum خرطوم
- Municipality
- Location in Lebanon
- Coordinates: 33°24′31″N 35°22′16″E
- Country: Lebanon
- Governorate: South Governorate
- District: Sidon District
- Time zone: UTC+2 (EET)
  - Summer (DST): UTC+3 (EEST)

Khartoum (Arabic: خرطوم, romanized: Kharṭūm) is a municipality in the Sidon District of the South Governorate in Lebanon.

== History ==
In 1875, during the end of the Ottoman era, Victor Guérin travelled in the area and noted "I arrive at Khartoum, a village of 400 Metualis, situated on a beautiful hill whose slopes are cultivated with fig trees. At the bottom of the village is a oualy dedicated to Neby Haroun."

== Demographics ==
In 2014 Muslims made up 98.62% of registered voters in Khartoum. 96.94% of the voters were Shiite Muslims.

== Bibliography ==
- Guérin, V. (1880). Description Géographique Historique et Archéologique de la Palestine (in French). Vol. 3: Galilee, pt. 2. Paris: L'Imprimerie Nationale.
