= Bqosta =

Village in South Governorate, Lebanon

Bqosta بقسطا
- Municipality
- Location in Lebanon
- Coordinates: 33°34′34″N 35°23′58″E
- Country: Lebanon
- Governorate: South Governorate
- District: Sidon District

Area
  - Land: 2.06 sq mi (5.34 km^{2})
- Elevation: 130 ft (40 m)
- Time zone: UTC+2 (EET)
  - Summer (DST): UTC+3 (EEST)

Bqosta (Arabic: بقسطا, romanized: Bqosṭā) is a municipality in the Sidon District of the South Governorate in Lebanon. It is located 50 kilometres (31 mi) from Beirut.

== History ==
In 1875 Victor Guérin traveled in the region, and noted: "Bekousta, a village of 200 inhabitants, Maronites and United Greeks; it is located on a high hill, between the Oued Naser to the south and the Nahr el-Aouleh to the north.The small church of Bekousta, dedicated to Saint Joseph, contains in its construction a number of ashlars of ancient appearance."

The village remains entirely Maronite and Greek Catholic into the modern day.

== Demographics ==
In 2014 Christians made up 100% of registered voters in Bqosta. 54.70% of the voters were Maronite Catholics and 42.54% were Greek Catholics.

== Bibliography ==
- Guérin, V. (1880). Description Géographique Historique et Archéologique de la Palestine (in French). Vol. 3: Galilee, pt. 2. Paris: L'Imprimerie Nationale.
