= Bramiyeh =

Village in South Governorate, Lebanon

Bramiyeh البرامية Bramieh
- Municipality
- Location in Lebanon
- Coordinates: 33°34′28″N 35°23′31″E
- Country: Lebanon
- Governorate: South Governorate
- District: Sidon District

Area
  - Land: 0.20 sq mi (0.51 km^{2})
- Elevation: 160 ft (50 m)
- Time zone: UTC+2 (EET)
  - Summer (DST): UTC+3 (EEST)

Bramiyeh (Arabic: البرامية, romanized: al-Brāmiyah), also spelled Bramieh, is a municipality in the Sidon District of the South Governorate in Lebanon. It is located 35 kilometres (22 mi) from Beirut.

== History ==
In 1838, Eli Smith noted it as el-Buramlyeh, a village located in "Aklim et-Tuffah, adjacent to Seida".

In 1875 Victor Guérin traveled in the region, and noted about El-Bramieh: "I descend to the north through plantations of fig, pomegranate and lemon trees. [] I walk on a plateau whose soil is very fertile, and [] pass to El-Bramieh, a hamlet of about fifty inhabitants, Druses or Christians. There are some ancient tombs carved into the rock."

== Demographics ==
In 2014, Christians made up 78.19% and Muslims made up 21.36% of registered voters in Bramiyeh. 44.77% of the voters were Maronite Catholics, 28.95% were Greek Catholics and 15,19% were Sunni Muslims.

== Bibliography ==
- Guérin, V. (1880). Description Géographique Historique et Archéologique de la Palestine (in French). Vol. 3: Galilee, pt. 2. Paris: L'Imprimerie Nationale.
- Robinson, E.; Smith, E. (1841). Biblical Researches in Palestine, Mount Sinai and Arabia Petraea: A Journal of Travels in the year 1838. Vol. 2. Boston: Crocker & Brewster.
