= Babliyeh =

Babliyeh بابلية
- Municipality
- Location in Lebanon
- Country: Lebanon
- Governorate: South Governorate
- District: Sidon District
- Time zone: UTC+2 (EET)
  - Summer (DST): EEST

Babliyeh (Arabic: بابلية, romanized: al-Bābliyah) is a municipality in the Sidon District in Lebanon. It is located 62 km southeast of Beirut, the capital of Lebanon. It rises about 200 m above sea level and extends over an area estimated at 1273 hectares.

== History ==
In 1875, during the end of the Ottoman era, Victor Guérin visited and described the village (which he called Bablieh): "It is seated on a hill, north of a wadi, and contains 500 Metualis. The houses are very roughly built. I notice, in two small mosques half demolished, a number of beautiful stones of antique appearance. Large plantations of fig trees surround this village."

== Demographics ==
In 2014, Muslims made up 99.34% of registered voters in Babliyeh. 98.29% of the voters were Shiite Muslims.

== Bibliography ==
- Guérin, V. (1880). Description Géographique Historique et Archéologique de la Palestine (in French). Vol. 3: Galilee, pt. 2. Paris: L'Imprimerie Nationale.
