= Aaddousiyyeh =

Aaddousiyyeh العدوسية Addoussieh
- Municipality
- Location in Lebanon
- Coordinates: 33°28′09″N 35°20′40″E
- Country: Lebanon
- Governorate: South Governorate
- District: Sidon District
- Time zone: UTC+2 (EET)
  - Summer (DST): UTC+3 (EEST)

Aaddousiyyeh (Arabic: العدوسية, romanized: al-ʿAddūssiyeh), also spelled Addoussieh, is a municipality in the Sidon District of the South Governorate in Lebanon.

== History ==
In 1875, in the late Ottoman era, Victor Guérin traveled in the region, and arrived at "A'ddousieh, a small village inhabited by a few Christian families, some Greek united, others Greek schismatics. Several cisterns and tombs dug into the rock in the form of pits indicate that this hamlet succeeded an ancient locality. To the north and at the bottom of the hill where it rises, is an abundant spring, in a valley planted with oranges and pomegranate trees."

== Demographics ==
In 2014, Christians made up 98.54% of registered voters in Aaddousiyyeh. 54.11% of the voters were Greek Catholics and 42.18% were Maronite Catholics.

== Bibliography ==
- Guérin, V. (1880). Description Géographique Historique et Archéologique de la Palestine (in French). Vol. 3: Galilee, pt. 2. Paris: L'Imprimerie Nationale.
