= Aaqtanit =

Municipality in Sidon District, Lebanon

Aaqtanit عقتانيت
- Municipality
- Location in Lebanon
- Country: Lebanon
- Governorate: South Governorate
- District: Sidon District

Area
  - Total: 4.57 sq mi (11.8 km^{2})
- Elevation: 490 ft (150 m)
- Time zone: UTC+2 (EET)
  - Summer (DST): UTC+3 (EEST)

Aaqtanit (Arabic: عقتانيت, romanized: ʿAqtānīt) is a municipality in the Sidon District in Lebanon. It is located 53 km southeast of Beirut.

== History ==
In 1875 Victor Guérin noted on his travels in the region: "I stop for a few moments at A'ktenit. This village has a population of 400 Maronites. The church, dedicated to St. George, is of recent date. Near there, I notice the ruins of a small fort, of which there is still a section of wall, 26 steps long and built with huge blocks, some completely flattened, the others raised with bossing. At the bottom we can see the remains of an ancient reservoir, now filled, next to a spring called A'ïn A'ktenit."

== Demographics ==
In 2014, Christians made up 97.70% of registered voters in Aaqtanit. 86.83% of the voters were Maronite Catholics.

== Bibliography ==
- Guérin, V. (1880). Description Géographique Historique et Archéologique de la Palestine (in French). Vol. 3: Galilee, pt. 2. Paris: L'Imprimerie Nationale.
