= Merouaniyeh =

Merouaniyeh المروانية Al-Marwanieh
- Municipality
- Location within Lebanon
- Coordinates: 33°26′54″N 35°22′54″E
- Grid position: 116/173 L
- Country: Lebanon
- Governorate: South Governorate
- District: Sidon District

Area
  - Total: 3.05 sq mi (7.9 km^{2})
- Elevation: 750 ft (230 m)
- Time zone: UTC+2 (EET)
  - Summer (DST): UTC+3 (EEST)

Merouaniyeh (Arabic: المروانية, romanized: al-Marwāniyah) is a municipality in the Sidon District in Lebanon.

== Demographics ==
In 2014, Muslims made up 99.59% of registered voters in Merouaniyeh. 98.26% of the voters were Shiite Muslims.
