= Zaita =

Village in South Governorate, Lebanon

Zaita زيتا Zeita
- Municipality
- Location in Lebanon
- Coordinates: 33°29′59″N 35°24′15″E
- Country: Lebanon
- Governorate: South Governorate
- District: Sidon District

Area
  - Land: 0.84 sq mi (2.18 km^{2})
- Elevation: 980 ft (300 m)
- Time zone: UTC+2 (EET)
  - Summer (DST): UTC+3 (EEST)

Zaita (Arabic: زيتا, romanized: Zaytā) is a municipality in the Sidon District of the South Governorate in Lebanon. It is located 55 kilometres (34 mi) from Beirut.

== History ==
The place name ends with a long vowel -ā which reflects the Aramaic absolute state, a morphological feature commonly attested in Palestinian toponyms.

In 1875 Victor Guérin traveled in the region, and he "reached Zeita, a village that crowns a high hill and whose name seems ancient. Its population is 200, all Métualis."

== Demographics ==
In 2014, Muslims made up 99.31% of registered voters in Zaita. 96.53% of the voters were Shiite Muslims.

== Bibliography ==
- Guérin, V. (1880). Description Géographique Historique et Archéologique de la Palestine (in French). Vol. 3: Galilee, pt. 2. Paris: L'Imprimerie Nationale.
