= Kfar Chellal =

Kfar Chellal كفرشلال Kfar Shellal
- Municipality
- Location in Lebanon
- Coordinates: 33°29′26″N 35°27′58″E
- Country: Lebanon
- Governorate: South Governorate
- District: Sidon
- Time zone: UTC+2 (EET)
  - Summer (DST): +3

Kfar Chellal (Arabic: كفرشلال) is a municipality in the Sidon District of the South Governorate in Lebanon.

== Demographics ==
In 2014 Christians made up 99.36% of registered voters in Kfar Chellal. 90.38% of the voters were Maronite Catholics.
