= Loubieh =

Municipality in Lebanon

Loubieh اللوبية Al-Loubieh
- Municipality
- Location in Lebanon
- Coordinates: 33°25′32″N 35°17′00″E
- Country: Lebanon
- Governorate: South Governorate
- District: Sidon District
- Time zone: UTC+2 (EET)
  - Summer (DST): +3

Loubieh, or Al-Loubieh (Arabic: اللوبية, romanized: al-Lūbiyeh) is a municipality in south Lebanon 62 km from and 20 km south of Sidon, 21 km north of Tyre, area 2.23 km^{2}, altitude 144 m.

Loubieh is also the name for a traditional Lebanese mezze made from green beans, tomatoes, onions, garlic and salt, all sauteed in olive oil.

== Demographics ==
In 2014, Muslims made up 99.46% of registered voters in Loubieh. 97.84% of the voters were Shiite Muslims.
