= Ghassaniyeh, Lebanon =

Ghassaniyeh الغسانية Ghassanieh
- Municipality
- Location in Lebanon
- Coordinates: 33.4176°N 35.3584°E
- Grid position: 117/164 L
- Country: Lebanon
- Governorate: South Governorate
- District: Sidon District
- Elevation: 1,300 ft (400 m)
- Time zone: UTC+2 (EET)
  - Summer (DST): UTC+3 (EEST)
- Postal code: 2018
- Area code: 07

Ghassaniyeh (Levantine Arabic: الغسانية, romanized: al-Ghassāniyeh) is a municipality in southern Lebanon with a population of about 8000 . It is 14 kilometres southeast of Sidon, bordered by Kawatria Al Sayyad to the east, Al Babebliah to the west, Kakyiat Sanawbar to the northwest, and Khartoum to the southeast. The name of the town, Ghassaniyeh, is derived from the clan of Alghassasina.

== History ==
In 1875, during the end of the Ottoman era, Victor Guérin travelled in the area and noted the village (which he called Rhassanieh), situated on a dominating position on the northern bank of a wadi. It was inhabited by the Metualis.

== Economy ==
The town of Ghassaniyeh was originally an industrial town, manufacturing brooms and brushes for the Lebanese market. Immigration started in the 19th century and intensified during World War I, with a group of young men emigrating to Latin America to escape conscription in the Ottoman Empire army.

This emigration continued through the 20th century and again intensified during the 1940s and 1950s, this time to West Africa, where the immigrants engaged in trade and industry.

In a second wave of immigration, many returned to Lebanon, some temporarily and some permanently, to join the booming construction business. Ghassaniyeh companies were involved in commercial and residential construction in Beirut and its suburbs for more than 60 years.

The third wave of emigration was focussed mainly on education in Europe, Canada, and the US. Today, a large group of engineers, medical doctors, and management professionals in ISO and other international standards are involved in spreading a culture of knowledge and continuous development.

=== Modern era ===
On 7 August 2006, during the 2006 Lebanon War, Israeli war planes killed seven people in the village.

== Demographics ==
In 2014, Muslims made up 99.26% of registered voters in Ghassaniyeh. 98.18% of the voters were Shiite Muslims.

== Bibliography ==
- Guérin, V. (1880). Description Géographique Historique et Archéologique de la Palestine (in French). Vol. 3: Galilee, pt. 2. Paris: L'Imprimerie Nationale.
- HRW (2007). Why They Died: Civilian Casualties in Lebanon During the 2006 War. Human Rights Watch.
