= Darb es Sim =

Darb es Sim درب السيم Darb as-Sim
- Municipality
- Location in Lebanon
- Coordinates: 33°32′06″N 35°22′53″E
- Country: Lebanon
- Governorate: South Governorate
- District: Sidon District
- Time zone: UTC+2 (EET)
  - Summer (DST): UTC+3 (EEST)

Darb es Sim (Arabic: درب السيم, romanized: Darb as-Sīm) is a municipality in the Sidon District of the South Governorate in Lebanon.

== History ==
In 1875 Victor Guérin visited and described it: "I arrive at the village of Derb es-Sin, also known as Deir es-Sin. Inhabited by 300 Maronites, it must have succeeded an ancient settlement. A few plantations of mulberry, orange, and fig trees are nearby."

== Demographics ==
In 2014, Christians made up 98.14% of registered voters in Darb es Sim. 79.76% of the voters were Maronite Catholics.

== Bibliography ==
- Guérin, V. (1880). Description Géographique Historique et Archéologique de la Palestine (in French). Vol. 3: Galilee, pt. 2. Paris: L'Imprimerie Nationale.
