= Sidon District =

Coordinates: 33.5614°N 35.375°E

Sidon District قضاء صيدا
- District
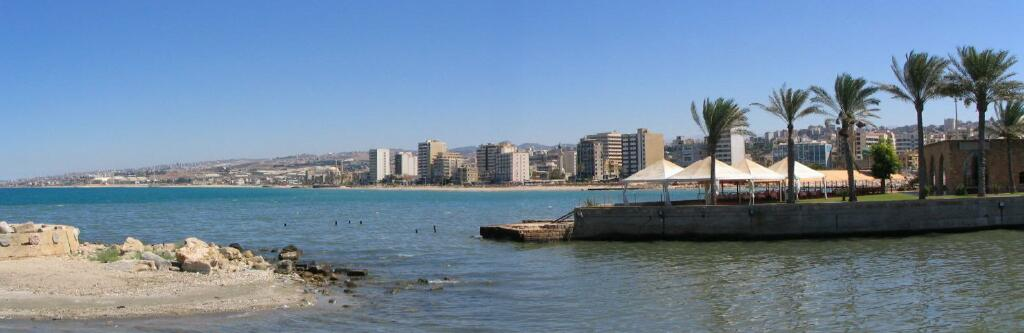
- Sidon coast

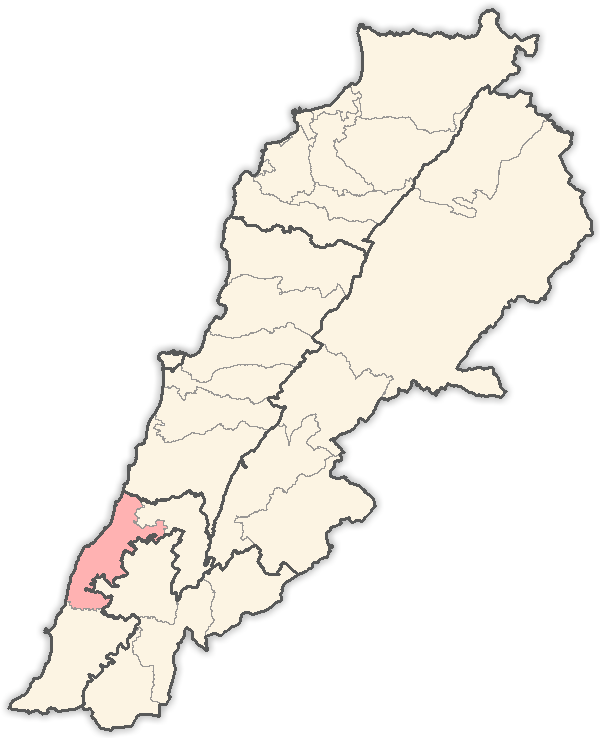
- Location in Lebanon
- Country: Lebanon
- Governorate: South Governorate
- Capital: Sidon

Area
  - Total: 106 sq mi (275 km^{2})

Population
  - Estimate (31 December 2017): 287,987
- Time zone: UTC+2 (EET)
  - Summer (DST): UTC+3 (EEST)

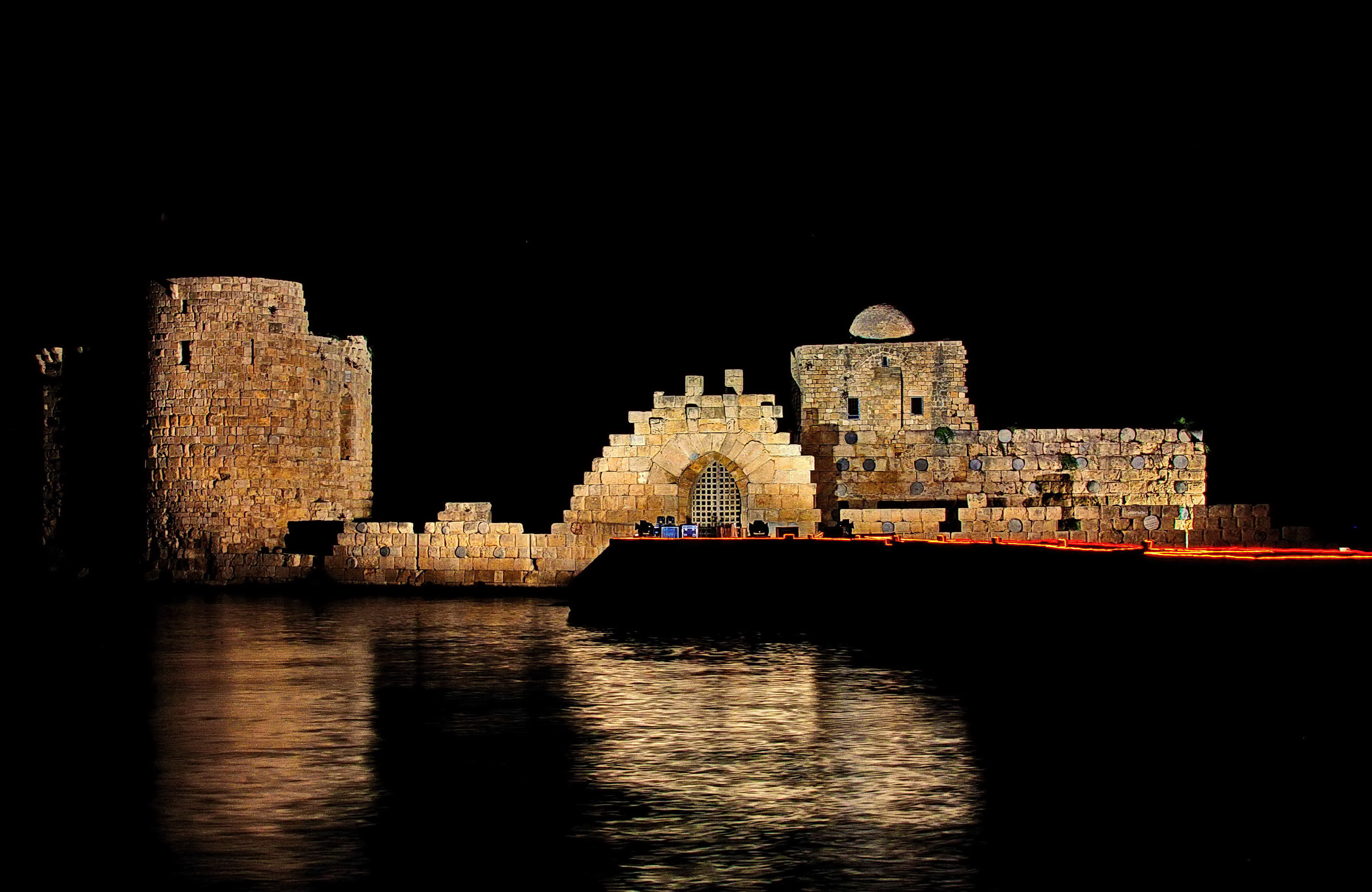
Saida Sea Castle, Sidon District

The Sidon District (Arabic: قضاء صيدا) is a district within the South Governorate of Lebanon.

== Municipalities ==
The following 53 municipalities are all located in the Sidon District:

- Aabra
- Al-Aaddoussiyah
- Aadloun
- Aanqoun
- Aaqtanit
- Ain ad-Delb
- Ansariyah
- Arab aj-Jall
- Arzay
- Al-Babliyah
- Al-Baisariyah
- Banaafoul
- Barti
- Bqosta
- Al-Bramiyah
- Darb as-Sim
- Al-Ghassaniyah
- Al-Ghaziyah
- Al-Hajjah
- Haret Saida
- Al-Helaliyah
- Irkay
- Jenjlaya
- Kaouthariyat as-Siyad
- Kfar Beit
- Kfar Chellal
- Kfar Hatta
- Kfar Melki
- Kfaraya
- Al-Kharayeb
- Khartoum
- Khaziz
- Al-Loubiyah
- Al-Maamriyah
- Maghdouché
- Majdelyoun
- Al-Marwaniyah
- Miye
- An-Najjariyah
- Qaqaaiyet as-Snoubar
- Qennarit
- Al-Qraiyah
- Al-Qunaitra
- As-Saksakiyah
- As-Salhiyah
- As-Sarafand
- Sidon
- Tanbourit
- Teffahta
- Tobbaya
- Zaghdraiya
- Zaita
- Az-Zrariyah

== Oil and petroleum ==
Sidon serves as the Mediterranean terminus of the Trans-Arabian Pipeline, a 1,720 km (1,068.76 mi) long oil pipeline that pumps oil from the fields near Abqaiq in Saudi Arabia. The pipeline played an important role in the global trade of petroleum—helping with the economic development of Lebanon—as well as American and Middle Eastern political relations. At the time it was built in 1947, the project was considered ground-breaking and innovative with a maximum capacity of about 500,000 barrels per day (79,000 m^{3}/d). After the 1967 Six-Day War and due to constant bickering between Saudi Arabia and Syria and Lebanon over transit fees, the emergence of oil supertankers and pipeline breakdowns, the section of the line beyond Jordan ceased operation in 1976.

The city of Sidon is the site of a large-scale oil facility constituting oil-storage tanks, an oil refinery, a thermal power plant and a fuel port. During the Lebanese civil war and the Israeli invasions, the site was bombarded several times either by Israeli war-planes or by Palestinian militia groups which lead eventually to the closure of the site. The oil tank and the refinery are in severe conditions but are now undergoing a massive rehabilitation plan put down by the Ministry of Power and Water Resources, as well as those in Tripoli in the north, to store Lebanon's future oil and natural gas supplies recently discovered offshore. For now, the facilities that still work on the site are the thermal power plant and the fuel port, which the state began to use to import oil after the pipeline ceased work in the 1970s.

== Demographics ==
According to registered voters in 2014:

Year	Christians				Muslims				Druze
Year	Total	Greek Catholics	Maronites	Other Christians	Total	Shias	Sunnis	Alawites	Druze
2014	17.42%	8.15%	7.72%	1.55%	82.16%	50.09%	32.07%	0.01%	0.05%
2022	18.7%	8.73%	8.24%	1.73%	81.28%	50.21%	31.07%	0.00%	0.02%

Number of registered voters (21+ years old) over the years.

Years	Women	Men	Total	Growth (%)
2009	75,569	71,335	146,904	—N/a
2010	77,073 ▲	73,120 ▲	150,193 ▲	+2.19 ▲
2011	77,963 ▲	74,573 ▲	152,536 ▲	+1.54% ▼
2012	79,285 ▲	76,119 ▲	155,404 ▲	+1.85% ▲
2013	81,475 ▲	77,981 ▲	159,456 ▲	2.54% ▲
2014	82,968 ▲	79,611 ▲	162,579 ▲	+1.92% ▼
2015	84,645 ▲	81,350 ▲	165,995 ▲	+2.06% ▲
2016	86,062 ▲	83,543 ▲	169,605 ▲	+2.13% ▲
2017	87,624 ▲	85,062 ▲	172,686 ▲	+1.78% ▼
2018	89,724 ▲	86,514 ▲	176,238 ▲	+2.02% ▲
2019	91,551 ▲	87,987 ▲	179,538 ▲	+1.84% ▼
2020	93,494 ▲	89,467 ▲	182,961 ▲	+1.87% ▼
2021	95,368 ▲	91,140 ▲	186,508 ▲	+1.90% ▲
2022	97,353 ▲	92,693 ▲	190,046 ▲	+1.86% ▼
2023	98,487 ▲	93,644 ▲	192,131 ▲	+1.09% ▼
2024	99,955 ▲	95,037 ▲	194,992 ▲	+1.47% ▲
2025	101,404 ▲	96,173 ▲	197,577 ▲	+1.31% ▼
2026	—N/a	—N/a	200,467 ▲	+1.44% ▲
Source: DGCS
