= Kfar Melki =

Kfar Melki كفر ملكي
- Municipality
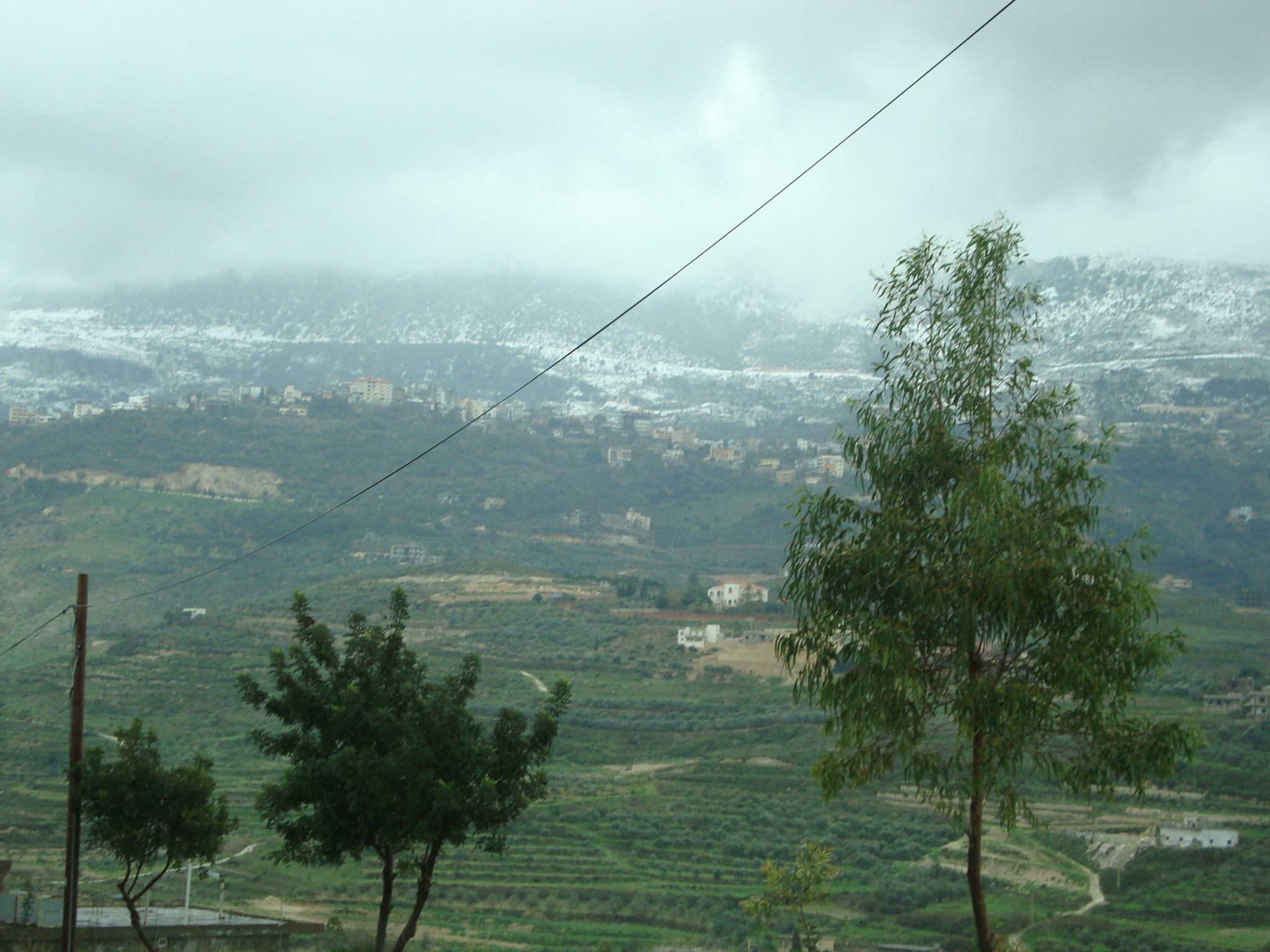
- Snow covering Jabal Safi, view from Kfar Melki Feb. 2010

- Location in Lebanon
- Coordinates: 33°30′00″N 35°28′48″E
- Country: Lebanon
- Governorate: South Governorate
- District: Sidon District
- Elevation: 1,380 ft (420 m)
- Time zone: UTC+2 (EET)
  - Summer (DST): UTC+3 (EEST)
- Postal code: 2018
- Area code: 07

Kfar Melki (Arabic: كفر ملكي, romanized: Kfar Milkī), also known as Kafrmelki or Kfarmilki, is a municipality in the Sidon District, South Governorate, Lebanon. It is situated 11 kilometres east of Sidon.

Kfar Melki is located in the Kaza of Saida one of Mohafazah of South Lebanon kazas (districts). Mohafazah of South Lebanon is one of the eight mohafazats (governorates) of Lebanon. It's 58 kilometers (36 miles) away from (Beirut) the capital of Lebanon. It is 500 meters (1,600 feet; 550 yards) above sea level. Kfarmelki surface stretches for 673 ha (6.73 km^{2}; 2.60 sq mi)

== Demographics ==
In 2014, Muslims made up 99.24% of registered voters in Kfar Melki. 97.57% of the voters were Shiite Muslims.

== Notable people ==
- Mahmoud Hamoud, football player and coach
- Ahmad Kheir El Dine, footballer
