= Kfar Beit =

Kfar Beit كفربيت Kfarbeit
- Municipality
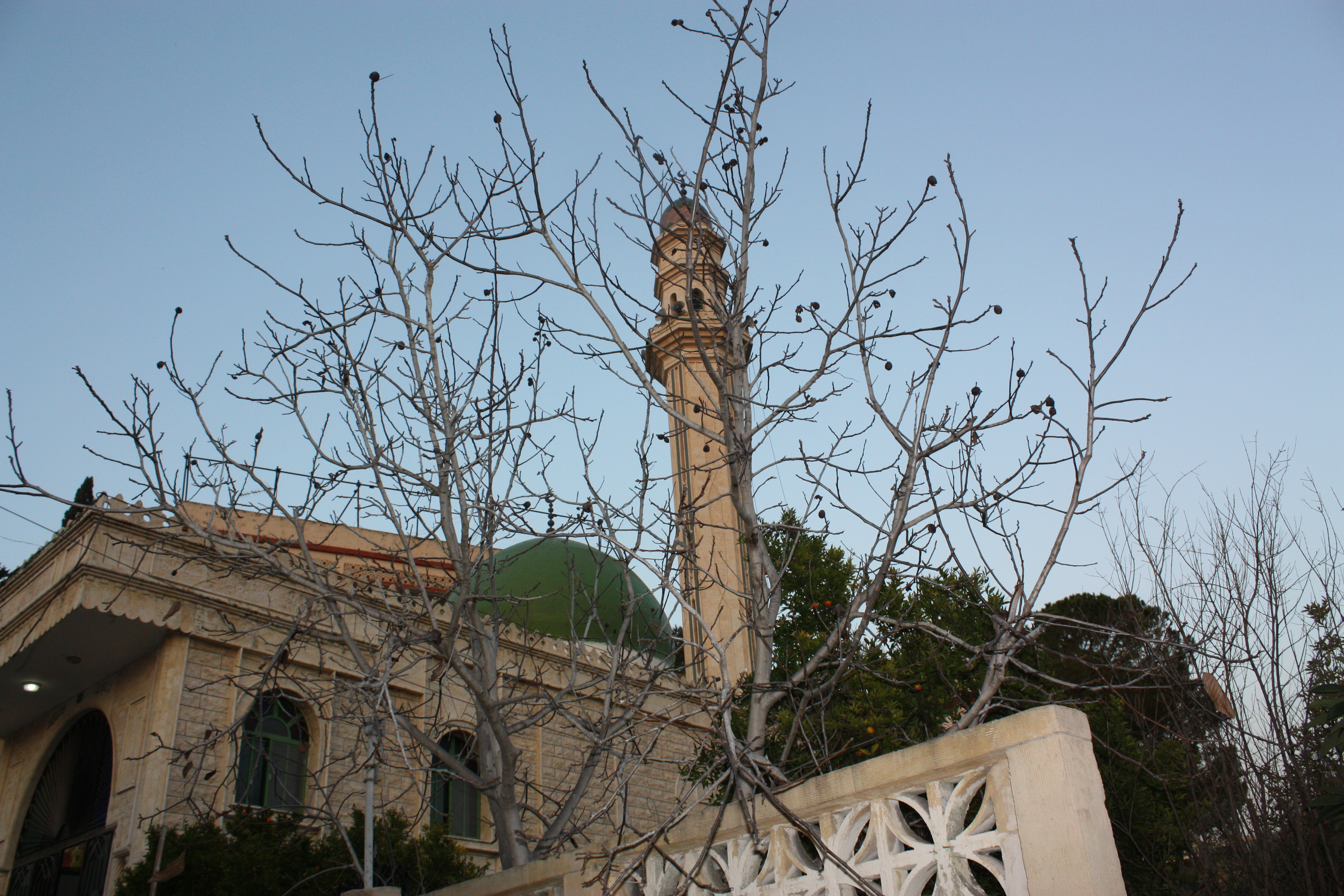
- Kfar Beit

- Location within Lebanon
- Coordinates: 33.495721°N 35.461252°E
- Country: Lebanon
- Governorate: South Governorate
- District: Sidon District

Kfar Beit (Arabic: كفربيت), also known as Kfar Beït, Kafr Bayt or Kfarbeit, is a Lebanese municipality in the south of Lebanon. It is close to the city of Saida. Kfar Beit has an average elevation of 374 meters or 1,227 feet.

The closest airport is the Rafic Hariri International Airport

== Demographics ==
In 2014, Muslims made up 98.89% of registered voters in Kfar Beit. 97.33% of the voters were Shiite Muslims.
