= Qennarit =

Human settlement in Lebanon

Qennarit قناريت
- Municipality
- Location in Lebanon
- Grid position: 116/173 L
- Country: Lebanon
- Governorate: South Governorate
- District: Sidon District

Area
  - Total: 3.05 sq mi (7.9 km^{2})
- Elevation: 750 ft (230 m)
- Time zone: UTC+2 (EET)
  - Summer (DST): UTC+3 (EEST)

Qennarit (Levantine Arabic: قناريت, romanized: Qennārīt) is a municipality in the Sidon District in Lebanon. It is located 51 km southeast of Beirut.

== History ==
In 1875, Victor Guérin noted about the village: "Kennarit, a village inhabited by Metualis and which succeeded an ancient locality, as evidenced by a reservoir dug into the rock, several sepulchral caves and ancient quarries."

== Demographics ==
In 2014, Muslims made up 99.69% of registered voters in Qennarit. 95.29% of the voters were Shiite Muslims.

== Bibliography ==
- Guérin, V. (1880). Description Géographique Historique et Archéologique de la Palestine (in French). Vol. 3: Galilee, pt. 2. Paris: L'Imprimerie Nationale.
