= Sarafand, Lebanon =

Sarafand الصرفند
- Municipality
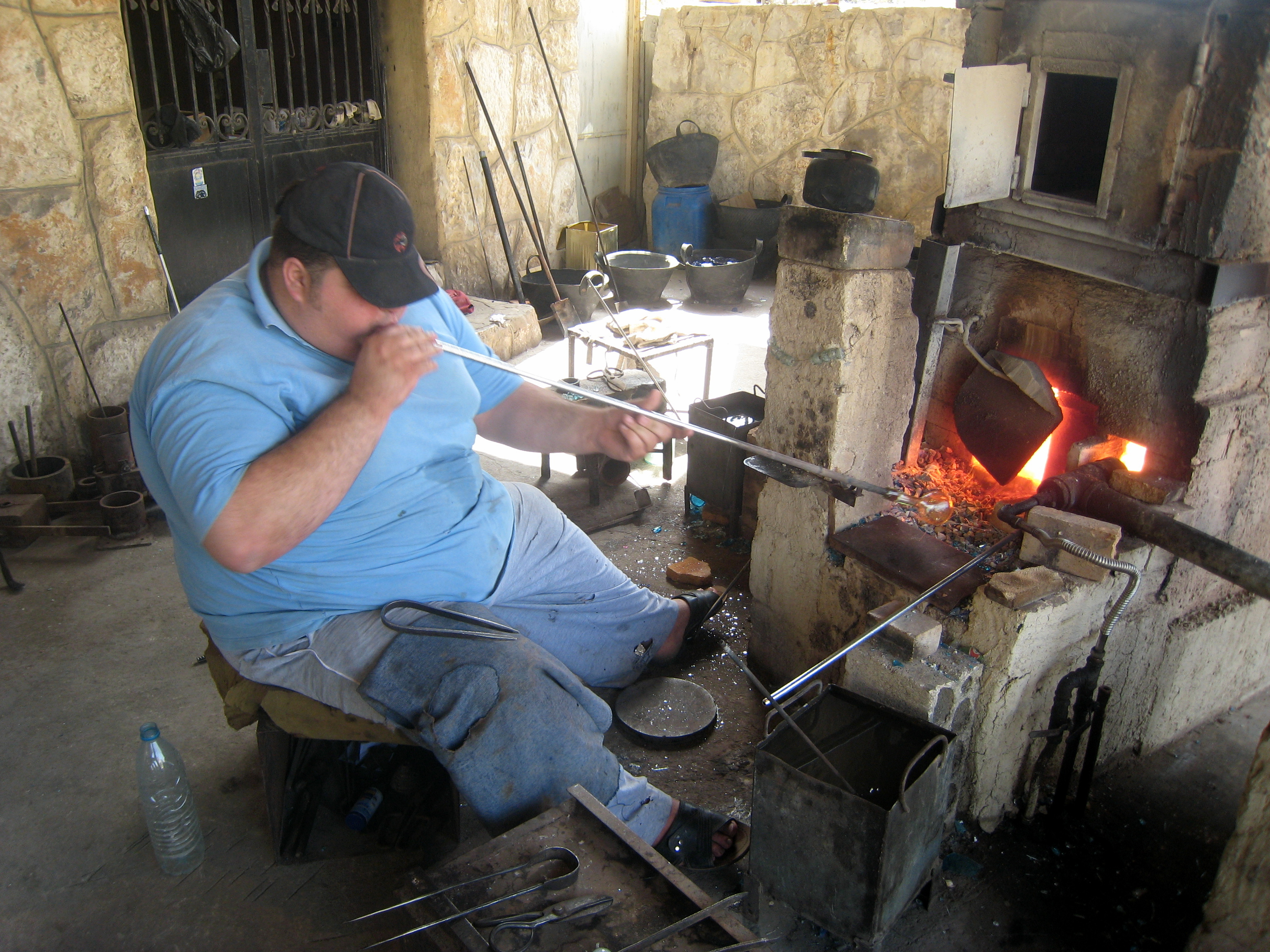
- Glassmaking in Sarafand

- Location in Lebanon
- Coordinates: 33°27′06″N 35°17′27″E
- Country: Lebanon
- Governorate: South Governorate
- District: Sidon District

Government
  - Type: Mayor–council
- Elevation: 70 m (230 ft)

Population (2004)
  - Total: 10,965
- Time zone: UTC+2 (EET)
  - Summer (DST): UTC+3 (EEST)
- Dialing code: 00961 (7) Landline

Sarafand (Arabic: الصرفند, romanized: aṣ-Ṣarafand) is a municipality in southern Lebanon located 10 km south of Sidon overlooking the Mediterranean Sea.

== Etymology ==
Sarafand is an Arabic rendition of the Phoenician place-name Ṣrpt, after Classical Sarepta, just north of Sarafand.

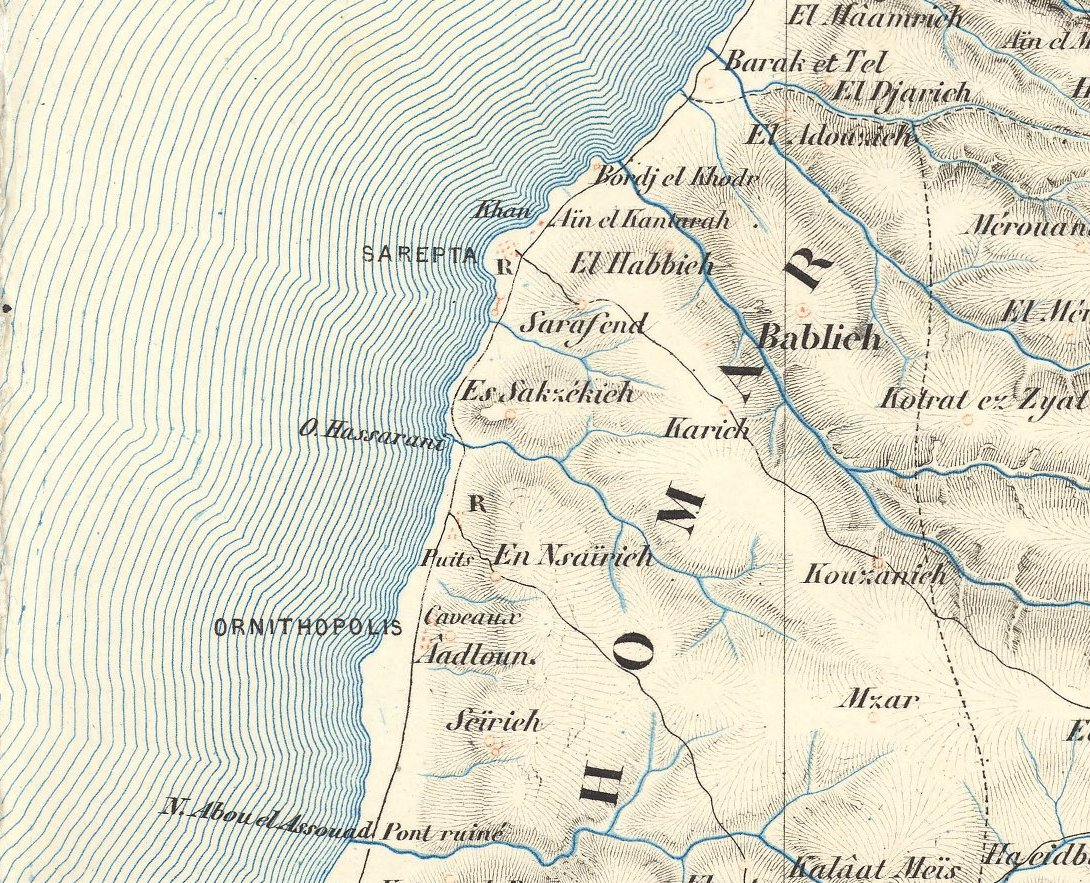
Sarepta and Sarafand in the 1862 Carte du Liban

== History ==
In 1875 Victor Guérin noted that the village had 400 Métualis inhabitants.

In mid-April 1980 Israeli commandos, arriving by sea, raided Sarafand killing twenty Lebanese and Palestinians, mostly civilians. During the first three weeks of April the Israelis carried out similar, but smaller, raids along the coast road between Sidon and Tyre, killing thirteen people.

On 7 June 1982, on the second day of the Israeli invasion of Lebanon an IDF brigade was ambushed as it pushed through Sarafand. Two Israeli soldiers were killed and one seriously wounded.

== Demographics ==
In 2014, Muslims made up 99.63% of registered voters in Sarafand. 96.90% of the voters were Shiite Muslims.

== Notable people ==
- Mohammad El Hayek (born 2000), Lebanese footballer
- Mahmoud Zbib (born 2004), Lebanese footballer

== Bibliography ==
- Guérin, V. (1880). Description Géographique Historique et Archéologique de la Palestine (in French). Vol. 3: Galilee, pt. 2. Paris: L'Imprimerie Nationale.
