= Kfar Jarra =

Village in the Jezzine District of southern Lebanon

Kfar Jarra كفرجرة Kfarjarra
- Municipality
- Location in Lebanon
- Coordinates: 33°32′53″N 35°26′02″E
- Country: Lebanon
- Governorate: South Governorate
- District: Jezzine District

Area
  - Total: 0.41 sq mi (1.07 km^{2})
- Elevation: 950 ft (290 m)
- Time zone: UTC+2 (EET)
  - Summer (DST): +3

Kfar Jarra (Arabic: كفرجرة) is a municipality in the Jezzine District of the South Governorate of Lebanon, about 50 km south of Beirut.

== Etymology ==
The name of the village is believed to mean 'spring village' in Syriac.

== History ==
In 1838, Eli Smith noted Kefr Jerra, as a village located in "Aklim et-Tuffah, adjacent to Seida".

In 1875, Victor Guérin travelled in the area, and noted: "I arrive at Kefr Djerra, a village of about twenty Maronite families, on a hill whose slopes are occupied by orchards. Several ancient cisterns dug into the rock and some of the materials that were used to build the church, which I am told is one hundred and forty years old, prove that this village succeeded another older one."

== Demographics ==
In 2014, Christians made up 99.19% of registered voters in Kfar Jarra. 90.03% of the voters were Maronite Catholics.

== Bibliography ==
- Guérin, V. (1880). Description Géographique Historique et Archéologique de la Palestine (in French). Vol. 3: Galilee, pt. 2. Paris: L'Imprimerie Nationale.
- Robinson, E.; Smith, E. (1841). Biblical Researches in Palestine, Mount Sinai and Arabia Petraea: A Journal of Travels in the year 1838. Vol. 3. Boston: Crocker & Brewster.
