= Temples of the Beqaa Valley =

Shrines and Roman temples in the Beqaa Valley in Lebanon

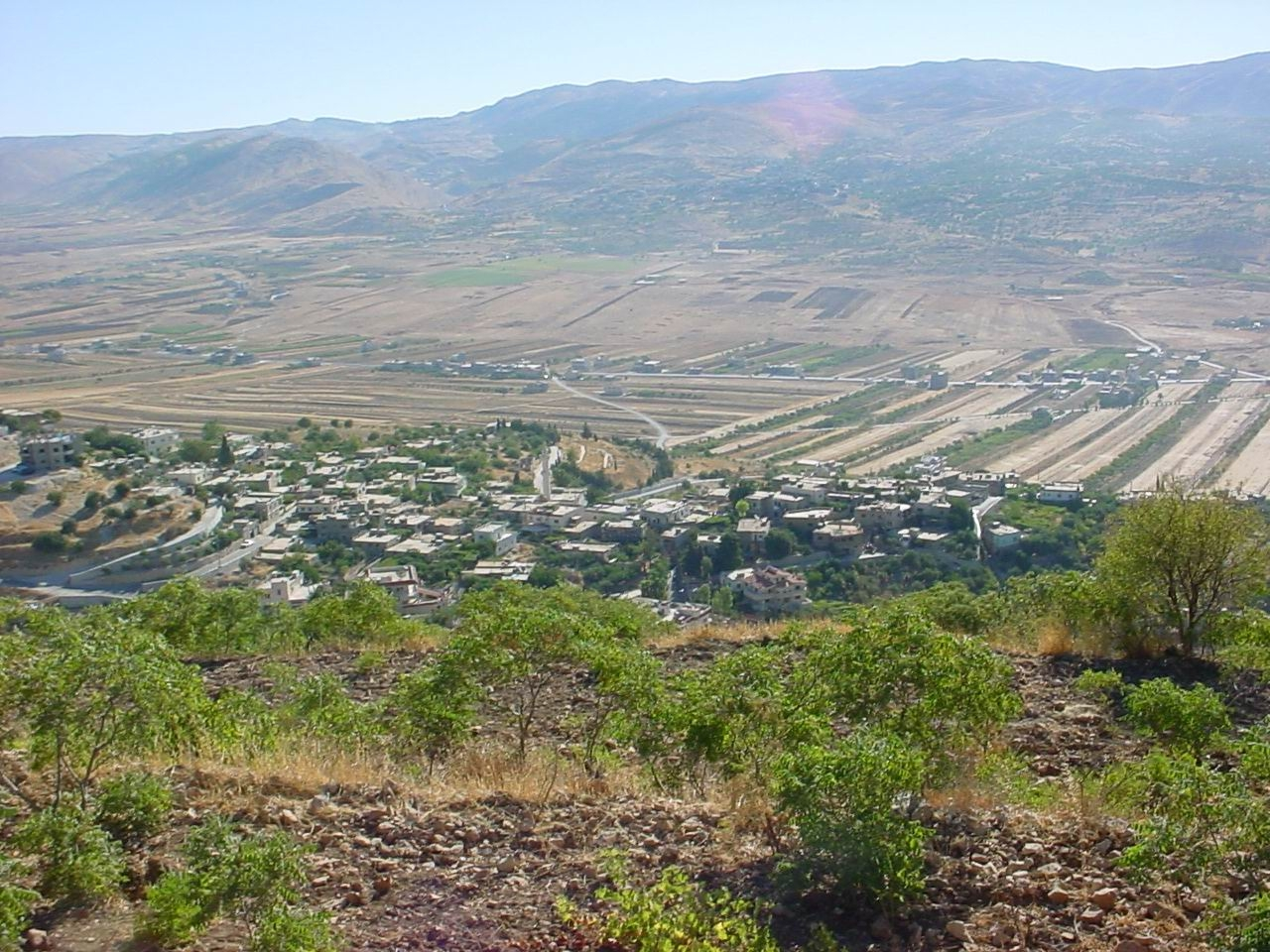
View across the Beqaa Valley, Lebanon

The Temples of the Beqaa Valley are a number of shrines and Roman temples that are dispersed around the Beqaa Valley in Lebanon. The most important and famous are those in Roman Heliopolis. A few temples are built on former buildings of the Phoenician & Hellenistic era, but all are considered to be of Roman construction and were started to be abandoned after the fourth century with the fall of the Roman Paganism.

== Historical development ==
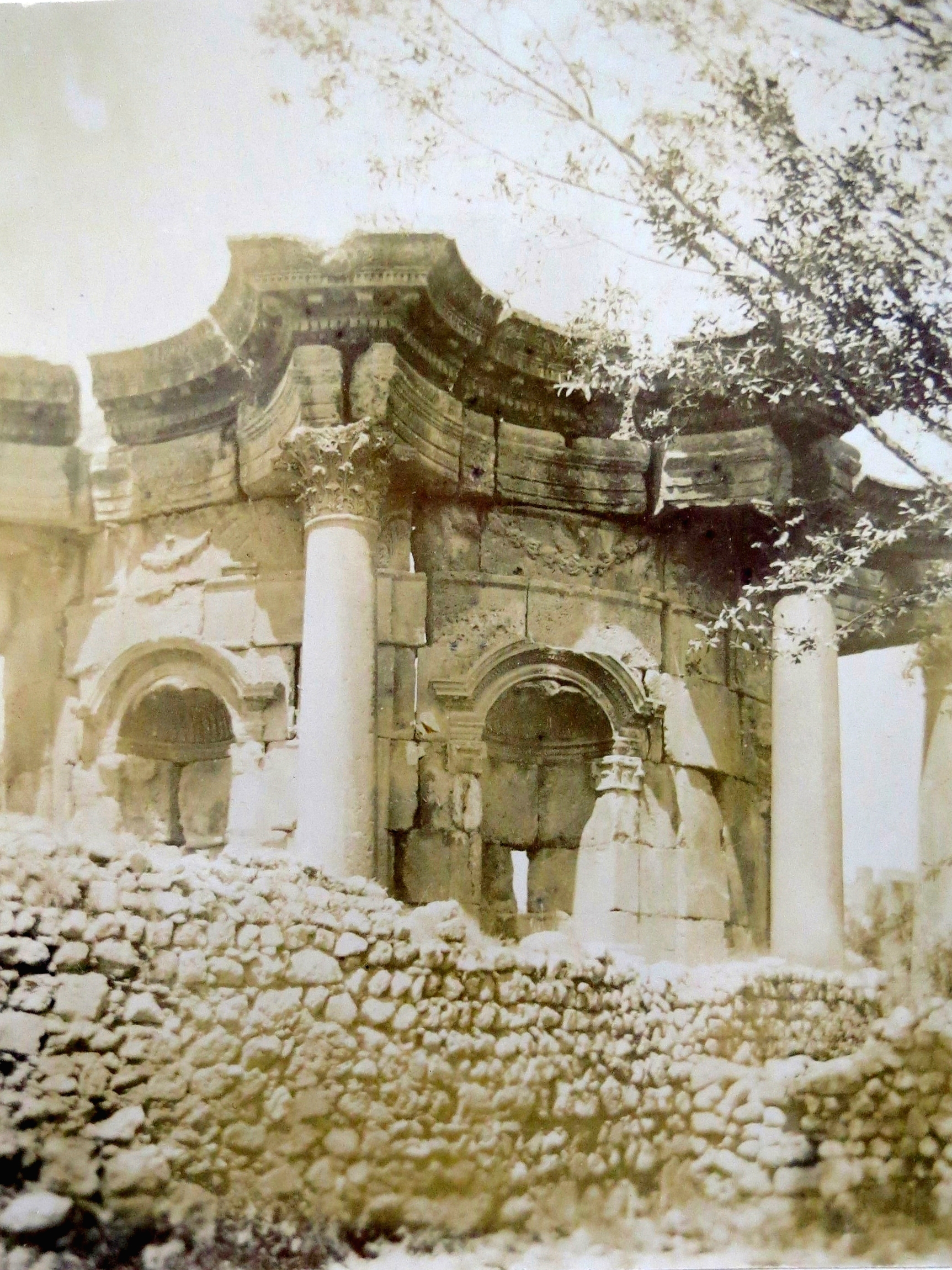
The Basilica of Constantine in 1891 at Heliopolis, formed over the ruins of the "Temple of Venus"

During the early Roman empire the area was chosen to create huge pagan temples of Roman deities, in order to show the "greatness" of the empire of Rome in Phoenicia.

After the end of the first century CE, the territory became jointly controlled by the cities of Damascus, Sidon and Paneas. It is thought that the area was inhabited continuously until the third century CE. Although the sites may have been built on previous layers of architecture, the current temples are predominantly considered to be of Roman construction and were largely abandoned after the fourth century CE during the Byzantine era.

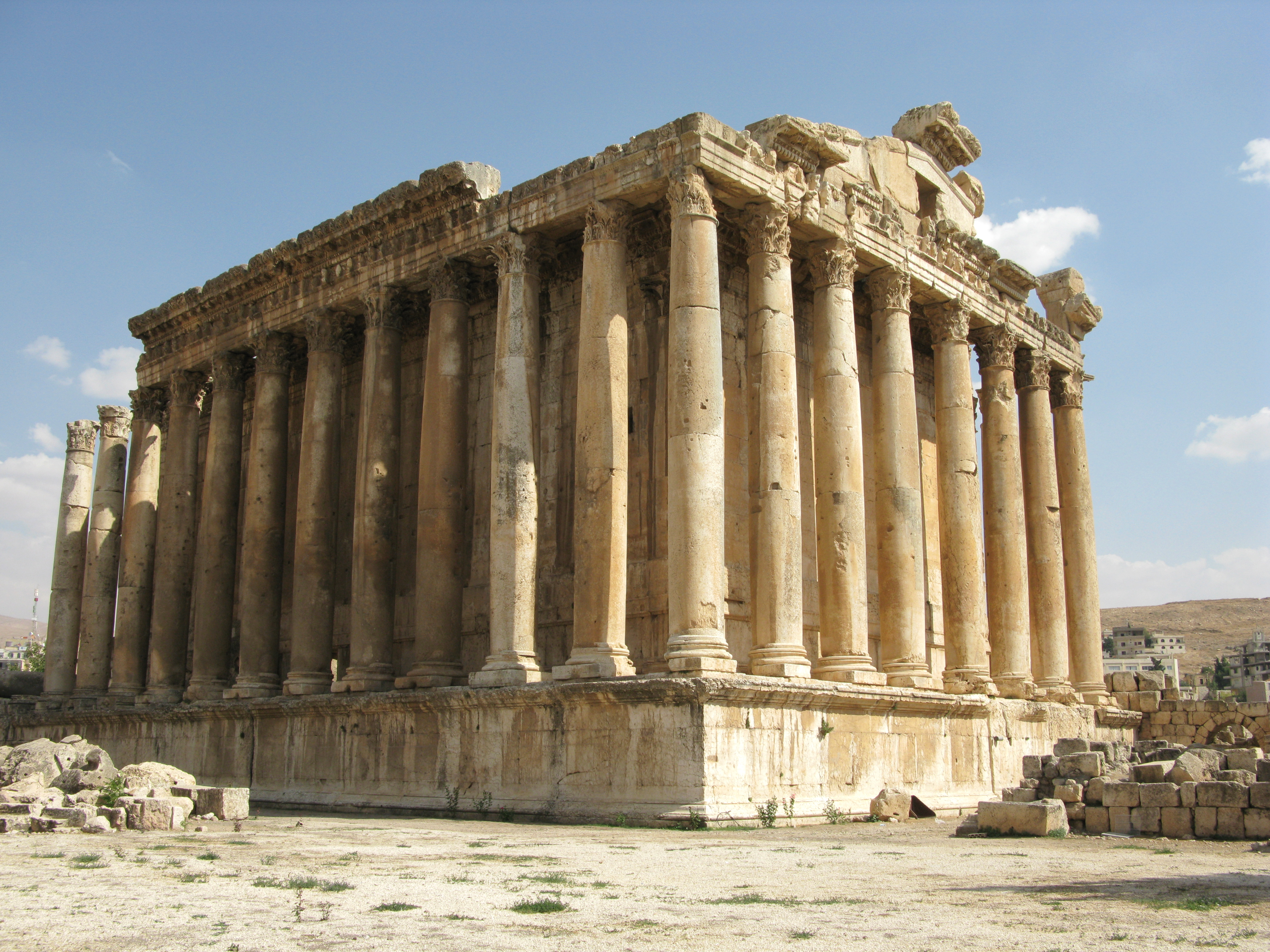
Temple of Bacchus, Baalbek

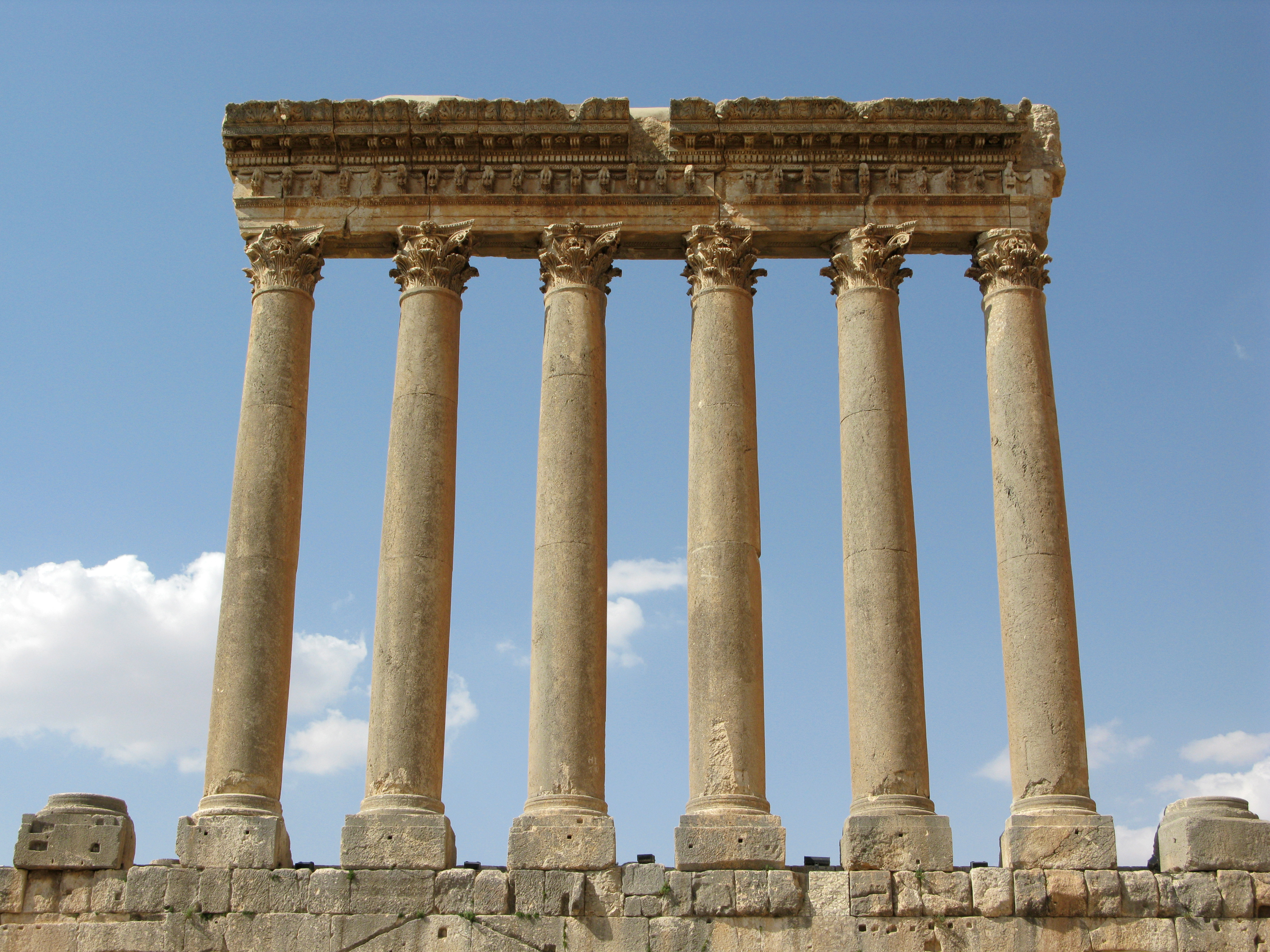
Temple of Jupiter, Baalbek

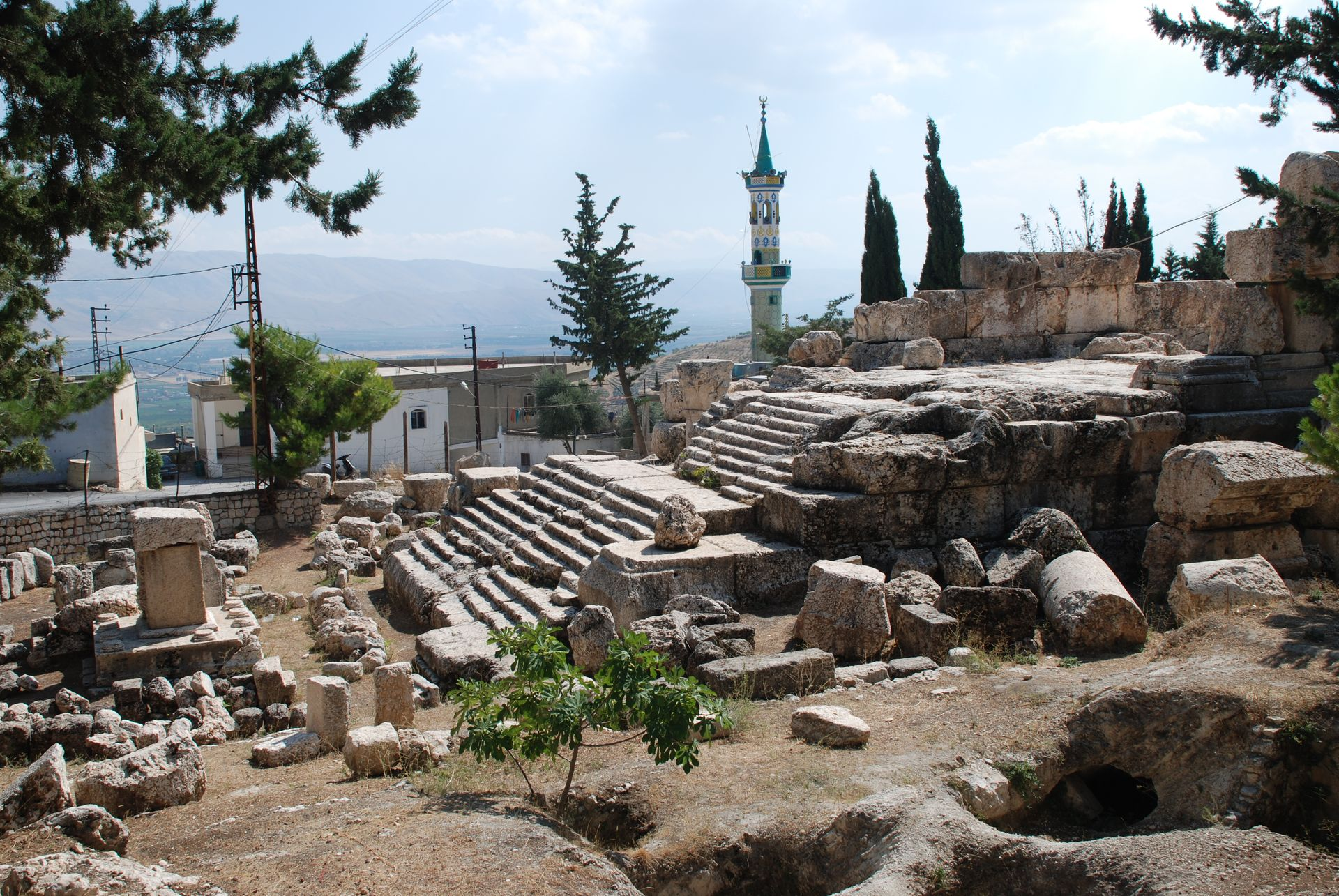
Roman temple of Qsarnaba, near Zahle, Lebanon

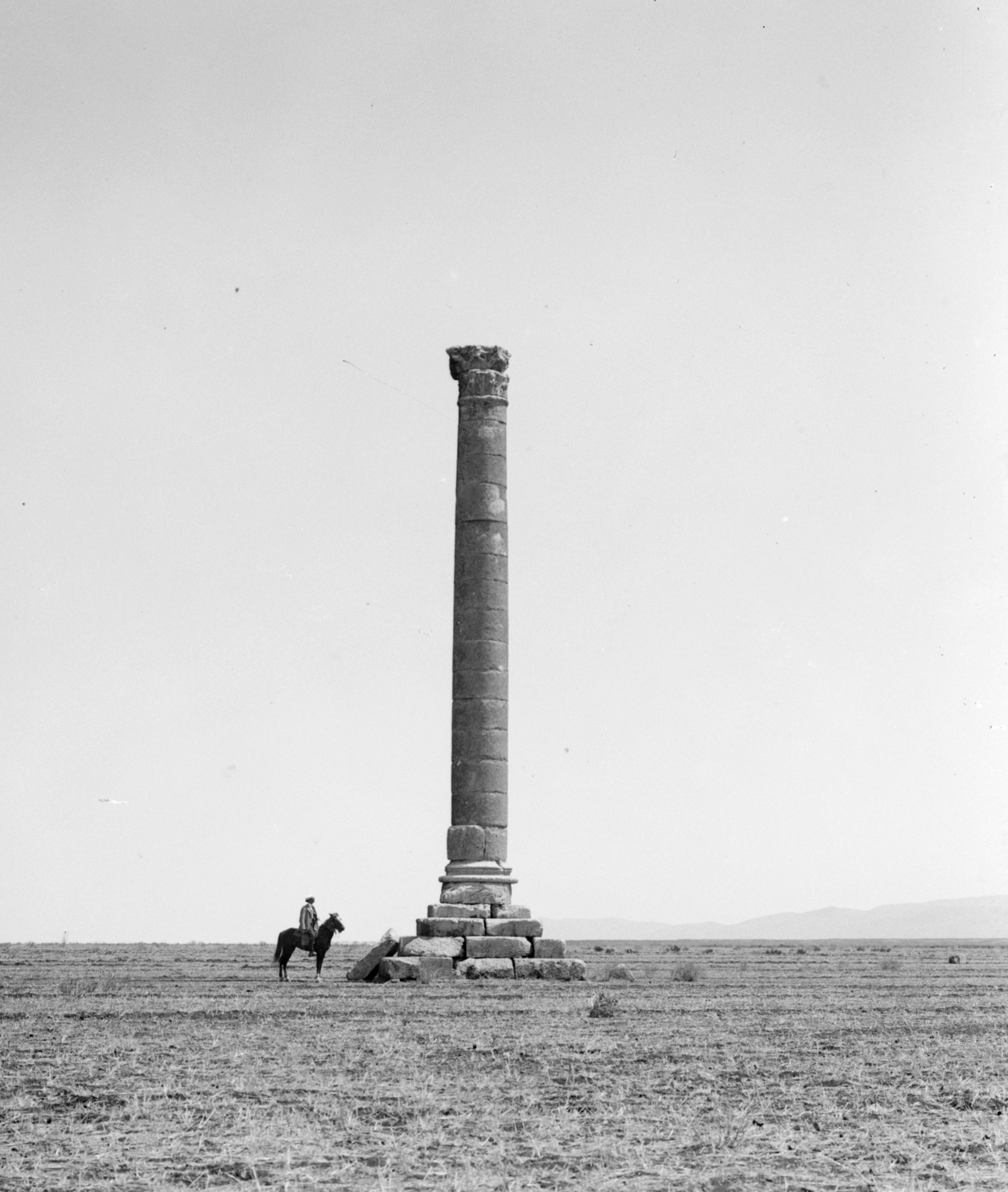
The column of Iaat in the Beqaa valley, probably a Roman shrine

In the first century the Temples started to be built, using the nearby quarries with famous ""Monoliths".

The Temple of Jupiter in Heliopolis (in a complex area called even Sanctuary of Heliopolitan Zeus) was the biggest pagan temple in the classical world. The presence of a huge quarry was one of the reasons for the Roman decision to create a huge "Great Court" of a big pagan temple complex in this mountain site, located at nearly 1100 meters of altitude and on the eastern Borders of the Roman Empire: it took three centuries to create this colossal Roman paganism's temple complex.

With Constantine the Great Christianity was declared officially the religion of the Roman empire and the pagan Temples started to be neglected. Eusebius records that the Emperor Constantine destroyed a temple of Venus 'on the summit of Mount Lebanon'. Later the Bizantines used some materials from the abandoned Temples.

== Surveys ==
Documentation of the temples in the Beqaa Valley area began in the 19th century, with surveys by Edward Robinson in 1852 CE and Sir Charles Warren. The most notable of the temples of Venus, Bacchus and Jupiter at Baalbek were thoroughly studied by Paul Collart and Pierre Coupel. Ten sacred sites were also documented by Daniel Krencker and Willy Schietzschmann in 1938. Maurice Tallon published an itinerary of the sanctuaries in 1967 with details of the paths to reach them. George F. Taylor provided a pictorial guide in the late 1960s with more recent information coming from Shim'on Dar in 1993 and epigraphic surveys in 2002 and 2003.

The Seleucids occupied the area after 200 BCE, shortly after which the Ituraeans developed a principality in the area until the fall of Chalcis when the territory passed to the Herodian kings Agrippa I and Agrippa II. After the end of the first century CE the territory became jointly controlled by the cities of Damascus, Sidon and Paneas. It is thought that the area was inhabited continuously until the third century CE. Although the sites may have been built on previous layers of architecture, the current temples are predominantly considered to be of Roman construction and were largely abandoned after the fourth century CE during the Byzantine era.

The temples were often connected with ancient occupational sites. Olivier Callot and Pierre-Louis Gatier argued that several of the temple sites might have been mistaken for monumental tombs as Roman mausoleums such as Saidnaya have been found in Lebanon. Taylor held the view that the religious architecture was the responsibility of "the hand of a single master builder" but was not able to answer the question of why so many shrines should be concentrated in the area. Henry Seyrig, when reviewing Krencker and Zscheitzmann's "Romische Tempel in Syrien" highlighted that "the clue to an important social and economic change that would deserve to be one day the focus of a study". There is still a deplorable lack of a comprehensive study into the history, archaeology, architecture of these buildings and ancient sites, or the religious life of the people who used them.

== Temple types ==
The typology of the temples has been studied and they are generally divided into Antae, Prostylos or Peripteral types. Antae temples have side walls that extend to form a porch at the front or rear (or both) and terminated in pilasters that were called the antae. If columns were placed in advance of the walls or antae, the temple was termed Prostylos and if columns surrounded the temple it was termed Peripteral. The peripteral type is thought to be the most perfect form of temple and the best preserved of this type is the Temple of Bacchus at Baalbek.

== Worship ==
It was the opinion of Edward Robinson that worship was not conducted within the temples, but rather outside it. The temple was the domain of the priests where they venerated a cult statue. Worshippers gathered around the temple at ceremonial times and hence there was no need for divisions within it, such as the aisles of modern churches. The cult images, along with temples themselves would often be aligned so that the sun would illuminate them at certain times of day and year. George F. Taylor was of the opinion that a sacrifice would be made when certain areas of the temple became illuminated. He suggested that a "Minister of Works" may have been responsible for local civil engineering in Ancient Roman times.

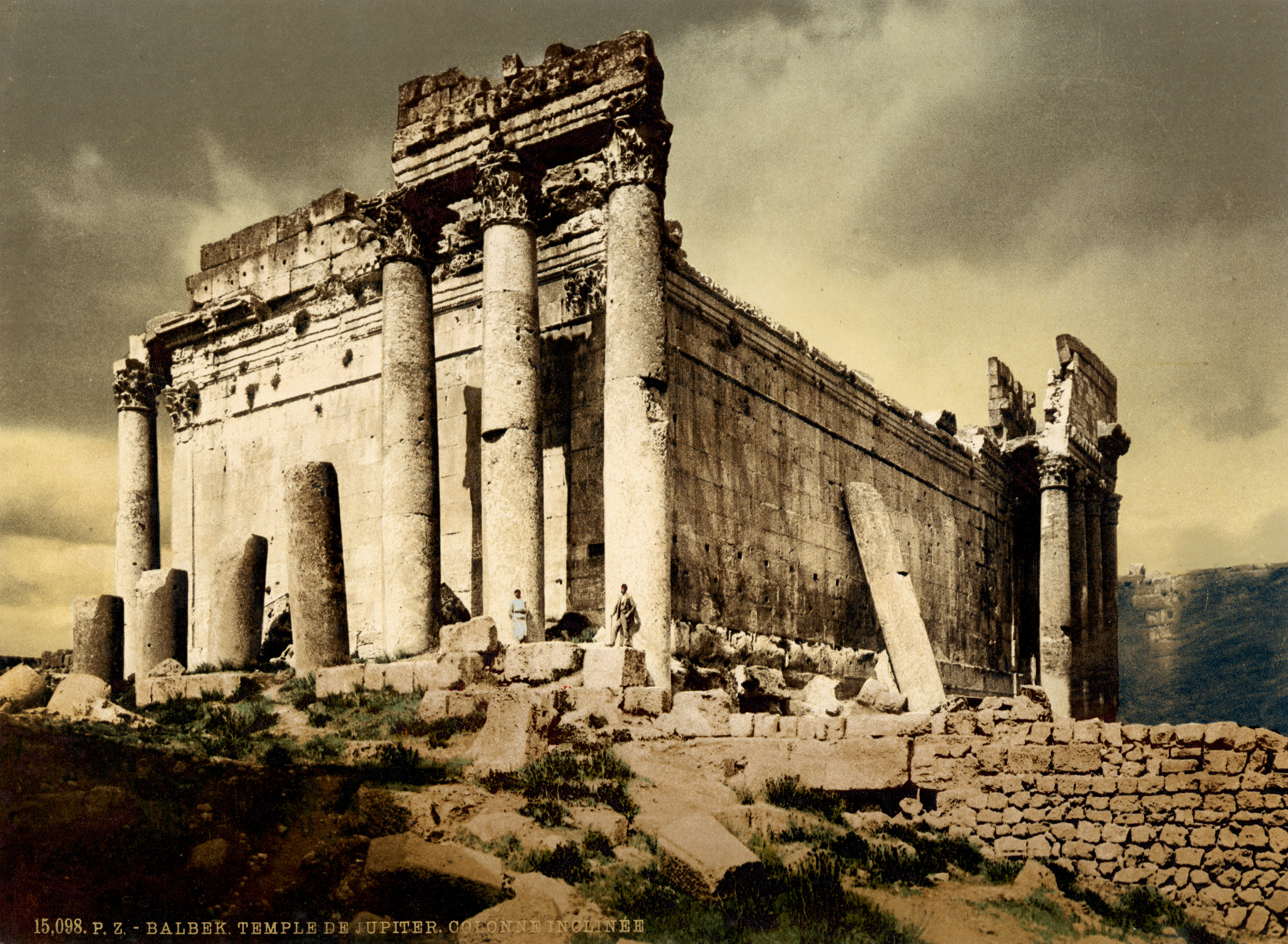
Heliopolis temple in 1895

== Temple groups ==
George F. Taylor divided up the Temples of Lebanon into three groups:

- First, one covering the Beqaa valley north of the road from Beirut to Damascus.
- Second, a group to the south, including the Wadi al-Taym known as Temples of Mount Hermon.
- Third, a group in the area west of a line drawn along the ridge of Mount Lebanon that includes Makam Er-Rab, Sfira, Kasr Naous, Amioun, Bziza, Batroun, Edde, Mashnaqa, Yanouh, Afka, Qalaat Faqra, Kalaa, Sarba Jounieh, Antoura, Deir el-Kalaa, Shheem and the coastal plains of Beirut, Byblos, Sidon, Tripoli and Tyre.

The Temples of the Beqaa Valley in Taylor's first group included El-Lebwe, Yammoune, Qasr Banat, Iaat, Nahle, Baalbek, Hadeth, Kasarnaba, Temnin el-Foka, Nebi Ham, Saraain El Faouqa, Niha, Hosn Niha, Ferzol and Kafr Zebad.

== Niha Gallery ==
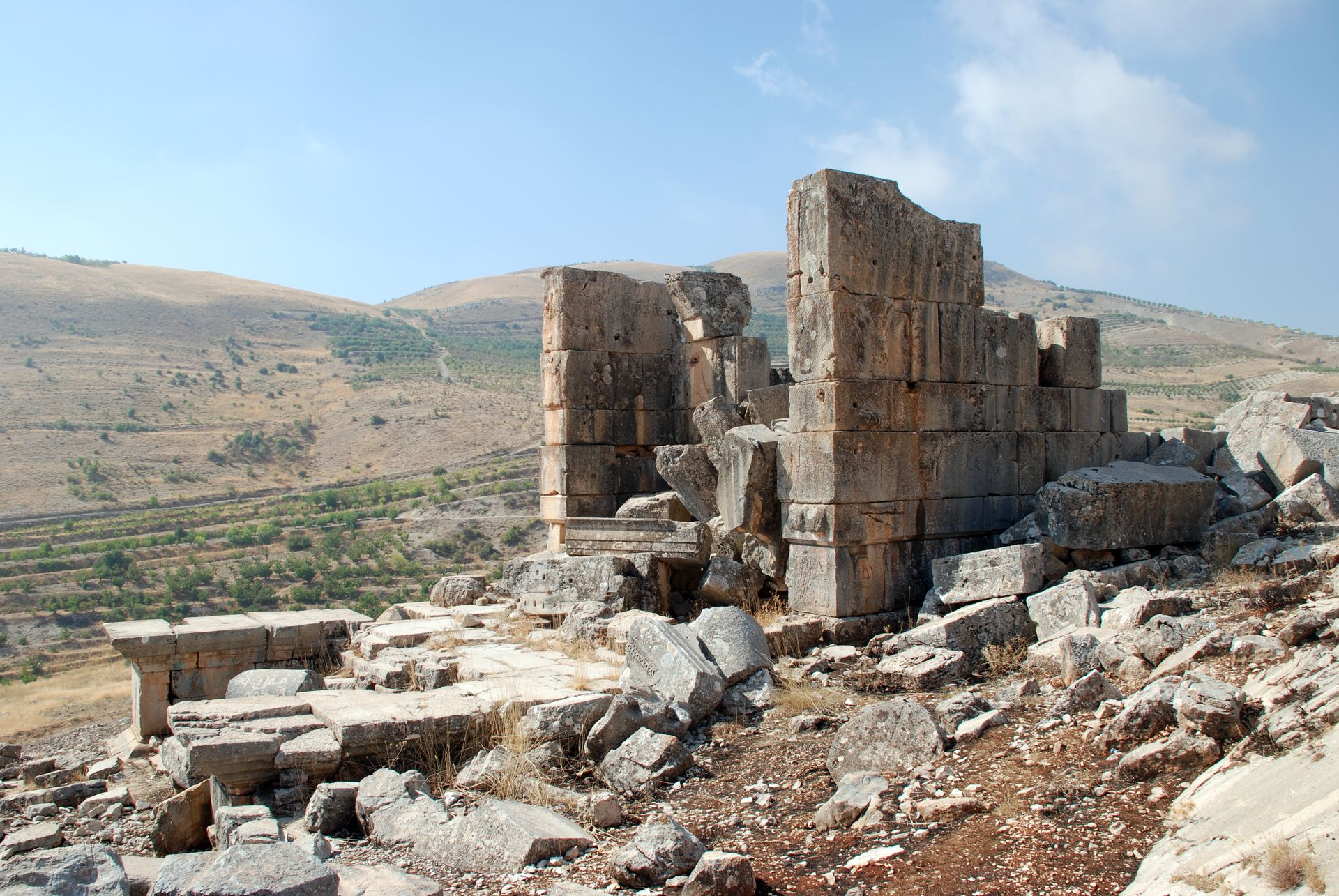
Roman temple of Hosn Niha, Lebanon

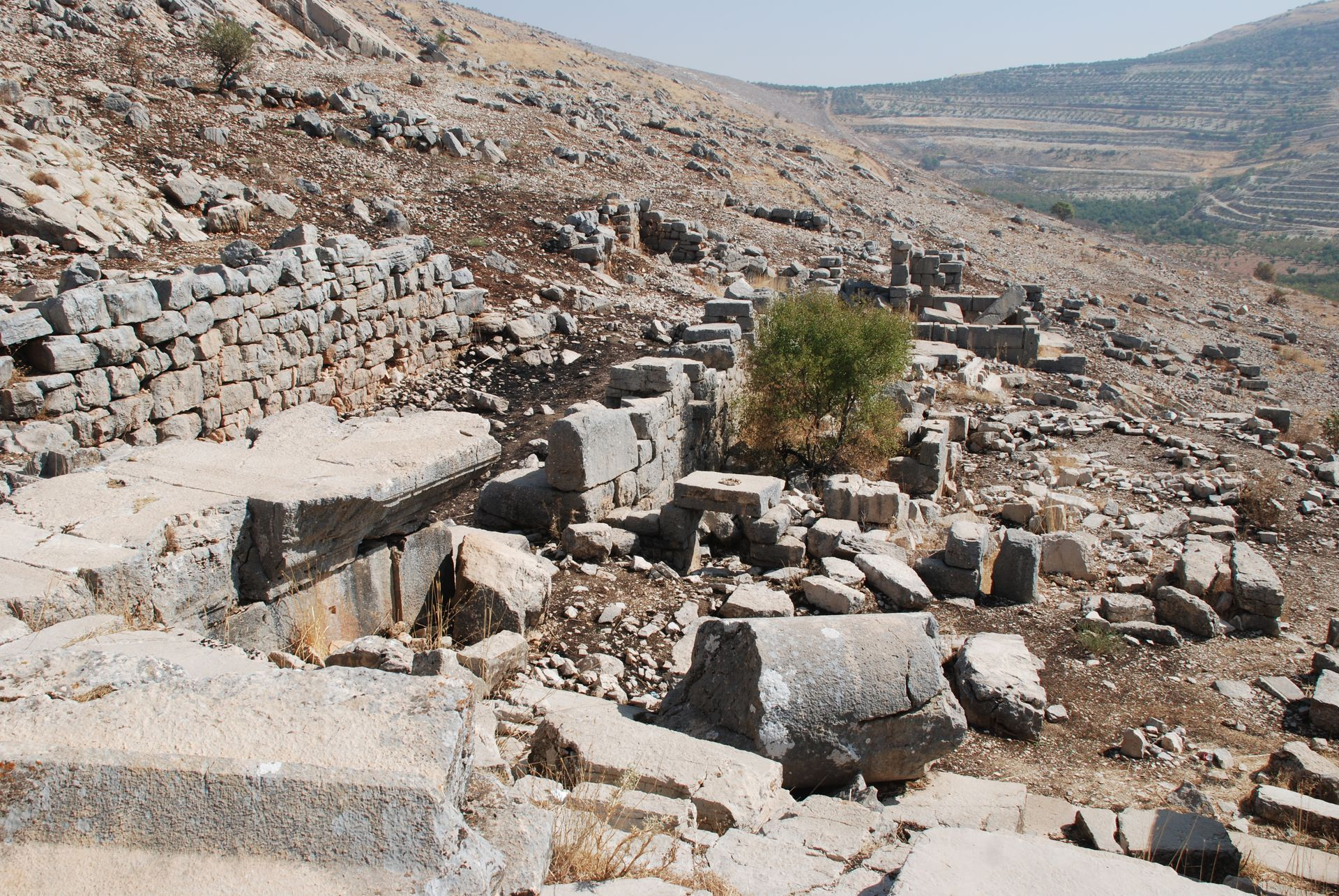
Roman temple of Hosn Niha, Lebanon

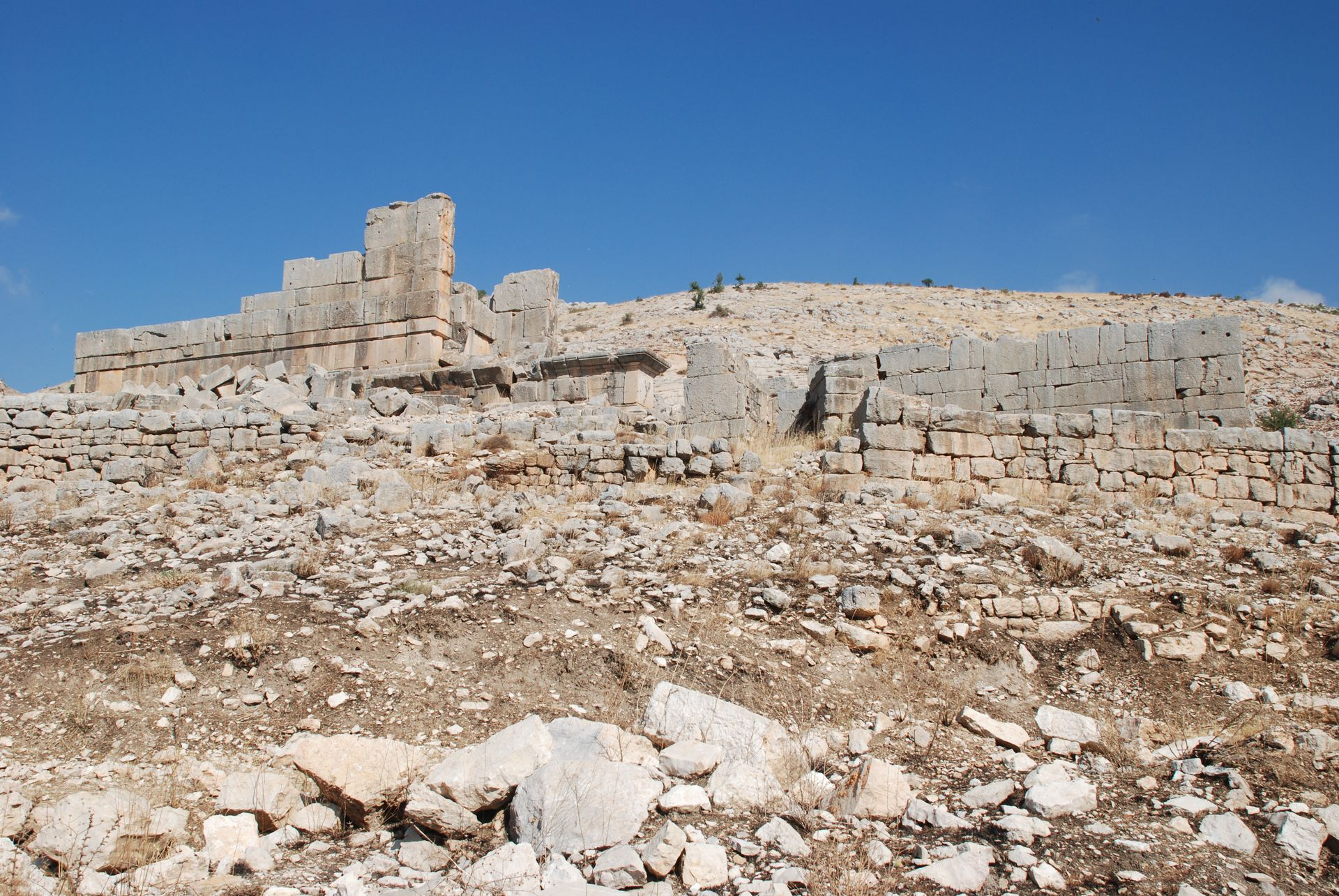
Roman temple of Hosn Niha, Lebanon

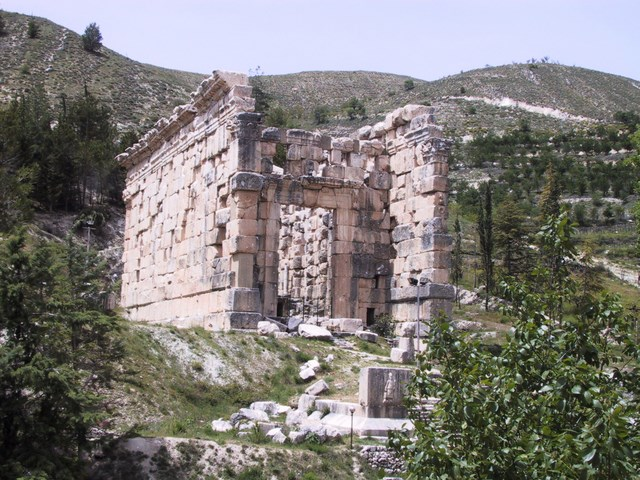
Roman temple at Niha, Lebanon

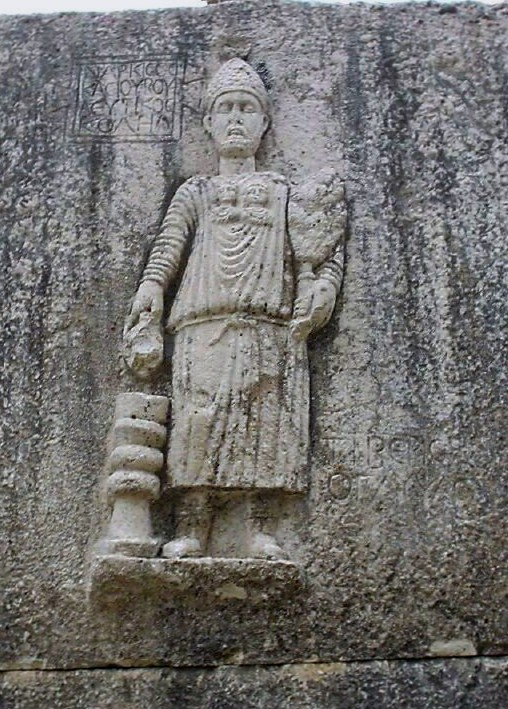
Statue at the Roman temple at Niha, Lebanon

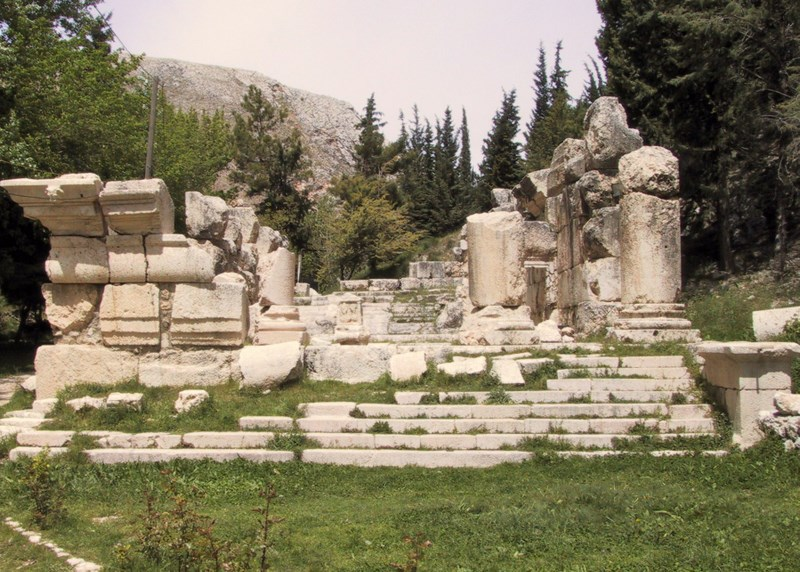
Small lower temple at Niha, Lebanon

== Heliopolis (Baalbek) Gallery ==
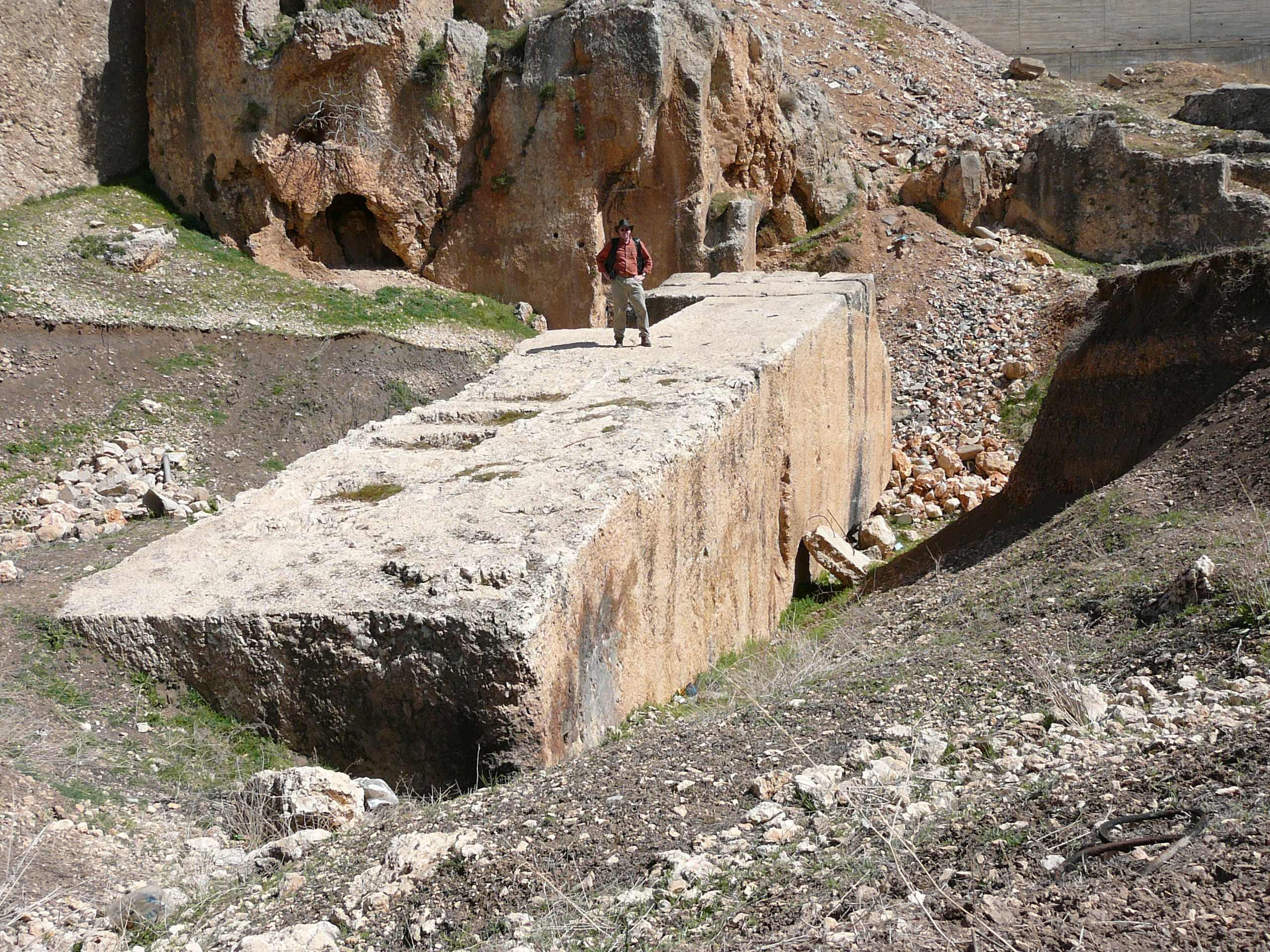
The largest stone at Baalbek

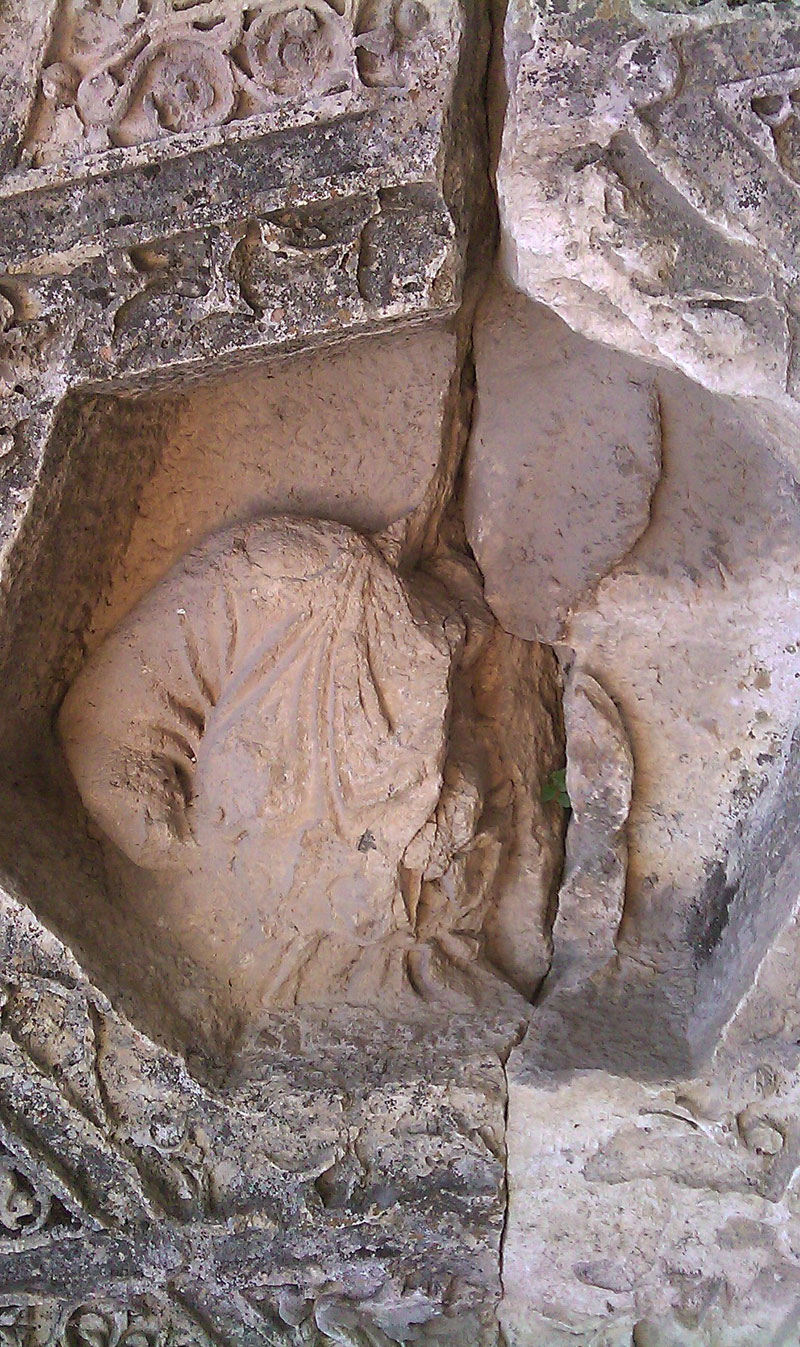
Sculpture of an unknown God at Baalbek

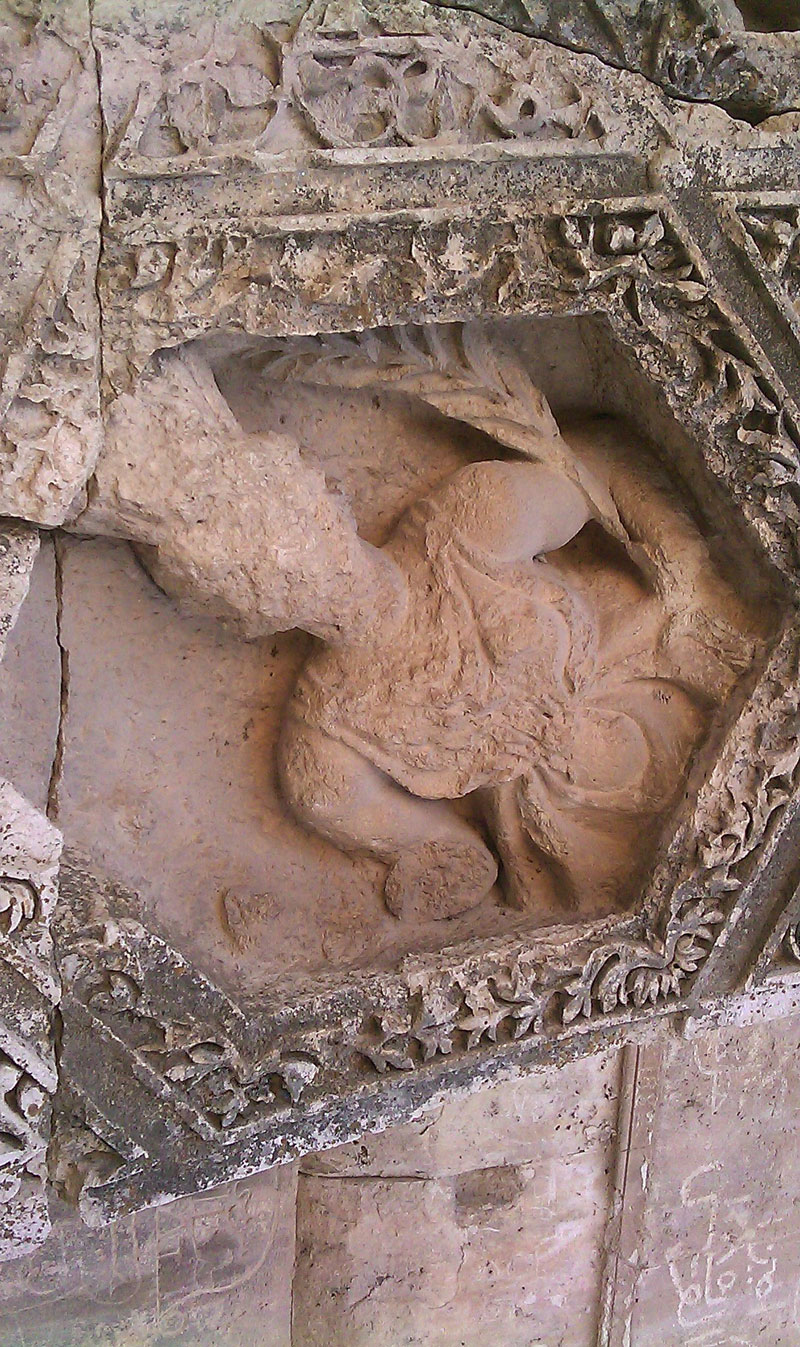
Roof sculpture of Ceres at Baalbek

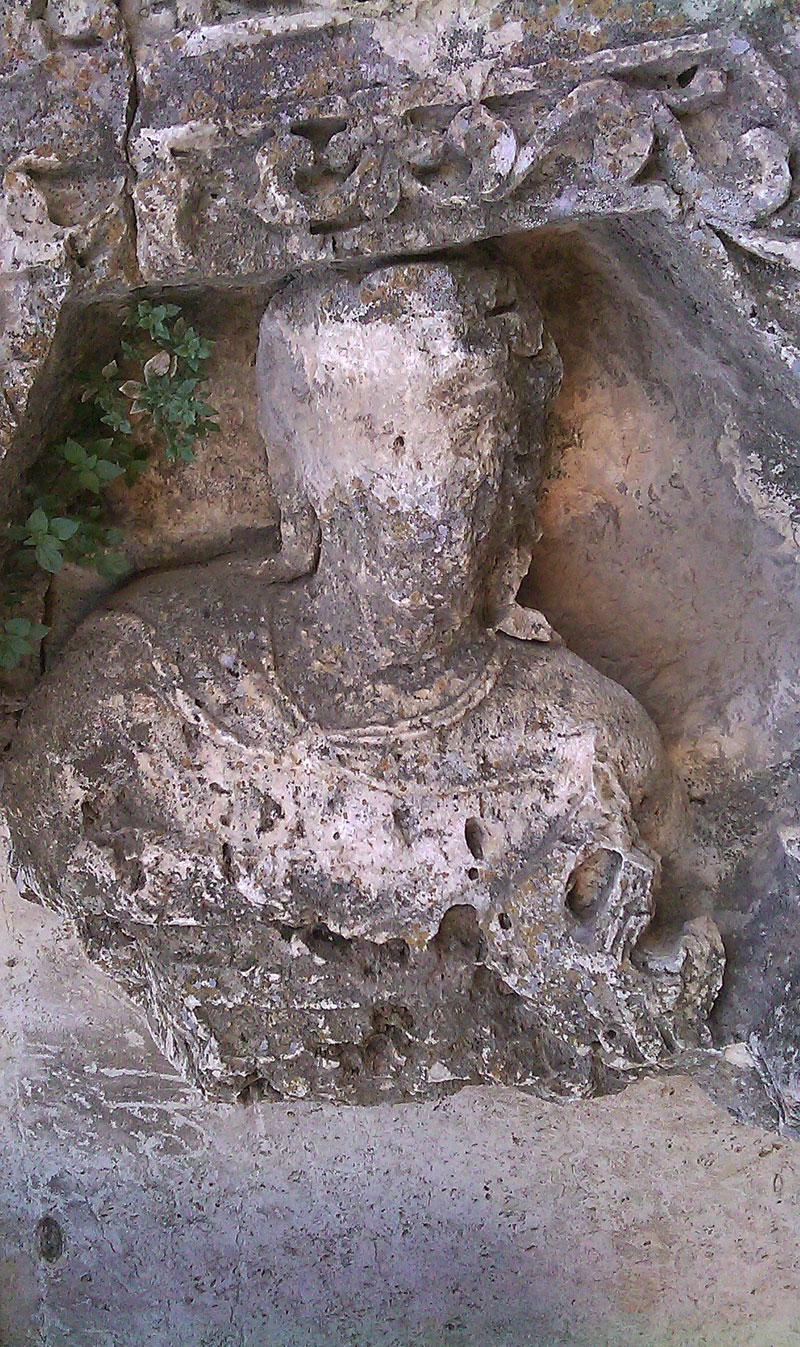
Sculpture of Mark Antony at Baalbek

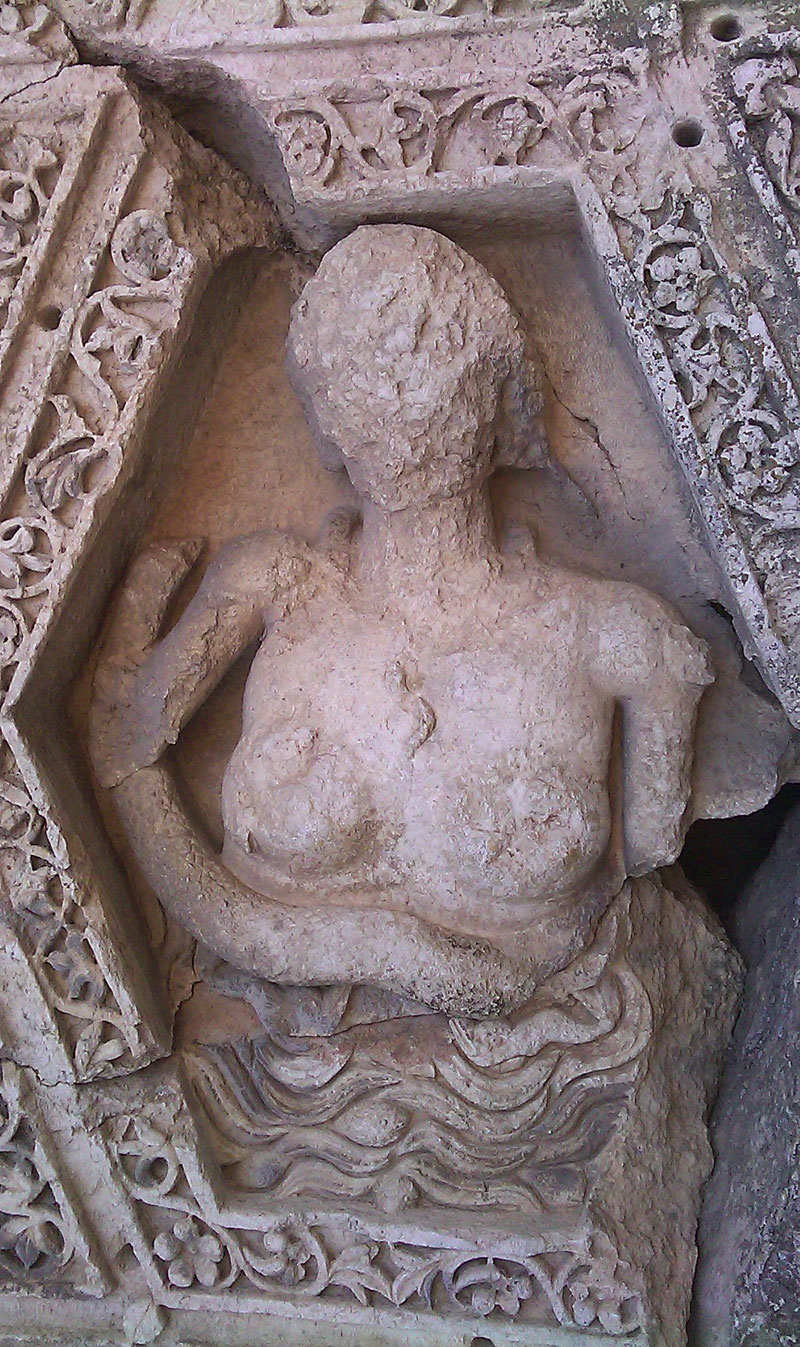
Sculpture of Cleopatra at Baalbek

== See also ==
- List of Ancient Roman temples
- Temple of Bacchus
- Baalbek § Ruins
- Temples of Mount Hermon
