= Qarsita =

Village in Miniyeh-Danniyeh District, Lebanon

Qarsita قرصيتا
- village
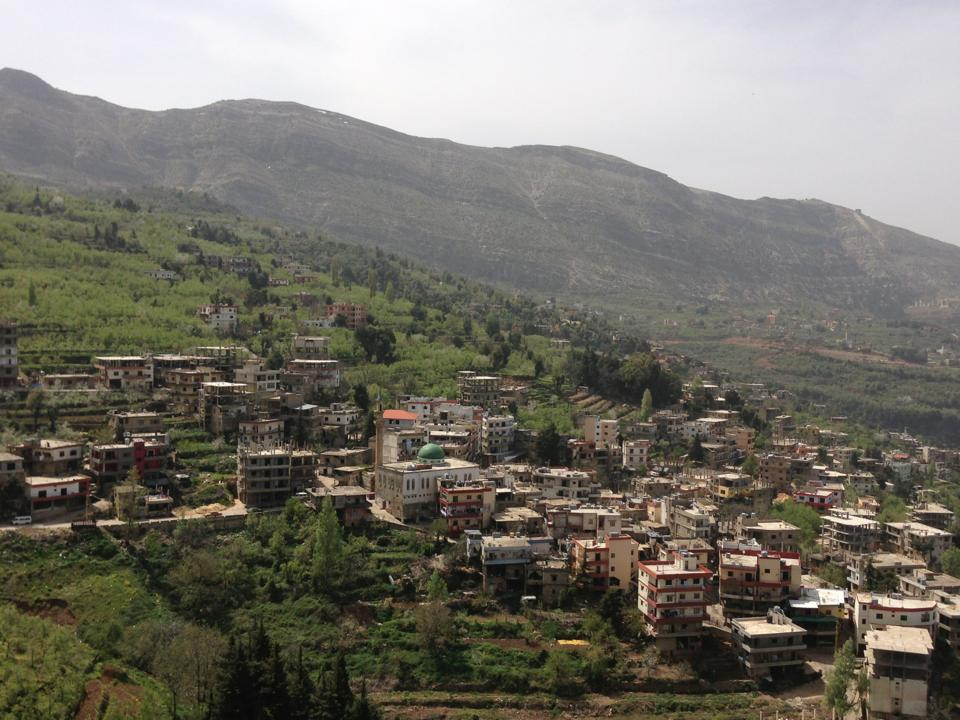
- Qarsita

- Location within Lebanon
- Coordinates: 34°23′N 36°04′E
- Country: Lebanon
- Governorate: North Governorate
- Districts of Lebanon: Miniyeh-Danniyeh District
- Time zone: UTC+2 (Asia/Beirut)
  - Summer (DST): +3

Qarsita (Arabic: قرصيتا, romanized: Qarṣītā) is a village located in the highest mountains of Miniyeh-Danniyeh District, in the North Governorate of Lebanon. The village is famous for cultivation of pears, apples, peaches and variety of fruits and is one of the first producers of pears and apples in Lebanon. The very cold village, in comparison with surrounded areas, is characterized by its nature scenery and its unique position overlooking the city of Tripoli, the towns of the Akkar District and the Syrian coast. Qarsita is one of the rich village in fresh water in Miniyeh-Danniyeh District, it contains thousandth of fresh water sources, the biggest one called Source of Sugar feeds a large number of villages in the area.

The village is located in the extreme north of Lebanon, bordered on the north by Sfira, by Beit El Faqs on the west, by Nemrine on the south and bordered on the east by Western Lebanese mountains chain. Qarsita is one of the biggest villages in area in Miniyeh-Danniyeh District, however Qarn Jayroun area, which is 15 km far from Qarsita, belongs administratively to the municipality of Qarsita because its agricultural areas belong too to some Qarsitian families.

In 2012, Qarsita had an unofficial population of 5500, most of them are young. Since the 19th century, a large number of families migrated to the city of Tripoli either for work or to provide better educational opportunities.

== Etymology ==
The name of this village is derived from the two Arabic words: "Qar" and "Sita", which mean "cold" and "famous" respectively.

== Economy and culture ==
As already mentioned, Qarsita is one of the first producers of pears and apples in Lebanese villages. According to the Municipality of Qarsita, about 80% of the population live on agricultural benefits accompanied by conventional breeding of animals. Since 2000, beekeeping started to be an alternative product to agriculture due to weak exportation and the bad management from the successive governments. In Qarsita, some of industrial craft still steadfast. Recently, Qarsitian people started to go toward trading and the establishment of small businesses as alternative to agriculture and young educated people started to emigrate toward Arab States of the Persian Gulf, Europe and other
