= Kafr Zabad =

Kfar Zabad كفر زبد כפר זבד
- Village
- Kafr Zabad
- Location in Lebanon
- Coordinates: 33°45′30″N 35°58′02″E
- Country: Lebanon
- Governorate: Beqaa Governorate
- District: Zahlé
- Elevation: 3,235 ft (986 m)
- Time zone: UTC+2 (EET)
  - Summer (DST): +3

Kafr Zabad
- كفر زبد (Arabic)
- Interactive map of Kafr Zabad
- Cultures: Roman

Site notes
- Condition: Ruins
- Public access: Yes

Kafr Zabad (Arabic: كفر زبد), is a village in Lebanon. It is also the site of two ancient Roman antae temples.

== History ==
The village probably was founded during early Roman centuries. It is located at nearly 986 meters of altitude. It is famous because of its Roman temples.

George F. Taylor classed the temples in a group of Temples of the Beqaa Valley. They are situated 1,000 feet (300 m) above the village on a hill. The temples had almost been completely destroyed when Taylor visited the site. He noted only foundations and some parts of the cella walls and pediment of the upper temple had survived. Remains of architraves, carved stones and door frames littered the hill.

The lower temple had only one section of upright door frame, again with blocks of pediment, architrave and cornice lying scattered about the landscape of the Anti-Lebanon. There is a relief carved into a rock approximately 100 metres (330 ft) east of the temple with the figure of a Roman goddess (probably Venus). The figure is barely recognisable and had been mostly destroyed with only the lower half remaining distinguishable: indeed to the northeast of the lower temple there it is a rock-cut relief of Venus, called "Bint El Malik" or the king's daughter by the local people.

There it is also a Roman sanctuary probably dedicated to the god Mercury; the area also has ancient quarries and shaft tombs from the Roman period.

In 1838, Eli Smith noted Kefr Zebad as a Druze and Christian village in the Baalbek area.

== Geography ==
The town is situated 58 km (36 mi) to the east of the Lebanese capital Beirut. The Litani River flows just around the outskirts of the town.

== See also ==
- Temples of the Beqaa Valley
- Temnin el-Foka

== Bibliography ==
- Robinson, E.; Smith, E. (1841). Biblical Researches in Palestine, Mount Sinai and Arabia Petraea: A Journal of Travels in the year 1838. Vol. 3. Boston: Crocker & Brewster.
