= George Hajj =

George Zaki El Hajj
- جورج الحاج
- Born: 1953 (age 72–73); Iaat, Bekaa Valley, Lebanon
- Education: PhD, State Doctorate
- Alma mater: Lebanese University, Saint Joseph University, University of Strasbourg
- Occupations: Writer, poet, researcher, academic
- Works: Over 30 books, including critical studies, literature, and poetry collections

George Zaki El Hajj (Arabic: جورج الحاج; born 1953) is a Lebanese writer, poet, researcher, and academic. Born in the town of Iaat, Bekaa Valley, he is a professor at the Lebanese University and a member of the Lebanese Writers' Union.

== Life ==
George Zaki El Hajj was born in 1953 in the town of Iaat in the Bekaa Valley. He completed his elementary education in his village, then moved to Baalbek to finish his middle and first secondary education. He studied at the Faculty of Law, Political and Administrative Sciences at the Lebanese University, before moving to the Faculty of Arts and Human Sciences at the same university, where he obtained a master's degree in Arabic Language and Literature. He then moved to Saint Joseph University to obtain a Ph.D. in Arabic literature. After that, he traveled to Strasbourg, France, where he also obtained a State Doctorate in literary criticism.

El Hajj worked as a lecturer at the Faculty of Arts and Human Sciences at the Lebanese University until his retirement.

== Works ==
Al-Hajj has conducted numerous research studies and authored over 30 books, spanning critical studies, literature, and poetry. His works cover a variety of genres, including short stories (two collections), political criticism (two books), religious intellectual criticism (one book), and poetry (eight collections: four in Standard Arabic and four in colloquial Arabic). His other works focus on critical thought and literary theory, engaging with the Lebanese literary movement from the early 20th century to the present day.
