= Iaat =

Iaat إيعات
- Town
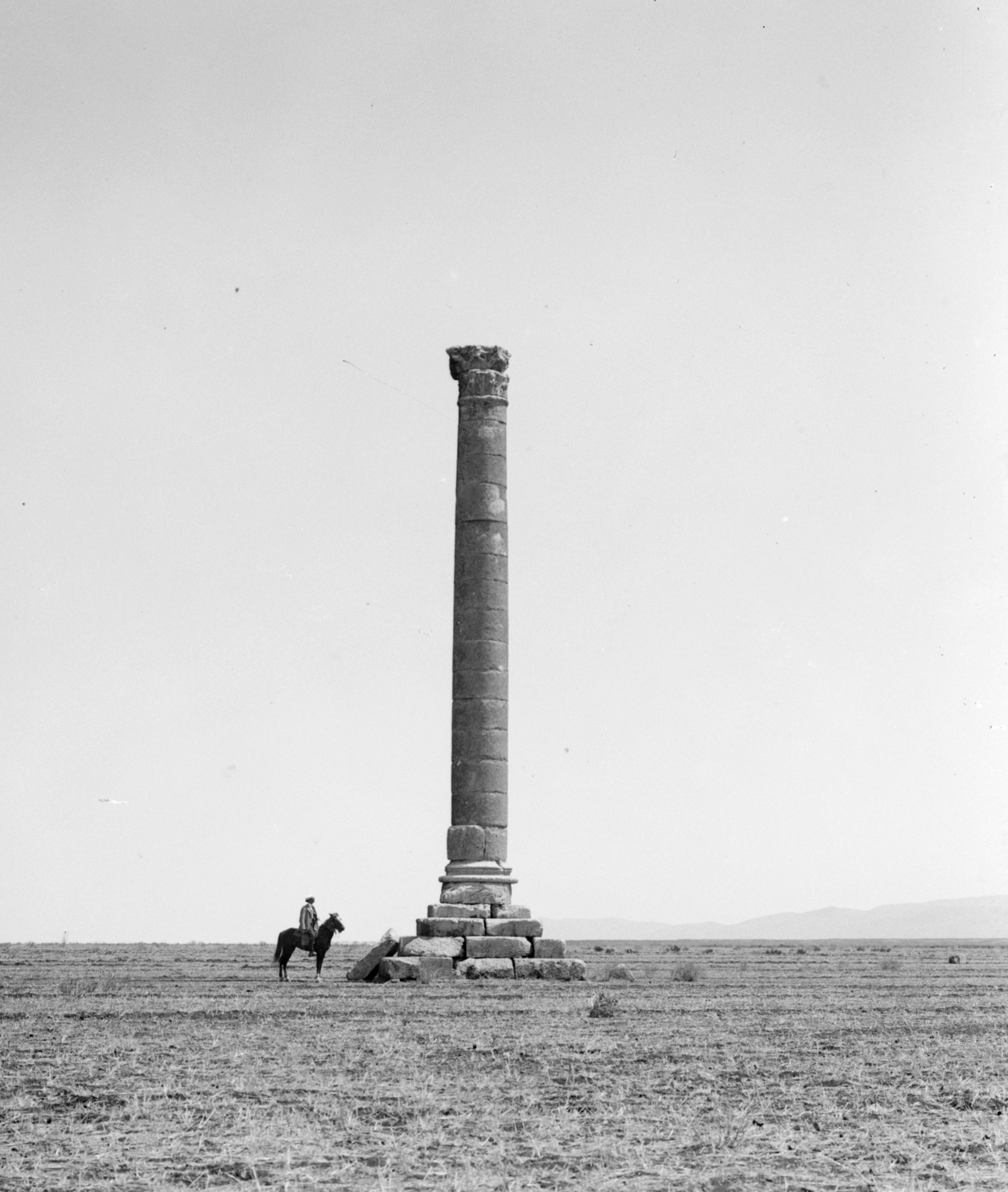
- A photograph of the column from the first quarter of the 20th century

- Location in Lebanon
- Coordinates: 34.038023°N 36.174451°E
- Country: Lebanon
- Governorate: Baalbek-Hermel
- District: Baalbek

Iaat (Arabic: إيعات also transliterated as Ya'ad, Yaad, Yaat, or Iaad) is a town and municipality located approximately 5 kilometers northwest of Baalbek, in the Beqaa Valley of Lebanon. The town is famed for its Corinthian column, the Iaat column. This is a single column of unknown date (but probably dated from Roman times), approximately halfway between Baalbek and Qasr el Banat, with a cartouche on the 6th drum but no inscription.

== History ==
Ottoman tax registers between 1533 and 1548 indicate the village had 180 households and 4 bachelors, all Muslims.

In 1838, Eli Smith noted Ei'at as a Metawileh village in the Baalbek District. The town also has a Christian minority.

== Iaat column ==
The column stands 18 meters (59.1 feet) and is installed on a four-step base. The location of the Pillar is 4 miles (6 km) northwest of the Baalbek ruins, between the towns of Baalbek and Chlifa. At one point, a plaque was installed on the northern side of the monument. However, it has been removed and no other history is known of the column. The column is believed in local legend to be related to Helena, mother of Constantine I.

The British scholar George F. Taylor classified it among a group of temples of the Beqaa Valley and noticed that the position of the Iaat column was equidistant between the temples of Baalbek and Qasr el Banat. Whilst technically not being a temple, Taylor suggested that the column might have been placed by the Romans where it is as a victory column to mark the site of a great ancient battle. He also noted a cartouche on the sixth cylinder of the column.

== See also ==
- Heliopolis in Phoenicia
- Qasr el Banat
- Roman Phoenicia

== Bibliography ==
- Robinson, E.; Smith, E. (1841). Biblical Researches in Palestine, Mount Sinai and Arabia Petraea: A Journal of Travels in the year 1838. Vol. 3. Boston: Crocker & Brewster.
