= Battle of Anjar =

1623 battle

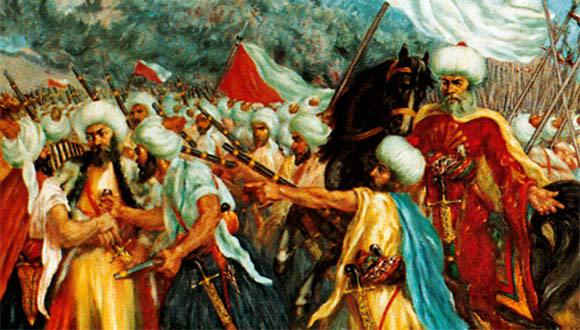
- Fakhreddine by César Gemayel depicting the Emir rallying his troops to battle
Date	1 November 1623
Location	Anjar, Ottoman Empire (present-day Lebanon) 33°43′33″N 35°55′47″E
Result	Lebanese strategic victory: Fakhr al-Din II captures Mustafa Pasha; Beylerbey confirms the Ma'nid governorships; Ma'nid authority strengthened in Mount Lebanon
Territorial changes	Mount Lebanon remained semi-autonomous; Territory of Mount Lebanon Emirate expands to its greatest extent; Occupied cites subjected to taxes; Ma'nid influence expands into the Beqaa Valley, Safed, Ajloun and Nablus

Belligerents
Mount Lebanon Emirate; Ma'n dynasty; Supported by: Grand Duchy of Tuscany	Ottoman Empire; Ottoman Syria; Harfush dynasty

Commanders and leaders
Fakhr al-Din II	Mustafa Pasha al-Hannaq (surrendered); Yunus al‑Harfush

Strength
5,000 Lebanese troops	12,000 Ottoman and allied troops

Casualties and losses
Light	Heavy

The Battle of Anjar was fought on 1 November 1623 between the army of Fakhr al-Din II and a coalition army led by the governor of Damascus Mustafa Pasha.

== Background ==
In 1623, Yunus al-Harfush prohibited the Druze of the Chouf from cultivating their lands in the southern Beqaa, angering Fakhr al-Din. In August/September 1623 he stationed sekbans in the southern Beqaa village of Qabb Ilyas and evicted the Harfushes. Meanwhile, in June or July, the imperial authorities had replaced Fakhr al-Din's son Ali as sanjak-bey of Safed and replaced his other son Husayn and Mustafa Kethuda as the sanjak-beys of Ajlun and Nablus respectively with local opponents of Fakhr al-Din. The imperial authorities soon after restored the Ma'ns to Ajlun and Nablus, but not to Safed. The Ma'ns thereupon moved to assume control of Ajlun and Nablus, prompting Yunus al-Harfush to call on the janissary leader Kurd Hamza, who wielded significant influence over the beylerbey of Damascus, Mustafa Pasha, to block their advance. Kurd Hamza then secured Yunus al-Harfush's appointment to Safed, followed by a failed attempt by Fakhr al-Din to outbid him for the governorship.

Fakhr al-Din launched a campaign against the Turabays and Farrukhs in northern Palestine, but was defeated in a battle at the Awja River near Ramla. On his way back to Mount Lebanon from the abortive Palestine campaign, Fakhr al-Din was notified that the imperial government had reappointed his sons and allies to Safed, Ajlun, and Nablus. The reversal was linked to the successions of Sultan Murad IV (r. 1623–1640) and Grand Vizier Kemankeş Ali Pasha, the latter of whom had been bribed by Fakhr al-Din's agent in Constantinople to restore the Ma'ns to their former sanjaks. Mustafa Pasha and Kurd Hamza, nonetheless, proceeded to launch an expedition against the Ma'ns. Fakhr al-Din arrived in Qabb Ilyas on 22 October, and immediately moved to restore lost money and provisions from the Palestine campaign by raiding the nearby villages of Karak Nuh and Sar'in, both held by the Harfushes.

== Forces ==
The forces of Fakhr al-Din II were primarily composed of Druze fighters drawn from the districts of Mount Lebanon under the control of the Ma'n dynasty. These troops were supported by local allies, including Shia levies from parts of the Beqaa Valley and irregular infantry known as sekbans, who were commonly employed as mercenaries throughout the Ottoman provinces during the seventeenth century. Fakhr al-Din also relied on the support of allied families such as the Shihabs, who commanded contingents of fighters and helped secure positions in the region surrounding Anjar.

The opposing force was assembled by the Ottoman provincial authorities in Damascus and was commanded by the governor of the province, Mustafa Pasha al-Hannaq. His army included janissaries stationed in Damascus as well as provincial troops and allied forces from local dynasties that opposed Fakhr al-Din’s growing power. Among these were the Harfush family of the Beqaa Valley and elements associated with the Sayfa family of northern Lebanon. The Ottoman army represented the authority of the imperial administration in the region and was intended to suppress Fakhr al-Din’s expansion and reassert direct control over the contested districts.

== Commanders ==
The army of Mount Lebanon was led by Fakhr al-Din II, the most prominent ruler of the Ma'n dynasty and one of the most influential regional leaders in Ottoman Syria during the early seventeenth century. Fakhr al-Din had gradually expanded his authority over Mount Lebanon and surrounding territories through alliances, military campaigns, and negotiations with Ottoman officials. His leadership during the campaign culminated in the confrontation at Anjar, where he personally directed the mobilization of Druze fighters and coordinated the actions of his allies.

Opposing him was Mustafa Pasha al-Hannaq, the Ottoman governor of Damascus, who had been tasked with curbing Fakhr al-Din’s growing autonomy. Mustafa Pasha relied on support from regional leaders hostile to the Ma'n dynasty, including Yunus al-Harfush and other provincial allies. The campaign represented an attempt by the Ottoman provincial administration to prevent Fakhr al-Din from consolidating power across the Levant and to restore stronger imperial oversight in the region.

== Battle ==
Afterward, the Damascenes, the Harfushes, and the Sayfas set out from Damascus, while Fakhr al-Din mobilized his Druze fighters, sekbans, and Shia levies. He sent the Shihabs to serve as his vanguard in the tower of Anjar, but by the time Fakhr al-Din arrived there in early November 1623, the Shihabs had been driven off and the Sayfas and Harfushes had taken over the tower. Fakhr al-Din immediately routed the Damascene janissaries at Anjar and captured Mustafa Pasha, while Kurd Hamza and Yunus al-Harfush escaped to Aleppo. Fakhr al-Din extracted from the beylerbey confirmation of the Ma'ns' governorships, his appointment over Gaza Sanjak, his son Mansur over Lajjun Sanjak, and Ali over the southern Beqaa nahiya. The appointments to Gaza, Nablus and Lajjun were not implemented due to the opposition of local powerholders.

== Strategy and tactics ==
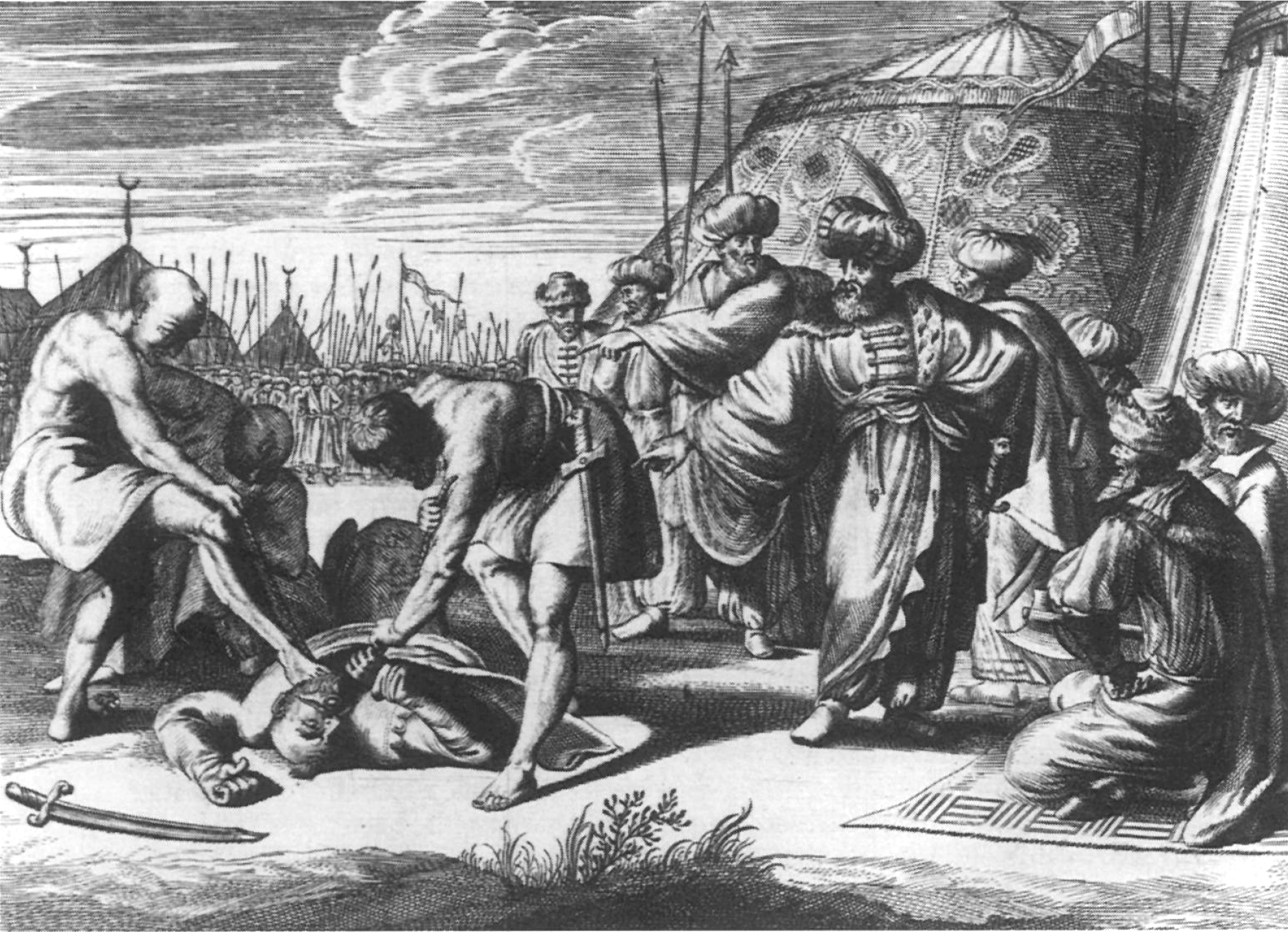
1677 engraving by Olfert Dapper depicting Fakhr al-Din's capture of Mustafa Pasha.

Fakhr al-Din’s strategy relied heavily on the mobility and local knowledge of his Druze fighters. By quickly mobilizing his forces and concentrating them around Anjar, he was able to confront the Ottoman provincial army before it could fully consolidate its position in the Beqaa Valley. The use of irregular fighters familiar with the terrain allowed his army to maneuver effectively and strike the opposing forces at a moment of vulnerability.

During the battle, Fakhr al-Din’s troops succeeded in routing the Damascene janissaries and provincial soldiers. The engagement resulted in the capture of Mustafa Pasha, a development that dramatically altered the political balance of the confrontation. With the Ottoman governor in his custody, Fakhr al-Din gained a powerful bargaining position that allowed him to negotiate favorable political concessions in the aftermath of the battle.

== Aftermath ==
Afterward, Fakhr al-Din secured from Mustafa Pasha the governorship of the Zabadani nahiya for his Shihab proxy Qasim ibn Ali, while the Bekaa-i Azizi was temporarily reconfirmed to Yunus Harfush's son Ali. By March, Fakhr al-Din turned against Mustafa Pasha in favor of his replacement, but Mustafa Pasha was reinstated in April. Relations between Fakhr al-Din and Mustafa Pasha subsequently soured.

== Significance ==
The Battle of Anjar marked an important turning point in the political career of Fakhr al-Din II and in the balance of power within Ottoman Syria. By defeating the army sent against him and capturing the governor of Damascus, Fakhr al-Din demonstrated the strength of his regional alliances and the effectiveness of his military organization. The victory temporarily strengthened the position of the Ma'n dynasty and increased Fakhr al-Din’s influence over several districts in the Levant.

In the aftermath of the battle, Fakhr al-Din was able to secure confirmations of governorships and administrative authority over a number of territories from the captured governor. Although some of these arrangements were not fully implemented due to resistance from local powerholders, the confrontation nonetheless illustrated the limits of Ottoman provincial authority in the region and the ability of local leaders to challenge it under certain circumstances.

== Legacy ==
The Battle of Anjar has often been regarded as one of the most notable military successes associated with the rule of Fakhr al-Din II. In historical narratives about Mount Lebanon, the victory is frequently interpreted as an example of the growing power and influence of the Ma'n dynasty during the seventeenth century.

Modern historians generally view the battle within the broader context of Ottoman provincial politics, where local dynasties and governors competed for authority and influence. While Fakhr al-Din’s victory at Anjar did not permanently alter the structure of Ottoman rule in the region, it demonstrated the extent to which regional leaders could exercise autonomy and challenge imperial representatives during periods of political instability.

== See also ==
- Ma'n dynasty
- Druze power struggle (1658–67)
- List of extrajudicial killings and political violence in Lebanon
- List of conflicts in the Near East
