= Omar Zeineddine =

Lebanese footballer

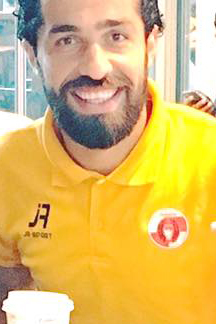
- Zeineddine with Perseru Serui in 2017

Personal information
- Full name: Omar Saifeddine Zeineddine
- Date of birth: 13 June 1987 (age 39)
- Place of birth: Beit El Faqs, Lebanon
- Height: 1.75 m (5 ft 9 in)
- Position: Midfielder

Youth career
- 2001–2007: Riyada Wal Adab

Senior career*
Years	Team	Apps	(Gls)
2007–2014	Riyada Wal Adab		
2014–2017	Salam Zgharta	49	(5)
2017	Perseru Serui	3	(0)
2017–2018	Salam Zgharta	18	(8)
2018–2020	Nejmeh	7	(1)
- * Club domestic league appearances and goals

Omar Saifeddine Zeineddine (Arabic: عُمَر سَيْف الدِّين زَيْن الدِّين; born 13 June 1987) is a Lebanese former professional footballer who played as a midfielder.

== Career ==
In 2017, Zeineddine moved to Indonesian club Perseru Serui.
