= Qasr el Banat, Lebanon =

Roman temple in Kasarnaba, Lebanon

Qasr el Banat
- Castra El Banaat
- Qasr el Banât, Qasr al Banat, Kasr el-Banat, Qasr/Castra El-Banaat
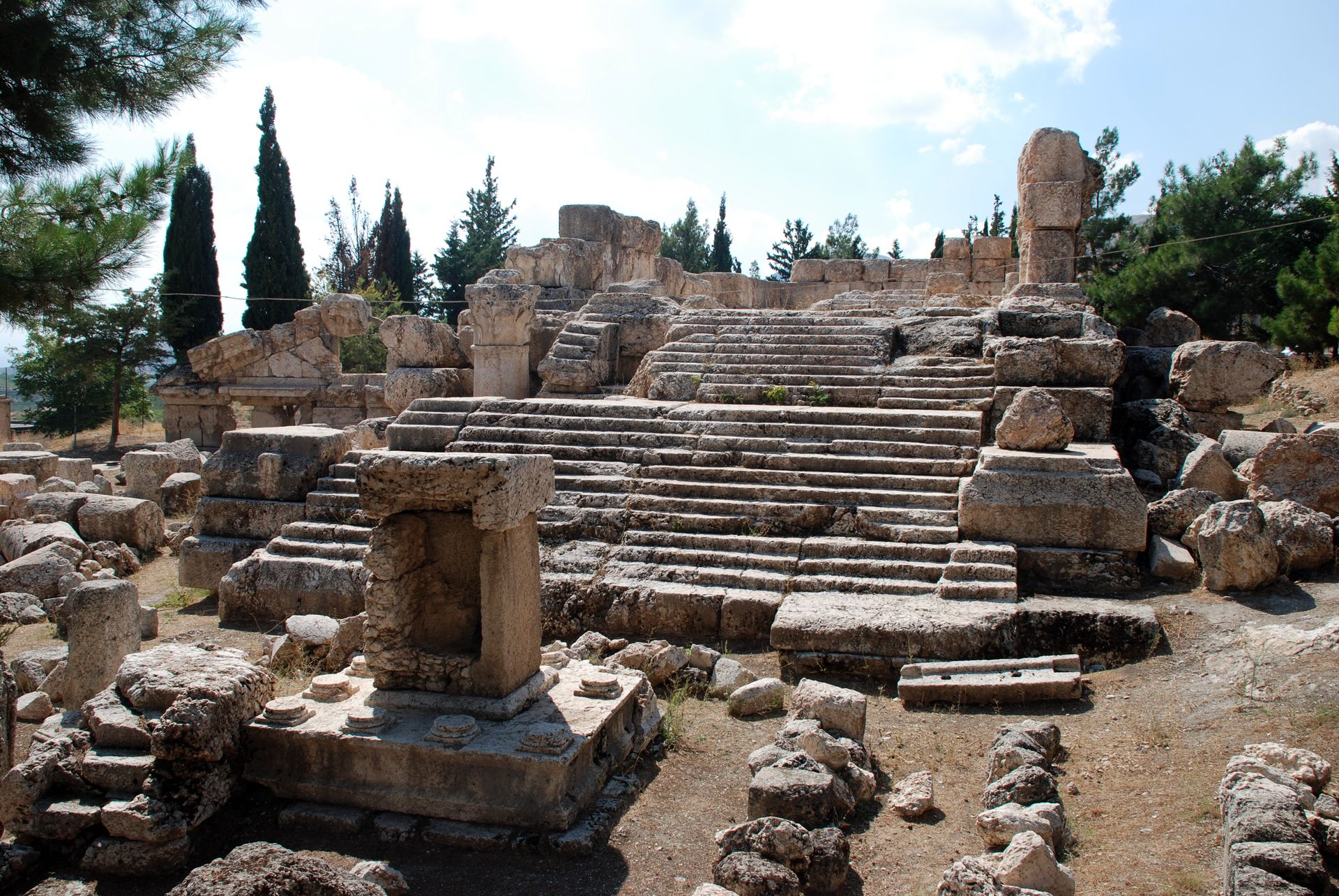

- Location within Lebanon
- 34.0875°N 36.117778°E
- Region: Baalbek

Site notes
- Condition: Ruins
- Public access: Yes

Qasr el Banat (Arabic: قصر البنات) is an ancient temple situated 1.5 kilometres (0.93 mi) east of Chlifa in the Baalbek District of the Beqaa Governorate in the city of Qsarnaba (Lebanon).

== History ==
It is believed the site was called the "Castle of Virgins" and was the residence of virgins in Roman times.

By the middle of the 2nd century, the Romans had built many small temples and other sanctuaries in the vicinity of the temple district of Heliopolis, today's Baalbek, on the edge of the Bekaa. They were pilgrimage destinations for the inhabitants of the big cities on the coast. One of the Roman processional streets, partly carved out of the rock, led from here directly to the mountain temples of Hosn Niha. One of the most famous is the one in the village of Qsarnaba, called now "Qasr El Banaat".

George F. Taylor classified Qasr el Banat among a group of ancient Roman Temples of the Beqaa Valley. It is suggested to date to Ancient Roman, but it is possible that it was originally built, as a very small temple, during Ancient Greek eras or earlier. The temple is located on a rocky plateau, accessible by a climb up a hill at an altitude of 1,100 meters (3,600 ft). The top of the hill is covered in various platforms, cisterns, tanks and steps that have been carved out of solid bedrock. Within the remains is a small antae temple, constructed of large square blocks that was used as a fortress in later times. Some sections remain intact built up two or three layers high. A basilica (probably Byzantine Christian) from a later period was built alongside the temple.

There are two circular structures located around 100 metres (330 ft) southeast of the temple that are thought to have been examples of the high places referred to in the Bible.

== Characteristics ==
The Prostylos Temple of Qsarnaba, with the entrance on the east side, stood on a high platform, reached by a wide flight of steps with over 20 steps. The walls of the podium were moved to the east and formed a lateral conclusion of the stairs. The mighty limestone curbs of the former Cella wall, which are distributed on the site, are weathered to some extent to the shapelessness. In 1974, the first phase of the restoration was completed, in which up to three rows of temple walls could be restored. In the middle section of the cella, the stepped base of a raised cult place can be seen. A separate sacrificial altar stands outside in the east at the foot of the staircase.

== See also ==
- Temples of the Beqaa Valley
- Roman Phoenicia
