= Temnin el-Foka =

Village in Baalbek-Hermel, Lebanon

Temnin el-Foka تمنين الفوقا
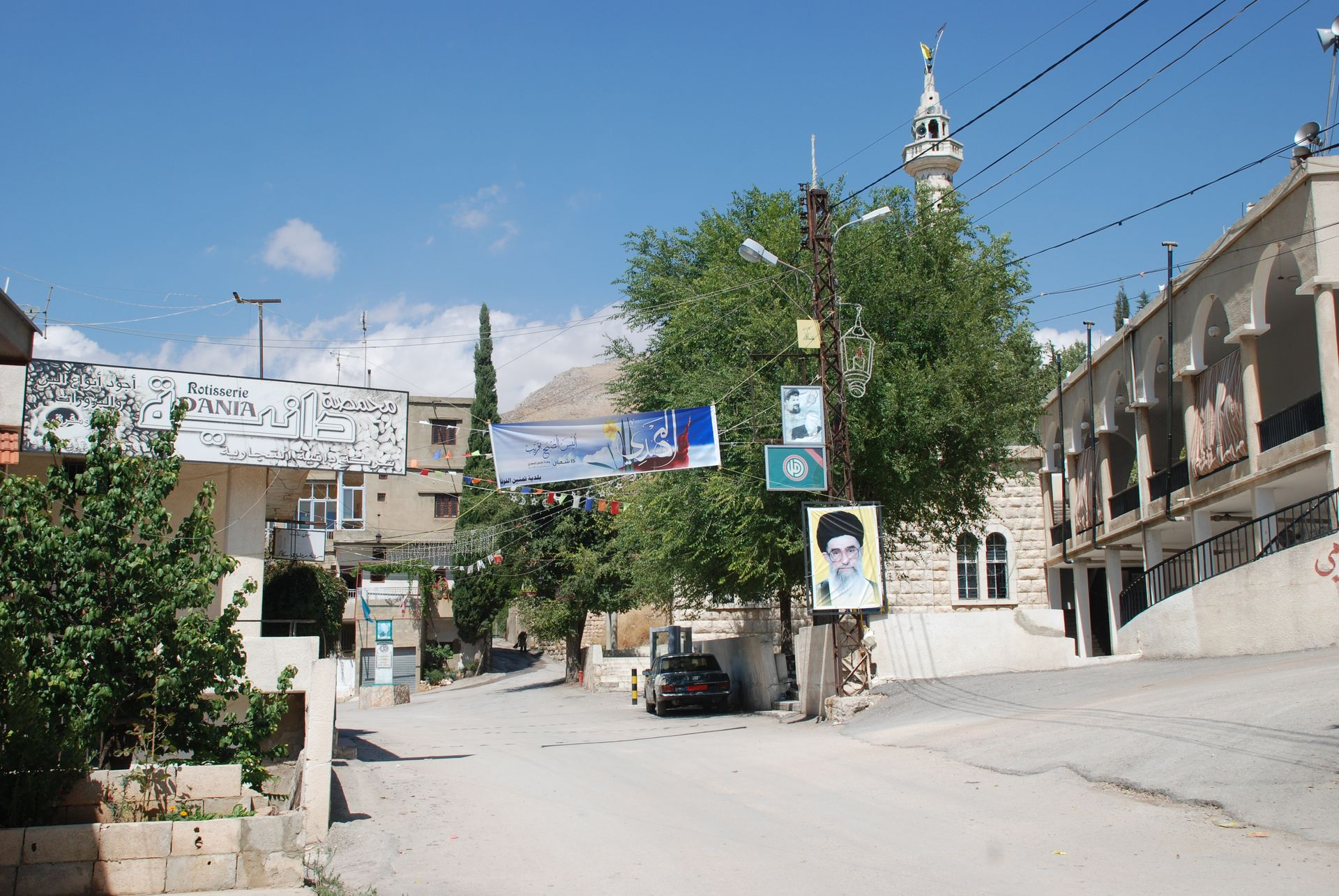
- Temnine el-Faouqa, Lebanon, center of village

- Location in Lebanon
- Coordinates: 33°54′N 35°59′E
- Country: Lebanon
- Governorate: Baalbek-Hermel
- District: Baalbek
- Elevation: 3,600 ft (1,100 m)
- Time zone: UTC+2 (EET)
  - Summer (DST): +3

Temnin el-Foka (Arabic: تمنين الفوقا) is a village located approximately 28 kilometers southwest of Baalbek in the Baalbek District, in the Beqaa Valley of Lebanon, at an altitude of 1100 meters above sea level. The village is famous for its Roman nymphaeum which is close to the spring of Ain el-Jobb.

== History ==
Temnin was settled since Roman times, but the original name is unknown. The town is divided into two municipalities, the other being Temnine Et Tahta.

Ottoman tax registers from 1533–1548 indicate the village had 64 households and 11 bachelors, and one Imam, all Muslims.

In 1838, Eli Smith noted Temnin el-Foka's (or "Temnin the upper") population as being predominantly Metawileh.

== The Roman nymphaeum ==
The nymphaeum is an arched watercourse built of large stones that has been constructed 4 metres (13 ft) deep into a hill. It leads to a cistern underground. A gully has formed at the outflow, where a boundary pillar is carved with the image of a goddess. It resembles a similar cippus at Kafr Zabad.

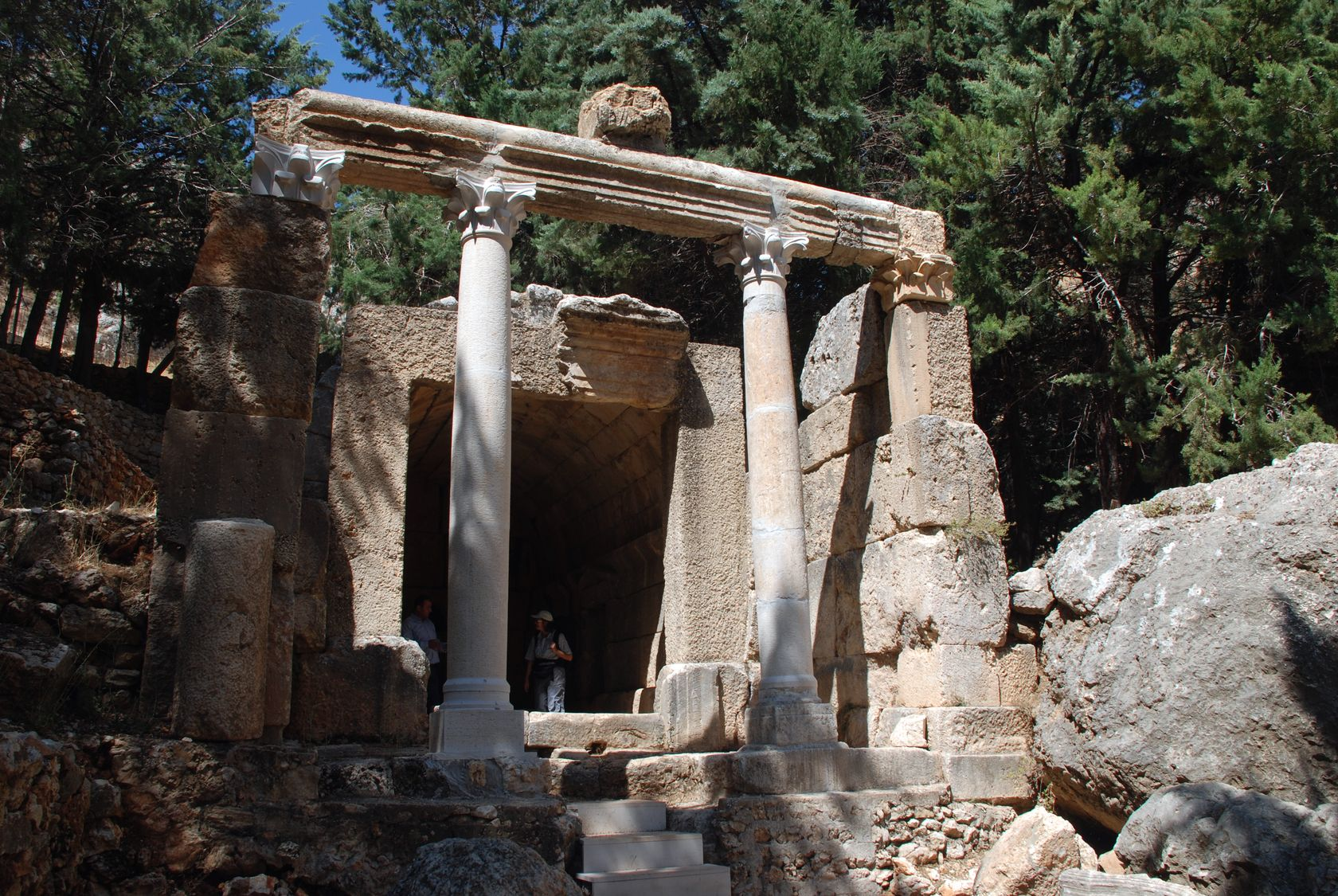
The famous "Roman nymphaeum"

The inner walls consist of four layers of massive, roughly hewn cuboids up to the vault.

Only the vaulted arch and two rows of stones on the side walls were preserved before the restoration. The stone blocks of the side walls were piled up again, the pillars and capitals are largely new.

During the 2024 Israeli invasion of Lebanon, UNESCO gave enhanced protection to 34 cultural sites in Lebanon including the Spring of Ain el Jobb archaeological site to safeguard it from damage.

Temnin el-Foka
- Interactive map of Temnin el-Foka
- Cultures: Roman

Site notes
- Condition: Ruins
- Public access: Yes

== See also ==
- Roman gardens
- Temples of the Beqaa Valley

== Bibliography ==
- Robinson, E.; Smith, E. (1841). Biblical Researches in Palestine, Mount Sinai and Arabia Petraea: A Journal of Travels in the year 1838. Vol. 3. Boston: Crocker & Brewster.
