= Mustafa Dirani =

Lebanese activist (born 1951)

Mustafa Dirani (Arabic: مصطفى الديراني; born 1951) is a former head of security in the Amal Movement in Lebanon. In 1987, he started reaching out to pro-Iran sources, and eventually established contact between them and the rest of the Amal leadership. He was eventually expelled from Amal and established his own organization, the "Believing Resistance".

Captured by Israeli forces in 1994, Dirani was held until a 2004 prisoner swap.

== Biography ==
Dirani was taken from his home in Kasarnaba in the eastern Beqaa by Israeli airborne commandos on 27 May 1994. He was held in administrative detention and was offered in exchange for Israeli servicemen held by Hezbollah. At the time, Israeli forces were in control of the southern-Lebanon security buffer, in order to prevent the region from being used as a launching ground by Hezbollah for attacks on Israel's Galilee region.

Israel believed that Dirani had exclusive knowledge concerning the whereabouts of Israel Air Force navigator Ron Arad, who was captured by Dirani's armed men in 1986, and has been unheard of since then. During his interrogation by military officers, Dirani reportedly disclosed that Arad had been turned over first to a Hezbollah unit and then to Iranian Revolutionary Guards, who were in Lebanon at the time aiding Hezbollah guerrillas. Neither Iran nor any guerrilla group has ever offered any useful information about Arad's fate. Allegedly, Dirani received $300,000 for transferring Ron Arad to the Iranians.

Dirani alleges that he was sodomized and tortured by his Israeli captors. He testified in an Israeli court to this abuse. The allegations were reported by the Associated Press, Al Jazeera, and The Jerusalem Post. Initially, the International Red Cross was denied permission to see Dirani, but a court order forced Israeli prison authorities to comply with legal rules. In 2015, it was reported that in a 4-3 decision, the Israeli supreme court ruled that Dirani could not continue with his lawsuit against the nation, after a lengthy court battle.

In January 2004, in a German-mediated prisoner swap, Dirani, along with 22 other Lebanese detainees, about 400 Palestinians, and 12 Israeli-Arab prisoners, was released in exchange for the bodies of three Israeli soldiers and abducted Israeli businessman Elchanan Tannenbaum.
