= Nahle, Lebanon =

Nahlé
- Village
- Interactive map of Nahlé
- Country: Lebanon
- Governorate: Baalbek-Hermel
- District: Baalbek

Nahlé
- نحله (Levantine Arabic)
- Location within Lebanon
- 34.05833°N 36.29944°E
- Cultures: Roman
- Location: 6 kilometres (3.7 mi) northeast of Baalbek
- Region: Baalbek

Site notes
- Condition: Ruins
- Public access: Yes

Nahlé (Levantine Arabic: نحله, romanized: Naḥleh) is a village situated 6 kilometres (3.7 mi) northeast of Baalbek in Baalbek District, Baalbek-Hermel Governorate, Lebanon. It has the ruins of a Roman temple.

== Name ==
The Lebanese town of Nahlé derives its name from the Arabic word “نحلة” (Naḥleh), meaning “honeybee.” This interpretation reflects a connection to nature, potentially emphasizing the industrious and community-oriented qualities associated with bees. Additionally, Nahlé is known for its ancient history, including Roman-era ruins, suggesting that the name could also carry historical or cultural significance tied to its origins.

== History ==
Nahle was probably founded during Roman rule of the region, that was called in the first century Roman Phoenicia.

The 13th-century geographer Yaqut al-Hamawi listed Nahlah in his geographical dictionary, with its entry being "a village lying 3 miles from Ba'labakk".

In 1838, Eli Smith noted Nahleh as a Metawileh village in the Baalbek area. Actually Nahle is located above a valley.

== Roman temple ==
There are the ruins of a Roman temple in the village that are included in a group of Temples of the Beqaa Valley.

The temple foundations are made of gigantic blocks of stone, upon which sit the remains of a podium. The podium has a long inscription written on it that is now almost impossible to read. The huge foundations indicate that there was a huge temple over these foundations during Roman centuries.

This sanctuary consisted of two parts: an open air court and a large room with a ceiling where notches for the wooden beam still exist. Only a few courses of stone are still standing.

During the 2024 Israeli invasion of Lebanon, UNESCO gave enhanced protection to 34 cultural sites in Lebanon including the temple at Nahlé to safeguard it from damage.

== Bibliography ==
- Robinson, E.; Smith, E. (1841). Biblical Researches in Palestine, Mount Sinai and Arabia Petraea: A Journal of Travels in the year 1838. Vol. 3. Boston: Crocker & Brewster.
