= Elhanan Tannenbaum =

Israeli drug smuggler and reserve officer kidnapped by Hezbollah in 2000 (1946–2024)

- אלחנן טננבוים
- Born: 12 August 1946; Poland
- Died: 7 October 2024 (aged 78); Israel
- Occupations: Gambler, failed businessman, drug smuggler and reserve officer in the IDF
- Children: Ori Tannenbaum; Keren Tannenbaum

Elhanan Tannenbaum, (Hebrew: אלחנן טננבוים; 12 August 1946 – 7 October 2024) was an Israeli businessman and a Colonel in the Israel Defense Forces Reserves known for having been captured by Hezbollah. In 2000, the badly indebted Tannenbaum was lured to Dubai under the pretense of a drug deal, kidnapped, and transported to Lebanon by Hezbollah operatives. Four years later, Tannenbaum was released in a prisoner exchange for 435 Arab prisoners held by Israel. After his release from Hezbollah, Tannenbaum made a plea bargain and was not charged for any crime in Israel.

== Early life ==
Elhanan Tannenbaum was born in Poland, the son of Holocaust survivors. Most of his relatives had been killed in the Holocaust. In 1949, Tannenbaum and his parents and sister immigrated to Israel and moved to Holon, where Tannenbaum grew up and attended high school. He was also active in the local scouts movement.

At the age of 18, Tannenbaum enrolled in the Hebrew University of Jerusalem, studying economics and political science. He began his compulsory military service in the Israel Defense Forces during his academic studies, and served in the Artillery Corps between 1965 and 1968. After graduating, he completed his active military service as an officer. He then studied business administration at Tel Aviv University. After his discharge from active service, he served as a reservist officer in the IDF Artillery Corps. Tannenbaum saw action in the Six-Day War, the War of Attrition, and the Yom Kippur War. He eventually reached the rank of colonel in the Artillery Corps reserves.

== Capture ==
In 2000, Tannenbaum, who was in debt due to gambling and business failures, was approached by his childhood friend Qais Obeid, an Israeli-Arab, who was working for Hezbollah, and who had previously been tried by an IDF military court in the Gaza Strip for a planned operation to abduct an Israeli in Gaza and taking him to Lebanon by boat. Obeid, along with Lebanese Hezbollah operative Kaid Biro, was planning to abduct Tannenbaum in Dubai and take him to Lebanon for Hezbollah to use as a bargaining chip. Obeid offered Tannenbaum a part in an alleged lucrative drug-dealing operation. Tannenbaum was told he would have to fly to Dubai, and his role would be to consult Obeid on how to smuggle drugs into Israel.

In December 2006, Tannenbaum admitted to having knowingly gone to Dubai in 2000 to complete a drug deal, and said that he had expected to make $200,000 (€152,000) on the deal.

On the night of 3 October 2000, Tannenbaum flew to Brussels, where he met Obeid and Biro, who gave him a forged Venezuelan passport. From there, he caught a flight to Frankfurt, and boarded a Gulf Air flight to Dubai. He was met there by a man holding a sign with his name, who took him to a limousine. Tannenbaum claimed that he was then driven to an affluent neighborhood in Dubai, where he was attacked by two or three individuals and blacked out after being beaten with a club. Tannenbaum was then flown to Lebanon on a private plane.

Hezbollah leader Hassan Nasrallah declared on 16 October 2000 on al-Manar TV station: "We have an Israeli colonel in our hands". Israel was initially unsure who that person might be, until Nasrallah confirmed it was Tannenbaum a few days later. According to Israeli journalist Ronen Bergman, Tannenbaum held an important position in the IDF Northern Command, doing 150 days of reserve duty a year, and was privy to many important military secrets. Bergman wrote that only five days before Tannenbaum's abduction, he was on reserve duty at the Northern Command bunker in Safed overseeing a sensitive exercise: a simulation of a full-scale war with Hezbollah and Syria. Tannenbaum could have exposed the details of Israel's war plans to Hezbollah.

Following the abduction operation, Obeid moved to Lebanon to avoid prosecution in Israel, and was considered a wanted fugitive by the Israeli government.

== Prisoner exchange ==
Tannenbaum was released in January 2004 as part of a prisoner swap with Hezbollah. The swap, mediated by Germany, resulted in the exchange of 435 prisoners held by Israel in return for Tannenbaum's release and the return of the bodies of three soldiers killed during an ambush along the Israeli-Lebanese border. Among the 435 people released were Mustafa Dirani and Abdel Karim Obeid. These two individuals were kidnapped, in 1994 and 1989 respectively, for use as bargaining chips in the effort to secure the release of the most famous of the Israeli MIAs, Ron Arad. Fearing the release of these men would end any hope of finding Arad, his family attempted to take legal action to prevent their release. Nothing came of this effort.

While campaigning against the proposed Gilad Shalit prisoner exchange Mossad Chief Meir Dagan in 2011 claimed that 231 Israelis were killed by terrorists freed in the Tannenbaum exchange deal.

== Later life ==
Following his release and arrival in Israel, Tannenbaum was arrested for his illegal actions that led up to his capture. He agreed to a plea bargain and admitted to the reasons behind his travel to Dubai and described the details of his capture. In exchange, he was not charged with any crime and served no prison time.

Tannenbaum continued to be heavily in debt from his past dealings, owing payment to the National Insurance Institute, mortgage debts, compensation for bad checks, as well as other debts along with monthly alimony to his ex-wife. In 2005, he was arrested and detained for 10 days after failing to pay alimony. He told the court that at the time, he had no source of income and was living in his sister's home. In October 2006, he began studying law, and in 2008 was working as a taxi driver. In 2010, he was arrested for failing to pay debts totaling some NIS 2 million ($550,000). While in court, he claimed that he had recently completed his law studies and was about to begin an internship.

== Personal life and death ==
Tannenbaum married in 1971, and had a son, Ori, and a daughter, Keren. Tannenbaum later divorced his wife.

Tannenbaum died on 7 October 2024, at the age of 78.

== See also ==
- List of kidnappings
