= Sfira =

Village in the Miniyeh-Danniyeh District in the North Governorate of Lebanon

Sfira سفيرة Mrah Es-Sfire
- Location within Lebanon
- Coordinates: 34°23′57″N 36°02′55″E
- Country: Lebanon
- Governorate: North Governorate
- Districts of Lebanon: Miniyeh-Danniyeh District

Area
  - Total: 5.71 km^{2} (2.20 sq mi)
- Time zone: +2
  - Summer (DST): +3

Sfira, also spelled Mrah Es-Sfire (Arabic: مراح السفيرة), is a Sunni Muslim village located in Miniyeh-Danniyeh District, in the North Governorate of Lebanon. In the 2009 elections, it had 4,449 eligible voters. It is bounded on the north by Kfarbnine, on the south by Beit El Faqs, on the west by the mountain of Sfira and on the east by the western Lebanese chain.

== Demographics ==
In 2014, Muslims made up 62.44% and Christians made up 37.56% of registered voters in Sfira. 62.31% of the voters were Sunni Muslims and 35.43% were Maronite Catholics.
