= Kasarnaba =

Town in Baalbek-Hermel, Lebanon

Kasarnaba قصرنبا
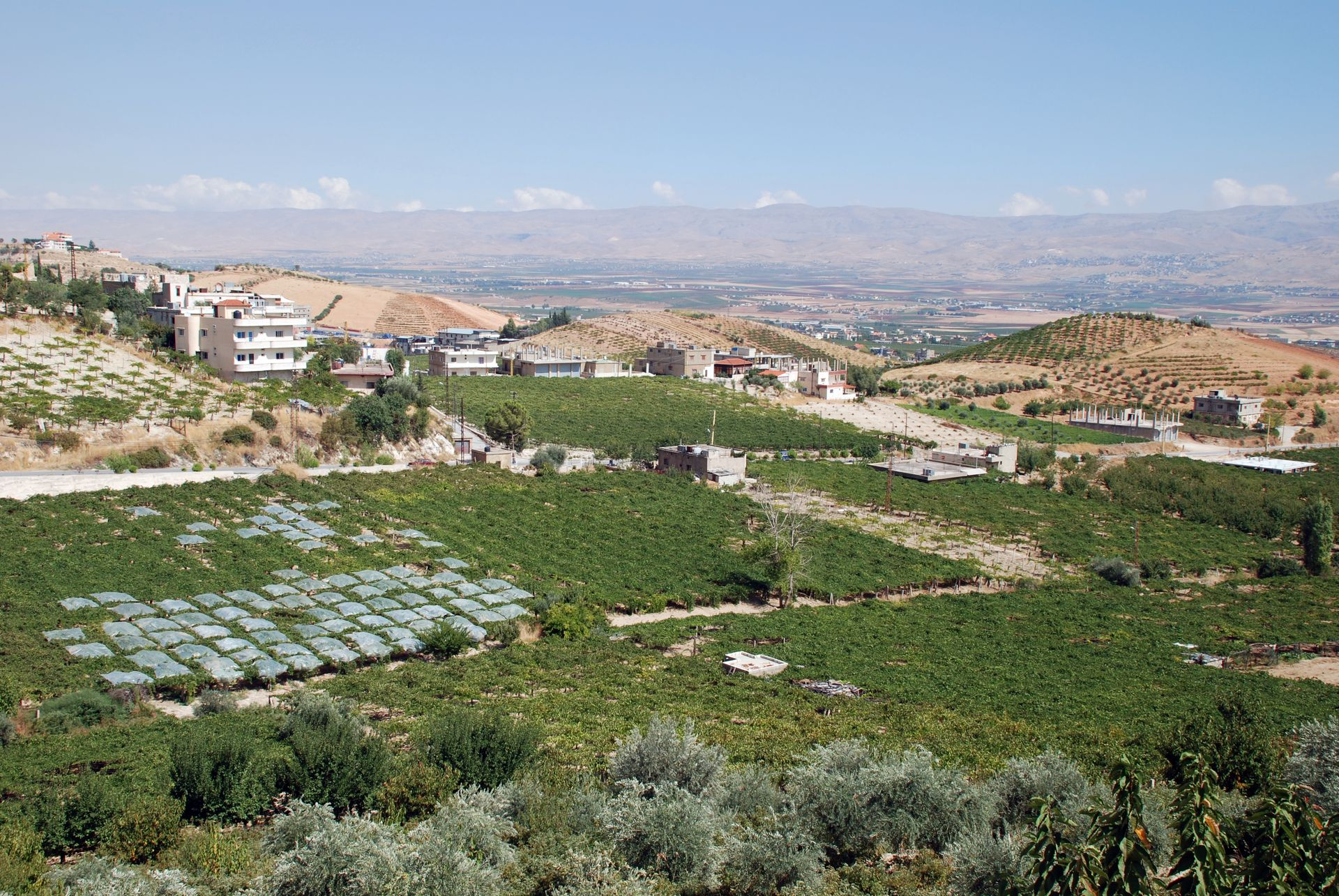
- Grapes in vineyard below village of Qsarnaba

- Location in Lebanon
- Coordinates: 33°54′52″N 35°59′22″E
- Country: Lebanon
- Governorate: Baalbek-Hermel
- District: Baalbek
- Elevation: 3,970 ft (1,210 m)
- Time zone: UTC+2 (EET)
  - Summer (DST): +3

Kasarnaba (Arabic: قصرنبا, romanized: Qaṣarnabā) is a town in Baalbek District, Baalbek-Hermel Governorate, Lebanon famous for its hilly terrain and traditional agricultural practices. Kasarnaba is an overwhelmingly Shia Muslim town.

== Geography ==
The town is located at the shoulder of The Western Lebanese Mountain Range just to the East of Mount Sanine specifically and it overlooks the central parts of Beqaa Valley.

== History ==
A Roman Temple is found in this town, called "Castra El Banaat".

In 1838, Eli Smith noted Kasarnaba's population to be predominantly Metawileh.

People in Kasarnaba are traditionally farmers famous for growing vineyards and wild rose flowers for rosewater extraction, in addition to many other traditional Horticultural crops some of which are listed below.

In 1994 Mustafa Dirani was abducted by Israeli forces from his home in Kasarnaba. He was held (without charge) by Israel until 2004.

== Traditional Crops ==
- Grapes
- Cherries
- Apricots
- Common Fig
- Roses (for Rosewater)
- Tobacco

== Landscape ==
Kasarnaba has many hills creating deep valleys in between including:
- Wadi El Hawr
- Wadi El Debs
- Wadi El Boss
- Wadi Neita
- Wadi ain el Louis
- wadi ain al chaghour
- wadi al zaraet
- wadi al toghra
- wadi malek

== Bibliography ==
- Robinson, E.; Smith, E. (1841). Biblical Researches in Palestine, Mount Sinai and Arabia Petraea: A Journal of Travels in the year 1838. Vol. 3. Boston: Crocker & Brewster.
