= Serraaine El Faouqa =

Saraain El Faouqa سرعين الفوقا Serain, Serain Al Fawka, Saarain
- Village
- Interactive map of Saraain El Faouqa
- Country: Lebanon
- Governorate: Baalbek-Hermel
- District: Baalbek

Saraain El Faouqa
- Serain, Serain Al Fawka
- Location within Lebanon
- 33.87864°N 36.09288°E
- Type: Surface site and Roman temple
- Periods: Mousterian, Levalloiso-Mousterian, Shepherd Neolithic, Ancient Rome
- Location: 6 kilometres (3.7 mi) northeast of Rayak, Lebanon

Site notes
- Excavation dates: 1946
- Archaeologists: Henri Fleisch
- Public access: Yes

Saraain El Faouqa (Arabic: سرعين الفوقا, romanized: Serʿayn al-Fawqā) is a village located 6 kilometres (3.7 mi) northeast of Rayak in Baalbek District, Baalbek-Hermel Governorate, Lebanon. Most of its inhabitants Shia Muslims and a minority are Maronites.

== Archaeology ==
There is an archaeological site located on the right of the road from Rayak, immediately before the village. It was discovered by Henri Fleisch in 1946 and mentioned by L. Burkhalter in a list of prehistoric sites published in 1948. Various small bifaces, flakes and cores were found that were originally assessed to be Mousterian by Burkhalter. Fleisch was said to "deplore the lack of typology" to distinguish the assemblage, but suggested some pieces were similar to Levalloiso-Mousterian and the Shepherd Neolithic tools found at Rayak North and Fleywe.

== Roman Temple, quarry and tombs ==
The village of Sarain El Faouqa is suggested to have been built on the remains of a Roman quarry. There is a Roman temple on the left within the village that is included in a group of Temples of the Beqaa Valley. There are also numerous rock-cut tombs visible nearby. Although the walls of the temple cella have long since disappeared, the podium still remains. Further remains were found when a house that had been built on the temple was demolished, revealing part of a cast door frame, a block from the ceiling and parts of a column base and shaft.
