= George Francis Taylor =

British numismatist, historian and archaeologist

George Francis Taylor (died 28 March 2011) was a British scholar, archaeologist, historian, and numismatist.

Taylor was a professor of English at the American University in Beirut from 1960 until 1970. He was a member of the Royal Numismatic Society; he published studies on ancient coins in various numismatic books and journals. He had a wife, Norma, with whom he had a daughter. After his return from his teaching position in Beirut, he resumed teaching at the Brighton Technical College, in Sussex.

== The Roman temples of Lebanon ==
Taylor traveled to Lebanon and documented little known ancient sites and temples. In 1967 he published a book called 'The Roman Temples of Lebanon: a pictorial guide'. He categorized the temples of Lebanon into three groups; Temples of Mount Hermon, Temples of the Beqaa Valley and Temples of the Lebanese coastal plain. Taylor humbly admitted that he was only an amateur archaeologist trying to unravel the ancient mysteries of Lebanon and referred to his publication as a "book by an amateur, for an amateur". This has not stopped it being used as an authoritative reference on the subject for several decades.
