= Antae temple =

Name given to a type of ancient Greek or Roman temple

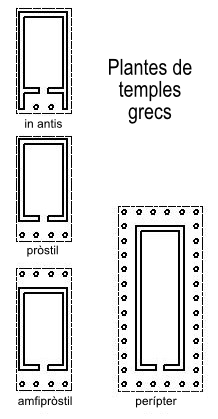
Antae, Prostylos, Amphi-prostylos and Peripteral temple layouts

An antae temple, also a distyle in antis temple, is a special name given to a type of ancient Greek or Roman temple that has side walls that extend to form a porch at the front or rear (or both) and terminated in structural pillars that were called the antae. If columns were placed in advance of the walls or antae, the temple was termed prostyle and if columns surrounded the temple it was termed peripteral.

== See also ==
- Anta capital
- Ancient Greek architecture
