= Beit El Faqs =

Village in the Miniyeh-Danniyeh District in the North gov. of Lebanon

Beit El Faqs بيت الفقس
- Interactive map of Beit El Faqs
- Coordinates: 34°23′43″N 36°03′01″E
- Country: Lebanon
- Governorate: North Governorate
- Districts of Lebanon: Miniyeh-Danniyeh District
- Time zone: +2
  - Summer (DST): +3

Beit El Faqs (Arabic: بيت الفقس) is a Sunni Muslim village located in the Miniyeh-Danniyeh District in the North Governorate of Lebanon.

== Demographics ==
In 2014, Muslims made up 99.94% of registered voters in Beit El Faqs. 99.55% of the voters were Sunni Muslims.
