= Qalaat Tannour =

Archaeological site in Lebanon

- Castle of Enlightenment
- Location within Lebanon
- 33.927222°N 36.144722°E
- Type: Surface site / Hill
- Periods: Shepherd Neolithic, Roman
- Location: 12 kilometres (7.5 mi) southwest of Baalbek, Lebanon

Site notes
- Excavation dates: 1966
- Archaeologists: M. Besançon
- Public access: Yes

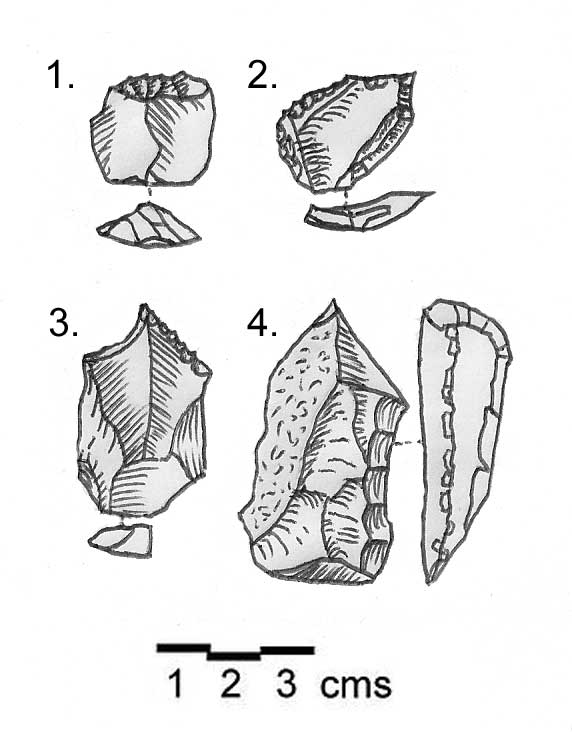
Shepherd Neolithic flint tools discovered at Kamouh el Hermel. 1. End scraper on a flake. 2. Transverse scraper and awl on a thin flake. 3. Borer on a flake blade. 4. Burin with a wide working edge on a heavy flake. All in matt brown flint.

Qalaat Tannour is a Shepherd Neolithic archaeological site located halfway between Britel and Haour Taala, 12 kilometres (7.5 mi) southwest of Baalbek in the Baalbek District of the Baalbek-Hermel Governorate in Lebanon.

The surface site was discovered by M. Besançon in 1966 on a hill of exposed limestone rocks. It was the furthest south of all of the Shepherd Neolithic sites catalogued at the time. Flint tools found at the location were generally in a brown or grey, some showing a white patina. Blade types were typically short but also included thin and backed varieties, steep-scrapers and cores. The material was stored with the Saint Joseph University, Museum of Lebanese Prehistory.

Several Roman tombs were also noted at the site.
