= El Ain, Baalbek =

El Ain العين
- Location in Lebanon
- Coordinates: 34.228°N 36.372°E
- Country: Lebanon
- Governorate: Baalbek-Hermel
- District: Baalbek
- Elevation: 3,300 ft (1,000 m)

Population
  - Total: 30,000
- Time zone: UTC+2 (EET)
  - Summer (DST): +3

El Ain (Arabic: العين, romanized: al-ʿAyn), Al Ain, or Ain is a village at an elevation of 1,000 metres (3,300 ft) on a foothill of the Anti-Lebanon Mountains in the Baalbek District of the Baalbek-Hermel Governorate, Lebanon. It is famous for agriculture and trade, located on the highway connecting Syrian borders and the Hermel area with Chtaura and Beirut.

Its name, Ain, refers to the old water source within its boundaries.

== History ==
In 1838, Eli Smith noted El Ain's population as being predominantly Metawileh.

== Geography and Agriculture ==
The altitude of this village ranges from 900 to 1300 meters above sea level. The village is 125 km away from Beirut situated between the towns of Labwe and Fakiha. Its economy is restricted to agriculture (figs, olives, apples, pomegranate, apricots, peach and grapes). Many sources of water are distributed all around the village.

== Weather Conditions ==
Winters in El Ain are cold and dry, with temperatures rarely reaching freezing point (-7° to -10°). On average, it snows three to five times per season. Summers are very hot and dry, with temperatures rarely reaching 40 °C. The average annual rainfall is 230 mm (9 in).

== Notable people ==
- Ali Hussain Sibat, Lebanese television presenter
- Mohamad Safwan (born 2003), Lebanese footballer

== Sources ==
- (Mapquest)

== Bibliography ==
- Robinson, E.; Smith, E. (1841). Biblical Researches in Palestine, Mount Sinai and Arabia Petraea: A Journal of Travels in the year 1838. Vol. 3. Boston: Crocker & Brewster.
