= Hermel =

Hermel الهرمل
- Location in Lebanon
- Coordinates: 34°23′29″N 36°23′45″E
- Country: Lebanon
- Governorate: Baalbek-Hermel Governorate
- District: Hermel District

Area
  - Total: 136.4 km^{2} (52.7 sq mi)
- Elevation: 780 m (2,560 ft)

Population
  - Total: 22,250
  - Density: 660/km^{2} (1,700/sq mi)
- Time zone: UTC+2 (EET)
  - Summer (DST): +3

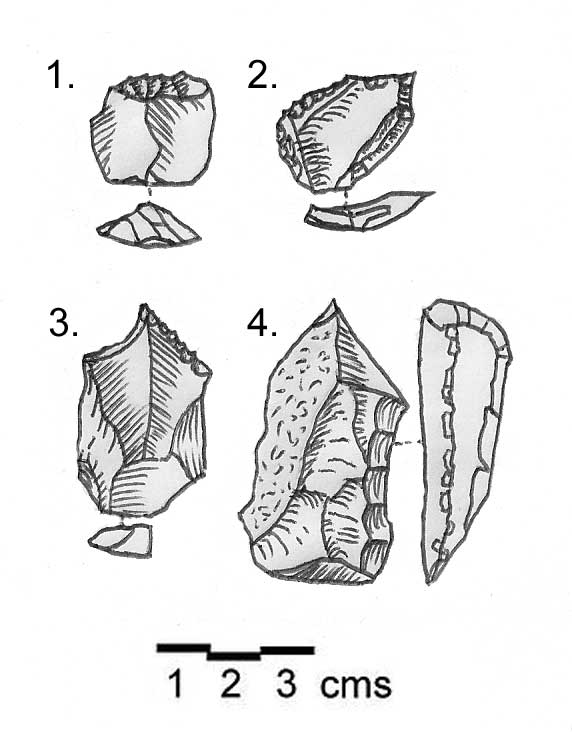
Shepherd Neolithic flint tools discovered at Kamouh el Hermel. 1. End scraper on a flake. 2. Transverse scraper and awl on a thin flake. 3. Borer on a flake blade. 4. Burin with a wide working edge on a heavy flake. All in matt brown flint.

Hermel (Levantine Arabic: الهرمل, romanized: al-Hermel) is a town in Baalbek-Hermel Governorate, Lebanon. It is the capital of Hermel District. Hermel is home to a Lebanese Red Cross First Aid Center. Hermel's inhabitants are predominantly Shia Muslims.

There is an ancient pyramid known as Kamouh el Hermel (Pyramid or Needle of Hermel) located about 6 kilometres (3.7 mi) south of the town that is a popular attraction for local tourists.

== History ==
In 1519 and 1545, the town was under the Ottoman administration of the nahiyah ("subdistrict") of Manasef, and tax records indicate it had 50 households, all Muslims. The town's population swelled after the Hamade family and their associated Shia clans left Mount Lebanon to settle in Hermel and its surroundings, which were already part of the Hamade's tax-concessions since 1668.

On February 6, 2025, there were reports detailing gunfire from light and medium weapons, which were heard from Lebanese villages near Hermel. The violent clashes were in the town of Hawik between the Zaayter and Jaafar clans on the Lebanese side and Hayat Tahrir al-Sham (HTS) on the Syrian side.

== Archaeology ==
=== Hermel plains ===
The Hermel plains are an area of low hills around Hermel, through which runs the Orontes River and several wadis, which drain into the Homs basin. The area dominates the north of the Beqaa Valley and reaches north to the border with Syria. A curious and unpublished archaeological industry exists from finds of stone tools in this area. It consists of generally small tools whose typology is limited. It was termed the Shepherd Neolithic industry by Henri Fleisch.

=== Hermel I (Mrah Abbas) ===
Hermel I or Mrah Abbas was discovered by Shiat Ali el Karar w beit hmede and is 5 kilometres (3.1 mi) north northeast of Hermel, 1 kilometre (0.62 mi) before reaching Mrah Abbas, next to the road. It is located on an uncultivated sloping plain leading down 2 kilometres (1.2 mi) from the Orontes River. The garden revealed the remains of ten dolmens, most of which were built on a larger foundation than the covered chamber. Some were perhaps not covered by tumuli and a few were evidently not built to have cap-stones on top.

=== Hermel II (Jisr el Aassi) ===
Hermel II or Jisr el Aassi is 2 kilometres (1.2 mi) east of Hermel I near the gorge through which the Orontes River flows. It was found by P. Billaux and mentioned by Maurice Tallon in 1958 who made a lengthy description of the largest tumulus in 1959. The lithic industry at the site was discussed by Henri Fleisch in 1966. Several dolmens were found around the village of Choueighir, around 1 kilometre (0.62 mi) north of the bridge over the Orontes, in and around the village extending about 2 kilometres (1.2 mi) to the north along the track next to the river. Some of the dolmen are inclined inwards forming a pyramid shape. There is a large tumulus north of the village that is composed of massive blocks where pottery was found and dated to the Early Bronze Age III by Tallon. Henri Fleisch found a collection of Shepherd Neolithic flints around these dolmen.

=== Hermel III (Choueighir) ===
Hermel III or Choueighir is a village on the left (western) bank of the Orontes and an archaeological site was found by P. Billaux 2 kilometres (1.2 mi) to the north of it. Flint material was described to be of the Shepherd Neolithic type and similar to that of Maakne and el Qaa by Henri Fleisch in 1966, it is held in the Museum of Lebanese Prehistory.

=== Hermel IV (Wadi el Joz) ===
Hermel IV or Wadi el Joz is a collection of megaliths that are 1.5 kilometres (0.93 mi) east of Hermel Attika, southeast of Hermel on dry terraces that slope towards the channel of the Orontes. It was found by Mohammed Hamadé, surveyed by P. Billaux and published by Maurice Tallon in 1959. A number of tumuli were discovered in this area which covered chambers on rectangular foundation platforms. They were usually orientated east to west with some remnants of walls constructed of megalithic stones. Maurice Tallon made collections of flint and pottery from the area dating to various periods. These included an incised sherd and a tanged scraper from the very earliest Neolithic times, an Early Bronze Age flat scraper along with later Middle Bronze Age and Iron Age material.

== Demographics ==
Religion in Hermel (2014)
Religion	Percent
Shia Islam	98.35%
Sunni Islam	1.15%
Christian	0.25%
Others	0.25%

In 2014, Muslims made up 99.50% of registered voters in Hermel. 98.35% of the voters were Shiite Muslims.

== Climate ==
Climate data for Hermel(normals for 1932-1970)
Month	Jan	Feb	Mar	Apr	May	Jun	Jul	Aug	Sep	Oct	Nov	Dec	Year
Average precipitation mm (inches)	43.8 (1.72)	34.2 (1.35)	26.1 (1.03)	19.8 (0.78)	10.5 (0.41)	0.0 (0.0)	0.0 (0.0)	0.0 (0.0)	1.7 (0.07)	9.5 (0.37)	22.8 (0.90)	39.6 (1.56)	208 (8.19)
Average precipitation days (≥ 0.01 in)	4.7	4.4	3.9	3.0	1.7	0	0	0	0.2	2.0	3.5	4.7	28.1
Source: NCEI
