= Kamouh el Hermel =

Archaeological site in Lebanon

- Qamouh el Hermel, Pyramid of Hermel, Hermel Pyramid
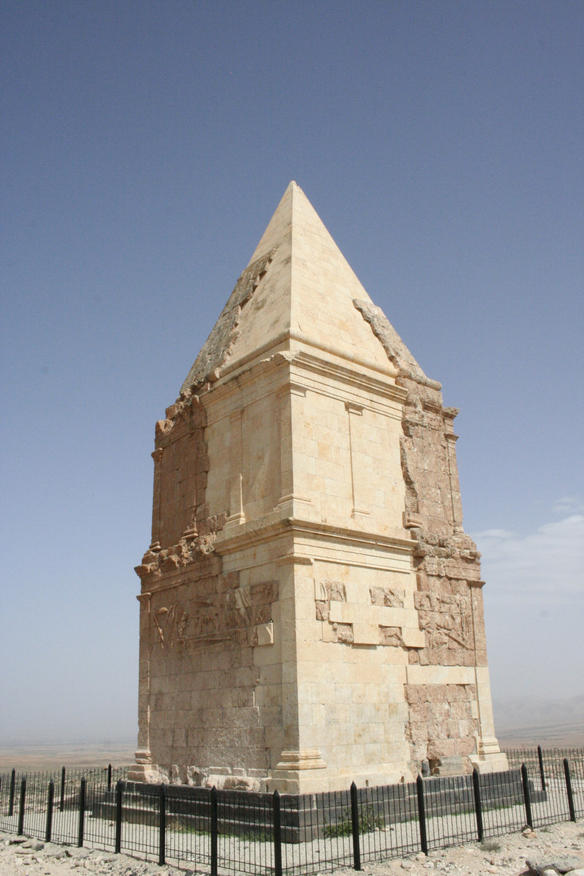
- Kamouh el Hermel (Pyramid of Hermel), 2008

- Location within Lebanon
- 34°21′51.6″N 36°24′57.0″E
- Periods: Shepherd Neolithic, Ancient Greece
- Location: Beqaa Valley, Lebanon

Site notes
- Archaeologists: Frank Skeels, Lorraine Copeland, René Dussaud
- Condition: restored in 1931, faces somewhat damaged
- Public access: Not fenced off

Kamouh el Hermel, the Pyramid of Hermel (Arabic: قاموع الهرمل, romanized: Qāmūʿ al-Harmal) (also known as God's Pyramid, House of El, the Funnel of Hermel or Needle of Hermel) is an ancient pyramid located 6 kilometres (3.7 mi) south of Hermel in Baalbek-Hermel Governorate, Lebanon.

== Location, description ==
The pyramid sits on top of a hill that is clearly visible from a distance and has been fenced off to prevent damage. Despite this, the monument was heavily vandalised by locals in 2000–2018, all the four faces of the base being covered with graffiti and no serious measures being taken by the authorities for its conservation. It is between 19.6 metres (64 ft) and 27 metres (89 ft) high and sits on a base measuring around 1.1 metres (3.6 ft) with three steps made from black basalt. On the base sit two massive limestone blocks weighing between 40 tonnes (40,000 kg) and 50 tonnes (50,000 kg). The blocks are around 7 metres (23 ft) high and 9 metres (30 ft) wide and are crowned by a pyramid measuring some 4.5 metres (15 ft) high. Some sections of the monument were restored in 1931. A relief on the north side depicts two deer, possibly caught in a hunting trap. On the east side is a carved image of a boar being attacked by dogs and speared. The south side is badly damaged but shows an image considered possibly to be a bear. The relief on the west side shows two wolves attacking a bull.

== Shepherd Neolithic archaeological site ==
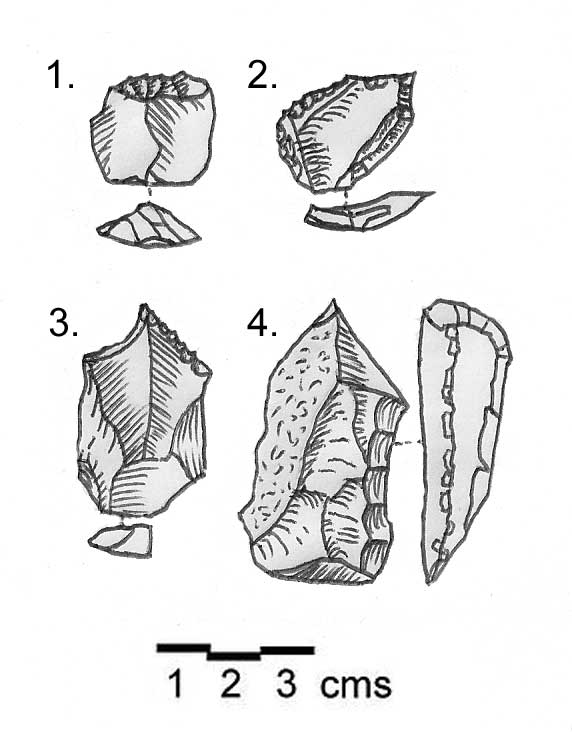
Shepherd Neolithic flint tools discovered at Kamouh el Hermel. 1. End scraper on a flake. 2. Transverse scraper and awl on a thin flake. 3. Borer on a flake blade. 4. Burin with a wide working edge on a heavy flake. All in matt brown flint.

Evidence was found of a Shepherd Neolithic archaeological site in the area around the monument, on the south and west of the hill. The site was discovered and a collection of flint tools used during the Neolithic Revolution was made by Lorraine Copeland and Frank Skeels in 1965. Materials recovered included blade-butts with scraping edges or notches, borers, cores (one with a twin edge) and small flakes. Some pieces were vaguely bifacial. The flints found were in a grey or chocolate-brown colour with some having a shiny patina.

== Modern identification ==
The pyramid has been suggested to date to the first or second century BC due to similarities with architecture of tower tombs of the late Seleucid era at Palmyra in Syria. It was considered by William McClure Thomson to possibly have been of Ancient Greek construction; however, the lack of inscriptions puzzled him as he thought the ancient Greeks to be a "scribbling generation". Thomson also entertained the notion, along with Charles William Meredith van de Velde that the construction may have been Assyrian. René Dussaud later suggested that although the reliefs resembled the Ishtar Gate, the edifice was likely a monument to the hunting prowess of a member of Syrian royalty from the first century BC.

== See also ==
- Mausoleum at Halicarnassus
- Horvat Midras
- Tomb of Hamrath
- Tomb of the Maccabees

== Gallery ==
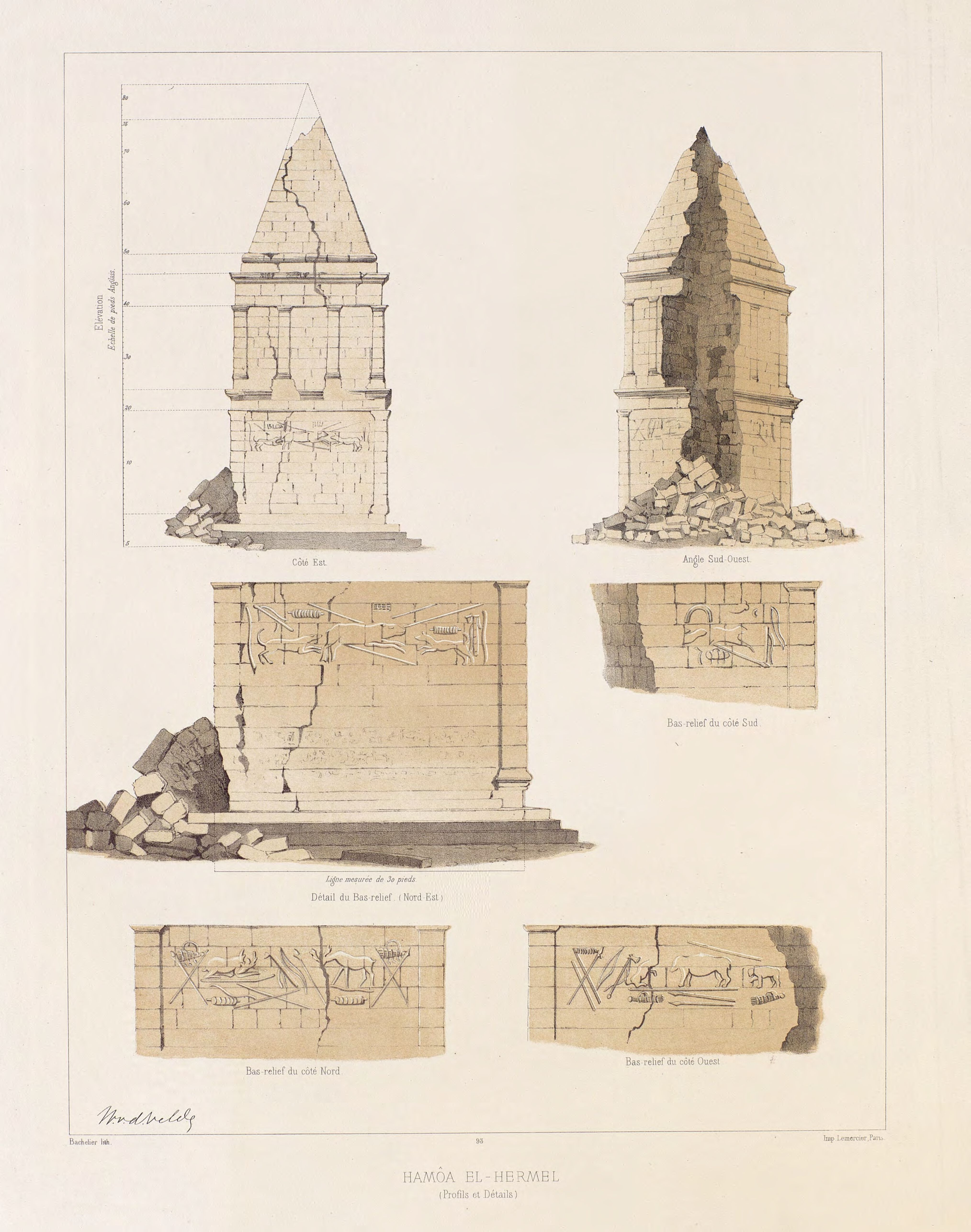
Kamouh el Hermel described in the early 1850s, by van de Velde

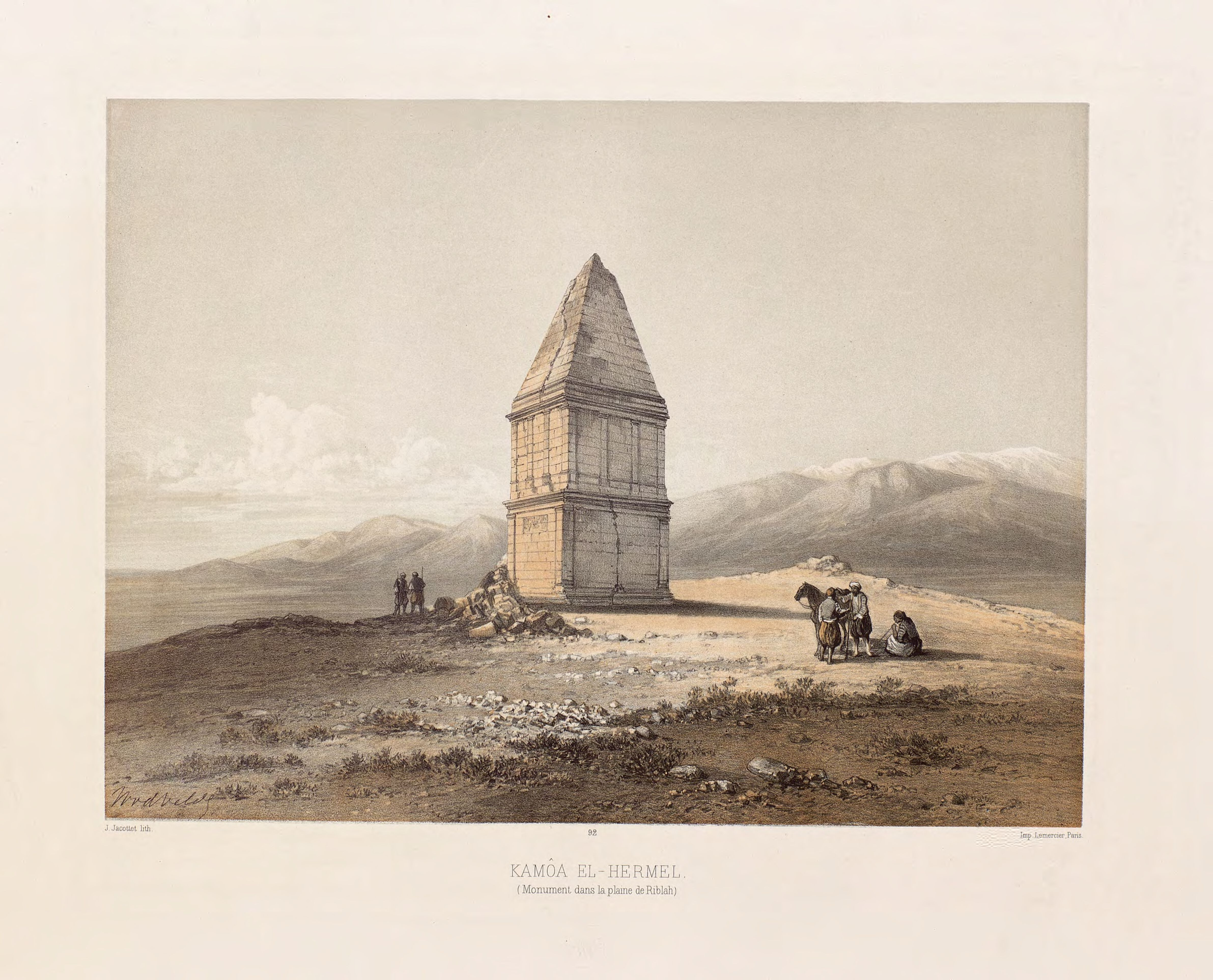
Kamouh el Hermel described in the early 1850s, by van de Velde

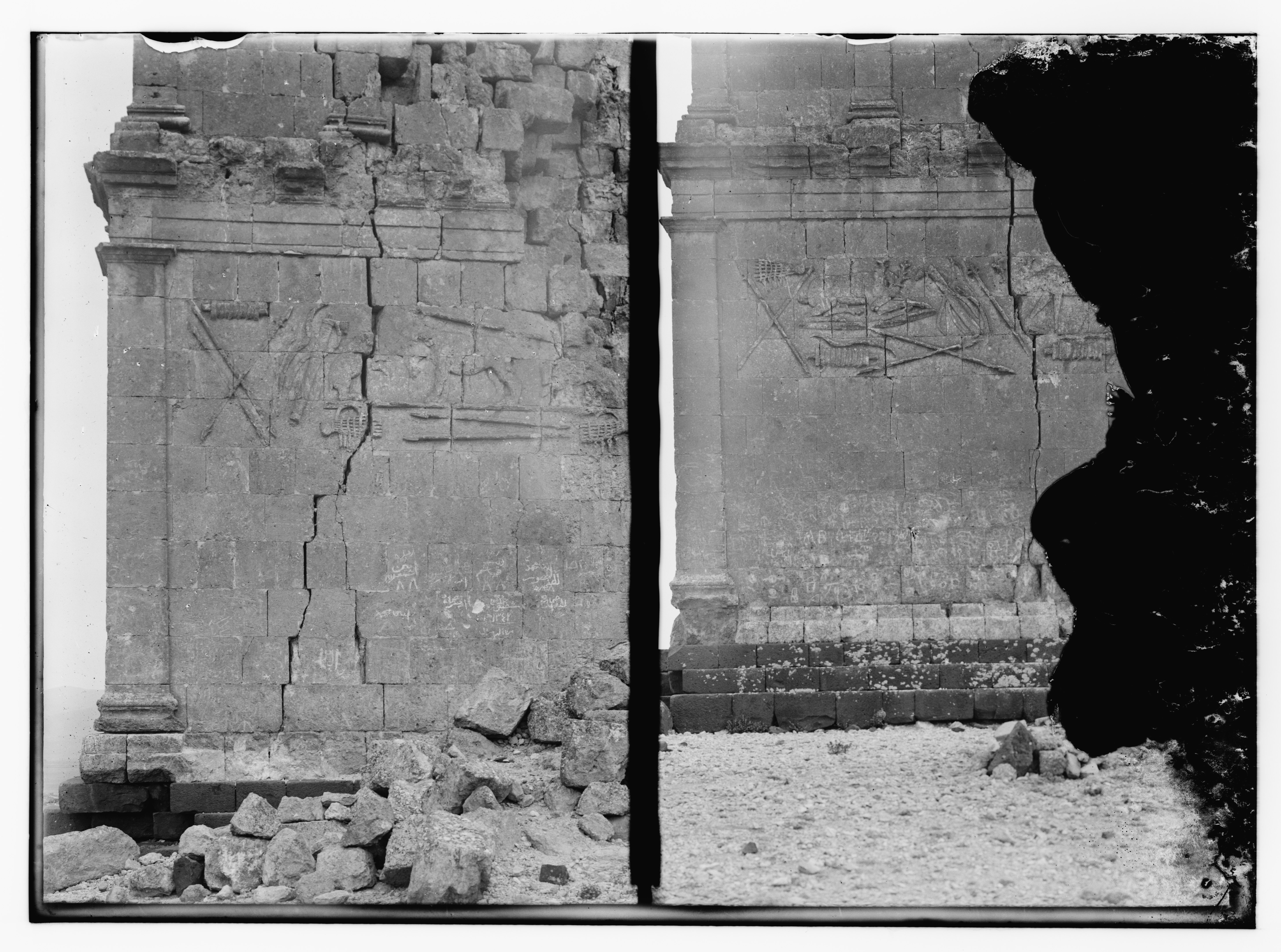
Kamouh el Hermel, between 1898 and 1946

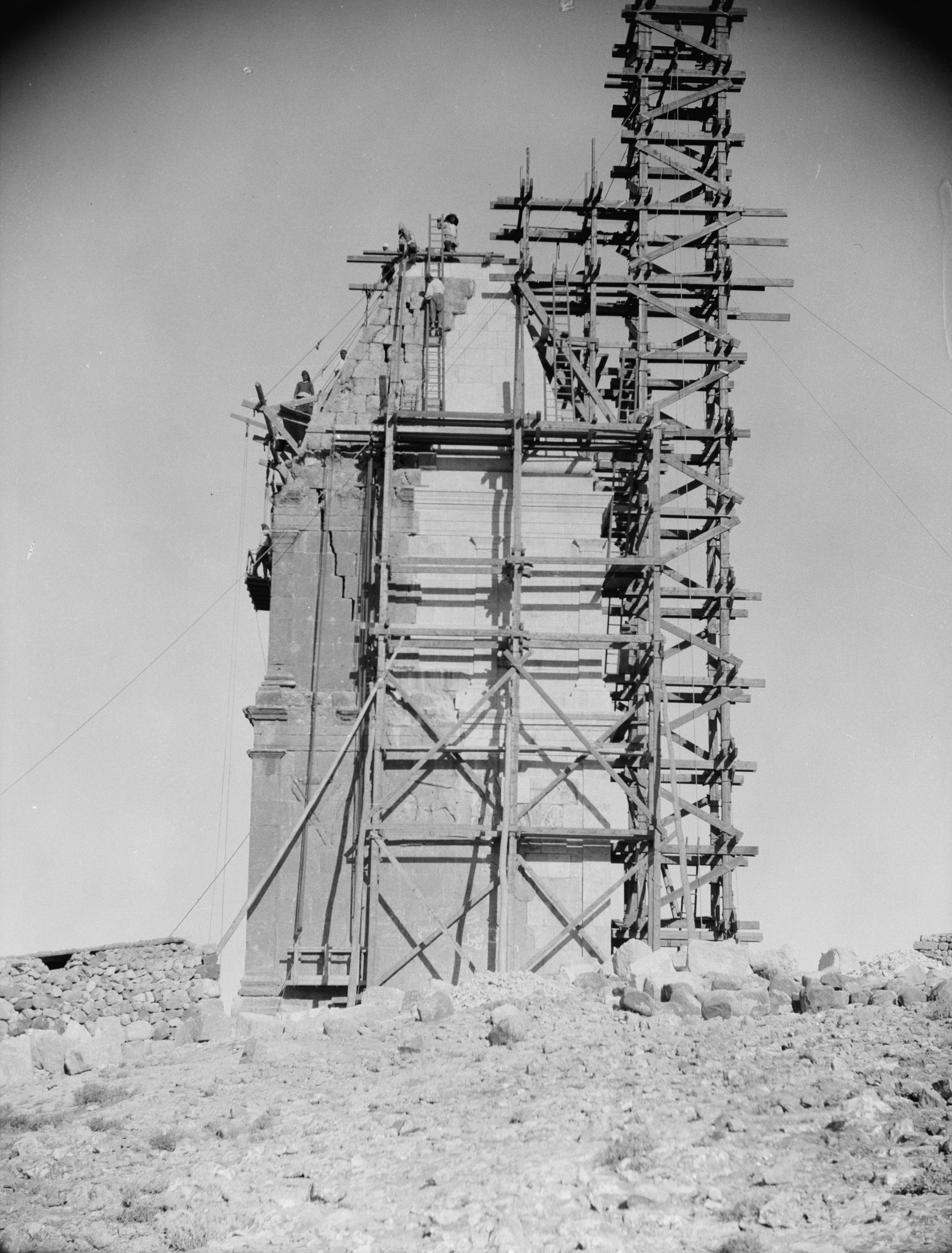
Kamuat el Hirmil showing restoration work in progress, 1920

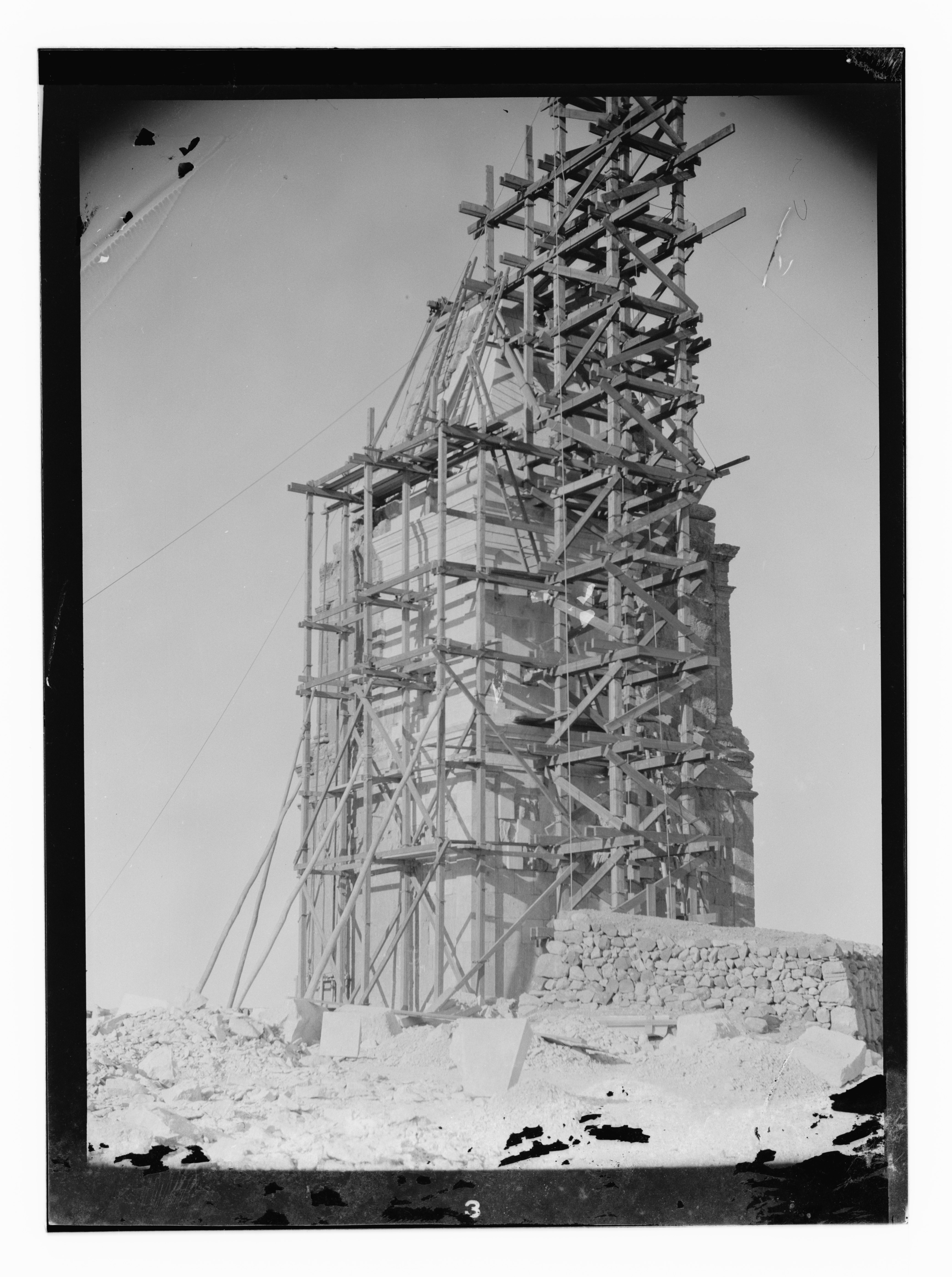
Kamuat el-Hirmel, 1925
