= Maqne =

Town in Baalbek-Hermel, Lebanon

Maqne مقنة Maakne
- Location in Lebanon
- Coordinates: 34°4′40″N 36°12′31″E
- Country: Lebanon
- Governorate: Baalbek-Hermel
- District: Baalbek
- Time zone: UTC+2 (EET)
  - Summer (DST): +3

Maqne I, Tell Maqne
- Maakne I, Tell Maakne
- Interactive map of Maqne I, Tell Maqne
- Type: Surface site & Tell
- Periods: Shepherd Neolithic, Early Bronze Age, Ancient Rome
- Location: Beqaa Valley, Lebanon
- Part of: Type site

Site notes
- Excavation dates: 1957
- Archaeologists: M. Billaux, Maurice Tallon, Henri Fleisch
- Condition: ruins,
- Public access: Yes

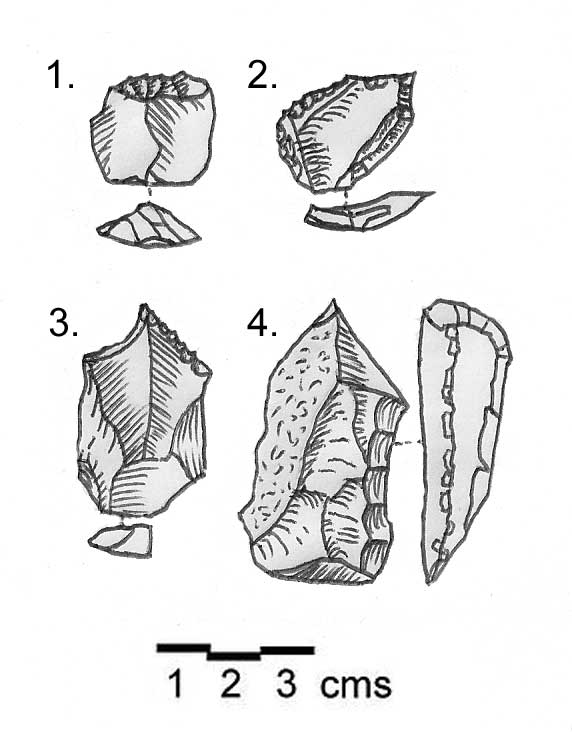
Shepherd Neolithic flint tools discovered at Kamouh el Hermel. 1. End scraper on a flake. 2. Transverse scraper and awl on a thin flake. 3. Borer on a flake blade. 4. Burin with a wide working edge on a heavy flake. All in matt brown flint.

Maqne or Maakne (Arabic: مقنة, romanized: Maqneh) is a town and municipality in Baalbek District, Baalbek-Hermel Governorate, Lebanon.

== Maqne I ==
Along with Qaa, Maqne I or Maakne I is a type site of the Shepherd Neolithic industry. The surface site was discovered in 1957 by M. Billaux and the materials found were studied by Henri Fleisch and Maurice Tallon. Findings were published by Fleisch in 1966. The site is located 1 kilometre (0.62 mi) south of the town, east of the road that leads from Baalbek to Homs. The Shepherd Neolithic assemblage found resembled that collected from Qaa and was spread over a sterile area of consolidated Neogene alluvial conglomerates. Lorraine Copeland commented that the industry could be found in no particular concentration around a wide area of the northern Beqaa Valley. M. Billaux observed that the worked Shepherd Neolithic flints were of far superior quality than the brittle, unworkable flint conglomerates in the area. He suggested that these flints were imported onto the Beqaa plains from elsewhere.

The Shepherd Neolithic industry can be defined firstly by being small and thick in size, with flakes commonly ranging from 2.5 centimetres (0.98 in) to 4 centimetres (1.6 in), the thickness distinguishing them from geometric microliths. Their second characteristic is the limited number of forms that the tools take, apart from cores being transverse racloirs on small flakes, strong-pointed borers, denticulated or notched thick, short blades and end-scrapers. It was thirdly characterized by a lack of known typology, with only occasional use of Levallois technique. It was determined to be definitely later than the Mesolithic but without any usual forms from the Upper Paleolithic or pottery Neolithic. Henri Fleisch tentatively suggested the industry to be Epipaleolithic and suggested it may have been used by nomadic shepherds. The Shepherd Neolithic has largely been ignored and understudied following the outbreak of the Lebanese civil war.

== Tell Maqne ==
Tell Maqne or Tell Maakne is located in a cemetery 200 metres (660 ft) east of the road between El Ain and Baalbek. It is a mound of grey soil on top of a cliff that overlooks a ravine of the north Nahle that can be accessed by a road to the east of the village. The tell was found by Lorraine Copeland in the August 1966, who collected a variety of cores, scrapers, blades and burins, all with a white patina. Various groups of pottery were found dispersed and broken up around the area. A collection of Early Bronze Age sherds was made that included chevrons and combed impressions resembling similar pieces found at Bchemoun. Another type of pottery found was a thin, yellow and brown washed type considered similar to the "Smeared Wash" type found by Robert John Braidwood at Amuq. Fragments of inverted-rim platters were also discovered with a reddish black burnish. Other sherds were found with a vibrant red or orange burnish that had small, round handles. Another group of pottery found was of a very rough type, made with chaff-holes and large, coarse grits. Other pottery found indicated Roman and later occupations.

Maurice Tallon did not consider that the tumuli to be found on the nearby plains was prehistoric.
