= 2016 Qaa bombings =

2016 Qaa attacks
- Part of the Syrian civil war spillover in Lebanon
- Location: Qaa, Lebanon
- Date: 27 June 2016
- Attack type: suicide bombing
- Weapons: Explosives and suicide vests
- Deaths: 5
- Injuries: 13–30
- Perpetrator: Islamic State (alleged but denied)

On 27 June 2016, eight suicide bombers carried out a series of explosions in the Lebanese Christian town of Qaa in Baalbeck-Hermel, near the Syrian border, killing 5 civilians and injuring around 30 others.

== Attack ==
=== Morning attacks ===
On a Monday morning, a perpetrator, riding a motorcycle, threw a grenade towards a gathering of worshipers in front of a church and then blew himself up with an explosive belt. This was followed by a second suicide bomber riding a bicycle who blew himself up as well. Two other perpetrators attacked the town but an army intelligence unit chased one of them forcing him to detonate his vest without injuring other pedestrians. The other suicide bomber tried to attack a military center, but he was also given chase by security forces according to a statement by the Lebanese Army Command.

=== Evening attacks ===
These bombings were succeeded by four suicide bombings at dawn in other parts of the town; 2 of which were near a church.

== Aftermath ==
The Qaa attacks got the attention of Lebanese security forces as they cracked down on illegal emigrants and wanted criminals. Security forces raided Syrian refugee camps the day after the attack and arrested 103 Syrians for not having legal documents and nine motorbikes were confiscated.

=== International reactions ===
- The Iraqi Ministry of Foreign Affairs condemned the suicidal terrorist operations that took place in the Lebanese town of Al-Qaa, and affirmed Iraq's support for the people and government of Lebanon.
- The United States condemned the terrorist bombings in the Lebanese town of Al-Qaa, and affirmed its support for the Lebanese Armed Forces in confronting terrorism.

== See Also ==
- List of extrajudicial killings and political violence in Lebanon
