= Qaa =

Qaa القاع (Arabic) El Qaa, Al Qaa
- Location in Lebanon
- Coordinates: 34°20′37″N 36°28′32″E
- Country: Lebanon
- Governorate: Baalbek-Hermel
- District: Baalbek

Government
  - Type: Municipality
  - Mayor: Bachir Matar

Area
  - Total: 4.98 sq mi (12.91 km^{2})
- Elevation: 2,156 ft (657 m)

Population (2010)
  - Total: 500
  - Density: 2,400/sq mi (930/km^{2})
- Time zone: UTC+2 (EET)
  - Summer (DST): +3

Qaa
- El Qaa
- Interactive map of Qaa
- Periods: Shepherd Neolithic
- Location: Beqaa Valley, Lebanon
- Part of: Type site

Site notes
- Archaeologists: M. Billaux, Henri Fleisch
- Condition: ruins
- Public access: Yes

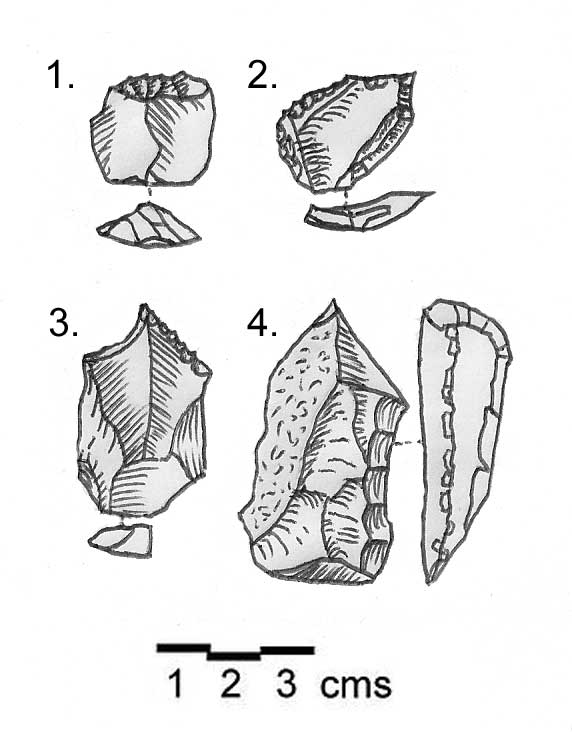
Shepherd Neolithic flint tools discovered at Kamouh el Hermel. 1. End scraper on a flake. 2. Transverse scraper and awl on a thin flake. 3. Borer on a flake blade. 4. Burin with a wide working edge on a heavy flake. All in matt brown flint.

Qaa (Arabic: القاع), El Qaa, Al Qaa, Qaa Baalbek or Masharih al-Qaa is a town in Baalbek-Hermel Governorate, Lebanon. A 2010 report stated that population of the settlement was 500, all Lebanese Maronite Christians.

== History ==
In 1838, Eli Smith noted Qaa's population as being predominantly Catholic Christian.

During the initial phase of the Lebanese Civil War, Qaa’s strategic location in the northern Beqaa made it a focal point for early sectarian friction. On June 29, 1975, the village was the site of a massacre in which seven Christian civilians were summarily executed by local Shi’a tribesmen and Palestinian militants from the Syrian-backed As-Sa'iqa faction. This event served as a definitive catalyst for the exodus of the Christian population from the northern Beqaa, marking the beginning of significant demographic displacement in the region.

In 1976, the village remained a site of instability as the conflict escalated into a regional struggle involving the Lebanese National Movement (LNM) and Palestinian factions. During this period, Qaa’s proximity to the Syrian border led to its involvement in the shifting front lines of the Syrian military intervention, which officially commenced with troops crossing the Qaa border axis in June 1976. This presence further entrenched militia control over the area—most notably through the blockade of the Northern Beqaa road following the Labweh bus massacre—preventing the return of displaced residents and solidifying the region's demographic shift. These events laid the groundwork for the deeper sectarian animosities that would culminate in the subsequent massacres in the same region in June 1978.

On 28 June 1978, unidentified militiamen killed 26 villagers from Qaa and three other villages. The murders were believed to be connected to the killing of 34 people, including Tony Franjieh, on 13 June. The gunmen were reported to have had lists of names from which they selected their victims.

The Syrian army invaded Lebanon at 4 a.m. on 1 September 2012 and kidnapped a farmer from the town as part of escalating incursions during the Syrian civil war. The invasion lasted for 40 minutes before the unit withdrew. A house in Qaa had previously been hit by a shell fired by the Syrian army.

On the 27 June 2016, at least five people in Qaa were killed and 13 others wounded in an attack by four suicide bombers during the Syrian Civil war spillover into Lebanon.

== Archaeology ==
Along with Maqne I, Qaa is a type site of the Shepherd Neolithic industry. The site is located 5 miles (8 km) north west of the town, north of a path leading from Qaa to Hermel. It was discovered by M. Billaux and the materials recovered were documented by Henri Fleisch in 1966. The area was lightly cultivated with a thin soil covering the conglomerates. The flints were divided into three groups of a reddish brown, light brown and one that was mostly chocolate and grey colored with a radiant "desert shine".

The Shepherd Neolithic industry can be defined firstly by being small and thick in size, with flakes commonly ranging from 2.5 to 4 centimetres (0.98 to 1.57 in), the thickness distinguishing them from geometric microliths. Their second characteristic is the limited number of forms that the tools take, apart from cores being transverse racloirs on small flakes, strong-pointed borers, denticulated or notched thick, short blades and end-scrapers. It was thirdly characterized by a lack of known typology, with only occasional use of Levallois technique. It was determined to be definitely later than the Mesolithic but without any usual forms from the Upper Paleolithic or pottery Neolithic. Henri Fleisch tentatively suggested the industry to be Epipaleolithic and suggested it may have been used by nomadic shepherds. The Shepherd Neolithic has largely been ignored and understudied following the outbreak of the Lebanese civil war.

== Statue of Christ ==
In March 2026, a twenty-six meter statue of Christ was erected in Qaa on Jabal al-Salib (ِArabic for "Mount of the Cross"). The statue overlooks the Beqaa Valley and is located near the Syrian border. It was designed by Lebanese architect George Makhlouf. It is made of fiberglass, and consists of a sixteen meter statue mounted on a ten meter base. The project was initiated by Fady Awad, who lives in Qaa, and supported by the local municipality, and was completed after approximately one year.

== See also ==
- Qaa massacre
- Al-Qaa airstrike
- 2016 Qaa bombings
- List of extrajudicial killings and political violence in Lebanon

== Bibliography ==
- Robinson, E.; Smith, E. (1841). Biblical Researches in Palestine, Mount Sinai and Arabia Petraea: A Journal of Travels in the year 1838. Vol. 3. Boston: Crocker & Brewster.
