= Shepherd Neolithic =

Style of ancient industry in Lebanon

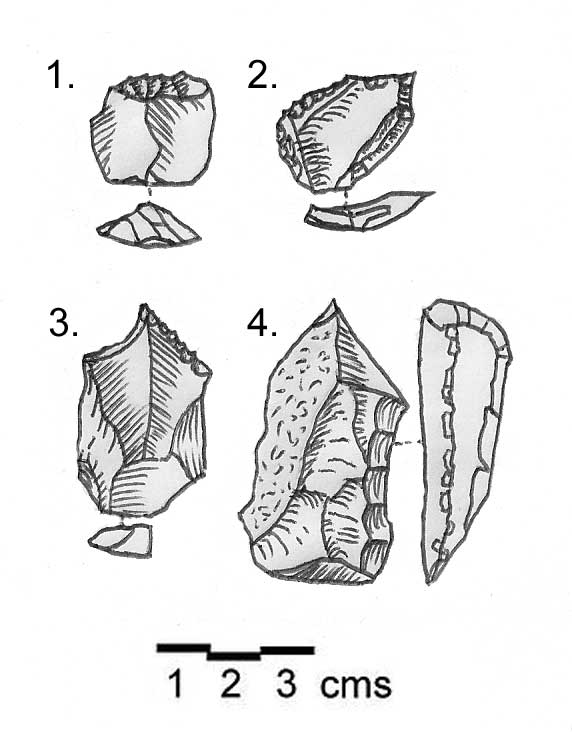
- Geographical range: Lebanon
- Period: Epipaleolithic
- Dates: circa 10,200 B.C.E. — circa 8,800 B.C.E.
- Type site: Qaa, Maqne
- Major sites: Hermel, Kamouh el Hermel, Douris, Hermel, Kamouh el Hermel, Qalaat Tannour, Rayak North, Riha Station
- Preceded by: Natufian culture
- Followed by: Pre-Pottery Neolithic A

Shepherd Neolithic is a name given by archaeologists to a style (or industry) of small flint tools from the Hermel plains in the north Beqaa Valley, Lebanon.

Map of Lebanon showing important sites that were occupied in the Shepherd Neolithic (clickable map)

The Shepherd Neolithic industry has been insufficiently studied and was provisionally named based on a limited typology collected by Jesuit archaeologist "Père" Henri Fleisch. Lorraine Copeland and Peter J. Wescombe suggested it was possibly "of quite late date".

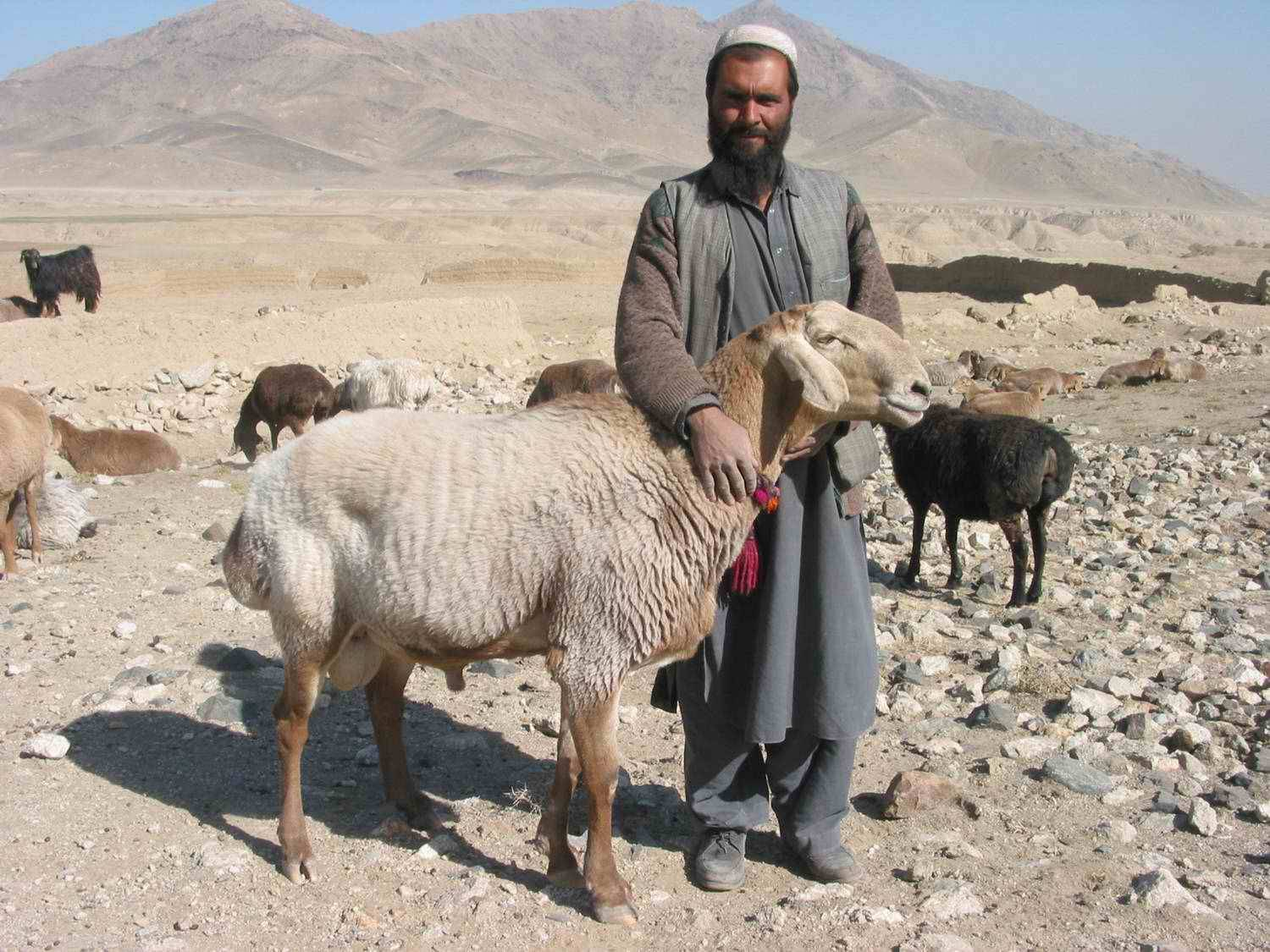
A shepherd with sheep on a mountainside. Sheep were among the first animals to be domesticated by humankind; the domestication date is estimated to fall between nine and eleven thousand years ago in Mesopotamia.Henri Fleisch suggested that the Shepherd Neolithic industry could have been used by nomadic shepherds.

== Characteristics ==
Shepherd Neolithic material can be found dispersed over a wide area of the north Beqaa Valley in low concentrations. M. Billaux and Henri Fleisch suggested that the flints were of a higher quality than the brittle flint in the nearby conglomerates indicating origin from elsewhere. Three groups of flint could be determined; light brown, red-brown and that varied but was usually grey-chocolate that was distinguished with a radiant "desert shine". Characteristics of the industry include smallness in size, commonly between 2.5 cm and 4 cm and frequently being quite thick, unlike geometric microliths. The small number of tools within the assemblage is another distinguishable characteristic, including short denticulated or notched blades, end scrapers, transverse racloirs on thin flakes and borers with strong points. They also display a lack of recognizable typology although Levallois technique was occasionally observed to have been used. They also show signs of having been heavily worked with cores being re-used and turned into scrapers. Fleisch suggested the industry was Epipaleolithic as it is evidently not Paleolithic, Mesolithic or even Pottery Neolithic. He further suggested that the industry could have been used by nomadic shepherds.

The relationship and dividing line between the related Heavy Neolithic zone of the south Beqaa Valley could also not be clearly defined but was suggested to be in the area around Douris and Qalaat Tannour. Not enough exploration had been carried out to conclude whether the bands of Neolithic surface sites continues south into the areas around Zahle and Rayak.

== Sites ==
The type sites of the Shepherd Neolithic are at Qaa and Maqne I, with other sites with Shepherd Neolithic finds include Douris, Hermel II, Hermel III, Kamouh el Hermel, Qalaat Tannour, Wadi Boura I and possibly at Rayak North, Riha Station and Serain.
