= Tomb of Hamrath =

Hellenistic mausoleum

The Tomb of Hamrath was a late Hellenistic mausoleum that formerly stood in As-Suwayda, a city in the Hauran area, in modern-day Syria. From its inscription, it is known that the mausoleum was dedicated to a woman named Hamrath, and the style of lettering allows for its dating to the 1st century BC. The monument featured a design recalling classical Greek architecture with Hellenistic influence, including a stepped pyramid.

== Documentation ==
Travelers in the 19th century documented the Tomb of Hamrath as a sizable and fairly well-preserved funerary monument situated atop a hill with views overlooking a ravine. By the 1860s, the structure was nearly complete in illustrations by De Vogüé. Yet, by 1909, Brünnow & Domaszewski's photographs showed it had deteriorated to roughly half its previous state.

== Hamrath ==
The mausoleum's connection to Hamrath is established through a bilingual inscription in Greek and Aramaic, which reads: "Tomb of Hamrath, which was erected for her by Odainath her husband." An epigraphic analysis of this inscription suggests that the monument dates back to the first century BC.

== Architecture ==
The mausoleum, characterized by its quadrangular form, was erected upon a slightly elevated platform with dimensions approximately 11 meters along each side in tis base. It featured a large podium above the base, adorned with six Doric columns along each side, including smaller columns at the corners. These columns,4.61 high and with a base diameter of 0.89 meters, exhibited a slight inward tilt, a technique reminiscent of classical Greek architecture.

The upper parts of the spaces between columns are decorated with relief carvings of arms and armor, an unusual choice for a female's tomb. The entablature, adhering to late Hellenistic architectural styles, lack certain traditional elements due to the difficulty of carving hard basalt.

A stepped pyramid, part of the structure's design, suggests Eastern influences, though such features were known in the Aegean and Asia Minor since ancient times. This decoration style, particularly the armament carvings, was common in Macedonian buildings and became widespread in the Mediterranean during the Hellenistic period.

Although the substructure was not extensively investigated, it is possible that the burial site itself was located beneath, similar to other tombs in Amrit, which were situated below ground level.

Few similar structures exist in the Near and Middle East, with the monuments at Hermel and Qalaat Faqra also reflecting strong Hellenistic characteristics. Yet, they serve different architectural and functional purposes. The monument's pyramid-shaped top and the presence of shields and other military items among its decorations prompted scholars to compare it to the yet-undiscovered Tomb of the Maccabees, as described in 1 Maccabees.

== See also ==
- Tomb of Sampisgeramus, another destroyed mausoleum in Syria
- Kamouh el Hermel, a pyramidal Hellenistic mausoleum in Lebanon
- Tomb of the Maccabees, a comparable, long-lost pyramidal funerary complex in Israel
- Horvat Midras, an archaeological site with the remains of a pyramidal tomb in Israel
