= Riha Station =

Archaeological site in Lebanon

- Location within Lebanon
- 34.125833°N 36.211667°E
- Type: settlement
- Periods: Shepherd Neolithic
- Location: 14 kilometres (8.7 mi) northwest of Baalbek, Lebanon

Site notes
- Excavation dates: 1966
- Archaeologists: Frank Skeels, Laure Skeels
- Public access: Yes

Riha Station is a hill with a thin, occupational Shepherd Neolithic archaeological site located between the villages of Chaat and Knaisse, 14 kilometres (8.7 mi) northwest of Baalbek in Lebanon.

The site was found by Frank Skeels and Laure Skeels in 1966, who collected some work flints that were passed to the Saint Joseph University, Museum of Lebanese Prehistory. The finds included small cores and flakes that were suggested to match Shepherd Neolithic typology.
