= Ali Hussain Sibat =

Former host of Lebanese call-in television show

Ali Hussain Sibat is a Lebanese national and former host of the popular call-in show that aired on satellite TV across the Middle East. On the show - described as "a Middle Eastern psychic hot line" by one source - he made predictions and gave advice to the audience.

In May 2008, he was arrested in Saudi Arabia on charges of "sorcery" while traveling to perform the Umrah pilgrimage. Sibat was sentenced to death by beheading. Following pressure on the Saudi government by the Lebanese government and human rights groups, he was released by the Saudi Supreme Court.

== Family and career ==
Ali Hussain Sibat, a Shia Muslim, is the father of four (other reports say five) children. Prior to his arrest, he lived with his family in the eastern Lebanese village al-Ain. His wife, Samira Rahmoon, is a Sunni Muslim.

From Beirut, Sibat hosted a popular call-in show, The Hidden, that aired across the Middle East on the satellite TV channel Sheherazade. On the show Sibat earned US$700 a month predicting the future, giving advice to his audience, casting spells and reciting incantations.

== Case of sorcery ==
=== Arrest and court proceedings ===
In May 2008, Sibat visited Saudi Arabia to perform the Umra pilgrimage to the holy shrines of Saudi Arabia. While Sibat was in the city of Medina, members of the Saudi religious police, the Mutawa'een, recognized him from his television show and then arrested him in his hotel room.

According to The New York Times, Sibat was lured into an "undercover sting operation" while in Medina. He was arrested shortly after the religious police recorded conversations he had with a woman about providing a magical elixir that would force her husband to separate from his second wife. According to his Lebanese lawyer, May el-Khansa, Sibat confessed only because he was assured that if he did so he would be released.

On 9 November 2009, a court in Medina sentenced Sibat to death on charges of "sorcery" after secret court hearings where he had no legal counsel. The crime of sorcery is not defined in Saudi laws, leading it to be applied in arbitrary ways. Also in 2009, Saudi authorities had arrested dozens of others on such charges.

In January 2010, the Court of Appeal in Makkah accepted an appeal against Sibat's death sentence, on the grounds that it was a premature verdict. On 10 March 2010, a court in Medina upheld the death sentence. According to Amnesty International: "The judges said that he deserved to be sentenced to death because he had practised 'sorcery' publicly for several years before millions of viewers and that his actions 'made him an infidel'." The case was then sent back to the Court of Appeal in Makkah for approval of the death sentence.

=== Scheduled execution ===
On Wednesday, March 31, 2010, Sibat's lawyer, May al-Khansa, informed the media that Sibat was to be executed that upcoming Friday April 2 following afternoon prayers. Sibat's case, particularly as his scheduled execution neared, elicited widespread media coverage, appeals by international human rights groups and intervention by several Lebanese government officials.

On Friday though, the execution did not occur. Al-Khansa stated that Lebanon's justice minister told Sibat the execution would not occur that day, though it was still not clear whether the beheading had been waived or only postponed.

=== Reactions ===
A Boston Globe editorial called Sibat's case "a 21st-century witch trial" and "a travesty of justice."

In September 2010, Amnesty International called on King Abdullah of Saudi Arabia to unconditionally release Sibat and commute his death sentence. If Sibat's death sentence was upheld after his appeal, the decision will be referred to the King for final ratification.

An unnamed Lebanese legal expert talking to a Los Angeles Times reporter speculated that a political clash between Saudi conservatives and the Saudi king was involved in the arrest. "I don't know on what grounds they arrested him, since he didn't commit [the crime] in Saudi, he's not a Saudi citizen, and it wasn't directed against Saudi, and usually one of these criteria must be fulfilled."

=== Overturning of conviction ===
On November 11, 2010, the Saudi Supreme Court said that the death sentence was not warranted because he had not harmed anyone and had no prior offences in the country, according to Okaz, an Arabic Saudi Arabian daily newspaper located in Jeddah quoted by yalibnan.com. The court said his case should be sent back to a lower court in Medina to be retried and "recommended that Sibat, who has spent 30 months in Saudi prison since his May 2008 arrest, be deported". However as late as October 2011, government officials were reported as saying that Sibat had not been granted a reprieve, though his execution had been delayed. As of March 2012, Sibat was reported to have been released and allowed to return to Lebanon, though "this cannot be independently confirmed", according to Christoph Wilcke (Senior Researcher for the Middle East and North Africa Division at Human Rights Watch).
