= Baalbek-Hermel Governorate =

Governorate of Lebanon

Baalbek-Hermel Arabic: بعلبك - الهرمل
- Governorate
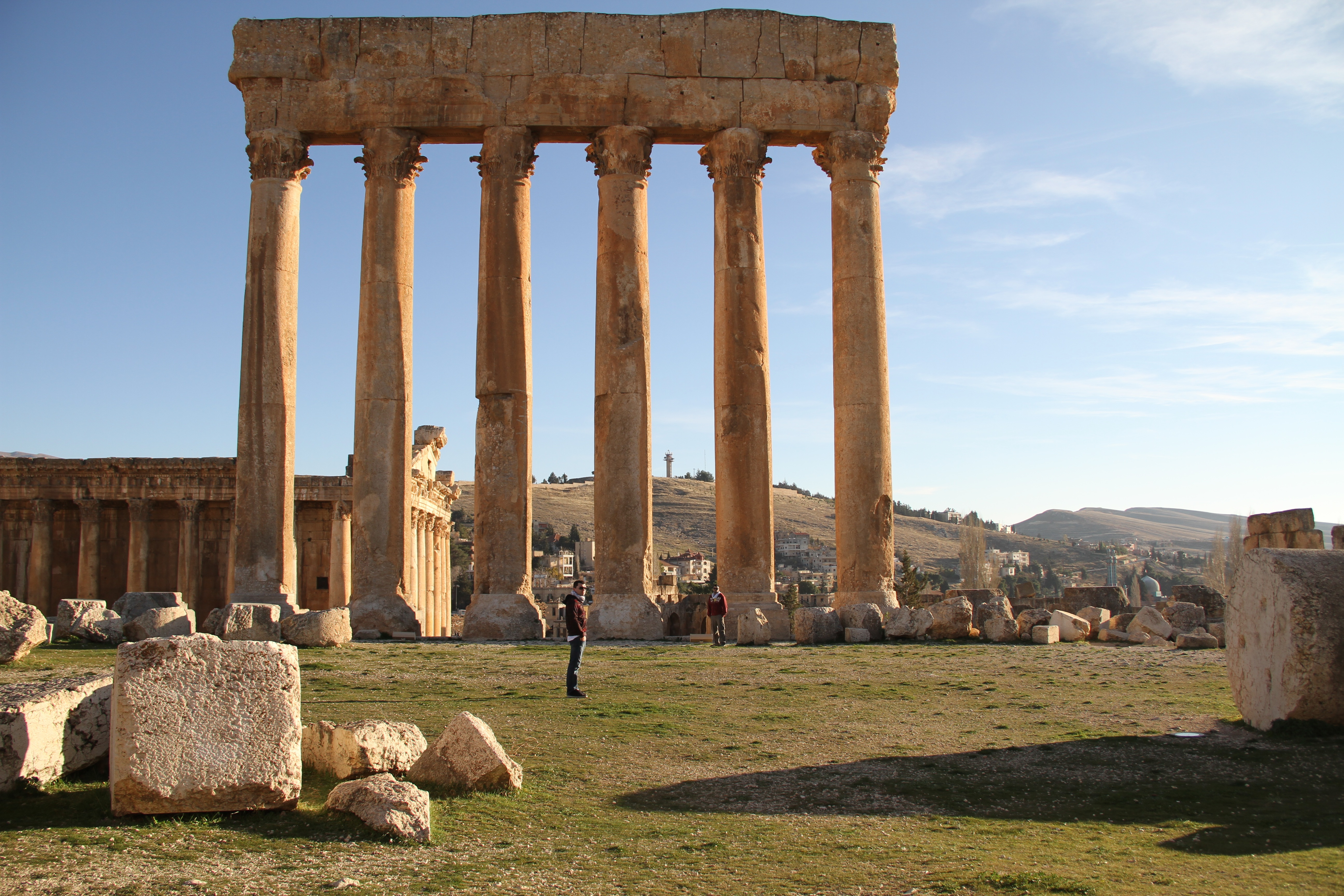
- Baalbek

- Location of Baalbek-Hermel Governorate in Lebanon
- Coordinates: 34.2°N 36.3°E
- Country: Lebanon
- Gazetted: 16 July 2003
- Capital: Baalbek

Government
  - Governor: Bashir Khodr (Independent)

Area
  - Total: 3,009 km^{2} (1,162 sq mi)

Population (31 December 2017)
  - Total: 457,932
  - Density: 152.2/km^{2} (394.2/sq mi)
- Time zone: UTC+2 (EET)
  - Summer (DST): UTC+3 (EEST)

Baalbek-Hermel (Arabic: بعلبك - الهرمل) is a governorate of Lebanon and is the largest by area in the country. It comprises the districts of Baalbek and Hermel, which in turn are subdivided into a total of 74 municipalities. The capital is at Baalbek. The governorate covers an area of 3,009 km^{2} (1,162 sq mi) and is bounded by Akkar Governorate to the northwest, North Governorate to the west, Keserwan-Jbeil Governorate and Mount Lebanon Governorate to the southwest, Beqaa Governorate to the south, and the Syrian governorates of Homs and Rif Dimashq to the northeast and southeast. The governorate occupies the northern portion of the Beqaa Valley, Lebanon's most important agricultural area.

The UNHCR estimated the population of the governorate at 416,427 in 2015, including 137,788 registered refugees of the Syrian Civil War and 8,117 Palestinian refugees. The Lebanese citizen population is predominantly Shiite with pockets of Christians and Sunnis, while the refugee population is predominantly Sunni Muslims.

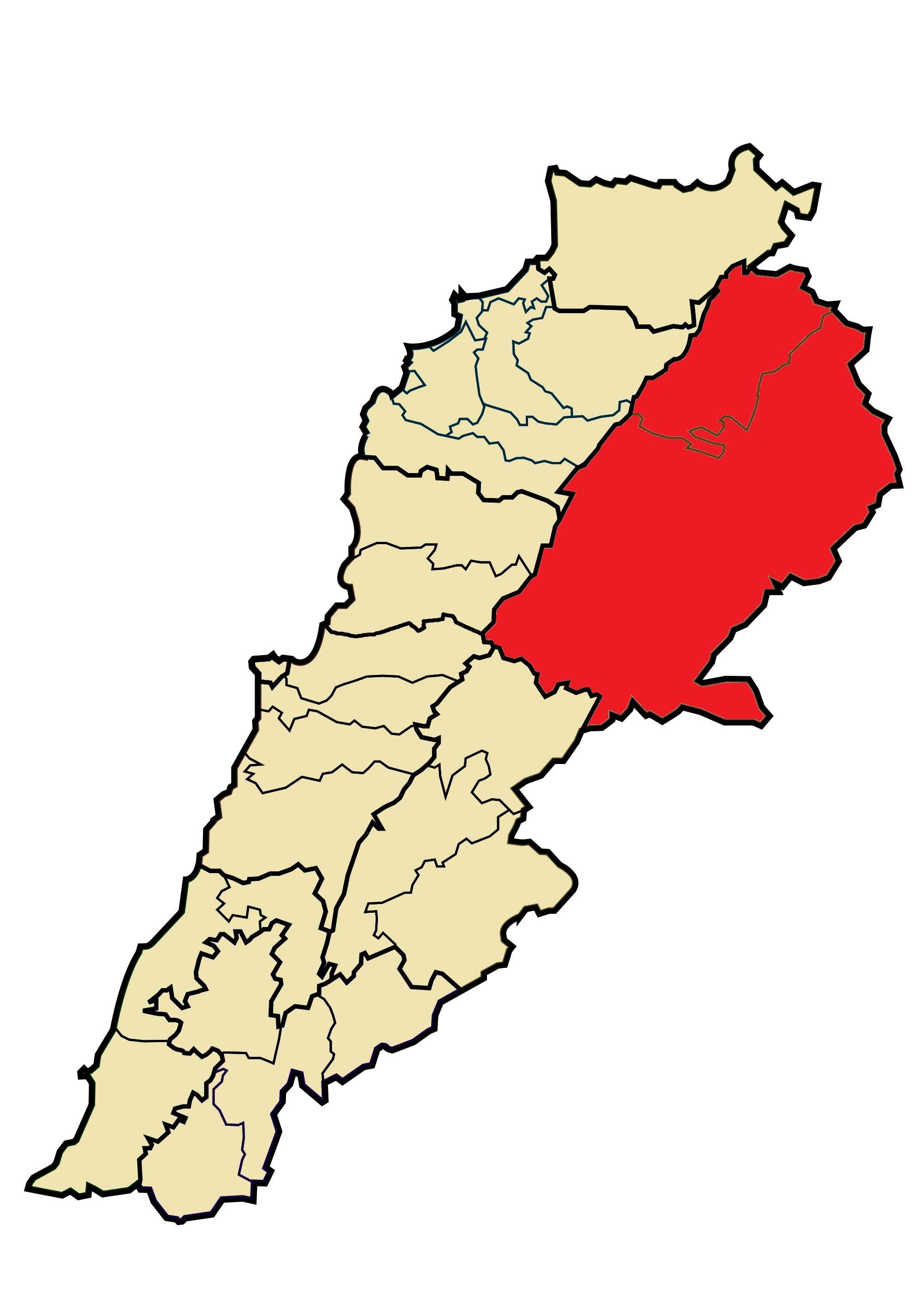
Baalbek-Hermel Governorate comprises Baalbek District and Hermel District

Baalbek-Hermel Governorate was created by the enactment of Law 522 on 16 July 2003, in which the districts of Baalbek and Hermel were separated from Beqaa Governorate. Implementation of the new region only began in 2014 with the appointment of the first and current governor, Bashir Khodr.

Already one of Lebanon's poorest regions, the recent influx of Syrian refugees has placed additional strain on the governorate's fragile infrastructure and services. Violence in Syria has spilled over into the governorate, especially in the area around Arsal and Ras Baalbek. The northern Beqaa valley and Baalbek have had Hezbollah or the Amal Movement electoral victories but 46% of the electorate voted for the opposition Baalbek Madinati party in recent elections.

== Demographics ==
According to registered voters in 2014:

Year	Christians					Muslims				Druze
Year	Total	Maronites	Greek Catholics	Greek Orthodox	Other Christians	Total	Shias	Sunnis	Alawites	Druze
2014	13.82%	7.53%	5.14%	0.91%	0.24%	85.79%	71.69%	14.06%	0.04%	0.01%
2022	15.75%	8.32%	5.58%	1.49%	0.36%	84.26%	69.69%	14.54%	0.03%	0.00%
2026	12.28%	6.78%	4.77%	0.65%	0.08%	87.72%	73.81%	13.81%	0.00%	0.00%

Religion in the Baalbek-Hermel Governorate
1. Shia Islam (69.7%)
2. Sunni Islam (14.5%)
3. Christianity (15.8%)
4. Other (0.00%)
Religion in the Baalbek-Hermel Governorate including the Beqaa Governorate
1. Shia Islam (43.0%)
2. Sunni Islam (25.5%)
3. Christianity (27.8%)
4. Druze (3.45%)
5. Other (0.37%)

== Gallery ==
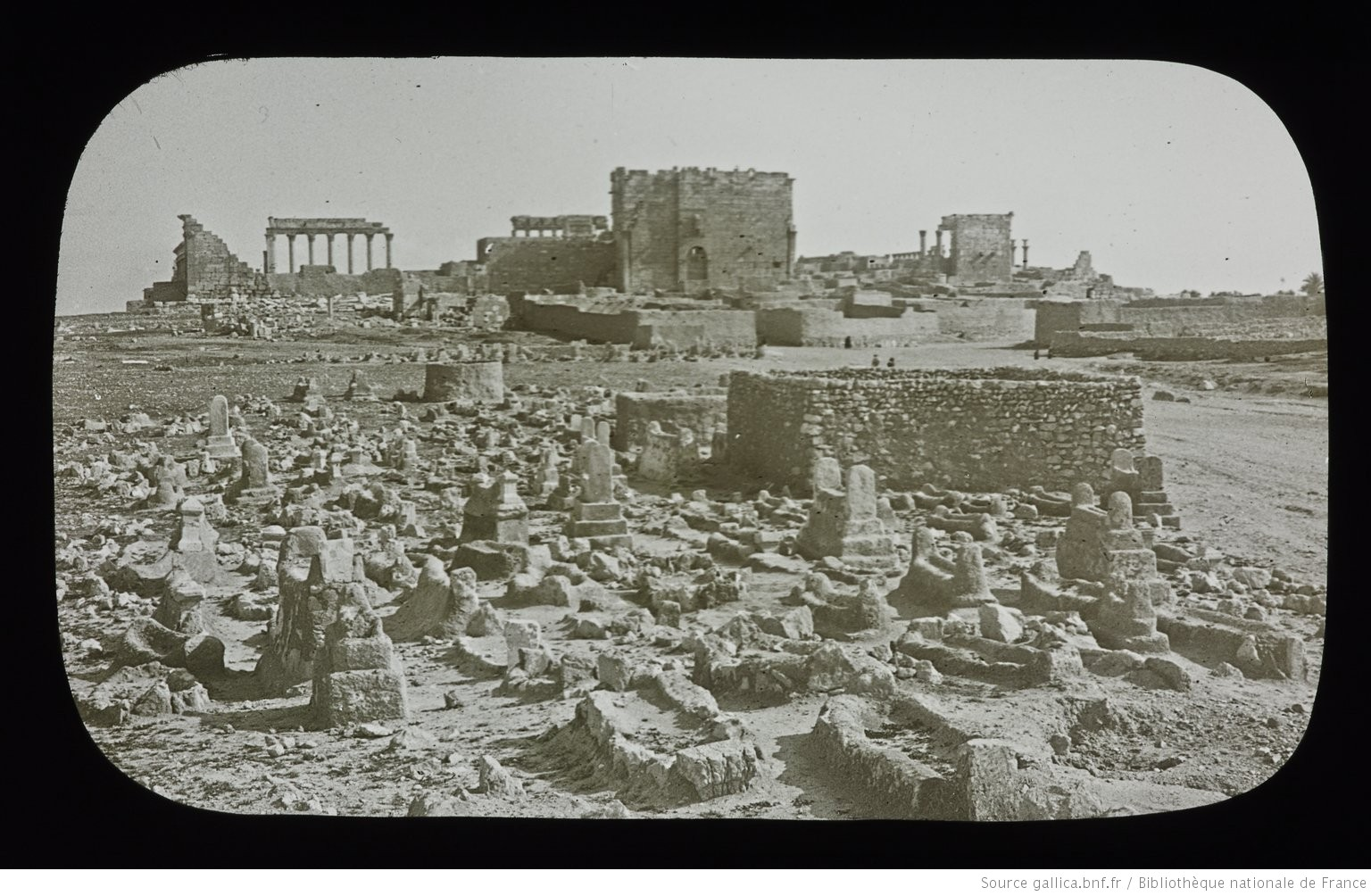

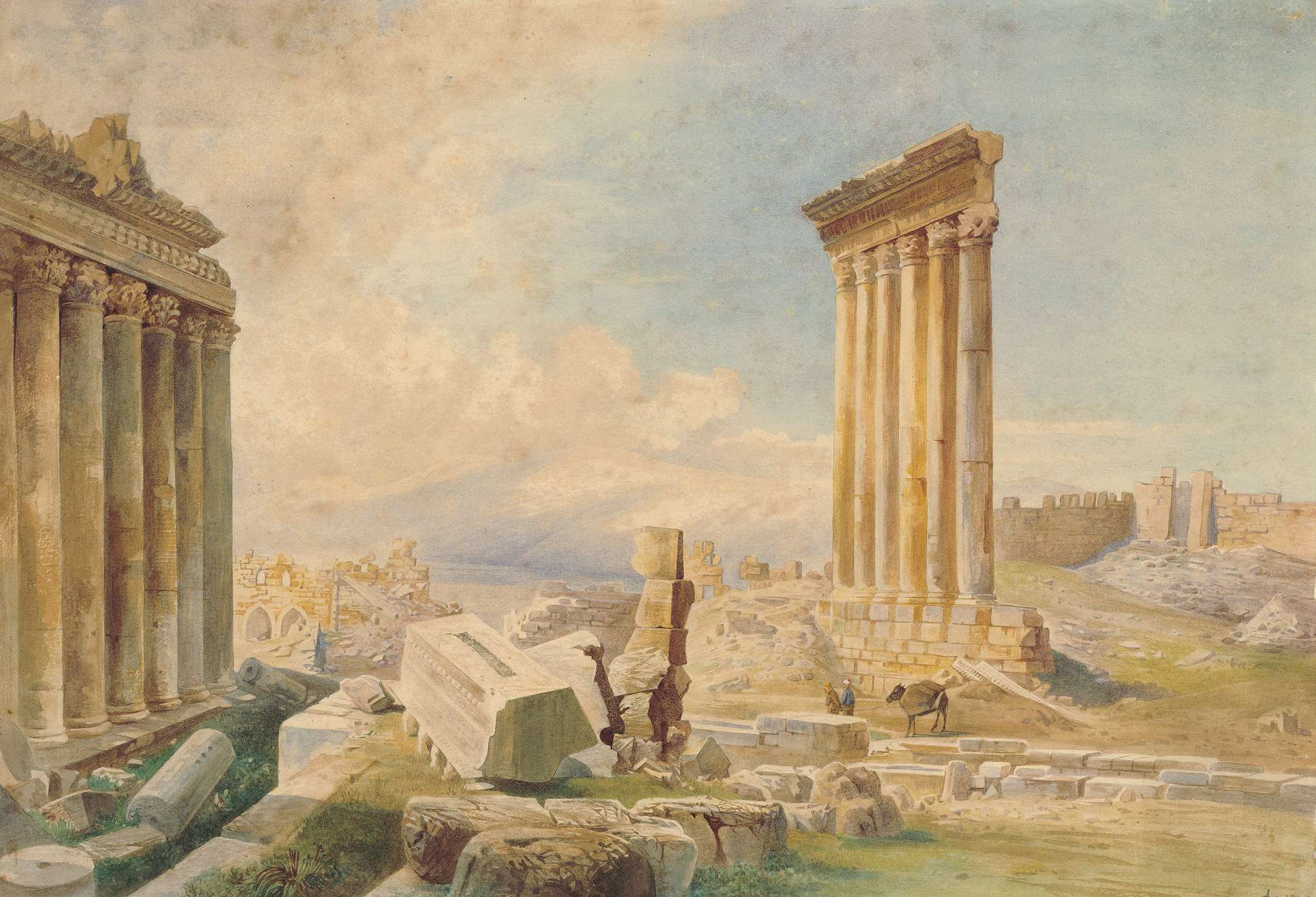

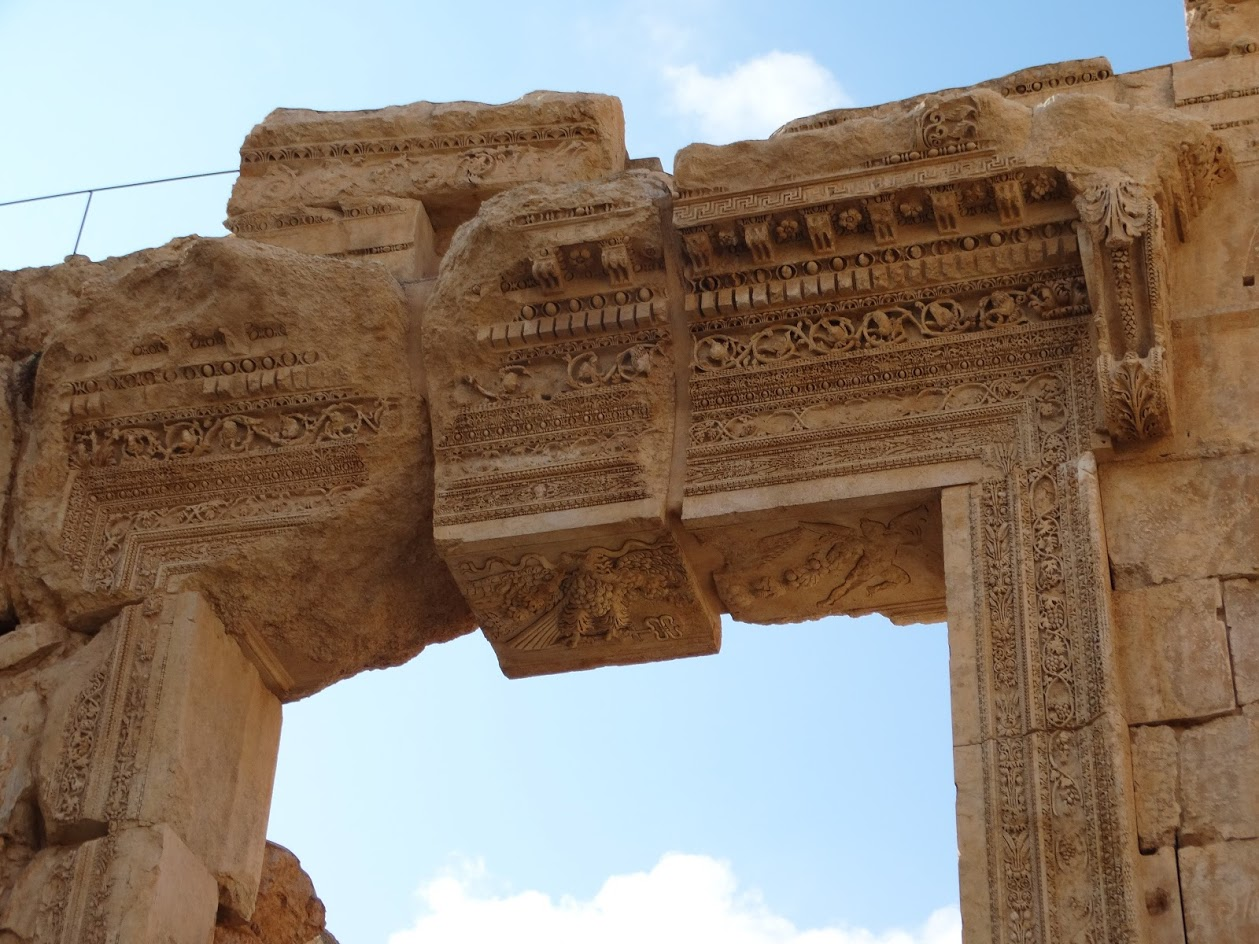

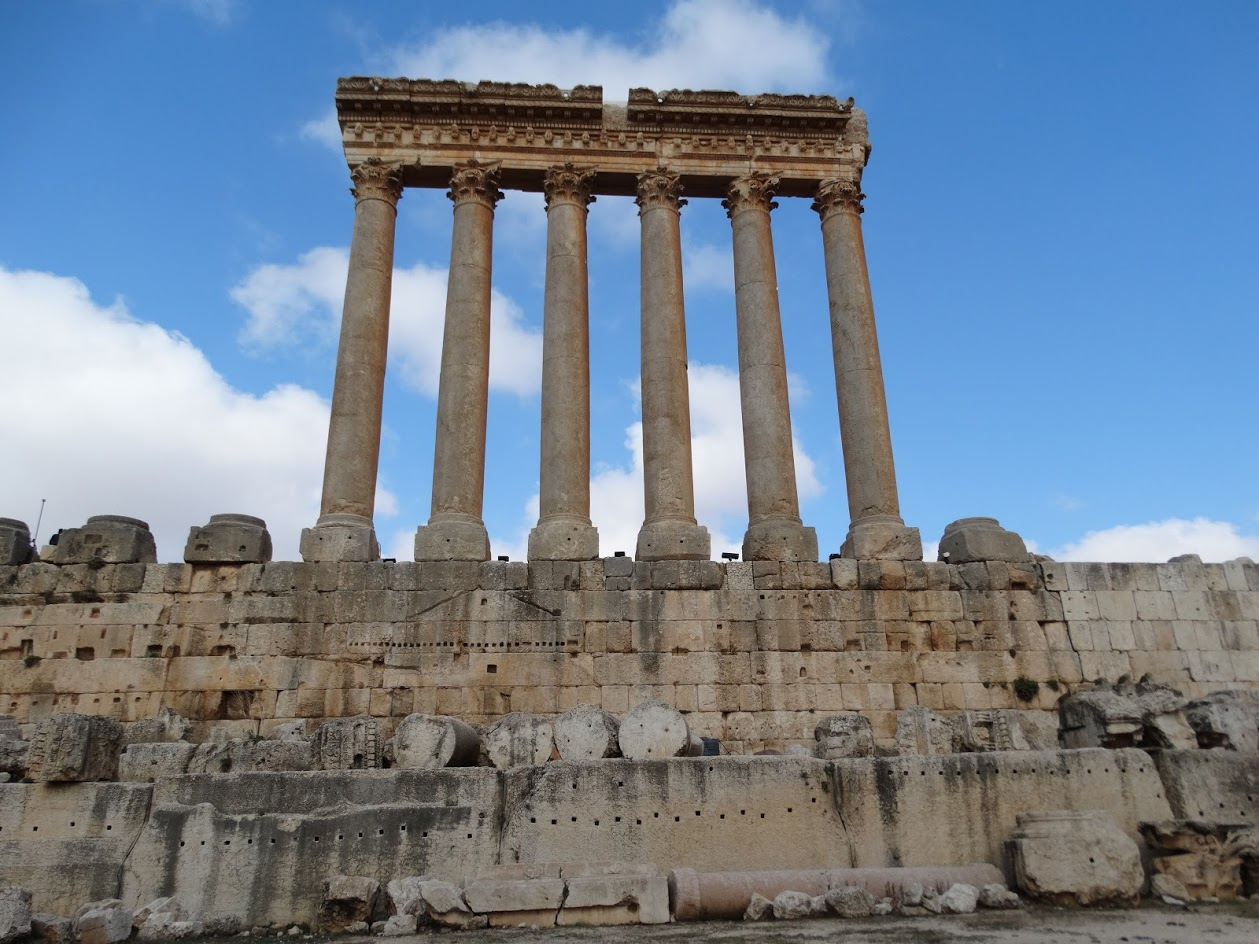

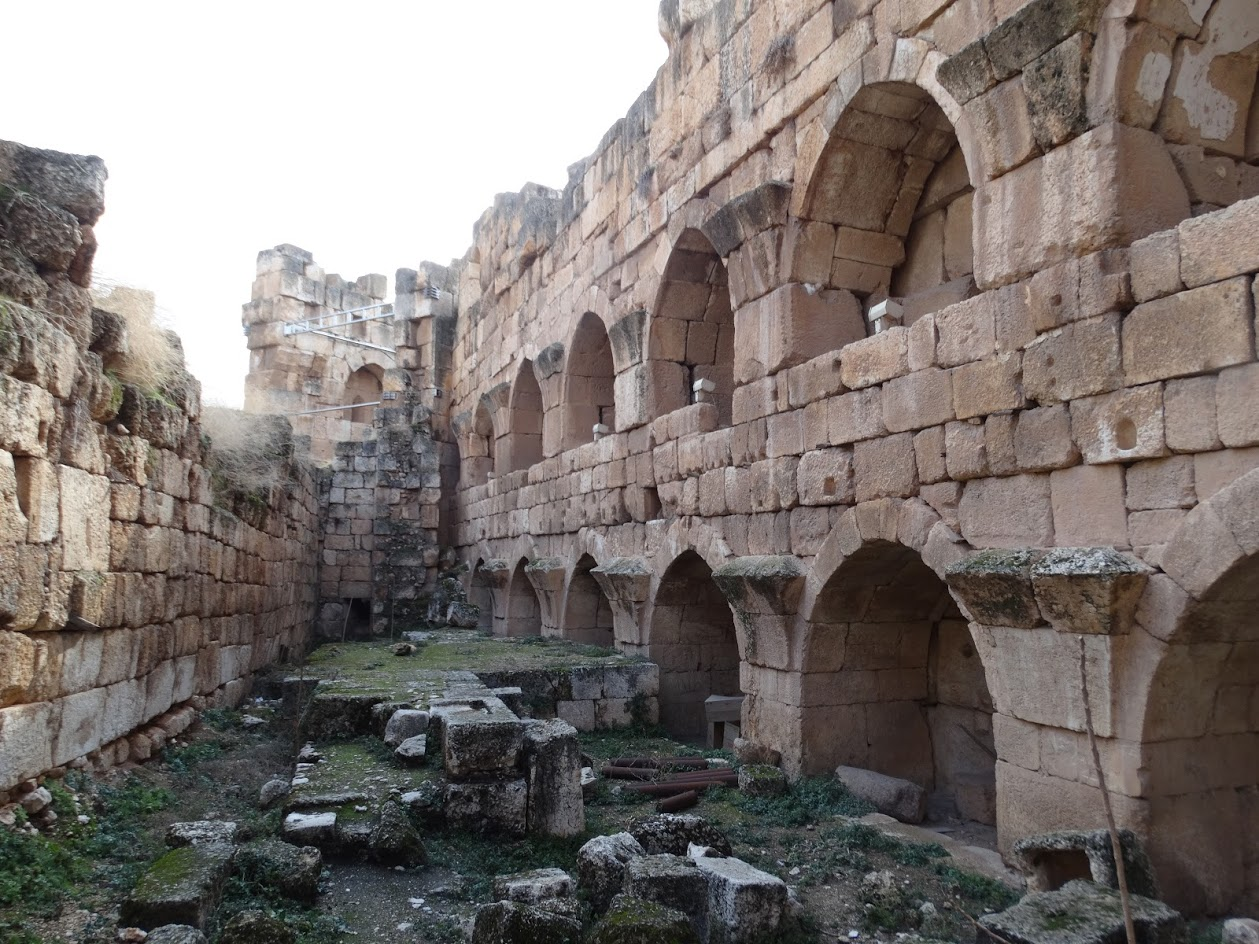

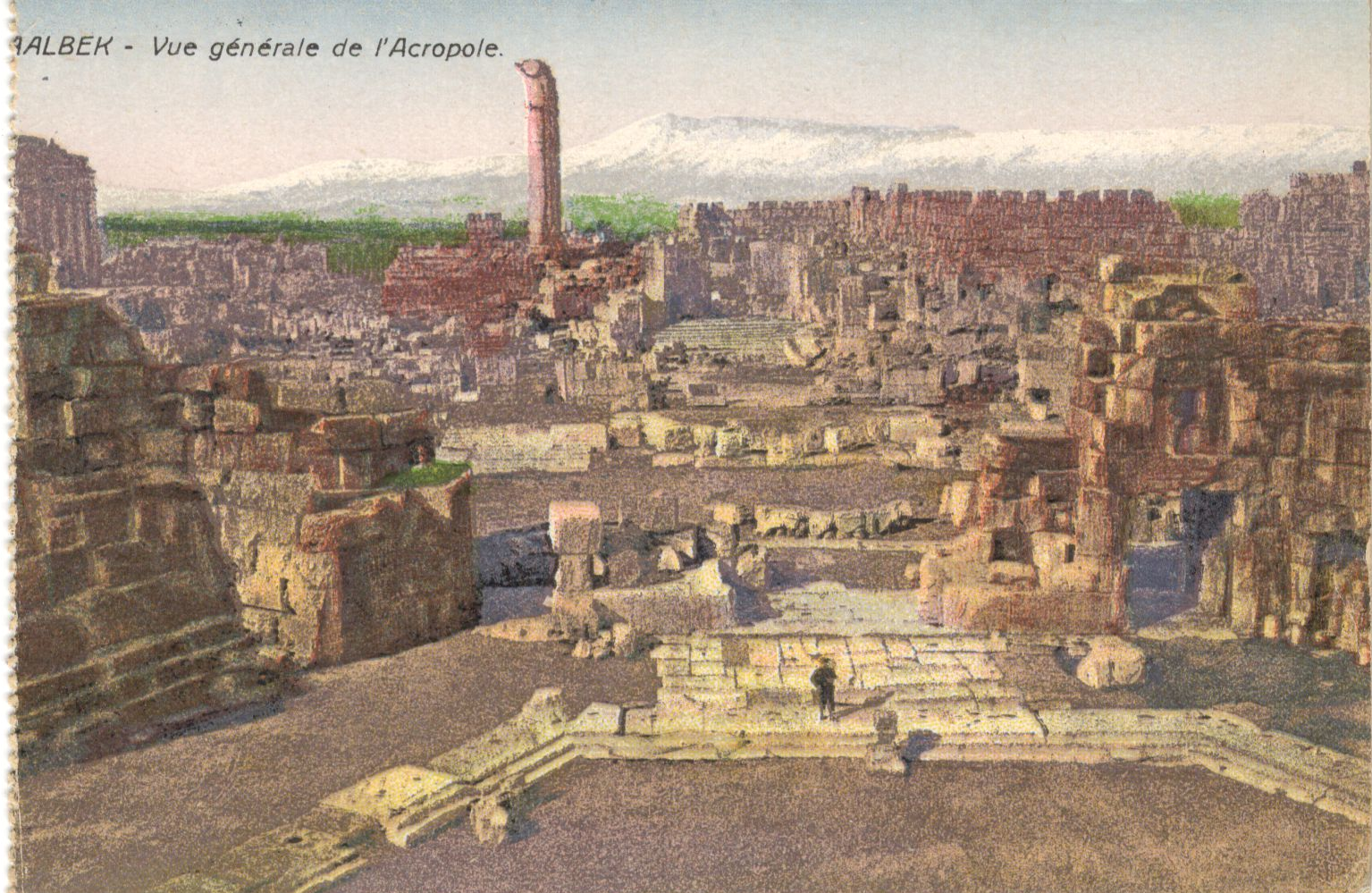

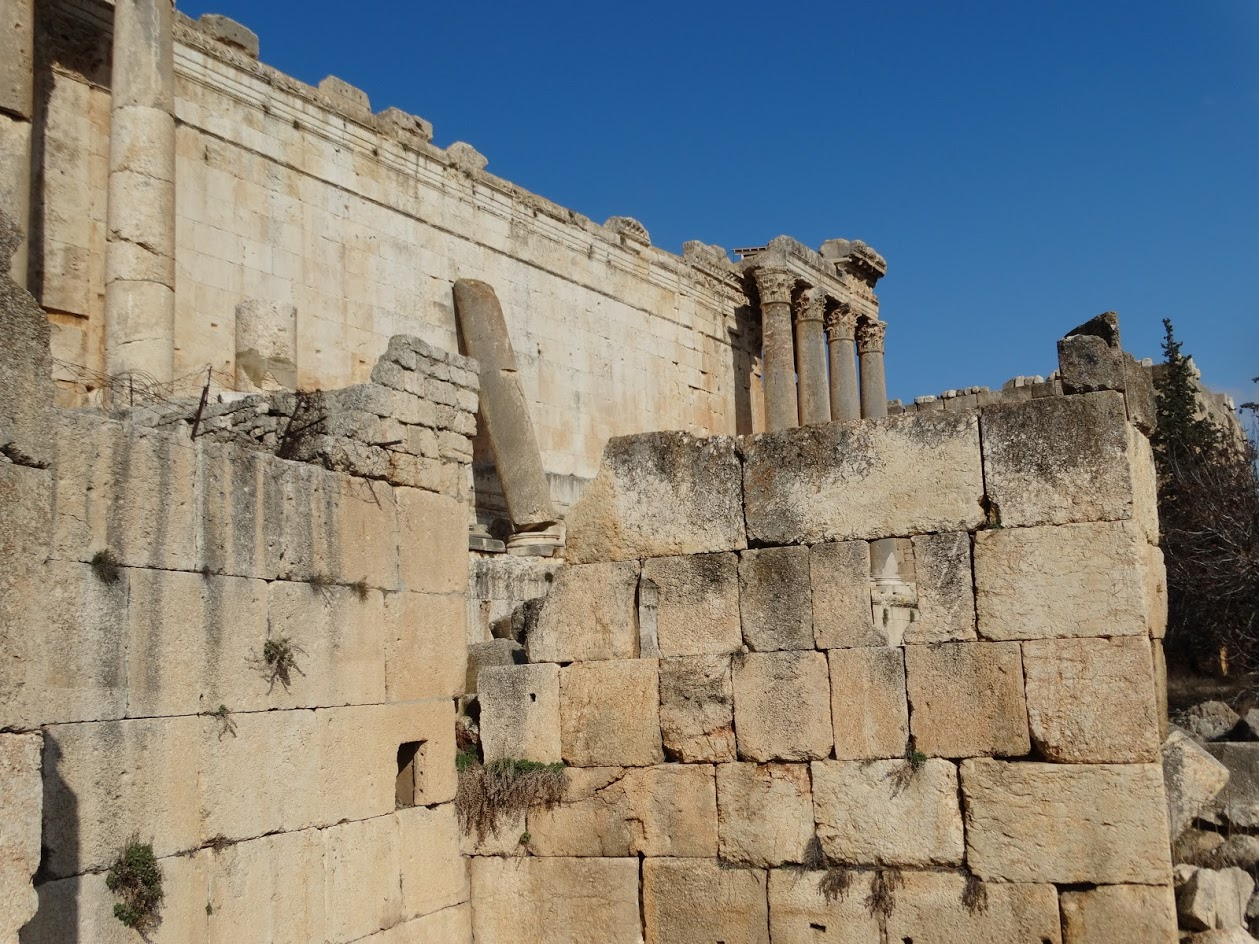

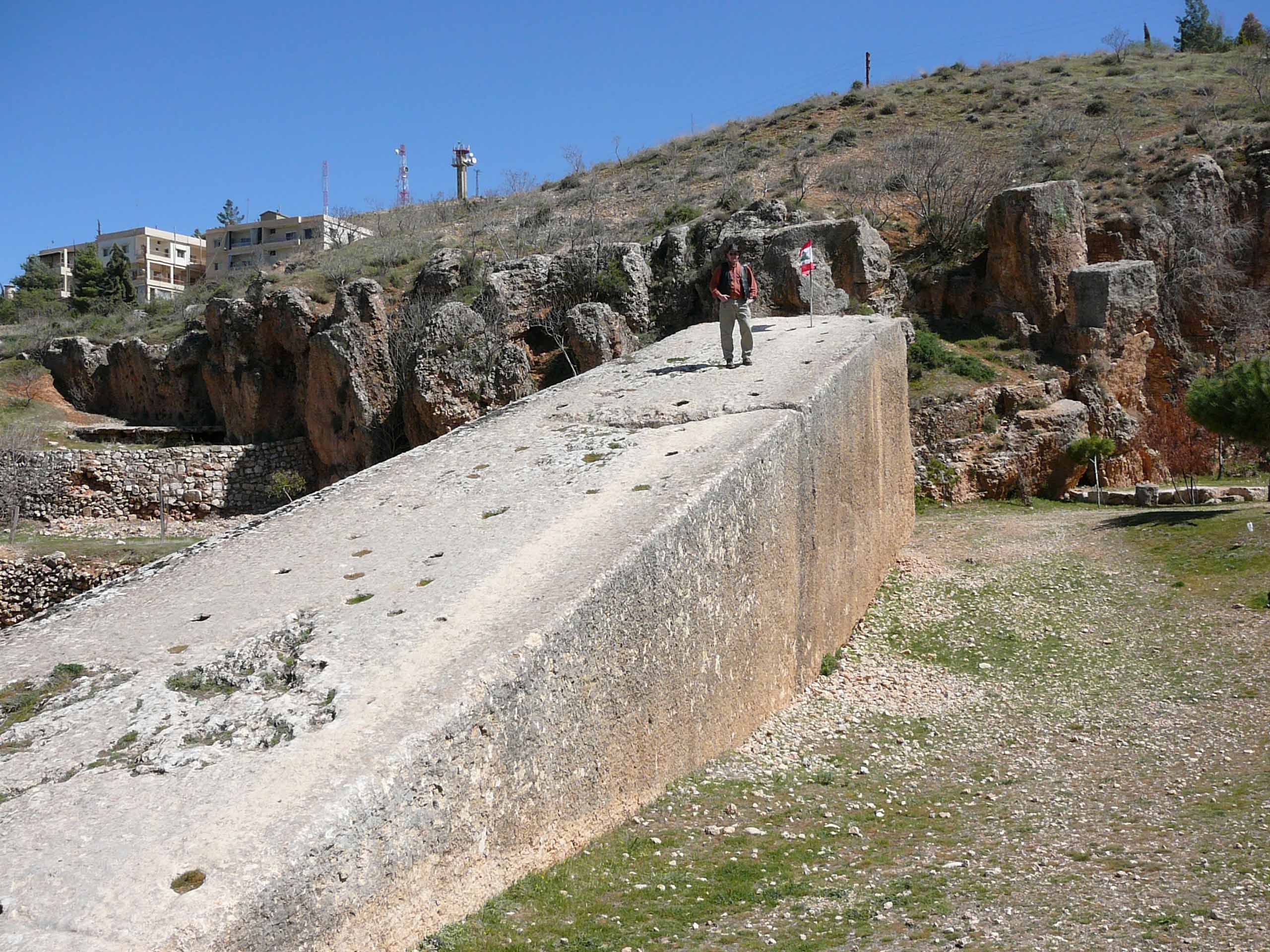
